= Obora =

Obora may refer to places:

== Czech Republic ==
- Obora (Blansko District), a municipality and village in the South Moravian Region
- Obora (Louny District), a municipality and village in the Ústí nad Labem Region
- Obora (Plzeň-North District), a municipality and village in the Plzeň Region
- Obora (Tachov District), a municipality and village in the Plzeň Region
- Obora, a village and part of Chomutice in the Hradec Králové Region
- Obora, a village and part of Doksy in the Liberec Region
- Obora, a village and part of Hracholusky (Prachatice District) in the South Bohemian Region
- Obora, a village and part of Lochovice in the Central Bohemian Region
- Obora, a village and part of Malšice in the South Bohemian Region
- Obora, a village and part of Nové Hrady (České Budějovice District) in the South Bohemian Region
- Obora, a village and part of Obrubce in the Central Bohemian Region
- Obora, a village and part of Šindelová in the Karlovy Vary Region
- Obora u Cerhonic, a village and part of Cerhonice in the South Bohemian Region
- Obora u Radobytec, a village and part of Mirotice in the South Bohemian Region

== Poland ==
- Obora, Lower Silesian Voivodeship, south-west Poland
- Obora, Greater Poland Voivodeship, west-central Poland

== Ethiopia ==
- Obora, a town in Amuru (woreda)

== See also ==
- Obory (disambiguation)
