= Kamion =

Kamion may refer to:

- Kamion, Łódź Voivodeship (central Poland)
- Kamion, Płock County in Masovian Voivodeship (east-central Poland)
- Kamion, Sochaczew County in Masovian Voivodeship (east-central Poland)
- Kamion, Żyrardów County in Masovian Voivodeship (east-central Poland)
- Nowy Kamion
