= Rokotov =

Rokotov (feminine: Rokotova) is a Russian surname.

- Fyodor Rokotov (1736–1808), Russian portraitist
- Yan Rokotov, defendant in Rokotov–Faibishenko case
- Margarita Rokotova, pen name Al Altaev (1872–1959), Soviet children's book author

== See also ==
- Rokotów, village in Poland
