= Wesoła, Sochaczew County =

Wesoła
- Village
- Location within Poland
- Coordinates: 52°12′19″N 20°5′46″E
- Country: Poland
- Voivodeship: Masovian
- County: Sochaczew
- Gmina: Rybno
- Time zone: UTC+1 (CET)
  - Summer (DST): UTC+2 (CEST)

Wesoła [vɛˈsɔwa] is a village in the administrative district of Gmina Rybno, within Sochaczew County, Masovian Voivodeship, in central Poland.

Nine Polish citizens were murdered by Nazi Germany in the village during World War II.
