= Kaptury, Sochaczew County =

Kaptury
- Village
- Location within Poland
- Coordinates: 52°18′N 19°59′E
- Country: Poland
- Voivodeship: Masovian
- County: Sochaczew
- Gmina: Iłów

Kaptury [kapˈturɨ] is a village in the administrative district of Gmina Iłów, within Sochaczew County, Masovian Voivodeship, in east-central Poland.
