= Okopy, Masovian Voivodeship =

Okopy
- Village
- Location within Poland
- Coordinates: 52°7′47″N 20°13′22″E
- Country: Poland
- Voivodeship: Masovian
- County: Sochaczew
- Gmina: Nowa Sucha
- Population: 140

Okopy [ɔˈkɔpɨ] is a village in the administrative district of Gmina Nowa Sucha, within Sochaczew County, Masovian Voivodeship, in east-central Poland.
