= Janów, Gmina Młodzieszyn =

Janów
- Village
- Location within Poland
- Coordinates: 52°19′29″N 20°16′56″E
- Country: Poland
- Voivodeship: Masovian
- County: Sochaczew
- Gmina: Młodzieszyn
- Population: 525

Janów [ˈjanuf] is a village in the administrative district of Gmina Młodzieszyn, within Sochaczew County, Masovian Voivodeship, in east-central Poland.
