= Miękinki =

Village in Gmina Iłów, Poland

- Village
- Location within Poland
- Coordinates: 52°20′14″N 20°03′06″E
- Country: Poland
- Voivodeship: Masovian
- County: Sochaczew
- Gmina: Iłów

Miękinki [mjɛŋˈkiŋki] is a village in the administrative district of Gmina Iłów, within Sochaczew County, Masovian Voivodeship, in east-central Poland.
