= Stary Szwarocin =

- Village
- Location within Poland
- Coordinates: 52°13′14″N 20°6′22″E
- Country: Poland
- Voivodeship: Masovian
- County: Sochaczew
- Gmina: Rybno

Stary Szwarocin [ˈstarɨ ʂfaˈrɔt͡ɕin] is a village in the administrative district of Gmina Rybno, within Sochaczew County, Masovian Voivodeship, in east-central Poland.
