= Stary Białynin =

- Village
- Location within Poland
- Coordinates: 52°11′01″N 20°15′09″E
- Country: Poland
- Voivodeship: Masovian
- County: Sochaczew
- Gmina: Nowa Sucha

Stary Białynin [ˈstarɨ bjaˈwɨnin] is a village in the administrative district of Gmina Nowa Sucha, within Sochaczew County, Masovian Voivodeship, in east-central Poland.
