= Aleksandrów, Gmina Iłów =

Aleksandrów
- Village
- Location within Poland
- Coordinates: 52°18′19″N 19°57′4″E
- Country: Poland
- Voivodeship: Masovian
- County: Sochaczew
- Gmina: Iłów

Aleksandrów [alɛkˈsandruf] is a village in the administrative district of Gmina Iłów, within Sochaczew County, Masovian Voivodeship, in east-central Poland.
