= Władysław Ślewiński =

Polish painter (1856–1918)

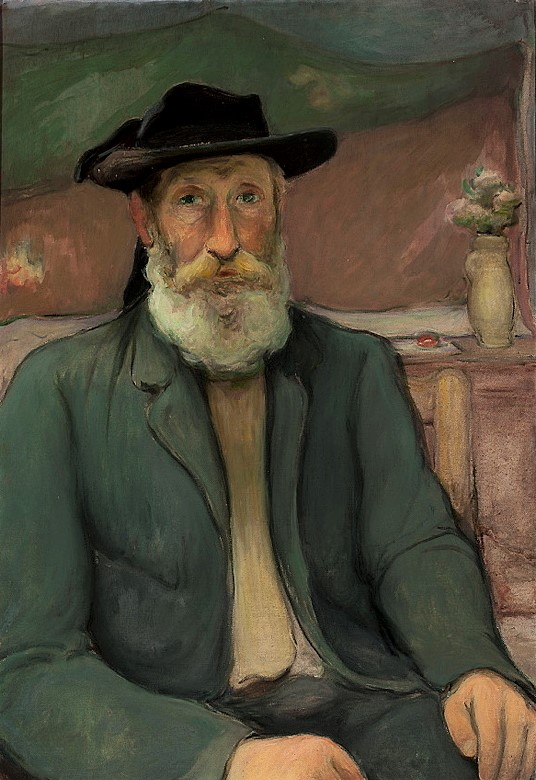
Self-portrait in Breton Costume, 1912, National Museum, Warsaw

Władysław Ślewiński (1 June 1856 – 24 March 1918) was a Polish painter. He was one of Gauguin's students and a leading artist of the Young Poland movement.

== Biography ==
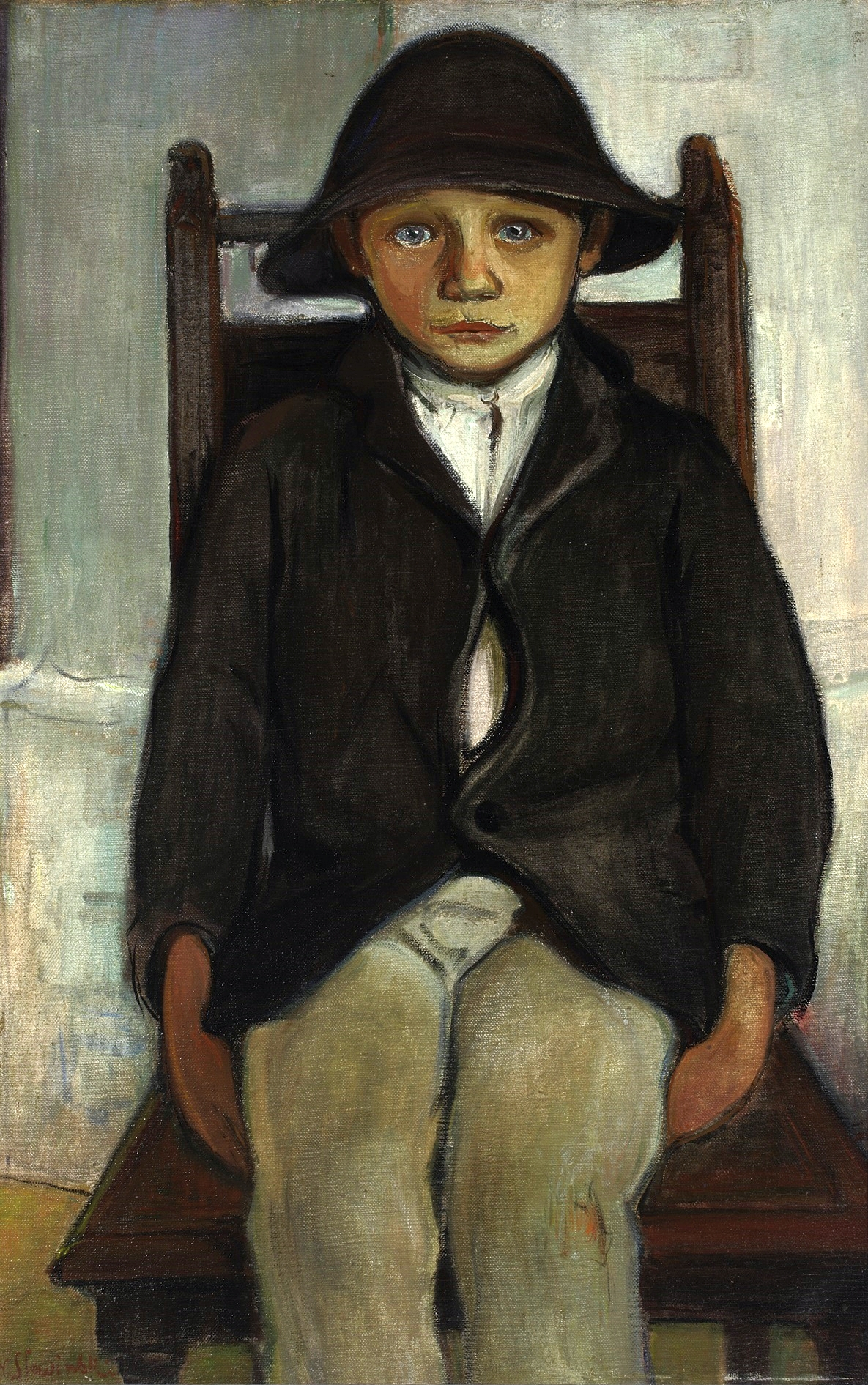
Orphan from Poronin, National Museum, Warsaw

He was born in Nowy Białynin to a landowning family and his mother died in childbirth. His cousin, the painter Józef Chełmoński, noticed his artistic talent and advised his father to enroll him at the drawing school operated by Wojciech Gerson. His father resisted at first, but finally agreed.

In 1886, he inherited his family's properties in Pilaszkowice Pierwsze, which soon led to his financial ruin. Two years later, hounded by Russian tax collectors, he fled to Paris, where he first decided to take up painting as a career. From 1888 to 1890, he studied at the Académie Colarossi and the Académie Julian.

In 1889 he made friends with Paul Gauguin and became associated with the School of Pont-Aven; spending most of his time at Le Pouldu in Brittany. He was an exhibitor at the Salon des Indépendants in 1895 and 1896.

From 1905 to 1910, he was back in Poland, serving briefly as a Professor at the Warsaw School of Fine Arts and opening his own art school. In 1910, he returned to France. He died in the Hôpital Cochin and was buried in Bagneux.

== Philosophy ==
Woman Brushing her Hair, 1897

Ślewiński's philosophy of art seems to stem from an excerpted statement of his about Gauguin: "He is so much an artist that he has to be wholly accepted or else rejected. I can feel him and accept him totally, for he suits my ideas of art and beauty". Beginning with his early works, he simplified forms and painted in flat areas. He encircled areas with contours, though he sometimes blended color into color. While he sometimes verged on abstraction, his lighting never departed completely from direct observation of nature. His approach to so-called subjective color was similar, as can be seen in some of the landscapes from the Tatra Mountains.

Perhaps more important for Ślewiński than the selective application of synthetism was his search – inspired by Gauguin – for simplicity and sincerity in places untouched by modern civilization as well as in objects of daily use. In his art, Ślewiński concentrated on the object, infusing its materiality with the reflective sensitivity of a painter. The form and color determined the painting's atmosphere. The artist used mainly earth colors, sometimes enlivened with stronger accents. He employed a repertoire of forms with curving contours, and painted without a drawn sketch, as was characteristic of the epoch.
