= Henryków, Sochaczew County =

Henryków
- Village
- Location within Poland
- Coordinates: 52°18′22″N 20°5′47″E
- Country: Poland
- Voivodeship: Masovian
- County: Sochaczew
- Gmina: Iłów
- Time zone: UTC+1 (CET)
  - Summer (DST): UTC+2 (CEST)
- Vehicle registration: WSC

Henryków [xɛnˈrɨkuf] is a village in the administrative district of Gmina Iłów, within Sochaczew County, Masovian Voivodeship, in east-central Poland.

== History ==
During the German invasion of Poland which started World War II, on September 17, 1939, the Germans carried out a massacre of 76 Poles, inhabitants of Henryków and refugees from western Poland, including women and children (see Nazi crimes against the Polish nation).
