= Oborski =

Oborski, feminine Oborska is a Polish noble family name. Historically it originated from the nobiliary toponymic naming "z Obór" ("from Obory"). The suffix "-ski" in Polish surnames has the same function.

Notable people with the surname include:

- Marcin Oborski (died 1697) a statesmnan of the Polish Lithuanian Commonwealth
- Mikołaj Stanisław Oborski (1576–1646), Polish jesuit and writer
- Ryszard Oborski (born 1952), Polish sprint canoer
- Tomasz Oborski (1571–1645) was the auxiliary bishop of Kraków from 1614 to 1645
