= Kamion Podgórny =

Village in Gmina Młodzieszyn, Poland

- Village
- Location within Poland
- Coordinates: 52°21′27″N 20°10′57″E
- Country: Poland
- Voivodeship: Masovian
- County: Sochaczew
- Gmina: Młodzieszyn

Kamion Podgórny [ˈkamjɔn pɔdˈɡurnɨ] is a village in the administrative district of Gmina Młodzieszyn, within Sochaczew County, Masovian Voivodeship, in east-central Poland.
