= Narty, Sochaczew County =

Narty
- Village
- Location within Poland
- Coordinates: 52°21′00″N 20°00′31″E
- Country: Poland
- Voivodeship: Masovian
- County: Sochaczew
- Gmina: Iłów

Narty [ˈnartɨ] is a village in the administrative district of Gmina Iłów, within Sochaczew County, Masovian Voivodeship, in east-central Poland.
