= Adamowa Góra =

- Village
- Location within Poland
- Coordinates: 52°15′46″N 20°12′40″E
- Country: Poland
- Voivodeship: Masovian
- County: Sochaczew
- Gmina: Młodzieszyn
- Population: 150

Adamowa Góra [adaˈmɔva ˈɡura] is a village in the administrative district of Gmina Młodzieszyn, within Sochaczew County, Masovian Voivodeship, in east-central Poland.
