= Konstantynów, Sochaczew County =

Konstantynów
- Village
- Location within Poland
- Coordinates: 52°12′19″N 20°07′03″E
- Country: Poland
- Voivodeship: Masovian
- County: Sochaczew
- Gmina: Rybno

Konstantynów [kɔnstanˈtɨnuf] is a village in the administrative district of Gmina Rybno, within Sochaczew County, Masovian Voivodeship, in east-central Poland.
