= Kozłów Szlachecki =

- Village
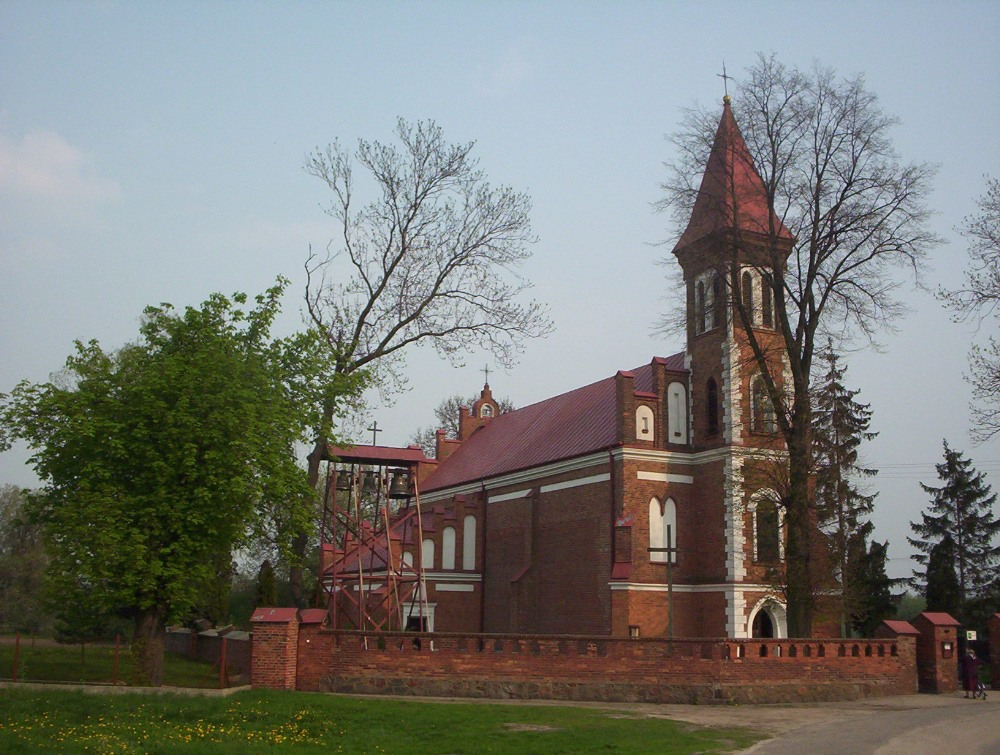
- Saint Nicholas' church in Kozłów Szlachecki village, Poland

- Location within Poland
- Coordinates: 52°10′00″N 20°08′24″E
- Country: Poland
- Voivodeship: Masovian
- County: Sochaczew
- Gmina: Nowa Sucha

Kozłów Szlachecki (Polish pronunciation: [ˈkɔzwuf ʂlaˈxɛtskʲi]) is a village in the administrative district of Gmina Nowa Sucha, within Sochaczew County, Masovian Voivodeship, in east-central Poland.
