= Białocin =

Białocin refers to the following places in Poland:

- Białocin, Łódź Voivodeship
- Białocin, Masovian Voivodeship
