= Przejma, Masovian Voivodeship =

Przejma
- Village
- Location within Poland
- Coordinates: 52°20′27″N 19°59′37″E
- Country: Poland
- Voivodeship: Masovian
- County: Sochaczew
- Gmina: Iłów

Przejma [ˈpʂɛi̯ma] is a village in the administrative district of Gmina Iłów, within Sochaczew County, Masovian Voivodeship, in east-central Poland.
