= Roztropna =

- Village
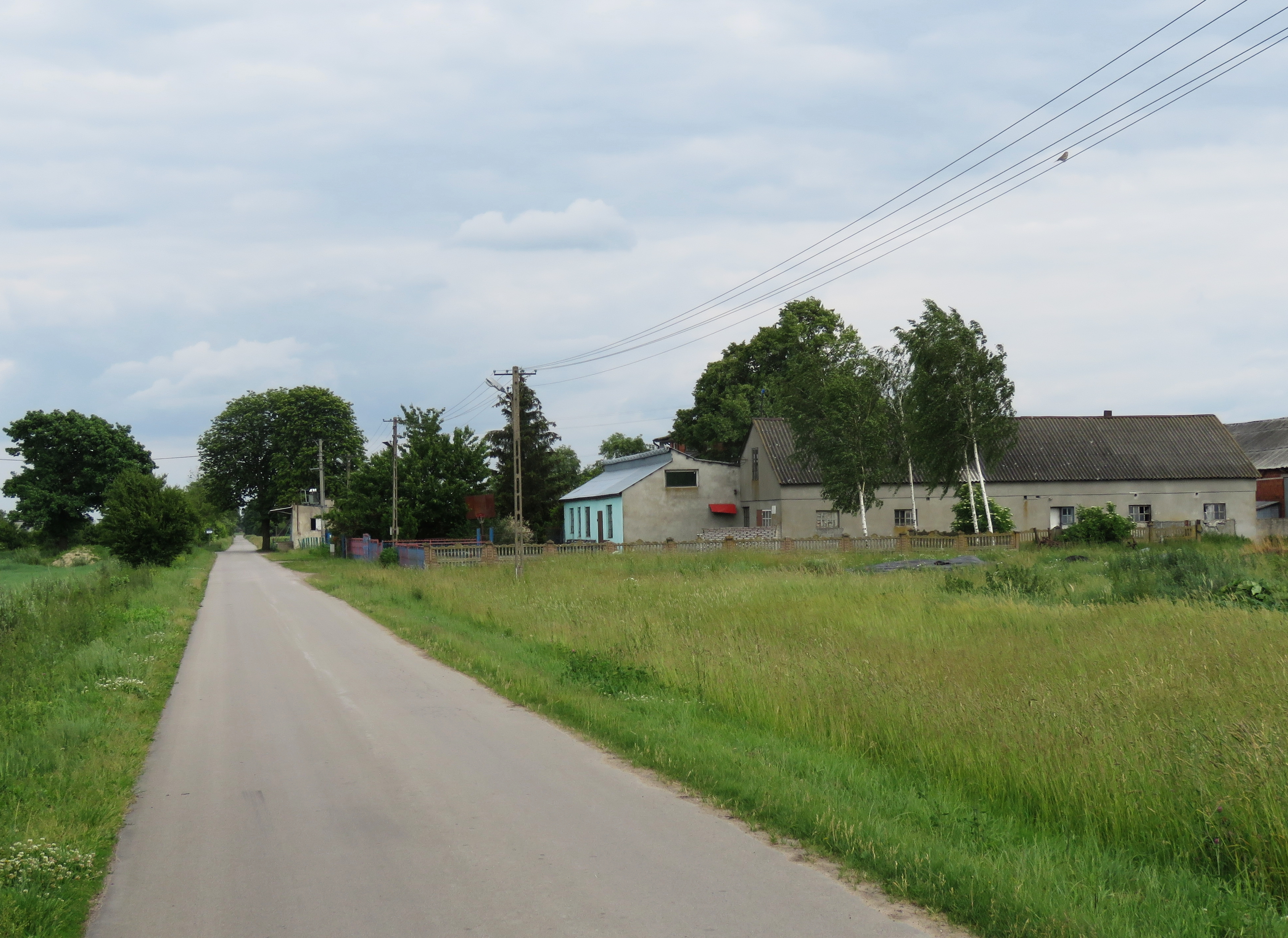
- Street of Roztopna Village, Poland

- Location within Poland
- Coordinates: 52°08′50″N 20°18′19″E
- Country: Poland
- Voivodeship: Masovian
- County: Sochaczew
- Gmina: Nowa Sucha

Roztropna [rɔsˈtrɔpna] is a village in the administrative district of Gmina Nowa Sucha, within Sochaczew County, Masovian Voivodeship, in east-central Poland.
