= Stary Dębsk =

- Village
- Location within Poland
- Coordinates: 52°11′08″N 20°08′47″E
- Country: Poland
- Voivodeship: Masovian
- County: Sochaczew
- Gmina: Nowa Sucha
- Population (approx.): 100

Stary Dębsk [ˈstarɨ ˈdɛmpsk] is a village in the administrative district of Gmina Nowa Sucha, within Sochaczew County, Masovian Voivodeship, in east-central Poland.
