= Brzozówek =

- Village
- Location within Poland
- Coordinates: 52°16′51″N 20°1′28″E
- Country: Poland
- Voivodeship: Masovian
- County: Sochaczew
- Gmina: Iłów

Brzozówek [bʐɔˈzuvɛk] is a village in the administrative district of Gmina Iłów, within Sochaczew County, Masovian Voivodeship, in east-central Poland.
