= Nowa Wieś, Gmina Rybno =

Nowa Wieś
- Village
- Location within Poland
- Coordinates: 52°15′48″N 20°6′42″E
- Country: Poland
- Voivodeship: Masovian
- County: Sochaczew
- Gmina: Rybno
- Population: 90

Nowa Wieś [ˈnɔva ˈvjɛɕ] is a village in the administrative district of Gmina Rybno, within Sochaczew County, Masovian Voivodeship, in east-central Poland.
