= Gilówka Górna =

- Village
- Location within Poland
- Coordinates: 52°21′13″N 20°1′19″E
- Country: Poland
- Voivodeship: Masovian
- County: Sochaczew
- Gmina: Iłów
- Population: 120

Gilówka Górna [ɡiˈlufka ˈɡurna] is a village in the administrative district of Gmina Iłów, within Sochaczew County, Masovian Voivodeship, in east-central Poland.
