= Antosin, Masovian Voivodeship =

Antosin
- Village
- Location within Poland
- Coordinates: 52°16′26″N 20°4′59″E
- Country: Poland
- Voivodeship: Masovian
- County: Sochaczew
- Gmina: Rybno

Antosin [anˈtɔɕin] is a village in the administrative district of Gmina Rybno, within Sochaczew County, Masovian Voivodeship, in east-central Poland.
