= Suchodół, Sochaczew County =

Suchodół
- Village
- Location within Poland
- Coordinates: 52°23′N 20°0′E
- Country: Poland
- Voivodeship: Masovian
- County: Sochaczew
- Gmina: Iłów

Suchodół (Polish pronunciation: [suˈxɔduw]) is a village in the administrative district of Gmina Iłów, within Sochaczew County, Masovian Voivodeship, in east-central Poland.
