= Nowy Szwarocin =

- Village
- Location within Poland
- Coordinates: 52°13′3″N 20°7′31″E
- Country: Poland
- Voivodeship: Masovian
- County: Sochaczew
- Gmina: Rybno

Nowy Szwarocin [ˈnɔvɨ ʂfaˈrɔt͡ɕin] is a village in the administrative district of Gmina Rybno, within Sochaczew County, Masovian Voivodeship, in east-central Poland.
