= Leśniaki, Masovian Voivodeship =

Leśniaki
- Village
- Location within Poland
- Coordinates: 52°20′34″N 20°04′22″E
- Country: Poland
- Voivodeship: Masovian
- County: Sochaczew
- Gmina: Iłów

Leśniaki [lɛɕˈɲaki] is a village in the administrative district of Gmina Iłów, within Sochaczew County, Masovian Voivodeship, in east-central Poland.
