= Kępa Karolińska =

Village in Gmina Iłów, Poland

- Village
- Location within Poland
- Coordinates: 52°24′31″N 19°58′25″E
- Country: Poland
- Voivodeship: Masovian
- County: Sochaczew
- Gmina: Iłów

Kępa Karolińska [ˈkɛmpa karɔˈliɲska] is a village in the administrative district of Gmina Iłów, within Sochaczew County, Masovian Voivodeship, in east-central Poland.
