= Zalesie, Sochaczew County =

Zalesie
- Village
- Location within Poland
- Coordinates: 52°17′21″N 19°59′39″E
- Country: Poland
- Voivodeship: Masovian
- County: Sochaczew
- Gmina: Iłów

Zalesie [zaˈlɛɕɛ] is a village in the administrative district of Gmina Iłów, within Sochaczew County, Masovian Voivodeship, in east-central Poland.
