= Nowe Mistrzewice =

- Village
- Location within Poland
- Coordinates: 52°18′28″N 20°14′0″E
- Country: Poland
- Voivodeship: Masovian
- County: Sochaczew
- Gmina: Młodzieszyn

Nowe Mistrzewice [ˈnɔvɛ mistʂɛˈvit͡sɛ] is a village in the administrative district of Gmina Młodzieszyn, within Sochaczew County, Masovian Voivodeship, in east-central Poland.
