= Lasotka =

- Village
- Location within Poland
- Coordinates: 52°19′N 20°0′E
- Country: Poland
- Voivodeship: Masovian
- County: Sochaczew
- Gmina: Iłów
- Population: 110

Lasotka [laˈsɔtka] is a village in the administrative district of Gmina Iłów, within Sochaczew County, Masovian Voivodeship, in east-central Poland.
