= Arciechów, Sochaczew County =

Arciechów
- Village
- Location within Poland
- Coordinates: 52°22′13″N 20°6′1″E
- Country: Poland
- Voivodeship: Masovian
- County: Sochaczew
- Gmina: Iłów

Arciechów [arˈt͡ɕɛxuf] is a village in the administrative district of Gmina Iłów, within Sochaczew County, Masovian Voivodeship, in east-central Poland.
