= Marysin, Sochaczew County =

Marysin
- Village
- Location within Poland
- Coordinates: 52°18′57″N 20°13′22″E
- Country: Poland
- Voivodeship: Masovian
- County: Sochaczew
- Gmina: Młodzieszyn

Marysin [maˈrɨɕin] is a village in the administrative district of Gmina Młodzieszyn, within Sochaczew County, Masovian Voivodeship, in east-central Poland.
