= Łady, Sochaczew County =

Łady
- Village
- Location within Poland
- Coordinates: 52°22′N 20°5′E
- Country: Poland
- Voivodeship: Masovian
- County: Sochaczew
- Gmina: Iłów

Łady [ˈwadɨ] (German Lade) is a village in the administrative district of Gmina Iłów, within Sochaczew County, Masovian Voivodeship, in east-central Poland.
