= Rzepki, Masovian Voivodeship =

Rzepki
- Village
- Location within Poland
- Coordinates: 52°20′26″N 20°05′12″E
- Country: Poland
- Voivodeship: Masovian
- County: Sochaczew
- Gmina: Iłów

Rzepki [ˈʐɛpki] is a village in the administrative district of Gmina Iłów, within Sochaczew County, Masovian Voivodeship, in east-central Poland.
