= Olszynki, Masovian Voivodeship =

Olszynki
- Village
- Location within Poland
- Coordinates: 52°20′39″N 20°10′12″E
- Country: Poland
- Voivodeship: Masovian
- County: Sochaczew
- Gmina: Młodzieszyn

Olszynki [ɔlˈʂɨŋki] is a village in the administrative district of Gmina Młodzieszyn, within Sochaczew County, Masovian Voivodeship, in east-central Poland.
