= Kurdwanów, Masovian Voivodeship =

Kurdwanów
- Village
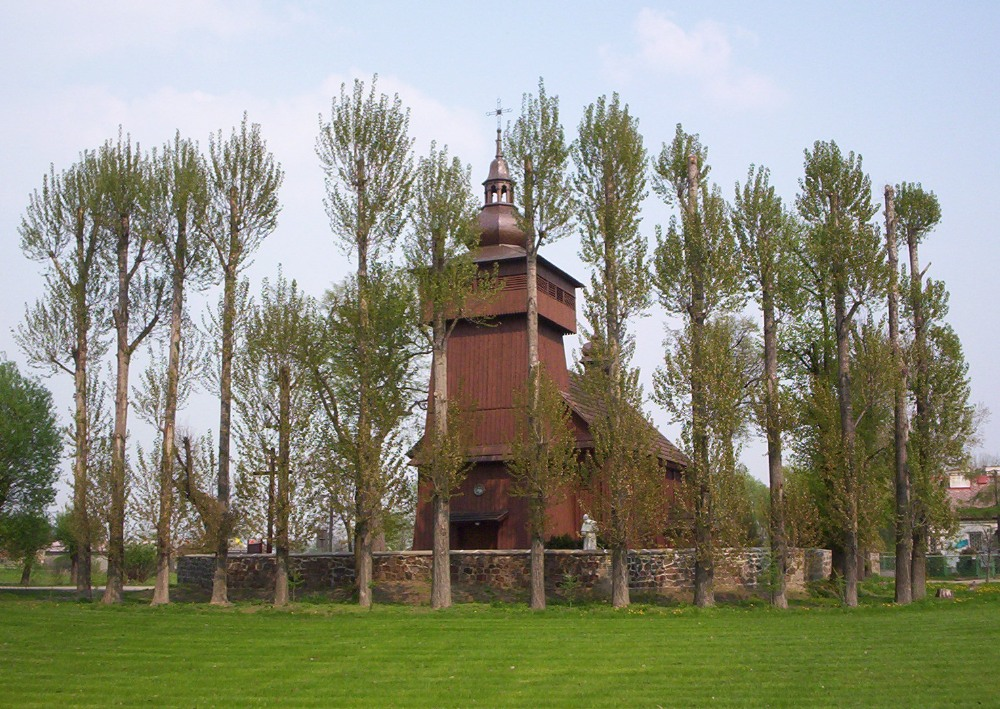
- Church of the Transfiguration in Kurdwanów

- Location within Poland
- Coordinates: 52°07′39″N 20°15′09″E
- Country: Poland
- Voivodeship: Lesser Poland
- County: Sochaczew
- Gmina: Nowa Sucha
- Time zone: UTC+1 (CET)
  - Summer (DST): UTC+2 (CEST)

Kurdwanów [kurdˈvanuf] is a village in the administrative district of Gmina Nowa Sucha, within Sochaczew County, Masovian Voivodeship, in central Poland.

Five Polish citizens were murdered by Nazi Germany in the village during World War II.
