= Jozin =

Jozin may refer to:

- Jozin, a romanization variant for Jazin, Mazandaran, village in Iran
- Józin, Sochaczew County, village in Poland
- Józin, Sokołów County, village in Poland
- Jožin z bažin, a monster from the eponymous humorous Czech song
