= Giżyce, Masovian Voivodeship =

Giżyce
- Village
- Location within Poland
- Coordinates: 52°17′28″N 20°4′56″E
- Country: Poland
- Voivodeship: Masovian
- County: Sochaczew
- Gmina: Iłów

Giżyce [ɡiˈʐɨt͡sɛ] is a village in the administrative district of Gmina Iłów, within Sochaczew County, Masovian Voivodeship, in east-central Poland.
