= Wieniec, Masovian Voivodeship =

Wieniec
- Village
- Location within Poland
- Coordinates: 52°15′57″N 20°00′41″E
- Country: Poland
- Voivodeship: Masovian
- County: Sochaczew
- Gmina: Iłów

Wieniec [ˈvjɛɲɛt͡s] is a village in the administrative district of Gmina Iłów, within Sochaczew County, Masovian Voivodeship, in east-central Poland.
