= Ludwików, Gmina Rybno =

Ludwików
- Village
- Location within Poland
- Coordinates: 52°14′38″N 20°04′18″E
- Country: Poland
- Voivodeship: Masovian
- County: Sochaczew
- Gmina: Rybno

Ludwików [ludˈvikuf] is a village in the administrative district of Gmina Rybno, within Sochaczew County, Masovian Voivodeship, in east-central Poland.
