= Nowa Wieś, Gmina Młodzieszyn =

Nowa Wieś
- Village
- Location within Poland
- Coordinates: 52°20′47″N 20°7′45″E
- Country: Poland
- Voivodeship: Masovian
- County: Sochaczew
- Gmina: Młodzieszyn
- Population: 22

Nowa Wieś [ˈnɔva ˈvjɛɕ] is a village in the administrative district of Gmina Młodzieszyn, within Sochaczew County, Masovian Voivodeship, in east-central Poland.
