= Koszajec, Sochaczew County =

Koszajec
- Village
- Location within Poland
- Coordinates: 52°15′58″N 20°01′33″E
- Country: Poland
- Voivodeship: Masovian
- County: Sochaczew
- Gmina: Rybno

Koszajec [kɔˈʂajɛt͡s] is a village in the administrative district of Gmina Rybno, within Sochaczew County, Masovian Voivodeship, in east-central Poland.
