= Kozłów Biskupi =

- Village
- Location within Poland
- Coordinates: 52°12′N 20°12′E
- Country: Poland
- Voivodeship: Masovian
- County: Sochaczew
- Gmina: Nowa Sucha

Kozłów Biskupi [ˈkɔzwuf bisˈkupi] is a village in the administrative district of Gmina Nowa Sucha, within Sochaczew County, Masovian Voivodeship, in east-central Poland.
