= Karłowo, Masovian Voivodeship =

Karłowo
- Village
- Location within Poland
- Coordinates: 52°18′7″N 19°59′12″E
- Country: Poland
- Voivodeship: Masovian
- County: Sochaczew
- Gmina: Iłów
- Population: 140

Karłowo [karˈwɔvɔ] is a village in the administrative district of Gmina Iłów, within Sochaczew County, Masovian Voivodeship, in east-central Poland.
