= Matyldów, Sochaczew County =

Matyldów
- Village
- Location within Poland
- Coordinates: 52°16′N 20°4′E
- Country: Poland
- Voivodeship: Masovian
- County: Sochaczew
- Gmina: Rybno

Matyldów [maˈtɨlduf] is a village in the administrative district of Gmina Rybno, within Sochaczew County, Masovian Voivodeship, in east-central Poland.
