= Mizerka =

- Village
- Location within Poland
- Coordinates: 52°08′21″N 20°11′04″E
- Country: Poland
- Voivodeship: Masovian
- County: Sochaczew
- Gmina: Nowa Sucha

Mizerka [miˈzɛrka] is a village in the administrative district of Gmina Nowa Sucha, within Sochaczew County, Masovian Voivodeship, in east-central Poland.
