= Kornelin, Masovian Voivodeship =

Kornelin
- Village
- Location within Poland
- Coordinates: 52°10′48″N 20°12′27″E
- Country: Poland
- Voivodeship: Masovian
- County: Sochaczew
- Gmina: Nowa Sucha

Kornelin [kɔrˈnɛlin] is a village in the administrative district of Gmina Nowa Sucha, within Sochaczew County, Masovian Voivodeship, in east-central Poland.
