= Skutki =

- Village
- Location within Poland
- Coordinates: 52°17′36″N 20°7′45″E
- Country: Poland
- Voivodeship: Masovian
- County: Sochaczew
- Gmina: Młodzieszyn

Skutki [ˈskutki] is a village in the administrative district of Gmina Młodzieszyn, within Sochaczew County, Masovian Voivodeship, in east-central Poland.
