= Budy Iłowskie =

- Village
- Location within Poland
- Coordinates: 52°20′N 20°7′E
- Country: Poland
- Voivodeship: Masovian
- County: Sochaczew
- Gmina: Iłów

Budy Iłowskie [ˈbudɨ iˈwɔfskʲɛ] is a village in the administrative district of Gmina Iłów, within Sochaczew County, Masovian Voivodeship, in east-central Poland.
