= Karolków Szwarocki =

Village in Gmina Rybno, Poland

- Village
- Location within Poland
- Coordinates: 52°12′02″N 20°09′58″E
- Country: Poland
- Voivodeship: Masovian
- County: Sochaczew
- Gmina: Rybno

Karolków Szwarocki [kaˈrɔlkuf ʂfaˈrɔt͡ski] is a village in the administrative district of Gmina Rybno, within Sochaczew County, Masovian Voivodeship, in east-central Poland.
