= Stare Budy, Sochaczew County =

Stare Budy
- Village
- Location within Poland
- Coordinates: 52°18′55″N 20°8′34″E
- Country: Poland
- Voivodeship: Masovian
- County: Sochaczew
- Gmina: Młodzieszyn

Stare Budy [ˈstarɛ ˈbudɨ] is a village in the administrative district of Gmina Młodzieszyn, within Sochaczew County, Masovian Voivodeship, in east-central Poland.
