= Rokicina =

- Village
- Location within Poland
- Coordinates: 52°19′51″N 20°8′36″E
- Country: Poland
- Voivodeship: Masovian
- County: Sochaczew
- Gmina: Młodzieszyn

Rokicina [rɔkiˈt͡ɕina] is a village in the administrative district of Gmina Młodzieszyn, within Sochaczew County, Masovian Voivodeship, in east-central Poland.
