= Ruszki, Masovian Voivodeship =

Ruszki
- Village
- Location within Poland
- Coordinates: 52°16′2″N 20°9′59″E
- Country: Poland
- Voivodeship: Masovian
- County: Sochaczew
- Gmina: Młodzieszyn
- Population: 333

Ruszki [ˈruʂki] is a village in the administrative district of Gmina Młodzieszyn, within Sochaczew County, Masovian Voivodeship, in east-central Poland.
