= Stara Sucha, Sochaczew County =

Stara Sucha
- Village
- Location within Poland
- Coordinates: 52°09′26″N 20°11′16″E
- Country: Poland
- Voivodeship: Masovian
- County: Sochaczew
- Gmina: Nowa Sucha

Stara Sucha [ˈstara ˈsuxa] is a village in the administrative district of Gmina Nowa Sucha, within Sochaczew County, Masovian Voivodeship, in east-central Poland.
