= Rokocina =

- Village
- Location within Poland
- Coordinates: 52°20′05″N 20°07′11″E
- Country: Poland
- Voivodeship: Masovian
- County: Sochaczew
- Gmina: Iłów

Rokocina [rɔkɔˈt͡ɕina] is a village in the administrative district of Gmina Iłów, within Sochaczew County, Masovian Voivodeship, in east-central Poland.
