= Wężyki =

- Village
- Location within Poland
- Coordinates: 52°17′N 20°7′E
- Country: Poland
- Voivodeship: Masovian
- County: Sochaczew
- Gmina: Rybno

Wężyki [vɛ̃ˈʐɨki] is a village in the administrative district of Gmina Rybno, within Sochaczew County, Masovian Voivodeship, in east-central Poland.
