= Erminów =

- Village
- Location within Poland
- Coordinates: 52°13′N 20°10′E
- Country: Poland
- Voivodeship: Masovian
- County: Sochaczew
- Gmina: Rybno

Erminów [ɛrˈminuf] is a village in the administrative district of Gmina Rybno, within Sochaczew County, Masovian Voivodeship, in east-central Poland.
