= Brzozowiec, Masovian Voivodeship =

Brzozowiec
- Village
- Location within Poland
- Coordinates: 52°19′N 20°2′E
- Country: Poland
- Voivodeship: Masovian
- County: Sochaczew
- Gmina: Iłów

Brzozowiec [bʐɔˈzɔvjɛt͡s] is a village in the administrative district of Gmina Iłów, within Sochaczew County, Masovian Voivodeship, in east-central Poland.
