= Kamieńszczyzna, Masovian Voivodeship =

Kamieńszczyzna
- Village
- Location within Poland
- Coordinates: 52°14′N 20°6′E
- Country: Poland
- Voivodeship: Masovian
- County: Sochaczew
- Gmina: Rybno
- Population (approx.): 80

Kamieńszczyzna [kamjɛɲʂˈt͡ʂɨzna] is a village in the administrative district of Gmina Rybno, within Sochaczew County, Masovian Voivodeship, in east-central Poland.
