= Gmina Rybno =

Gmina Rybno may refer to either of the following rural administrative districts in Poland:

- Gmina Rybno, Warmian-Masurian Voivodeship
- Gmina Rybno, Masovian Voivodeship
