= Helenów, Sochaczew County =

Helenów
- Village
- Location within Poland
- Coordinates: 52°17′41″N 20°06′30″E
- Country: Poland
- Voivodeship: Masovian
- County: Sochaczew
- Gmina: Młodzieszyn
- Time zone: UTC+1 (CET)
  - Summer (DST): UTC+2 (CEST)

Helenów [xɛˈlɛnuf] is a village in the administrative district of Gmina Młodzieszyn, within Sochaczew County, Masovian Voivodeship, in central Poland.
