= Nowy Kozłów Pierwszy =

Village in Gmina Nowa Sucha, Poland

- Village
- Location within Poland
- Coordinates: 52°09′23″N 20°07′27″E
- Country: Poland
- Voivodeship: Masovian
- County: Sochaczew
- Gmina: Nowa Sucha

Nowy Kozłów Pierwszy [ˈnɔvɨ ˈkɔzwuf ˈpjɛrfʂɨ] is a village in the administrative district of Gmina Nowa Sucha, within Sochaczew County, Masovian Voivodeship, in east-central Poland.
