= Ćmiszew-Parcel =

- Village
- Location within Poland
- Coordinates: 52°13′21″N 20°9′1″E
- Country: Poland
- Voivodeship: Masovian
- County: Sochaczew
- Gmina: Rybno

Ćmiszew-Parcel [ˈt͡ɕmiʂɛf ˈpart͡sɛl] is a village in the administrative district of Gmina Rybno, within Sochaczew County, Masovian Voivodeship, in east-central Poland.
