= Wikcinek =

- Village
- Location within Poland
- Coordinates: 52°08′42″N 20°13′32″E
- Country: Poland
- Voivodeship: Masovian
- County: Sochaczew
- Gmina: Nowa Sucha

Wikcinek [vikˈt͡ɕinɛk] is a village in the administrative district of Gmina Nowa Sucha, within Sochaczew County, Masovian Voivodeship, in east-central Poland.
