= Szeligi =

Szeligi may refer to the following places:

- Szeligi, Płock County in Masovian Voivodeship (east-central Poland)
- Szeligi, Sochaczew County in Masovian Voivodeship (east-central Poland)
- Szeligi, Świętokrzyskie Voivodeship (south-central Poland)
- Szeligi, Warsaw West County in Masovian Voivodeship (east-central Poland)
- Szeligi, Warmian-Masurian Voivodeship (north Poland)

== See also ==
- Szeliga coat of arms
