= Władysławów, Gmina Iłów =

Władysławów
- Village
- Location within Poland
- Coordinates: 52°22′28″N 20°00′18″E
- Country: Poland
- Voivodeship: Masovian
- County: Sochaczew
- Gmina: Iłów

Władysławów [vwadɨˈswavuf] is a village in the administrative district of Gmina Iłów, within Sochaczew County, Masovian Voivodeship, in east-central Poland.
