= Witkowice, Masovian Voivodeship =

Witkowice
- Village
- Location within Poland
- Coordinates: 52°20′N 20°14′E
- Country: Poland
- Voivodeship: Masovian
- County: Sochaczew
- Gmina: Młodzieszyn
- Population (approx.): 500

Witkowice [vitkɔˈvit͡sɛ] is a village in the administrative district of Gmina Młodzieszyn, within Sochaczew County, Masovian Voivodeship, in east-central Poland.
