= Olszowiec, Gmina Iłów =

Olszowiec
- Village
- Location within Poland
- Coordinates: 52°19′42″N 20°3′40″E
- Country: Poland
- Voivodeship: Masovian
- County: Sochaczew
- Gmina: Iłów
- Population: 30

Olszowiec [ɔlˈʂɔvjɛt͡s] is a village in the administrative district of Gmina Iłów, within Sochaczew County, Masovian Voivodeship, in east-central Poland.
