= Januszew =

- Village
- Location within Poland
- Coordinates: 52°22′N 20°9′E
- Country: Poland
- Voivodeship: Masovian
- County: Sochaczew
- Gmina: Młodzieszyn

Januszew [jaˈnuʂɛf] is a village in the administrative district of Gmina Młodzieszyn, within Sochaczew County, Masovian Voivodeship, in east-central Poland. Januszew has hosted the Młodzieszyn Polish Culture Festival each April since 2002.
