= Sarnów, Sochaczew County =

Sarnów
- Village
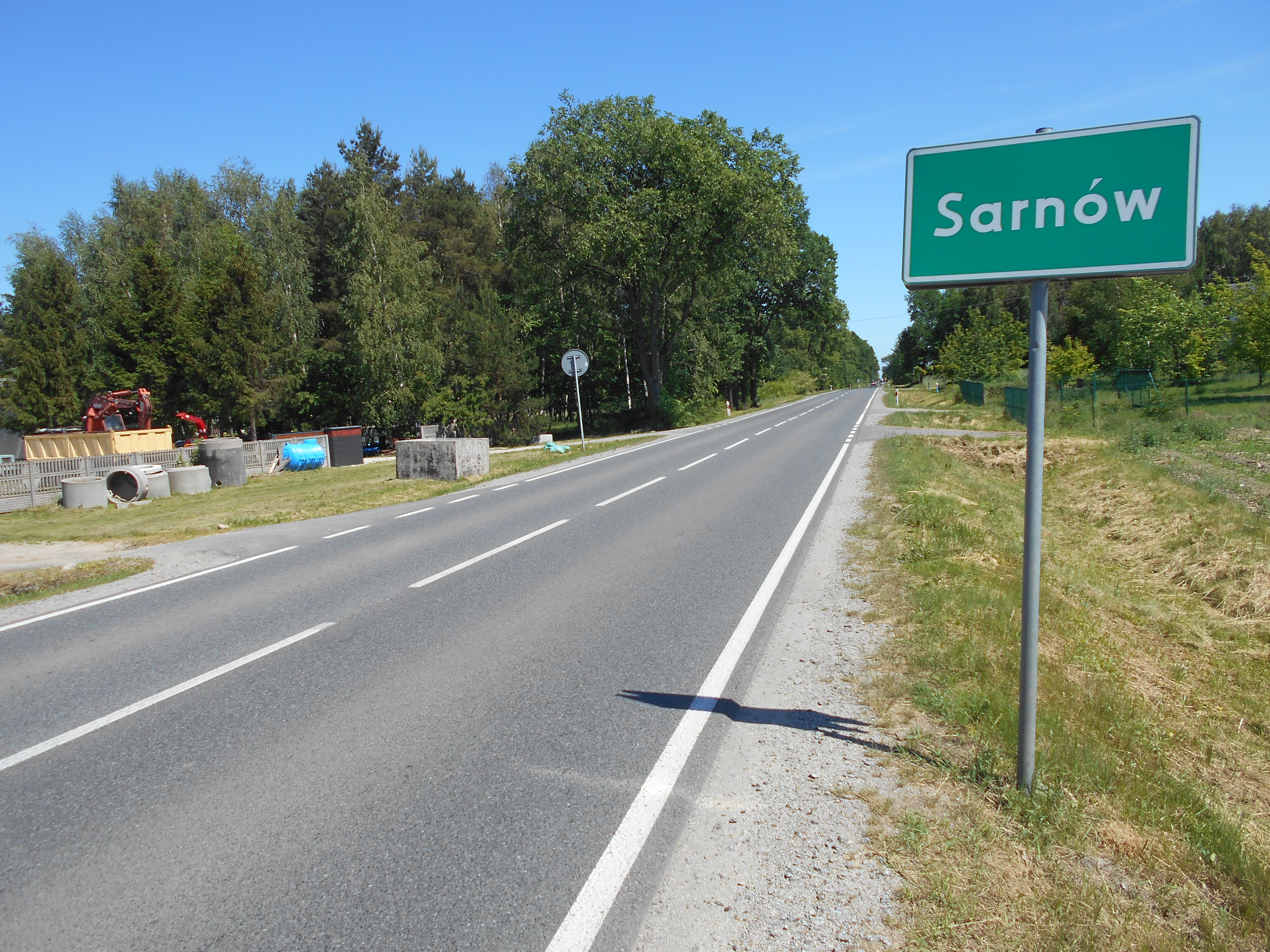

- Location within Poland
- Coordinates: 52°16′N 20°8′E
- Country: Poland
- Voivodeship: Masovian
- County: Sochaczew
- Gmina: Rybno
- Time zone: UTC+1 (CET)
  - Summer (DST): UTC+2 (CEST)

Sarnów [ˈsarnuf] is a village in the administrative district of Gmina Rybno, within Sochaczew County, Masovian Voivodeship, in east-central Poland.

Five Polish citizens were murdered by Nazi Germany in the village during World War II.
