= Arciechówek =

Village in Gmina Iłów, Poland

- Village
- Location within Poland
- Coordinates: 52°21′31″N 20°5′41″E
- Country: Poland
- Voivodeship: Masovian
- County: Sochaczew
- Gmina: Iłów

Arciechówek [art͡ɕɛˈxuvɛk] is a village in the administrative district of Gmina Iłów, within Sochaczew County, Masovian Voivodeship, in east-central Poland.
