= Aleksandrów, Gmina Rybno =

Aleksandrów
- Village
- Location within Poland
- Coordinates: 52°14′N 20°14′E
- Country: Poland
- Voivodeship: Masovian
- County: Sochaczew
- Gmina: Rybno

Aleksandrów [alɛkˈsandruf] is a village in the administrative district of Gmina Rybno, within Sochaczew County, Masovian Voivodeship, in east-central Poland.
