= Emilianów Załuskowski =

- Village
- Location within Poland
- Coordinates: 52°18′39″N 19°59′35″E
- Country: Poland
- Voivodeship: Masovian
- County: Sochaczew
- Gmina: Iłów
- Population: 130

Emilianów Załuskowski [ɛmiˈljanuf zawusˈkɔfski] is a village in the administrative district of Gmina Iłów, within Sochaczew County, Masovian Voivodeship, in east-central Poland.
