= Bronisławy, Gmina Rybno =

Village in Gmina Rybno, Poland

Bronisławy
- Village
- Location within Poland
- Coordinates: 52°15′03″N 20°10′27″E
- Country: Poland
- Voivodeship: Masovian
- County: Sochaczew
- Gmina: Rybno

Bronisławy [brɔniˈswavɨ] is a village in the administrative district of Gmina Rybno, within Sochaczew County, Masovian Voivodeship, in east-central Poland.
