= Justynów, Sochaczew County =

Justynów
- Village
- Location within Poland
- Coordinates: 52°18′N 20°10′E
- Country: Poland
- Voivodeship: Masovian
- County: Sochaczew
- Gmina: Młodzieszyn

Justynów [jusˈtɨnuf] is a village in the administrative district of Gmina Młodzieszyn, within Sochaczew County, Masovian Voivodeship, in east-central Poland.
