= Radziwiłka =

- Village
- Location within Poland
- Coordinates: 52°19′N 20°11′E
- Country: Poland
- Voivodeship: Masovian
- County: Sochaczew
- Gmina: Młodzieszyn
- Population: 55

Radziwiłka [rad͡ʑiˈviu̯ka] is a village in the administrative district of Gmina Młodzieszyn, within Sochaczew County, Masovian Voivodeship, in east-central Poland.
