= Leontynów =

Village in Gmina Młodzieszyn, Poland

- Village
- Location within Poland
- Coordinates: 52°18′42″N 20°11′05″E
- Country: Poland
- Voivodeship: Masovian
- County: Sochaczew
- Gmina: Młodzieszyn

Leontynów [lɛɔnˈtɨnuf] is a village in the administrative district of Gmina Młodzieszyn, within Sochaczew County, Masovian Voivodeship, in east-central Poland.
