= Cypriany =

- Village
- Location within Poland
- Coordinates: 52°15′N 20°8′E
- Country: Poland
- Voivodeship: Masovian
- County: Sochaczew
- Gmina: Rybno
- Website: www.rybno.org.pl

Cypriany [t͡sɨˈprjanɨ] is a village in the administrative district of Gmina Rybno, within Sochaczew County, Masovian Voivodeship, in east-central Poland.
