= Zakrzew, Sochaczew County =

Zakrzew
- Village
- Location within Poland
- Coordinates: 52°09′40″N 20°09′31″E
- Country: Poland
- Voivodeship: Masovian
- County: Sochaczew
- Gmina: Nowa Sucha

Zakrzew [ˈzakʂɛf] is a village in the administrative district of Gmina Nowa Sucha, within Sochaczew County, Masovian Voivodeship, in east-central Poland.
