= Dobki =

Dobki may refer to the following places:

- Dobki, Masovian Voivodeship (east-central Poland)
- Dobki, Podlaskie Voivodeship (north-east Poland)
- Dobki, Warmian-Masurian Voivodeship (north Poland)
