= Kolonia Gradowska =

- Village
- Location within Poland
- Coordinates: 52°09′48″N 20°12′44″E
- Country: Poland
- Voivodeship: Masovian
- County: Sochaczew
- Gmina: Nowa Sucha

Kolonia Gradowska [kɔˈlɔɲa ɡraˈdɔfska] is a village in the administrative district of Gmina Nowa Sucha, within Sochaczew County, Masovian Voivodeship, in east-central Poland.

In 1975–1998, the village administratively belonged to the Skierniewice Voivodeship.
