= Paulinka, Masovian Voivodship =

Paulinka
- Village
- Location within Poland
- Coordinates: 52°17′48″N 19°56′38″E
- Country: Poland
- Voivodeship: Masovian
- County: Sochaczew
- Gmina: Iłów

Paulinka [pau̯ˈliŋka] is a village in the administrative district of Gmina Iłów, within Sochaczew County, Masovian Voivodeship, in east-central Poland.
