= Braki, Poland =

Braki
- Village
- Location within Poland
- Coordinates: 52°11′17″N 20°6′39″E
- Country: Poland
- Voivodeship: Masovian
- County: Sochaczew
- Gmina: Nowa Sucha

Braki [ˈbraki] is a village in the administrative district of Gmina Nowa Sucha, within Sochaczew County, Masovian Voivodeship, in east-central Poland.
