= Karolków Rybnowski =

Village in Gmina Rybno, Poland

- Village
- Location within Poland
- Coordinates: 52°15′55″N 20°05′21″E
- Country: Poland
- Voivodeship: Masovian
- County: Sochaczew
- Gmina: Rybno

Karolków Rybnowski [kaˈrɔlkuf rɨbˈnɔfski] is a village in the administrative district of Gmina Rybno, within Sochaczew County, Masovian Voivodeship, in east-central Poland.
