= Krzyżyk Iłowski =

Village in Gmina Iłów, Poland

- Village
- Location within Poland
- Coordinates: 52°19′30″N 20°01′36″E
- Country: Poland
- Voivodeship: Masovian
- County: Sochaczew
- Gmina: Iłów

Krzyżyk Iłowski [ˈkʂɨʐɨk iˈwɔfski] is a village in the administrative district of Gmina Iłów, within Sochaczew County, Masovian Voivodeship, in east-central Poland.
