= Ćmiszew Rybnowski =

- Village
- Location within Poland
- Coordinates: 52°14′1″N 20°8′10″E
- Country: Poland
- Voivodeship: Masovian
- County: Sochaczew
- Gmina: Rybno

Ćmiszew Rybnowski [ˈt͡ɕmiʂɛf rɨbˈnɔfski] is a village in the administrative district of Gmina Rybno, within Sochaczew County, Masovian Voivodeship, in east-central Poland.
