= Leonów, Sochaczew County =

Leonów
- Village
- Location within Poland
- Coordinates: 52°10′N 20°13′E
- Country: Poland
- Voivodeship: Masovian
- County: Sochaczew
- Gmina: Nowa Sucha

Leonów [lɛˈɔnuf] is a village in the administrative district of Gmina Nowa Sucha, within Sochaczew County, Masovian Voivodeship, in east-central Poland.
