= Ostrowce, Masovian Voivodeship =

Ostrowce
- Village
- Location within Poland
- Coordinates: 52°16′34″N 19°59′36″E
- Country: Poland
- Voivodeship: Masovian
- County: Sochaczew
- Gmina: Iłów

Ostrowce [ɔsˈtrɔft͡sɛ] is a village in the administrative district of Gmina Iłów, within Sochaczew County, Masovian Voivodeship, in east-central Poland.
