= Złota, Masovian Voivodeship =

Złota
- Village
- Location within Poland
- Coordinates: 52°12′N 20°5′E
- Country: Poland
- Voivodeship: Masovian
- County: Sochaczew
- Gmina: Rybno

Złota [ˈzwɔta] is a village in the administrative district of Gmina Rybno, within Sochaczew County, Masovian Voivodeship, in east-central Poland.
