= Bieliny, Gmina Młodzieszyn =

Bieliny
- Village
- Location within Poland
- Coordinates: 52°18′49″N 20°19′46″E
- Country: Poland
- Voivodeship: Masovian
- County: Sochaczew
- Gmina: Młodzieszyn

Bieliny [bjɛˈlinɨ] is a village in the administrative district of Gmina Młodzieszyn, within Sochaczew County, Masovian Voivodeship, in east-central Poland.
