= Helenka, Masovian Voivodeship =

Helenka
- Village
- Location within Poland
- Coordinates: 52°16′N 20°15′E
- Country: Poland
- Voivodeship: Masovian
- County: Sochaczew
- Gmina: Młodzieszyn

Helenka [xɛˈlɛnka] is a village in the administrative district of Gmina Młodzieszyn, within Sochaczew County, Masovian Voivodeship, in east-central Poland.
