= Nowy Białynin =

- Village
- Location within Poland
- Coordinates: 52°09′47″N 20°14′56″E
- Country: Poland
- Voivodeship: Masovian
- County: Sochaczew
- Gmina: Nowa Sucha

Nowy Białynin [ˈnɔvɨ bjaˈwɨnin] is a village in the administrative district of Gmina Nowa Sucha, within Sochaczew County, Masovian Voivodeship, in east-central Poland.
