= Obory =

Obory may refer to the following places:

- Obory, Chełmno County in Kuyavian-Pomeranian Voivodeship (north-central Poland)
- Obory, Golub-Dobrzyń County in Kuyavian-Pomeranian Voivodeship (north-central Poland)
- Obory, Toruń County in Kuyavian-Pomeranian Voivodeship (north-central Poland)
- Obory, Piaseczno County in Masovian Voivodeship (east-central Poland)
- Obory, Sochaczew County in Masovian Voivodeship (east-central Poland)
- Obory, Konin County in Greater Poland Voivodeship (west-central Poland)
- Obory, Pleszew County in Greater Poland Voivodeship (west-central Poland)
- Obory, Pomeranian Voivodeship (north Poland)
- Obory, Czech Republic
