= Gmina Nowa Sucha =

Gmina Nowa Sucha Nowa Sucha Commune
- Gmina
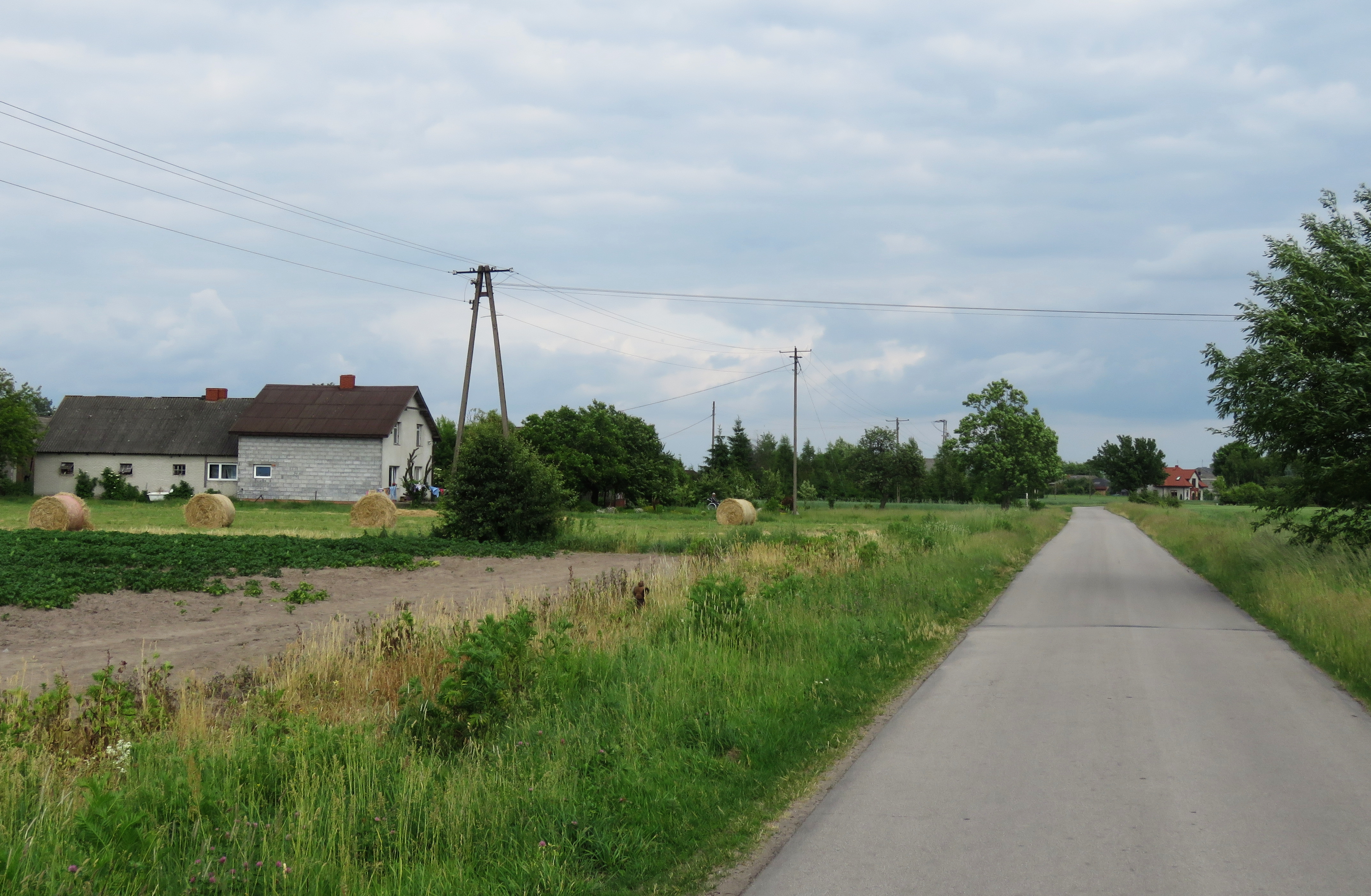

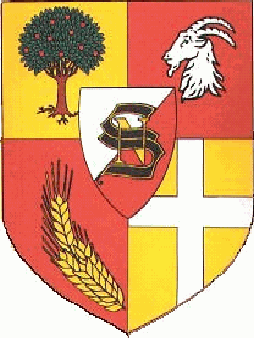
- Coat of arms
- Interactive map of Gmina Nowa Sucha
- Coordinates (Nowa Sucha): 52°10′N 20°10′E
- Country: Poland
- Voivodeship: Masovian
- County: Sochaczew
- Seat: Nowa Sucha

Area
  - Total: 90.34 km^{2} (34.88 sq mi)

Population (2006)
  - Total: 5,966
  - Density: 66.04/km^{2} (171.0/sq mi)
- Website: www.nowasucha.pl

Gmina Nowa Sucha is a rural gmina (administrative district) in Sochaczew County, Masovian Voivodeship, in east-central Poland. Its seat is the village of Nowa Sucha, which lies approximately 9 kilometres (5 mi) south-west of Sochaczew and 57 km (35 mi) south-west of Warsaw.

The gmina covers an area of 90.34 square kilometres (34.9 sq mi), and as of 2006 its total population is 5,966.

== Villages ==
Gmina Nowa Sucha contains the villages and settlements of:

- Antoniew
- Borzymówka
- Braki
- Glinki
- Gradów
- Kolonia Gradowska
- Kornelin
- Kościelna Góra
- Kozłów Biskupi
- Kozłów Szlachecki
- Kurdwanów
- Leonów
- Marysinek
- Mizerka
- Nowa Sucha
- Nowy Białynin
- Nowy Dębsk
- Nowy Kozłów Drugi
- Nowy Kozłów Pierwszy
- Nowy Żylin
- Okopy
- Orłów
- Rokotów
- Roztropna
- Stara Sucha
- Stary Białynin
- Stary Dębsk
- Stary Żylin
- Szeligi
- Wikcinek
- Zakrzew

== Neighbouring gminas ==
Gmina Nowa Sucha is bordered by the town of Sochaczew and by the gminas of Bolimów, Kocierzew Południowy, Nieborów, Rybno, Sochaczew, Teresin and Wiskitki.
