= Szeligi, Sochaczew County =

Szeligi
- Village
- Location within Poland
- Coordinates: 52°09′29″N 20°09′21″E
- Country: Poland
- Voivodeship: Masovian
- County: Sochaczew
- Gmina: Nowa Sucha

Szeligi [ʂɛˈliɡi] is a village in the administrative district of Gmina Nowa Sucha, within Sochaczew County, Masovian Voivodeship, in east-central Poland.
