= Iłów =

- Village
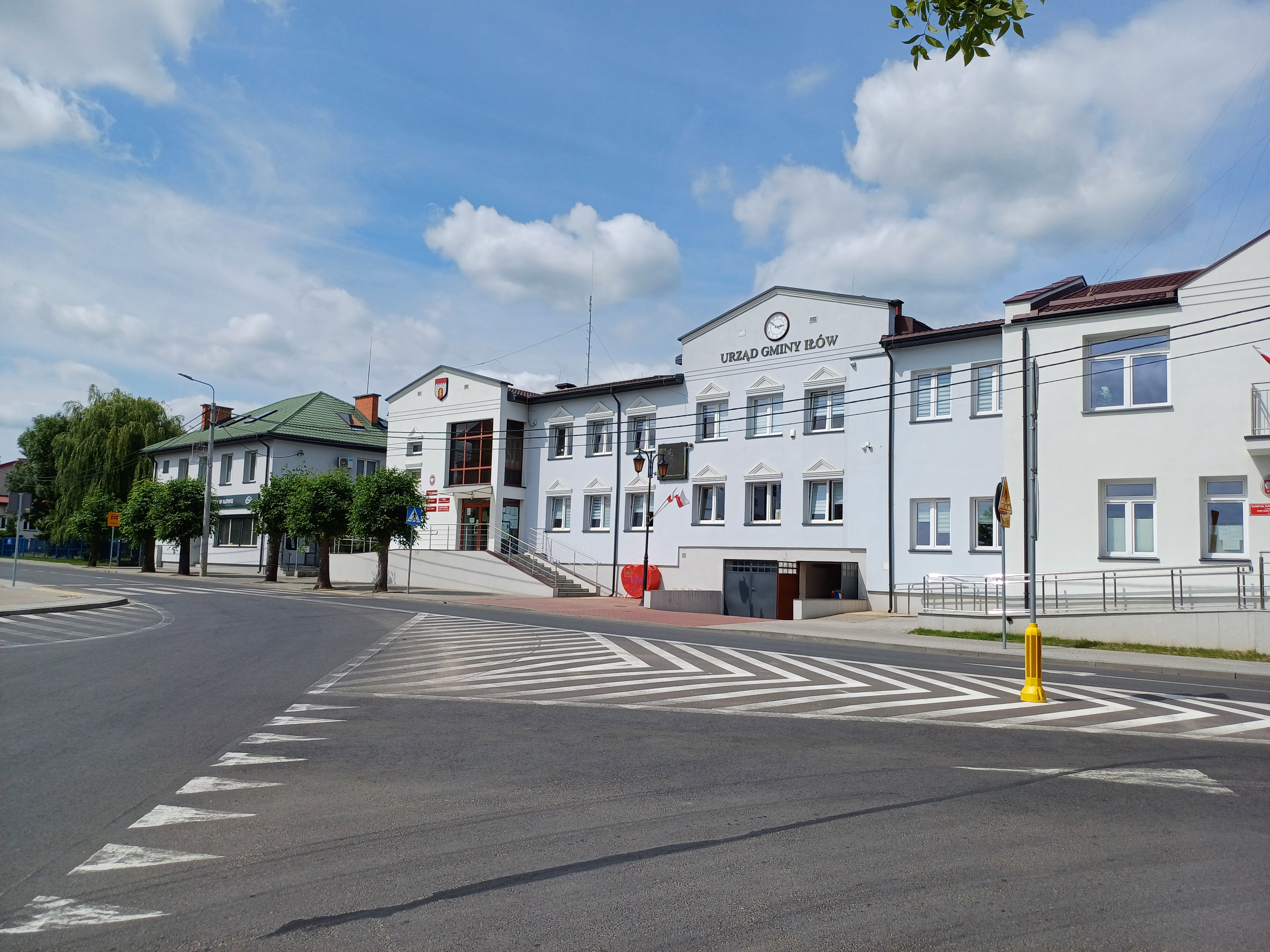
- Gmina office

- Location within Poland
- Coordinates: 52°20′31″N 20°1′46″E
- Country: Poland
- Voivodeship: Masovian
- County: Sochaczew
- Gmina: Iłów

Population
  - Total: 690
- Time zone: UTC+1 (CET)
  - Summer (DST): UTC+2 (CEST)

Iłów [ˈiwuf] is a village in Sochaczew County, Masovian Voivodeship, in central Poland. It is the seat of the gmina (administrative district) called Gmina Iłów.
