= Gmina Iłów =

Gmina Iłów Iłów Commune
- Gmina
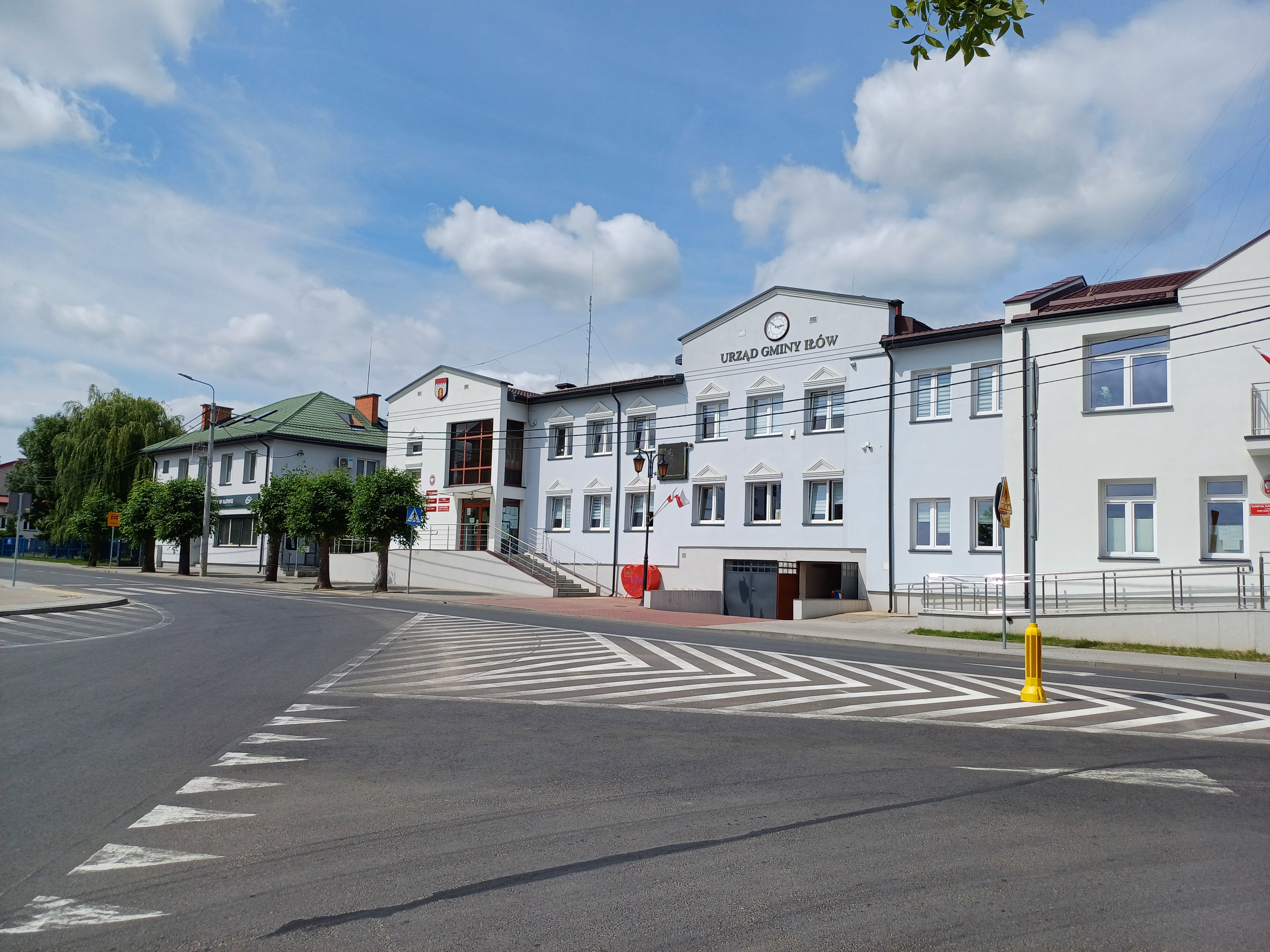
- Municipal office

- Coat of arms
- Interactive map of Gmina Iłów
- Coordinates (Iłów): 52°20′31″N 20°1′46″E
- Country: Poland
- Voivodeship: Masovian
- County: Sochaczew
- Seat: Iłów

Area
  - Total: 128.49 km^{2} (49.61 sq mi)

Population (2006)
  - Total: 6,342
  - Density: 49.36/km^{2} (127.8/sq mi)
- Website: www.ilow.pl

Gmina Iłów is a rural gmina (administrative district) in Sochaczew County, Masovian Voivodeship, in east-central Poland. Its seat is the village of Iłów, which lies approximately 19 kilometres (12 mi) north-west of Sochaczew and 68 km (42 mi) west of Warsaw.

The gmina covers an area of 128.49 square kilometres (49.6 sq mi), and as of 2006 its total population is 6,342.

== Villages ==
Gmina Iłów contains the villages and settlements of:

- Aleksandrów
- Arciechów
- Arciechówek
- Białocin
- Bieniew
- Brzozów Nowy
- Brzozów Stary
- Brzozówek
- Brzozowiec
- Budy Iłowskie
- Dobki
- Emilianów
- Emilianów Załuskowski
- Gilówka Dolna
- Gilówka Górna
- Giżyce
- Giżyczki
- Henryków
- Iłów
- Kaptury
- Karłowo
- Kępa Karolińska
- Krzyżyk Iłowski
- Łady
- Lasotka
- Łaziska
- Leśniaki
- Lubatka
- Miękinki
- Miękiny
- Narty
- Obory
- Olszowiec
- Olunin
- Ostrowce
- Paulinka
- Pieczyska Iłowskie
- Pieczyska Łowickie
- Piotrów
- Piskorzec
- Przejma
- Rokocina
- Rzepki
- Sadowo
- Sewerynów
- Stegna
- Suchodół
- Szarglew
- Uderz
- Wieniec
- Władysławów
- Wola Ładowska
- Wołyńskie
- Wszeliwy
- Zalesie
- Załusków

== Neighbouring gminas ==
Gmina Iłów is bordered by the gminas of Kiernozia, Kocierzew Południowy, Mała Wieś, Młodzieszyn, Rybno, Sanniki, Słubice and Wyszogród.
