= Obory, Sochaczew County =

Obory
- Village
- Location within Poland
- Coordinates: 52°21′12″N 20°04′26″E
- Country: Poland
- Voivodeship: Masovian
- County: Sochaczew
- Gmina: Iłów

Obory [ɔˈbɔrɨ] is a village in the administrative district of Gmina Iłów, within Sochaczew County, Masovian Voivodeship, in east-central Poland.
