= Nowa Sucha, Sochaczew County =

Nowa Sucha
- Village
- Location within Poland
- Coordinates: 52°10′N 20°10′E
- Country: Poland
- Voivodeship: Masovian
- County: Sochaczew
- Gmina: Nowa Sucha

Nowa Sucha [ˈnɔva ˈsuxa] is a village in Sochaczew County, Masovian Voivodeship, in east-central Poland. It is the seat of the gmina (administrative district) called Gmina Nowa Sucha.
