= Józin, Sochaczew County =

Józin
- Village
- Location within Poland
- Coordinates: 52°13′34″N 20°07′22″E
- Country: Poland
- Voivodeship: Masovian
- County: Sochaczew
- Gmina: Rybno

Józin [ˈjuʑin] is a village in the administrative district of Gmina Rybno, within Sochaczew County, Masovian Voivodeship, in east-central Poland.
