= Rokotów =

- Village
- Location within Poland
- Coordinates: 52°11′N 20°15′E
- Country: Poland
- Voivodeship: Masovian
- County: Sochaczew
- Gmina: Nowa Sucha
- Time zone: UTC+1 (CET)
  - Summer (DST): UTC+2 (CEST)

Rokotów [rɔˈkɔtuf] is a village in the administrative district of Gmina Nowa Sucha, within Sochaczew County, Masovian Voivodeship, in east-central Poland.

Six Polish citizens were murdered by Nazi Germany in the village during World War II.
