= Młodzieszyn =

- Village
- Location within Poland
- Coordinates: 52°18′N 20°12′E
- Country: Poland
- Voivodeship: Masovian
- County: Sochaczew
- Gmina: Młodzieszyn
- Population: 1,300

Młodzieszyn [mwɔˈd͡ʑɛʂɨn] is a village in Poland, in Masovian Voivodship. It is the capital of a local gmina and an important local tourist centre.

Młodzieszyn was first mentioned in the 15th century. Back then it was a small village with a wooden church. The first census of 1564 reported a grand manor in that village, built long ago in the times of Dukes of Masovia. By the 17th century, the village grew and became a seat of a local starosta office held by Ludwik Głoszkowski. In 1773, it was annexed by Prussia and another census was organised by the owner of the village, Stanisław Dąbski. Its results are not preserved.

In 1827, there were 76 houses and 626 inhabitants in Młodzieszyn. However, in 1870 the estate of Młodzieszyn was divided and a village of Trojanów was created. Six years later the village had 483 inhabitants. Soon afterwards, the historical palace of Masovian dukes was destroyed by a fire and replaced with a new manor house. It was surrounded with a picturesque park, now only partially preserved. In the early 20th century, the owner of the village and the surrounding estate, Jerzy Iwanicki, had 11.2 square kilometres of land. The family of Iwanicki were the owners of the village until after the World War II, when they were expelled and their property nationalised by the new communist Polish authorities. During World War II, the bellhouse of the local Our Lady's Church was turned by the Germans into a local prison, in which at least 30 prisoners were murdered. The manor house was demolished in 1945, and then rebuilt as a teachers' house.
