= Rybno, Sochaczew County =

Rybno
- Village
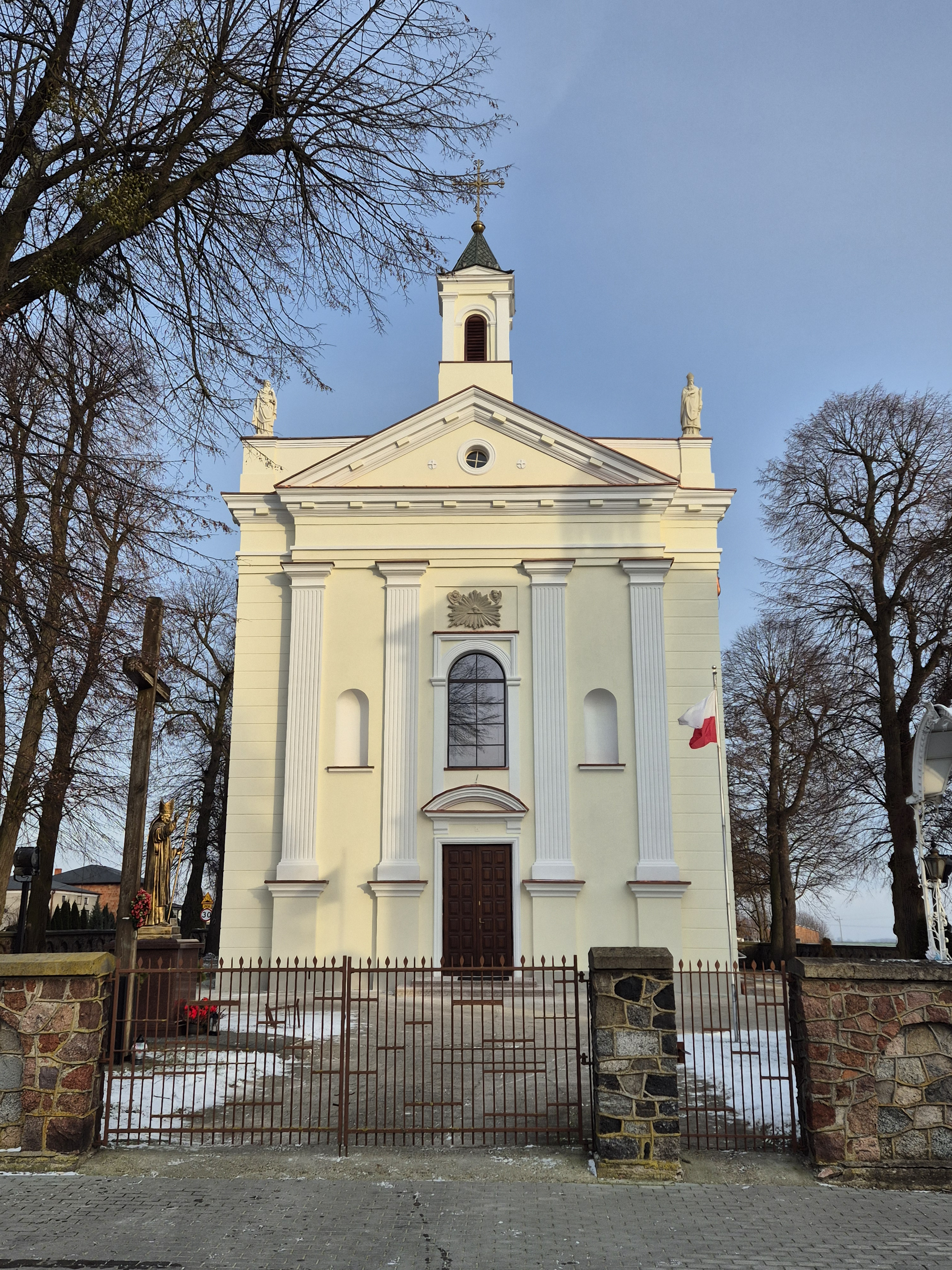
- Church of Saint Bartholomew

- Location within Poland
- Coordinates: 52°14′N 20°6′E
- Country: Poland
- Voivodeship: Masovian
- County: Sochaczew
- Gmina: Rybno

Population
  - Total: 630

Rybno [ˈrɨbnɔ] is a village in Sochaczew County, Masovian Voivodeship, in east-central Poland. It is the seat of the gmina (administrative district) called Gmina Rybno.
