= Nowy Kamion =

- Village
- Location within Poland
- Coordinates: 52°22′15″N 20°12′03″E
- Country: Poland
- Voivodeship: Masovian
- County: Sochaczew
- Gmina: Młodzieszyn

Nowy Kamion [ˈnɔvɨ ˈkamjɔn] is a village in the administrative district of Gmina Młodzieszyn, within Sochaczew County, Masovian Voivodeship, in east-central Poland.
