= Gmina Młodzieszyn =

Gmina Młodzieszyn Młodzieszyn Commune
- Gmina
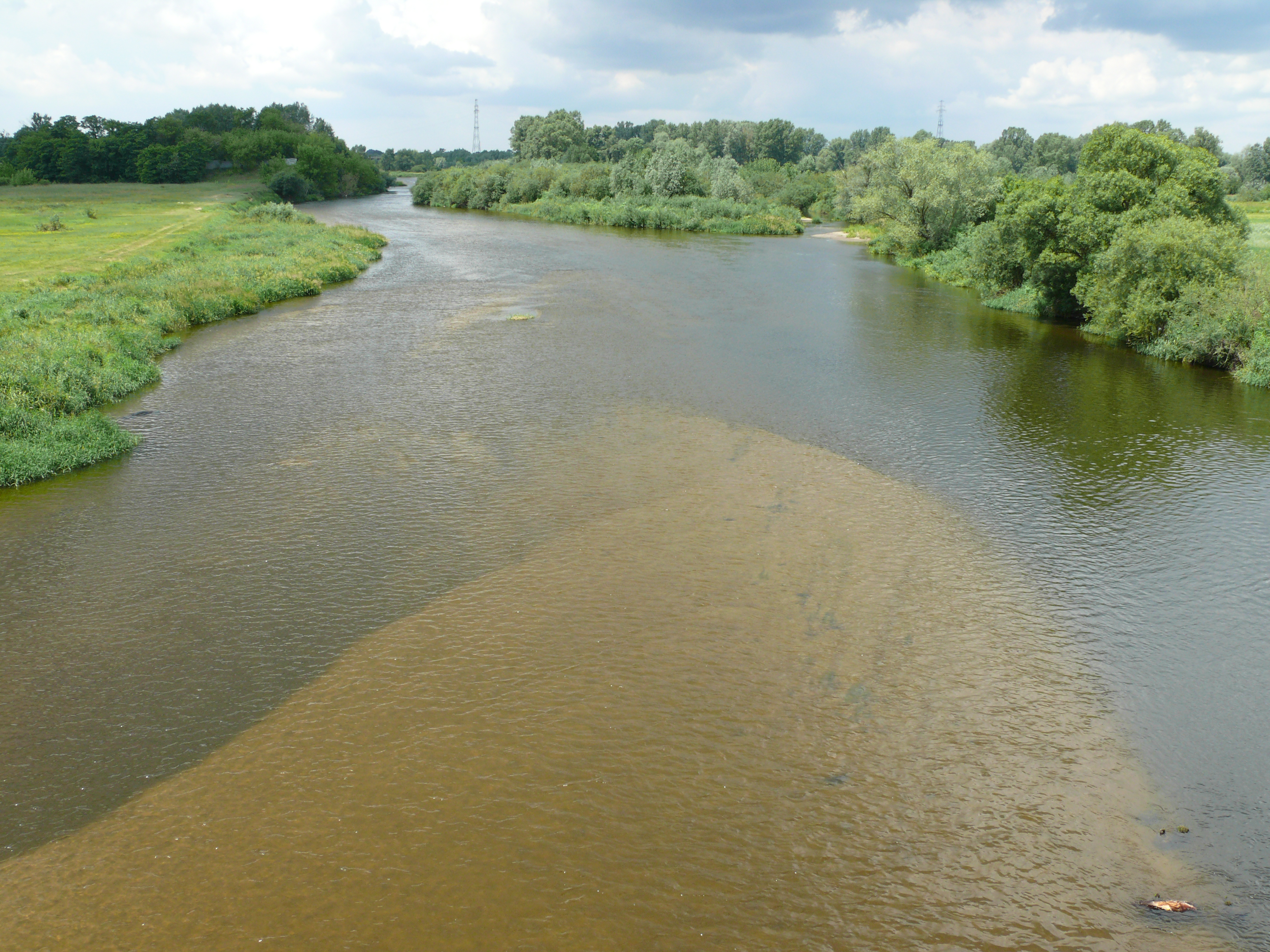

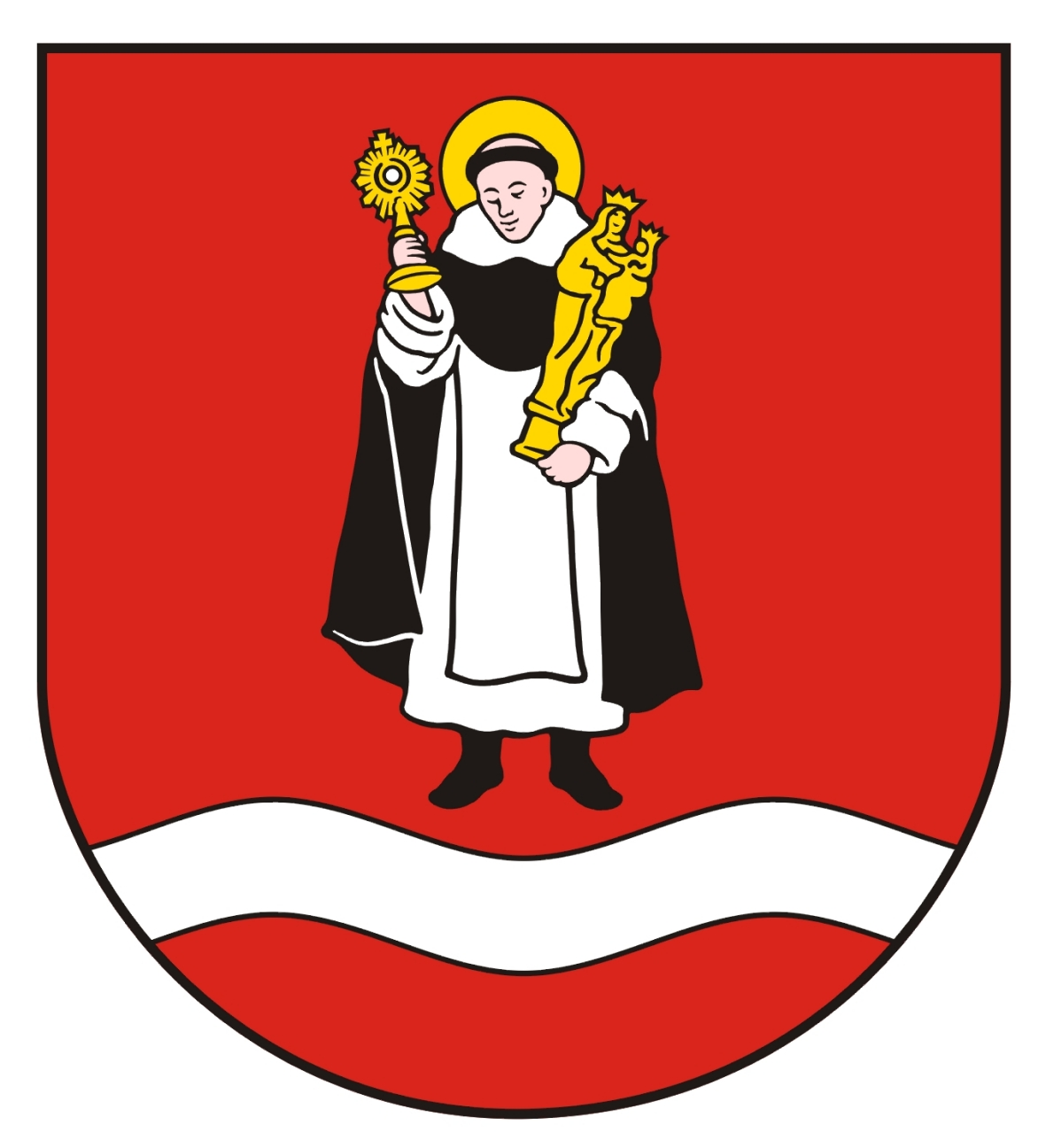
- Coat of arms
- Interactive map of Gmina Młodzieszyn
- Coordinates (Młodzieszyn): 52°18′11″N 20°11′58″E
- Country: Poland
- Voivodeship: Masovian
- County: Sochaczew
- Seat: Młodzieszyn

Area
  - Total: 117.07 km^{2} (45.20 sq mi)

Population (2006)
  - Total: 5,541
  - Density: 47.33/km^{2} (122.6/sq mi)
- Website: mlodzieszyn.pl

Gmina Młodzieszyn is a rural gmina (administrative district) in Sochaczew County, Masovian Voivodeship, in east-central Poland. Its seat is the village of Młodzieszyn, which lies approximately 9 kilometres (6 mi) north of Sochaczew and 56 km (35 mi) west of Warsaw.

The gmina covers an area of 117.07 square kilometres (45.2 sq mi), and as of 2006 its total population is 5,541.

== Villages ==
Gmina Młodzieszyn contains the villages and settlements of:

- Adamowa Góra, Bibiampol
- Bieliny
- Helenka
- Helenów
- Janów
- Januszew
- Juliopol
- Justynów
- Kamion
- Kamion Mały
- Kamion Podgórny
- Leontynów
- Marysin
- Mistrzewice
- Młodzieszyn
- Młodzieszynek
- Nowa Wieś
- Nowe Mistrzewice
- Nowy Kamion
- Olszynki
- Radziwiłka
- Rokicina
- Ruszki
- Skutki
- Stare Budy
- Witkowice

== Neighbouring gminas ==
Gmina Młodzieszyn is bordered by the town of Sochaczew and by the gminas of Brochów, Iłów, Rybno, Sochaczew and Wyszogród.
