= Obora (Plzeň-North District) =

- Municipality
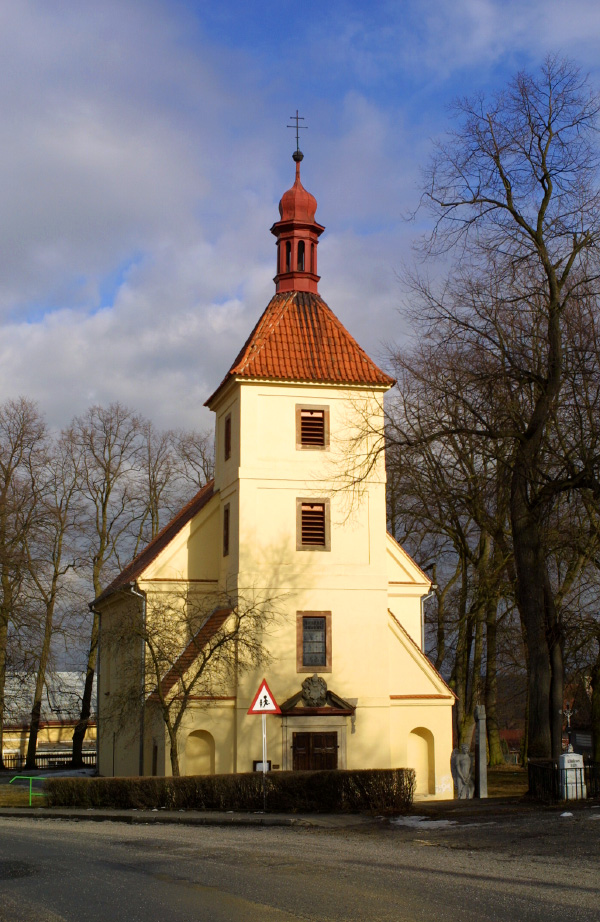
- Church of Saint Michael the Archangel

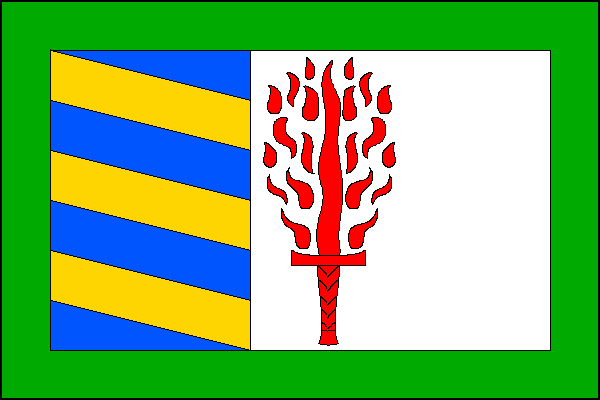
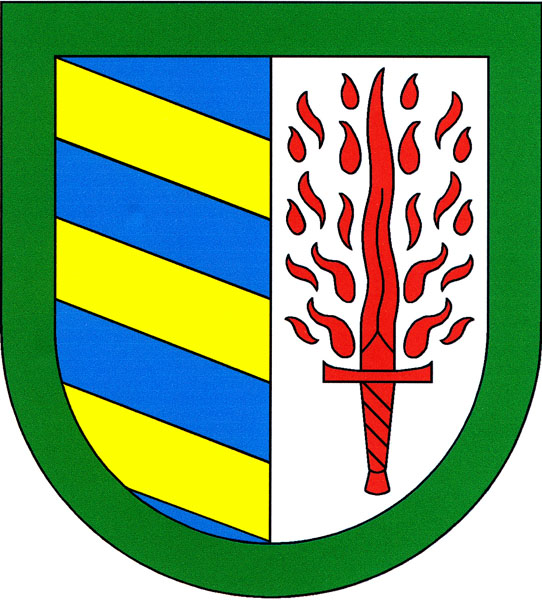
- Flag Coat of arms

- Location in the Czech Republic
- Coordinates: 49°53′22″N 13°24′49″E
- Country: Czech Republic
- Region: Plzeň
- District: Plzeň-North
- First mentioned: 1175

Area
  - Total: 12.70 km^{2} (4.90 sq mi)
- Elevation: 500 m (1,600 ft)

Population (2026-01-01)
  - Total: 582
  - Density: 45.8/km^{2} (119/sq mi)
- Time zone: UTC+1 (CET)
  - Summer (DST): UTC+2 (CEST)
- Postal code: 331 51
- Website: www.obora-ps.cz

Obora is a municipality and village in Plzeň-North District in the Plzeň Region of the Czech Republic. It has about 600 inhabitants.

Obora lies approximately 16 kilometres (10 mi) north of Plzeň and 76 km (47 mi) west of Prague.

== Demographics ==
Historical population
Year	Pop.	±%
1869	455	—
1880	486	+6.8%
1890	478	−1.6%
1900	517	+8.2%
1910	576	+11.4%
1921	613	+6.4%
1930	676	+10.3%
1950	600	−11.2%
1961	613	+2.2%
1970	564	−8.0%
1980	530	−6.0%
1991	471	−11.1%
2001	450	−4.5%
2011	488	+8.4%
2021	545	+11.7%
Source: Censuses
