= Gmina Rybno, Masovian Voivodeship =

Gmina Rybno Rybno Commune
- Gmina
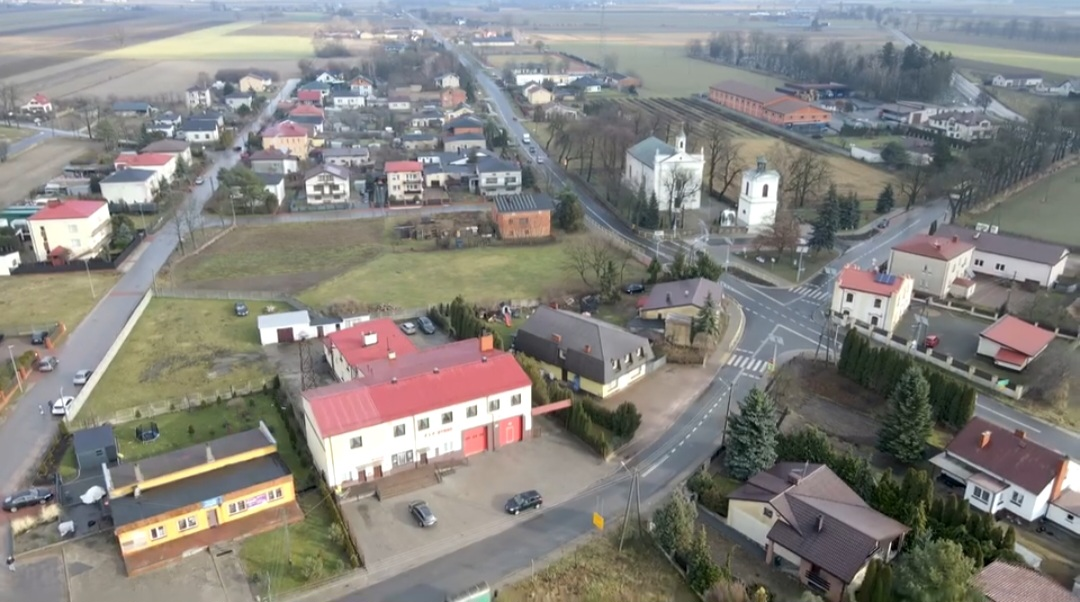

- Flag Coat of arms
- Interactive map of Gmina Rybno
- Coordinates (Rybno): 52°14′N 20°6′E
- Country: Poland
- Voivodeship: Masovian
- County: Sochaczew
- Seat: Rybno

Area
  - Total: 72.84 km^{2} (28.12 sq mi)

Population (2006)
  - Total: 3,494
  - Density: 47.97/km^{2} (124.2/sq mi)
- Website: www.rybno.waw.pl

Gmina Rybno is a rural gmina (administrative district) in Sochaczew County, Masovian Voivodeship, in east-central Poland. Its seat is the village of Rybno, which lies approximately 10 kilometres (6 mi) north-west of Sochaczew and 62 km (38 mi) west of Warsaw.

The gmina covers an area of 72.84 square kilometres (28.1 sq mi), and as of 2006 its total population is 3,494.

== Villages ==
Gmina Rybno contains the villages and settlements of:

- Aleksandrów
- Antosin
- Bronisławy
- Ćmiszew Rybnowski
- Ćmiszew-Parcel
- Cypriany
- Erminów
- Jasieniec
- Józin
- Kamieńszczyzna
- Karolków Rybnowski
- Karolków Szwarocki
- Konstantynów
- Koszajec
- Ludwików
- Matyldów
- Nowa Wieś
- Nowy Szwarocin
- Rybionek
- Rybno
- Sarnów
- Stary Szwarocin
- Wesoła
- Wężyki
- Złota
- Zofiówka

== Neighbouring gminas ==
Gmina Rybno is bordered by the gminas of Iłów, Kocierzew Południowy, Młodzieszyn, Nowa Sucha and Sochaczew.
