= Obora (Blansko District) =

- Municipality
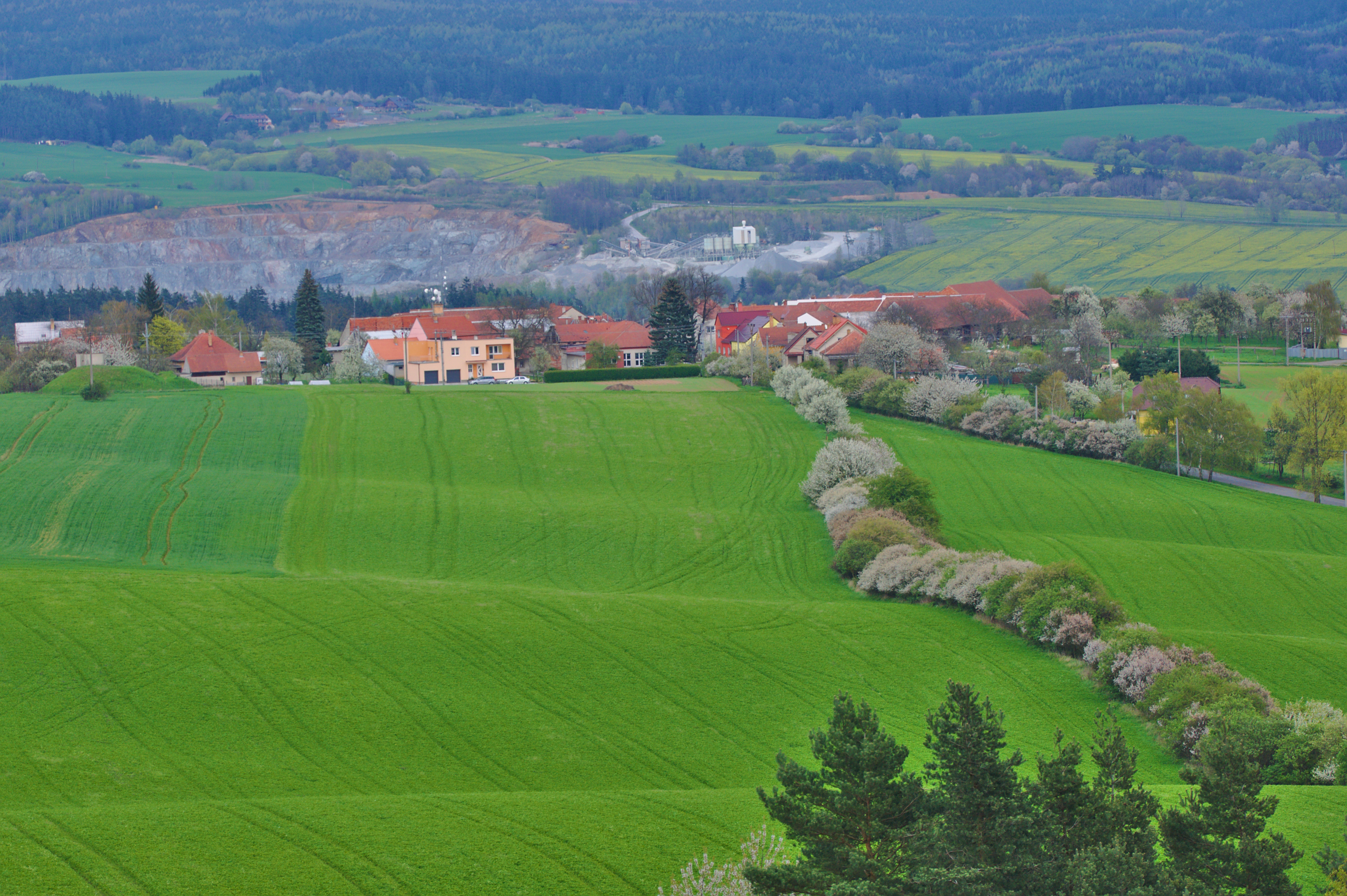
- View from the west

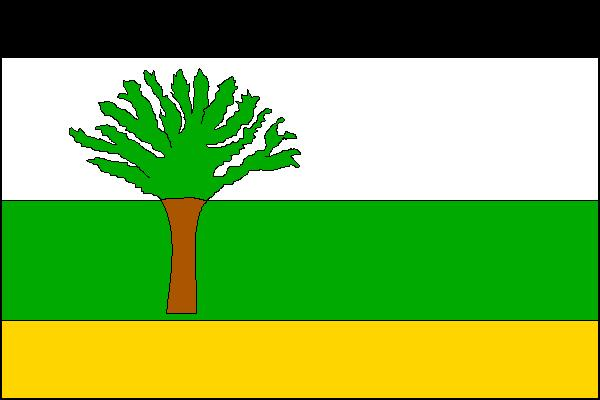
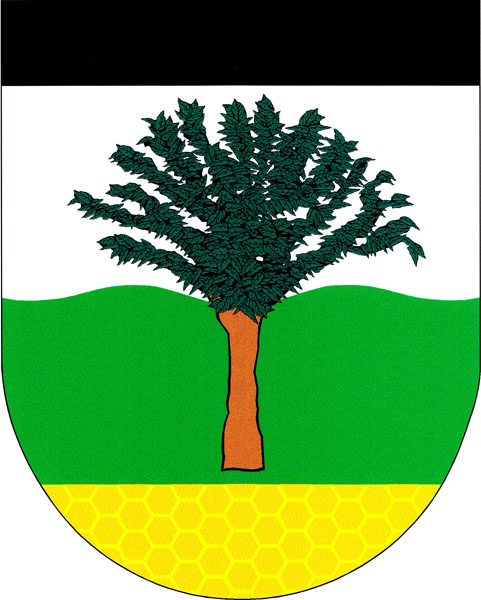
- Flag Coat of arms

- Location in the Czech Republic
- Coordinates: 49°27′8″N 16°36′20″E
- Country: Czech Republic
- Region: South Moravian
- District: Blansko
- First mentioned: 1360

Area
  - Total: 4.26 km^{2} (1.64 sq mi)
- Elevation: 413 m (1,355 ft)

Population (2026-01-01)
  - Total: 365
  - Density: 85.7/km^{2} (222/sq mi)
- Time zone: UTC+1 (CET)
  - Summer (DST): UTC+2 (CEST)
- Postal code: 679 01
- Website: www.obecobora.cz

Obora is a municipality and village in Blansko District in the South Moravian Region of the Czech Republic. It has about 400 inhabitants.

Obora lies approximately 11 kilometres (7 mi) north of Blansko, 29 km (18 mi) north of Brno, and 172 km (107 mi) south-east of Prague.

== Demographics ==
Historical population
Year	Pop.	±%
1869	285	—
1880	335	+17.5%
1890	328	−2.1%
1900	375	+14.3%
1910	458	+22.1%
1921	425	−7.2%
1930	411	−3.3%
1950	381	−7.3%
1961	418	+9.7%
1970	407	−2.6%
1980	347	−14.7%
1991	296	−14.7%
2001	289	−2.4%
2011	299	+3.5%
2021	338	+13.0%
Source: Censuses
