= Obora (Louny District) =

- Municipality
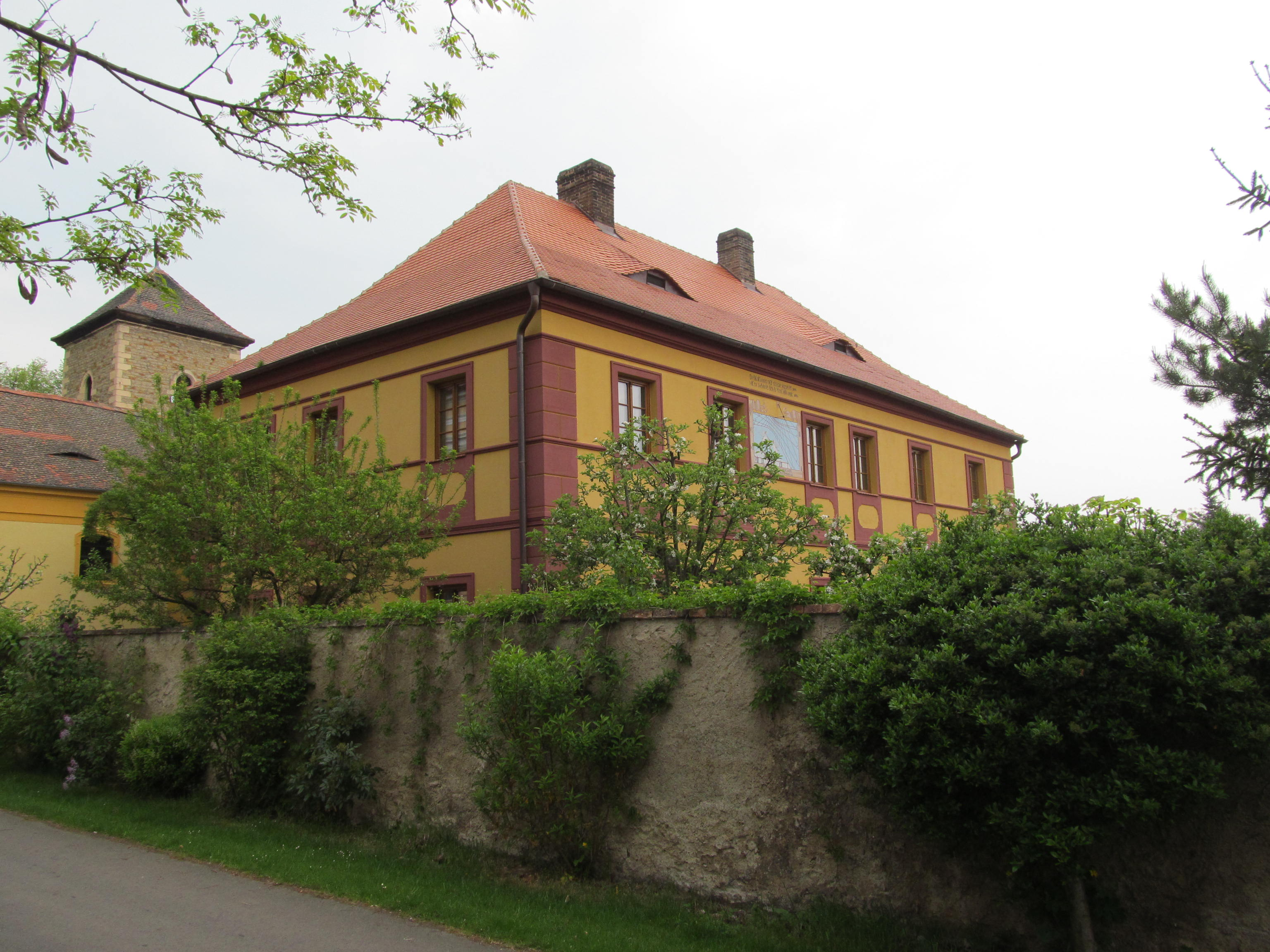
- Rectory

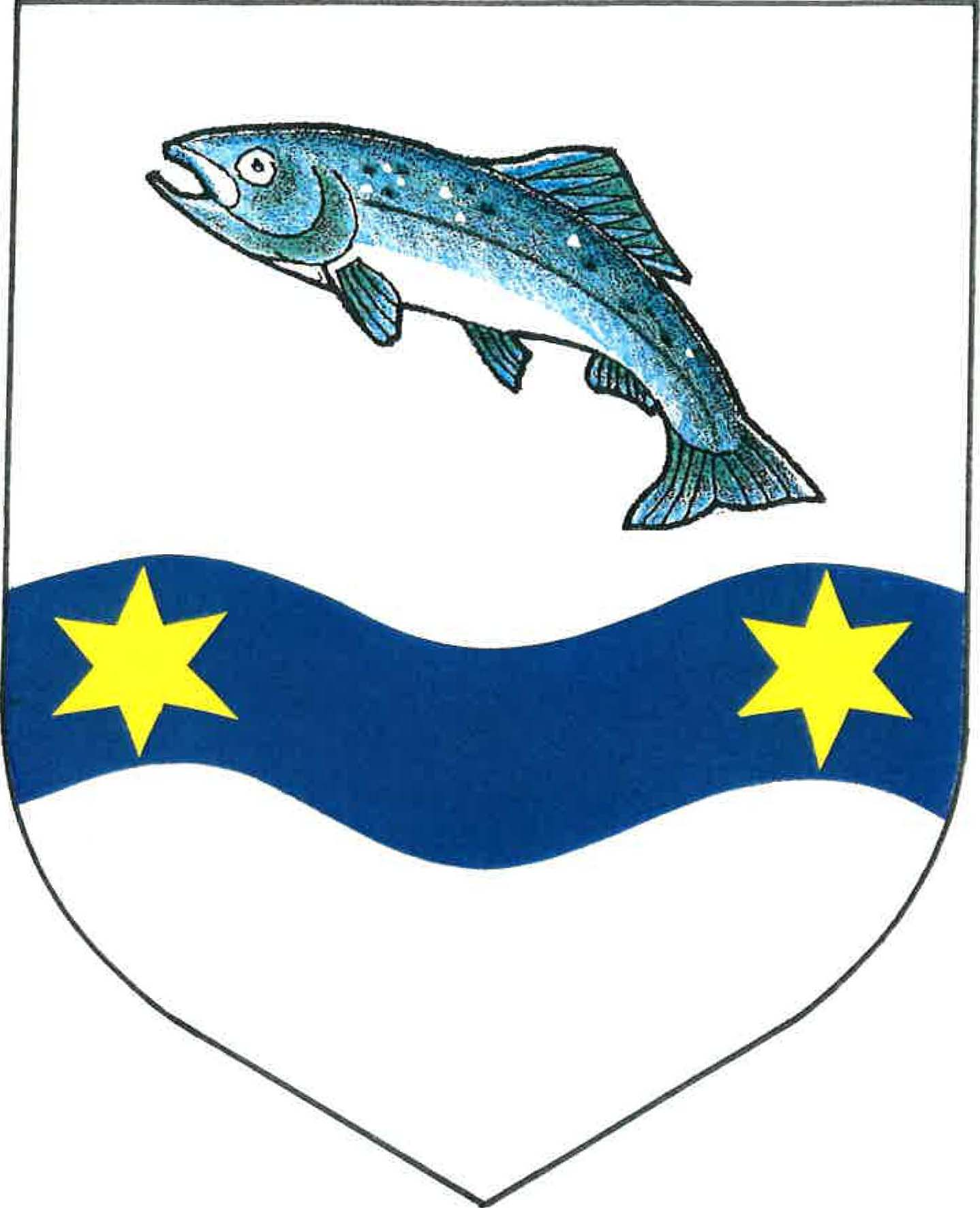
- Flag Coat of arms

- Location in the Czech Republic
- Coordinates: 50°22′24″N 13°51′47″E
- Country: Czech Republic
- Region: Ústí nad Labem
- District: Louny
- First mentioned: 1268

Area
  - Total: 5.29 km^{2} (2.04 sq mi)
- Elevation: 175 m (574 ft)

Population (2026-01-01)
  - Total: 440
  - Density: 83/km^{2} (220/sq mi)
- Time zone: UTC+1 (CET)
  - Summer (DST): UTC+2 (CEST)
- Postal code: 440 01
- Website: www.ouobora.cz

Obora is a municipality and village in Louny District in the Ústí nad Labem Region of the Czech Republic. It has about 400 inhabitants.

Obora lies approximately 6 kilometres (4 mi) east of Louny, 35 km (22 mi) south of Ústí nad Labem, and 50 km (31 mi) north-west of Prague.

== Demographics ==
Historical population
Year	Pop.	±%
1869	247	—
1880	278	+12.6%
1890	245	−11.9%
1900	280	+14.3%
1910	344	+22.9%
1921	386	+12.2%
1930	399	+3.4%
1950	283	−29.1%
1961	278	−1.8%
1970	277	−0.4%
1980	243	−12.3%
1991	246	+1.2%
2001	299	+21.5%
2011	379	+26.8%
2021	434	+14.5%
Source: Censuses
