= Obory, Czech Republic =

Obory
- Municipality
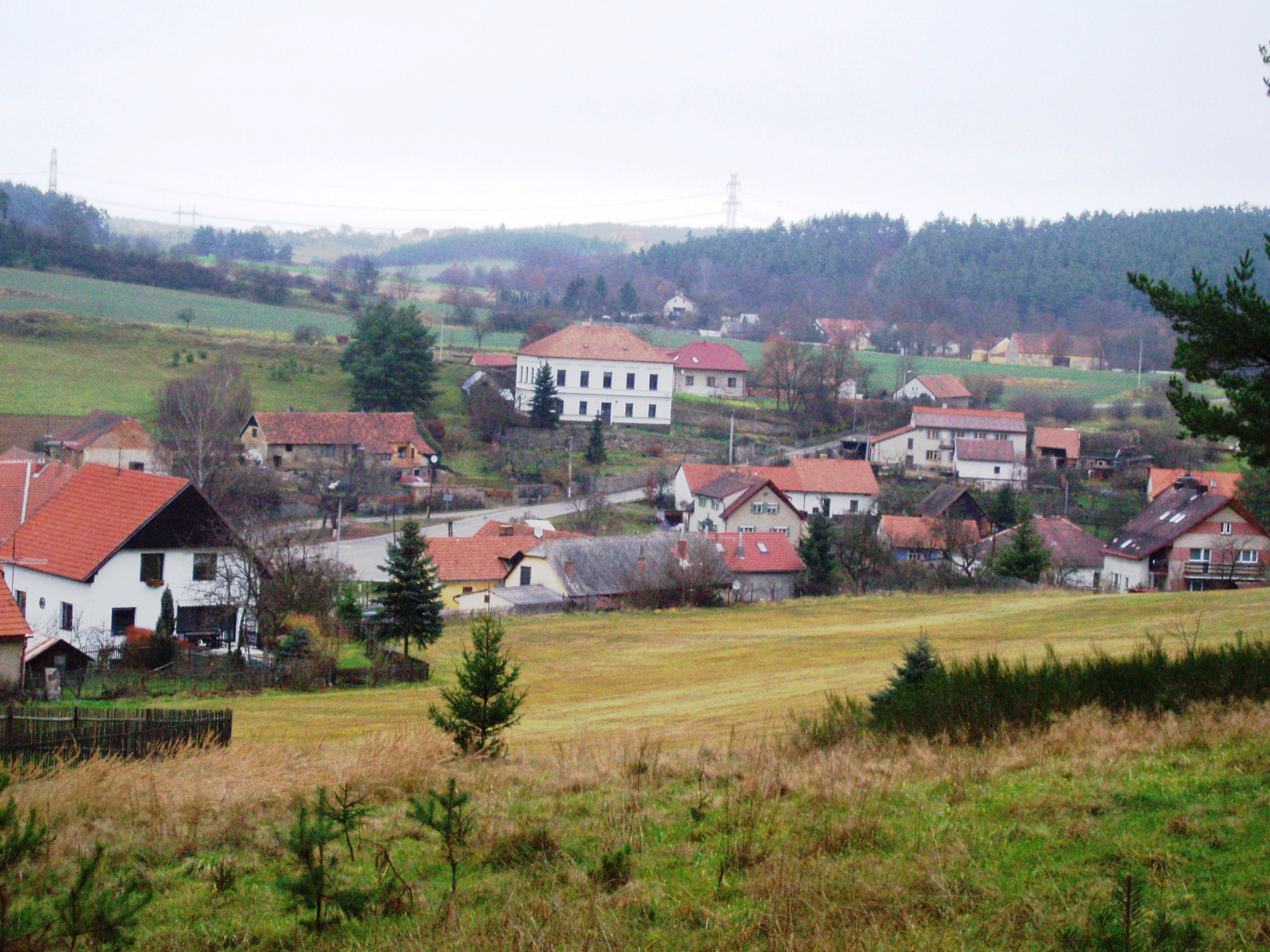
- General view

- Location in the Czech Republic
- Coordinates: 49°40′50″N 14°12′59″E
- Country: Czech Republic
- Region: Central Bohemian
- District: Příbram
- First mentioned: 1572

Area
  - Total: 10.34 km^{2} (3.99 sq mi)
- Elevation: 365 m (1,198 ft)

Population (2026-01-01)
  - Total: 280
  - Density: 27/km^{2} (70/sq mi)
- Time zone: UTC+1 (CET)
  - Summer (DST): UTC+2 (CEST)
- Postal code: 263 01
- Website: www.obecobory.cz

Obory is a municipality and village in Příbram District in the Central Bohemian Region of the Czech Republic. It has about 300 inhabitants.

== Administrative division ==
Obory consists of two municipal parts (in brackets population according to the 2021 census):

- Obory (252)
- Vápenice (2)

== Etymology ==
The name literally means 'game reserves' in Czech.

== Geography ==
Obory is located about 15 kilometres (9 mi) east of Příbram and 41 km (25 mi) south of Prague. It lies in the Benešov Uplands. The highest point is a nameless hill at 483 m (1,585 ft) above sea level. The stream Jindrovský potok flows through the municipality.

== History ==
The first written mention of Obory is from 1572.

== Demographics ==
Historical population

Year	Pop.	±%
1869	494	—
1880	459	−7.1%
1890	548	+19.4%
1900	534	−2.6%
1910	499	−6.6%

Year	Pop.	±%
1921	481	−3.6%
1930	458	−4.8%
1950	345	−24.7%
1961	330	−4.3%
1970	321	−2.7%

Year	Pop.	±%
1980	284	−11.5%
1991	263	−7.4%
2001	258	−1.9%
2011	258	+0.0%
2021	254	−1.6%

Source: Censuses

== Transport ==
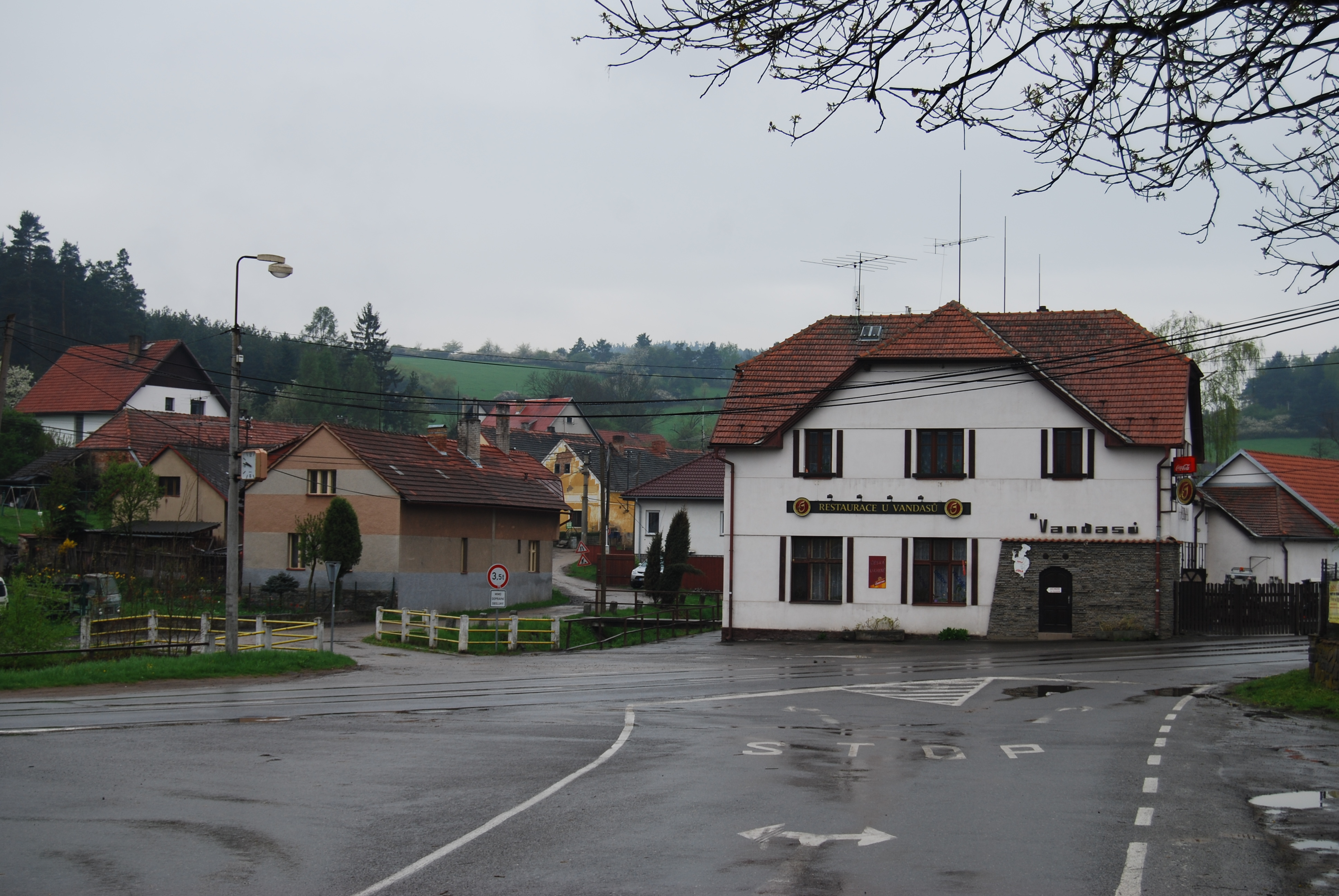
Centre of Obory

The I/18 road (the section from Příbram to Sedlčany) runs through the municipality.

== Sights ==
The only protected cultural monument in the municipality is a Baroque calvary dating from 1727.
