= Sochaczew County =

Sochaczew County Powiat sochaczewski
- County
- Flag Coat of arms

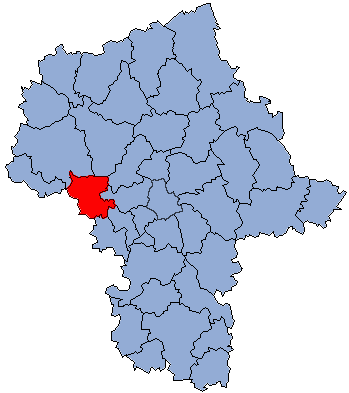
- Location within the voivodeship

- Division into gminas
- Coordinates (Sochaczew): 52°13′45″N 20°14′19″E
- Country: Poland
- Voivodeship: Masovian
- Seat: Sochaczew
- Gminas: Total 8 (incl. 1 urban): Sochaczew; Gmina Brochów; Gmina Iłów; Gmina Młodzieszyn; Gmina Nowa Sucha; Gmina Rybno; Gmina Sochaczew; Gmina Teresin

Area
  - Total: 731.02 km^{2} (282.25 sq mi)

Population (2019)
  - Total: 85,024
  - Density: 116.31/km^{2} (301.24/sq mi)
  - Urban: 36,327
  - Rural: 48,697
- Car plates: WSC
- Website: www.starostwo-soch.home.pl

Sochaczew County (Polish: powiat sochaczewski) is a unit of territorial administration and local government (powiat) in Masovian Voivodeship, east-central Poland. It came into being on 1 January 1999, as a result of the Polish local government reforms passed in 1998. Its administrative seat and only town is Sochaczew, which lies 52 kilometres (32 mi) west of Warsaw.

The county covers an area of 731.02 square kilometres (282.2 sq mi). As of 2019, the county's total population is 85,024, out of which the population of Sochaczew is 36,327, and the rural population is 48,697.

== Neighbouring counties ==
Sochaczew County is bordered by Płońsk County to the north, Nowy Dwór County to the north-east, Warsaw West County and Grodzisk County to the east, Żyrardów County to the south-east, Skierniewice County to the south, Łowicz County to the south-west, Gostynin County to the west, and Płock County to the north-west.

== Administrative divisions ==
The county is subdivided into eight gminas (one urban and seven rural). These are listed in the following table, in descending order of population.

Gmina	Type	Area (km^{2})	Population (2019)	Seat
Sochaczew	urban	26.1	36,327	
Gmina Teresin	rural	88.0	11,511	Teresin
Gmina Sochaczew	rural	91.4	10,944	Sochaczew *
Gmina Nowa Sucha	rural	90.3	6,670	Nowa Sucha
Gmina Iłów	rural	128.5	6,168	Iłów
Gmina Młodzieszyn	rural	117.1	5,557	Młodzieszyn
Gmina Brochów	rural	116.8	4,379	Brochów
Gmina Rybno	rural	72.8	3,468	Rybno
* seat not part of the gmina
