= Żabikowo, Luboń =

Żabikowo
- Neighbourhood
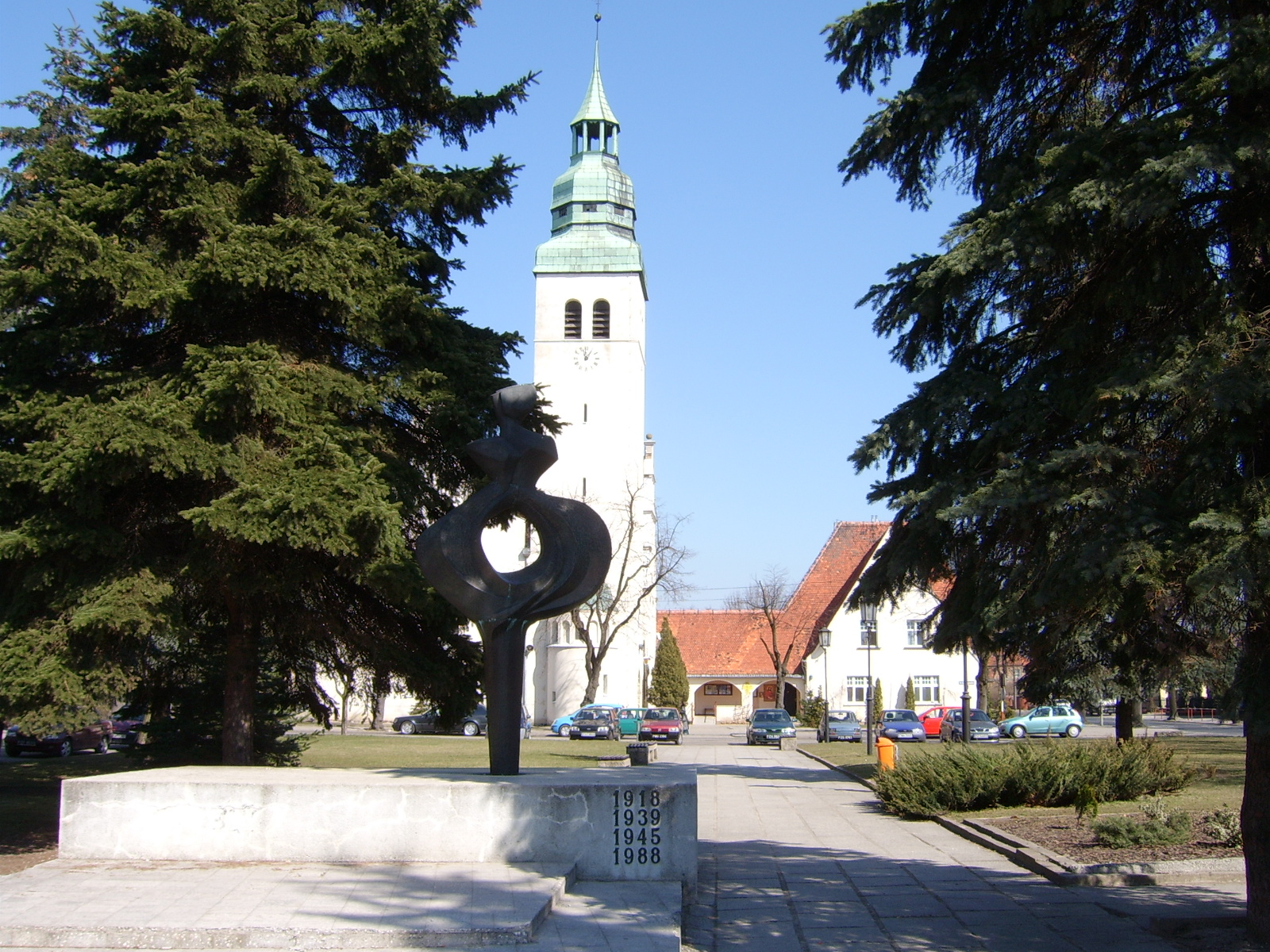
- Saint Barbara Church

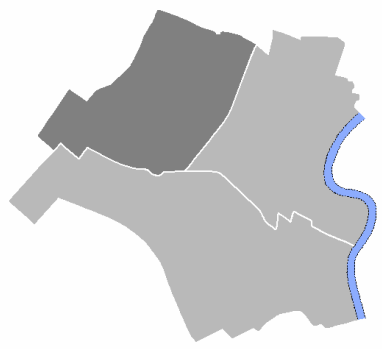
- Location of Żabikowo (in red) within Luboń
- Coordinates: 52°20′51″N 16°51′47″E
- Country: Poland
- Voivodeship: Greater Poland
- County: Poznań County
- Town: Luboń
- First mention: 1283
- Incorporated into town limits: 13 November 1954
- Time zone: UTC+1 (CET)
  - Summer (DST): UTC+2 (CEST)
- Postal code: 62-030
- Telephone code: (+48) 61
- Vehicle registration: POZ; PZ
- SIMC: 0971005
- Primary airport: Poznań–Ławica Airport

Żabikowo is a district of Luboń, Poland, located in the western part of the town, however without an administrative function.

== History ==
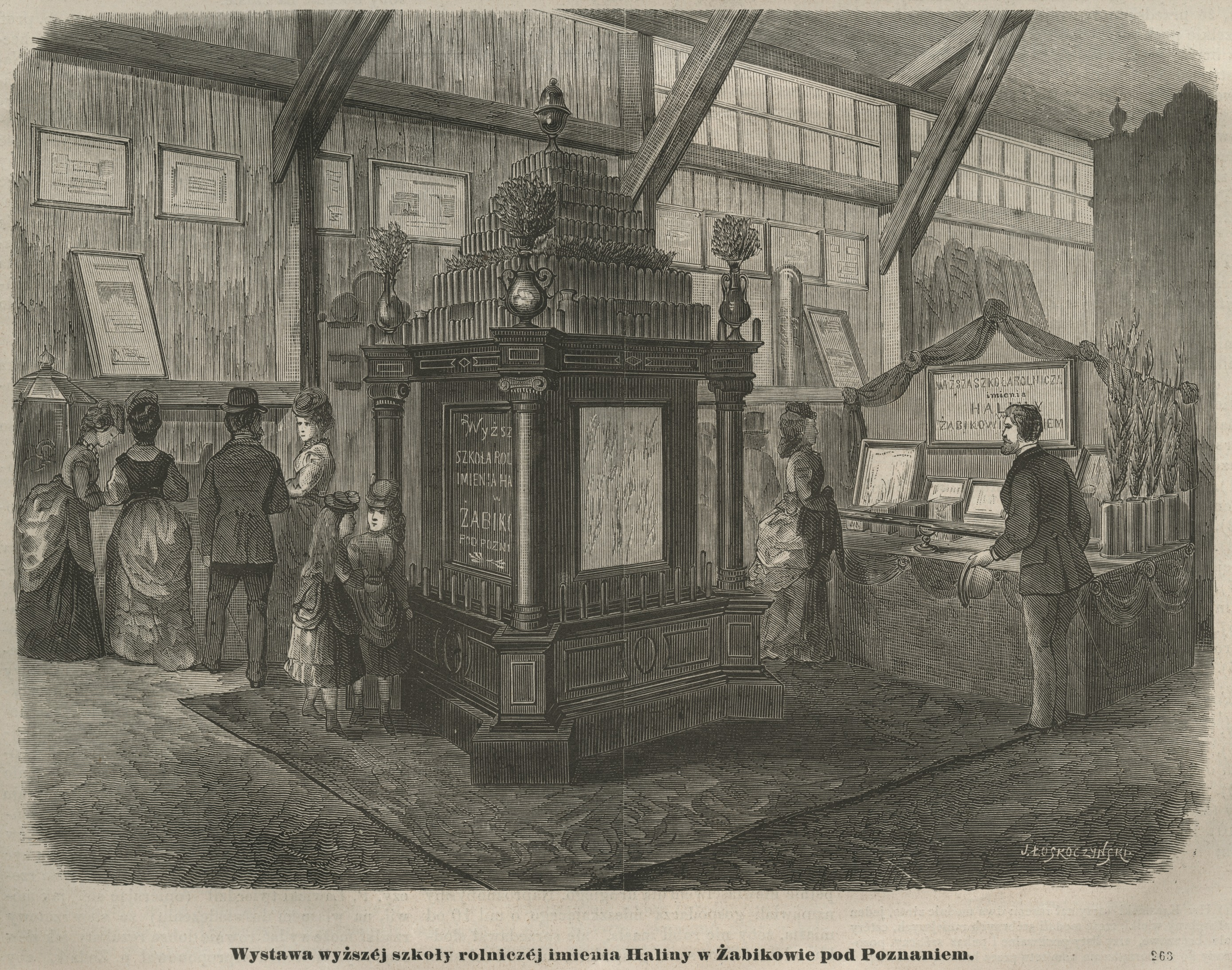
College of Agriculture in Żabikowo in the 1870s

The oldest known mention of Żabikowo dates back to 1283. Żabikowo was a private church village, administratively located in the Poznań County in the Poznań Voivodeship in the Greater Poland Province of the Kingdom of Poland. It was annexed by Prussia in the Second Partition of Poland in 1793. After the successful Greater Poland uprising of 1806, it was regained by Poles and included within the short-lived Duchy of Warsaw. After the duchy's dissolution in 1815, it was reannexed by Prussia, and from 1871 it was also part of Germany. In 1870, a College of Agriculture (Wyższa Szkoła Rolnicza) was established in Żabikowo, as a Polish college, and was forced to close in 1876 as a result of anti-Polish policies of the German authorities. Following World War I, Poland regained independence and control of the village.

During the Nazi occupation in World War II the Germans established a forced labour camp for Jews called Poggenburg. In 1943–1945 Żabikowo was also the site of a Nazi prison camp, which replaced the Fort VII camp in western Poznań, and in which over 20,000 people were imprisoned. The prisoners were mainly members of the Polish resistance movement, but also Luxembourgers, Dutch, Hungarians, Slovaks, Americans, Soviet prisoners of war and deserters from the Wehrmacht. Prisoners were subjected to inhuman living conditions, torture and executions. On January 19, 1945, the camp was dissolved and the prisoners were sent either by rail or on a death march to the Sachsenhausen concentration camp. On the same day, the Germans massacred prisoners who were sick and unable to march. Three days later, the SS carried out another massacre, this time of 33 Poles. There is a museum and a monument entitled Nigdy wojny ("Never War") by Józef Gosławski, as well other monuments to various people imprisoned and murdered in the camp.

It was given town rights and incorporated into the newly created town of Luboń on 13 November 1954.
