= Adam Mickiewicz Monument, Gorzów Wielkopolski =

Monument in Lubusz Voivodeship, Poland

Coordinates: 52°43′49″N 15°13′45″E

Monument of Adam Mickiewicz
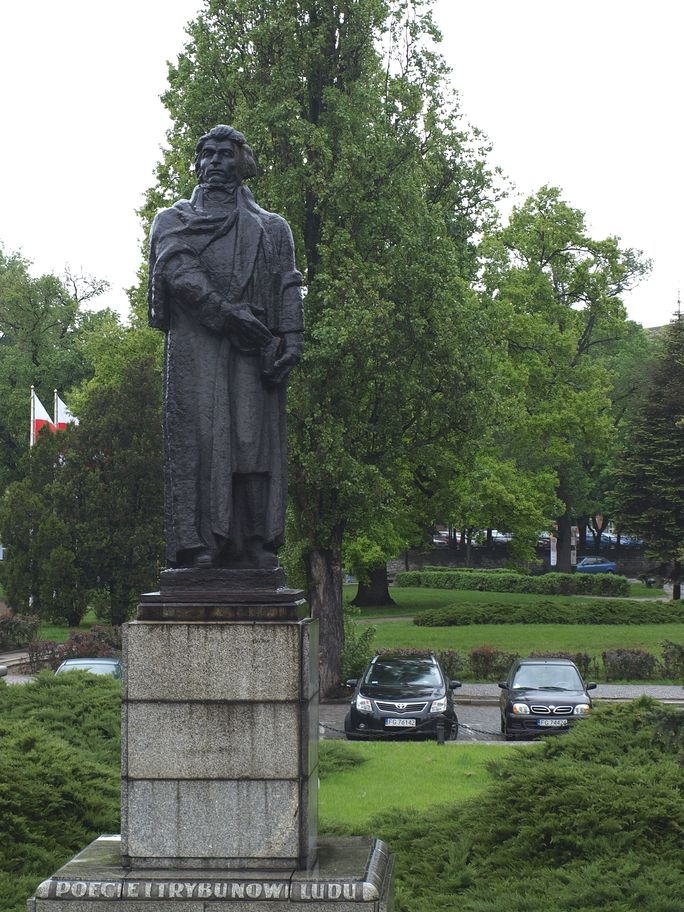
- Artist: Józef Gosławski
- Year: 1957
- Location: Poland, Gorzów Wielkopolski

The Adam Mickiewicz monument in Gorzów Wielkopolski is a notable Gorzów Wielkopolski statue, located near a cross of Lwów Eaglets Street and Władysław Sikorski Street. The monument was designed by Józef Gosławski.

== History ==
The first monument erected by Poles in Gorzów Wielkopolski was to be the Freedom Monument. At the end of 1945, the starosty laid the foundation stone and the erection act. Then the work was stopped. Ten years later, the manager of the Juliusz Osterwa Theatre, Leon Haegenbarth, proposed to commemorate Adam Mickiewicz, whose centenary of death was just being celebrated. The idea was supported by the Municipal National Council and the Social Building Committee was established. It was chaired by Dr. Edward Stapf. The committee announced a fundraising in schools and workplaces. A tax of five pence in the price of tram tickets was also introduced in Gorzów for this purpose. The project was prepared by the Poznań-based sculptor Józef Gosławski, author of the Fryderyk Chopin monument in Żelazowa Wola, among others. As the bronze turned out to be too expensive, the figure of the bard was made of cast iron. The cast was produced by the Mechanical Plants "Gorzów" (Polish: Zakłady Mechaniczne "Gorzów"). Funds for monument came from contributions of local society. In Gosławski's design, Mickiewicz held a pen in his left hand and a book in his right hand. Members of the Social Construction Committee decided that the pen should be removed and the left hand should point to the book. As a result, it is 20 cm longer than the right hand. The ceremonial unveiling of the monument took place on 15 December 1957.

The Mickiewicz monument has permanently inscribed itself in the panorama of Gorzów Wielkopolski, but for the following decades it did not evoke much emotion. It was remembered in 2008 on the occasion of the European Football Championship, to which the Polish team was promoted for the first time in history. It was then included in the social campaign "In Poland even monuments cheer for ours". Mickiewicz was then dressed in a white and red T-shirt of the Poland national team. Once again, the monument became famous when, due to the Sikorski Street reconstruction project, the City Council had to give its consent to move it by 12 meters. So that it would not stand in the middle of the roundabout planned for its place. During the stormy debates, the issue that Mickiewicz's sculpture has one hand 20 cm longer and should be shortened on that occasion came back. Controversy was also aroused by the fact that the displaced monument may stand backwards to the nearby Józef Piłsudski monument on Kasztanka. Ultimately, it was decided that Mickiewicz's sculpture would not be reworked and would take an exposed place, without colliding with Piłsudski's monument. The whole operation is still in the sphere of plans.

== Contemporary importance ==
The Adam Mickiewicz monument was the first Polish monument erected in Gorzów Wielkopolski. At the same time, the first monument of the poet in the Zielona Góra Province and the second in the Western Territories. Despite its precursor, its role as a place of remembrance was for a long time unknown and only of local significance. The ceremonies were usually organized at the site occasionally, in connection with the anniversaries of the poet's birth or death. The monument remained present in tourist guides, but it is difficult to speak of its special distinction as an attraction for visitors. It was only the need to move and the discussion of this project by the local authorities and in the regional media that animated public interest in the monument. And school students from the Secondary School in Gorzów started to organize happenings at Mickiewicz Street to symbolize, among other things, the moving of the monument.

== Gallery ==
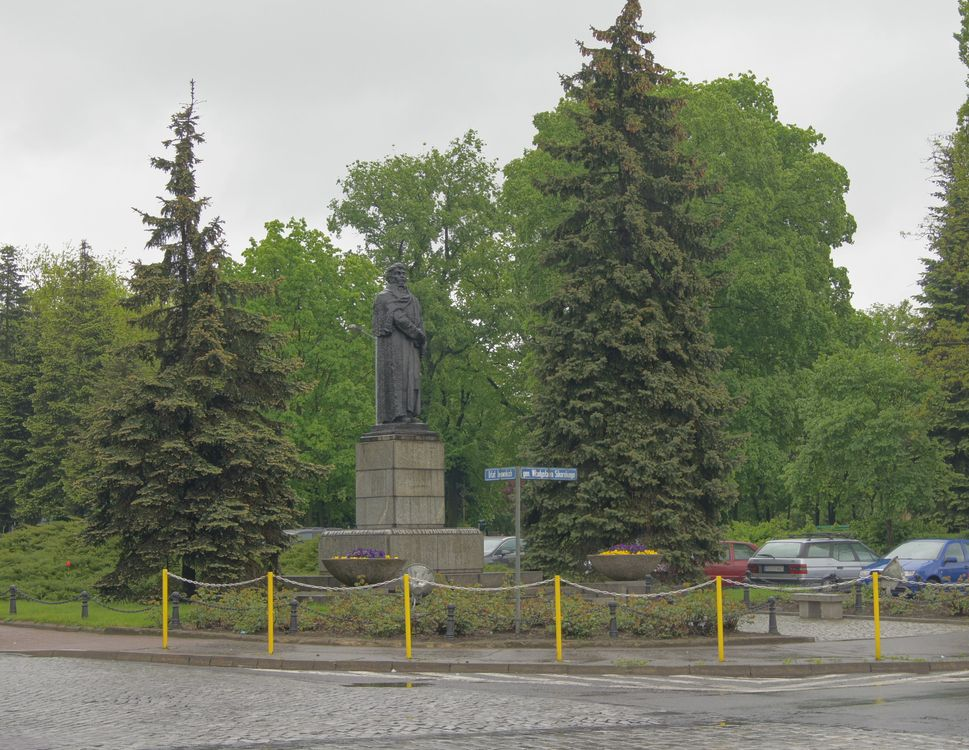
The view from afar

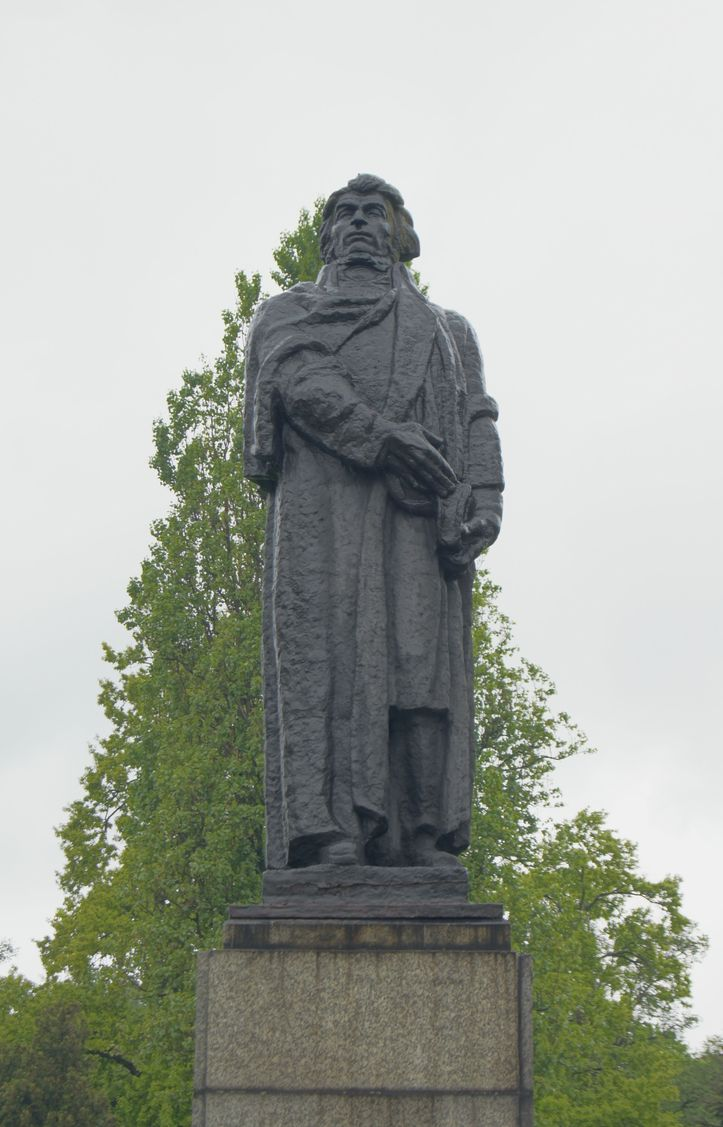
The statue of Adam Mickiewicz

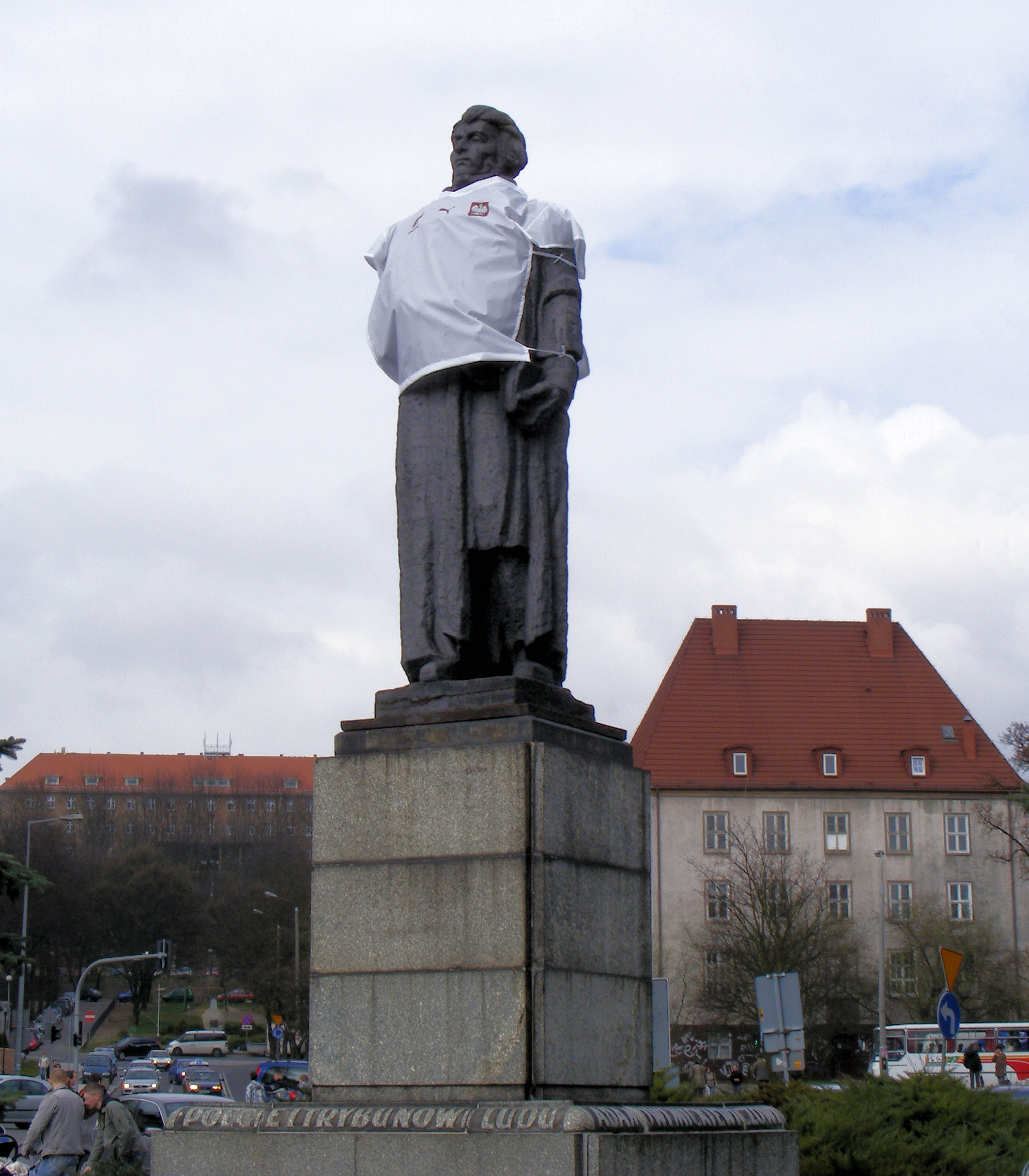
The statue wearing sport T-shirt of Polish national team

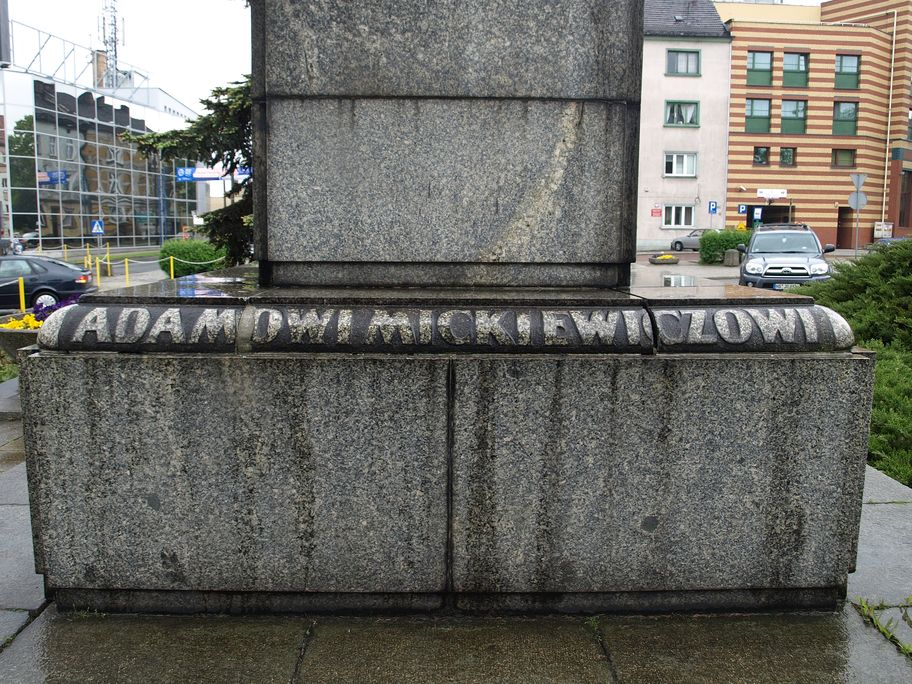
The part of the inscription on the pedestal

== Bibliography ==
- Rudzka, Anna (2009). Józef Gosławski. Rzeźby, monety, medale (in Polish). Warszawa: Alegoria. p. 115. ISBN 978-83-62248-00-1.
- Monuments of Remembrance 1918-2018: Monument to Adam Mickiewicz (Gorzów Wielkopolski).
