= Polanówka, Gmina Wilków =

Polanówka
- Village
- Location within Poland
- Coordinates: 51°16′N 21°57′E
- Country: Poland
- Voivodeship: Lublin
- County: Opole
- Gmina: Wilków

Polanówka [pɔlaˈnufka] is a village in the administrative district of Gmina Wilków, within Opole County, Lublin Voivodeship, in eastern Poland.

Polanówka is the birthplace of Józef Gosławski, a Polish sculptor and medallic artist.
