= Luboń =

Town in Greater Poland Voivodeship, Poland

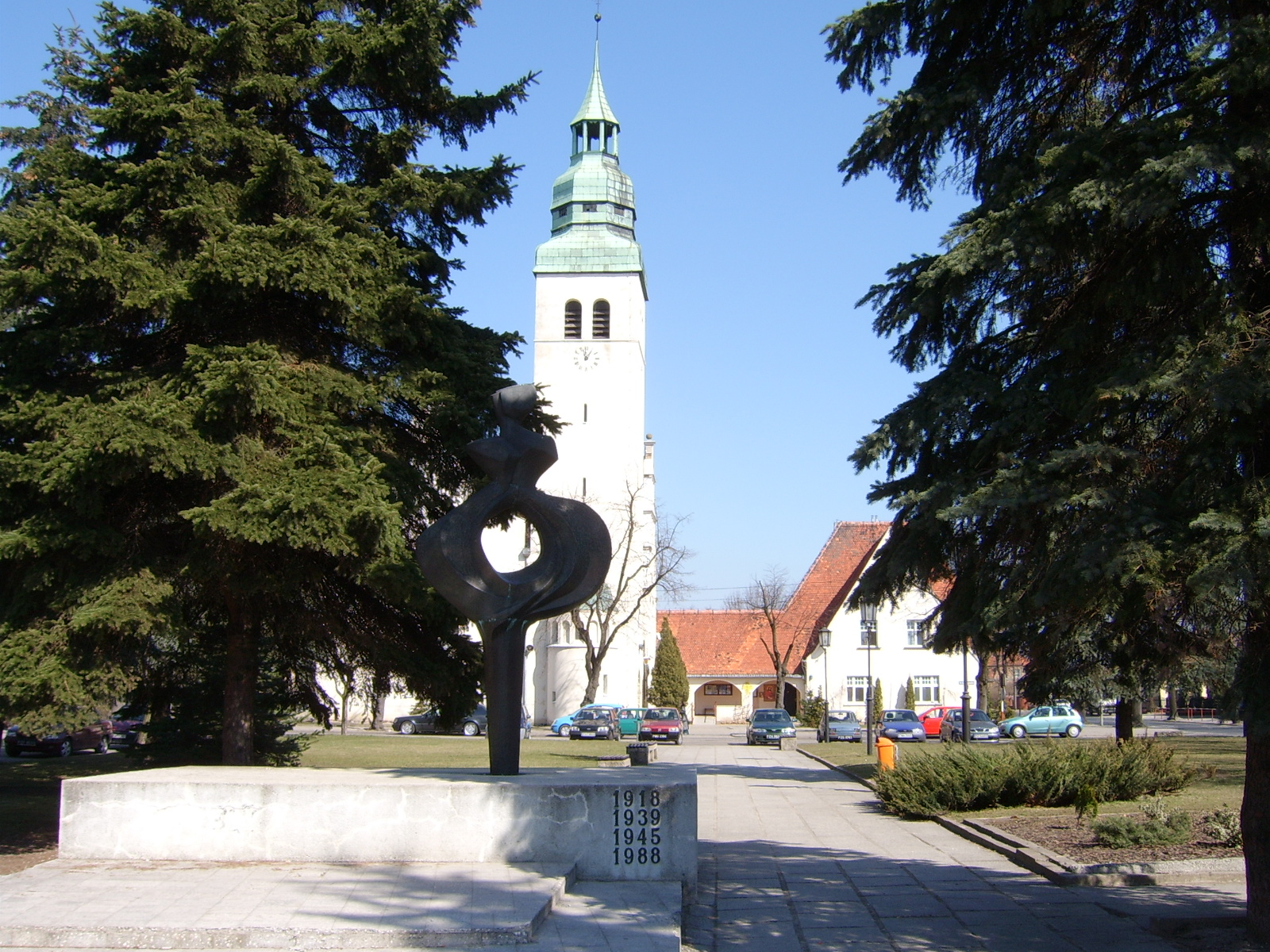
- St. Barbara's church

- Flag Coat of arms

- Location within Poland
- Coordinates: 52°20′00″N 16°53′00″E
- Country: Poland
- Voivodeship: Greater Poland
- County: Poznań
- Gmina: Luboń (urban gmina)
- First mentioned: 1316
- Town rights: 1954

Government
  - Mayor: Małgorzata Machalska

Area
  - Total: 13.52 km^{2} (5.22 sq mi)
- Highest elevation: 83 m (272 ft)
- Lowest elevation: 70 m (230 ft)

Population (2022)
  - Total: 32 848
  - Density: 2.4/km^{2} (6.1/sq mi)
- Time zone: UTC+1 (CET)
  - Summer (DST): UTC+2 (CEST)
- Postal code: 62-030
- Area code: +48 61
- Car plates: POZ, PZ
- Climate: Cfb
- Primary airport: Poznań–Ławica Airport
- Website: www.lubon.pl

Luboń [ˈlubɔɲ] is a town in Poland, situated on the Warta River, in the Poznań metropolitan area, in the Poznań County in the Greater Poland Voivodeship. It has 32,848 inhabitants (2022). The town was created in 1954 by the merger of 3 long established villages; (Old) Luboń, Żabikowo and Lasek.

== History ==
The oldest known mention of Luboń dates back to 1316, while Żabikowo was mentioned in 1283, and Lasek was founded in 1756. All three villages were part of the Greater Poland Province until the 1793 Second Partition of Poland, when they were annexed by Prussia. After the successful Greater Poland uprising of 1806, it was regained by Poles and included within the short-lived Duchy of Warsaw. After the duchy's dissolution in 1815, it was re-annexed by Prussia.

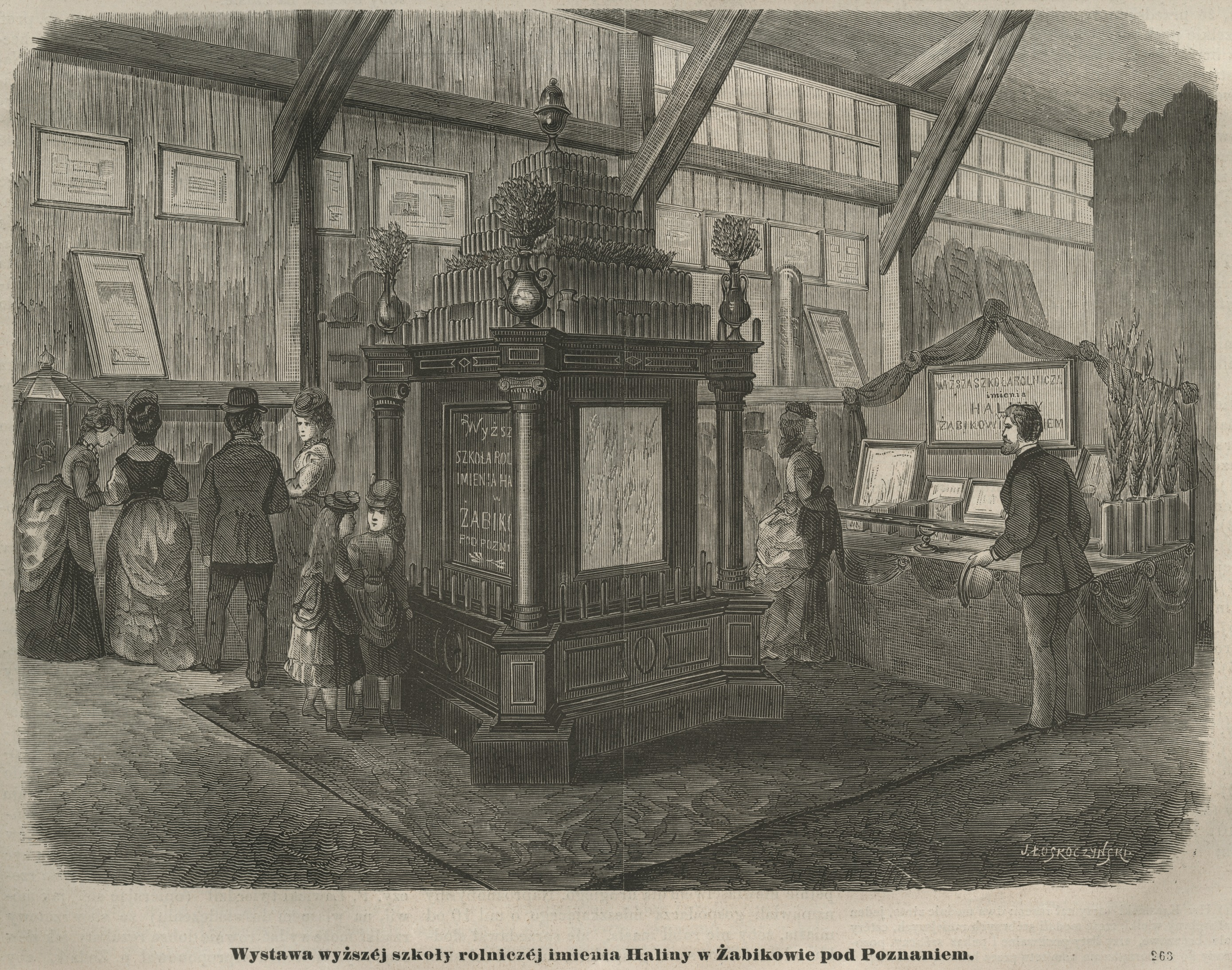
College of Agriculture in Żabikowo in the 1870s

Since 1856 a railway line connecting Poznań with Wrocław ran through present-day Luboń. In 1870, a College of Agriculture (Wyższa Szkoła Rolnicza) was established in Żabikowo, as a Polish college, and was forced to close in 1876 as a result of anti-Polish policies of the German authorities. From 1871 part of Germany, the Germans located new factories in Luboń and initiated German colonization after 1905 in order to change its ethnic composition. After World War I Poland regained independence in 1918 and Luboń was reintegrated with Poland.

During World War II Luboń was occupied by Germany from 1939 to 1945. The Germans established a forced labour camp for Jews in Żabikowo (called Poggenburg by the Nazis) in the north-west of Luboń. In 1943–1945 Żabikowo was also the site of a Nazi prison camp, which replaced the Fort VII camp in western Poznań, and in which over 20,000 people were imprisoned. The prisoners were mainly members of the Polish resistance movement, but also Luxembourgers, Dutch, Hungarians, Slovaks, Americans, Soviet prisoners of war and deserters from the Wehrmacht. Prisoners were subjected to inhuman living conditions, torture and executions. There is now a museum and a monument entitled Nigdy wojny ("Never War") by Józef Gosławski, as well other monuments to various people imprisoned and murdered in the camp. After the end of German occupation, the area was restored to Poland, although with a Soviet-installed communist regime, which stayed in power until the Fall of Communism in the 1980s.

Luboń was granted town rights in 1954 with Żabikowo and Lasek included within its town limits. From 1975 to 1998, it was administratively located in the Poznań Voivodeship. In August 1980, employees of local factories joined the nationwide anti-communist strikes, which led to the foundation of the Solidarity organization, which played a central role in the end of communist rule in Poland.

== Gallery ==
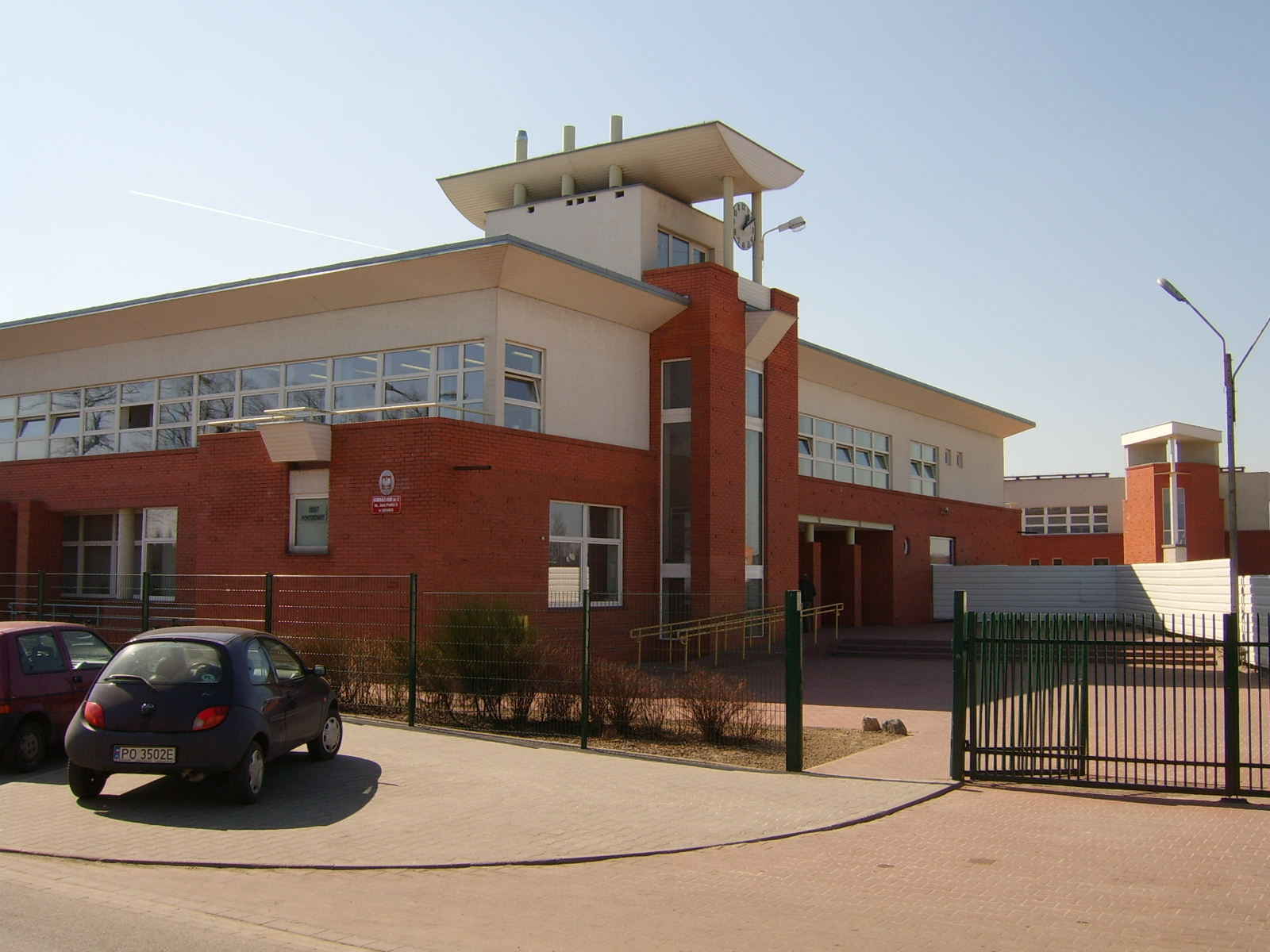
John Paul II Elementary School No.5

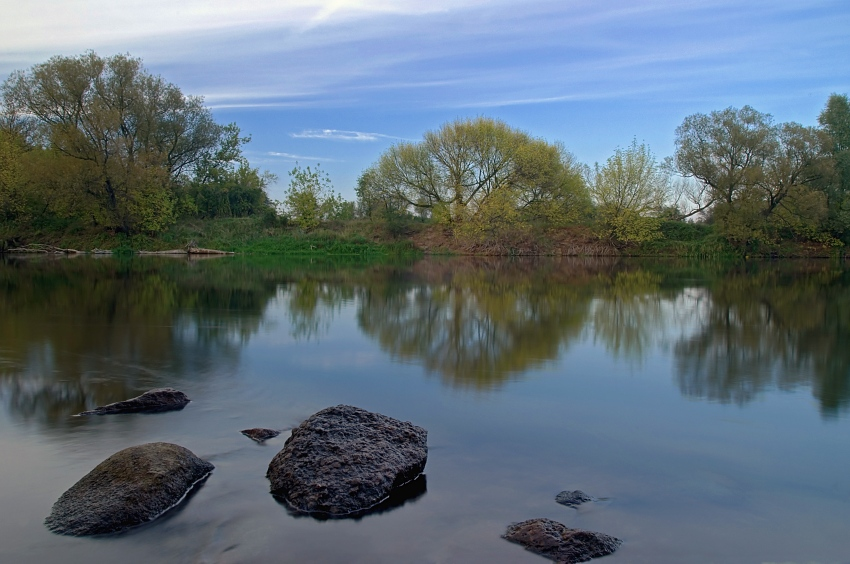
Warta River in Luboń

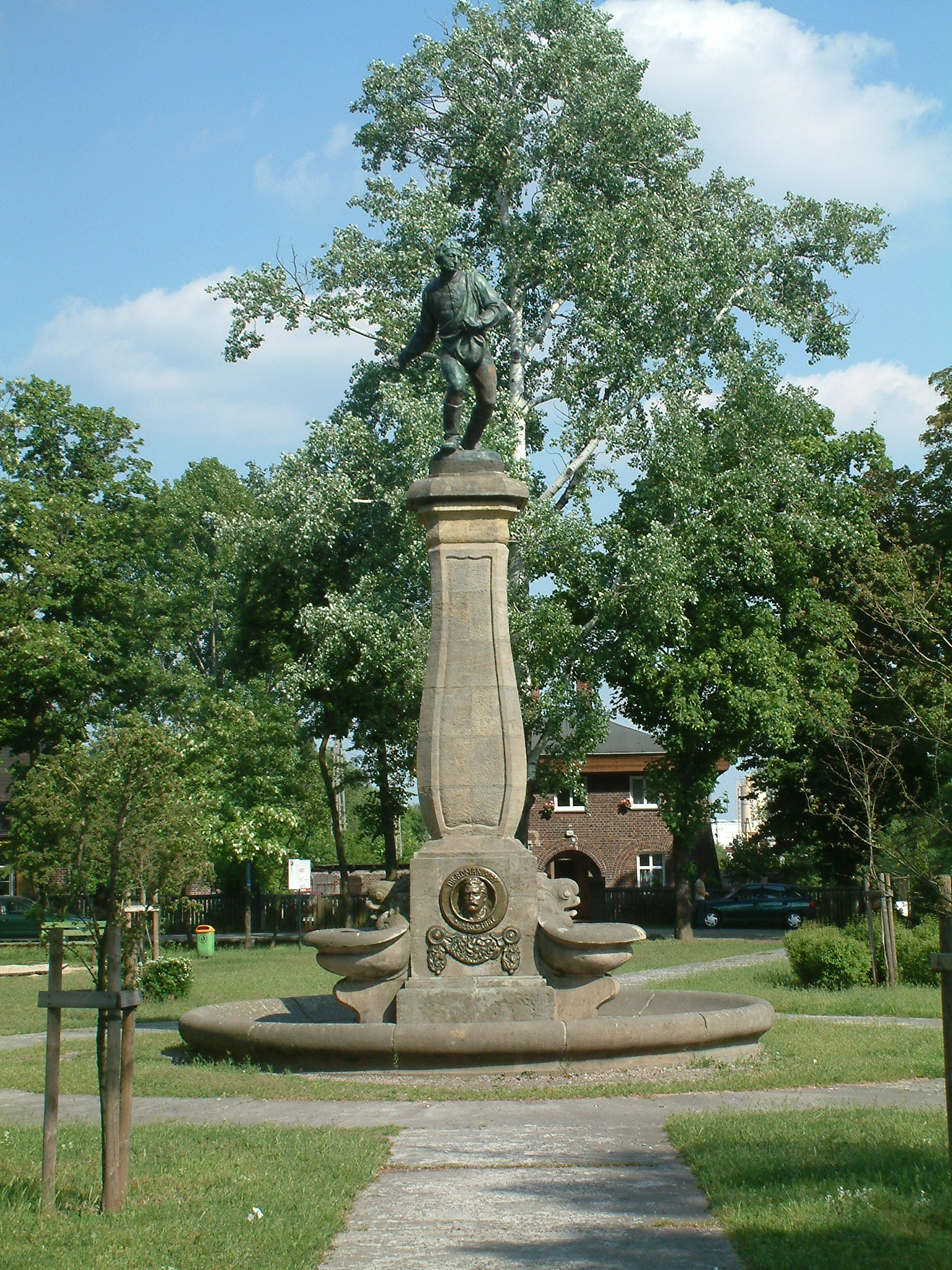
Historic Sower Monument (Pomnik Siewcy), created by Marcin Rożek

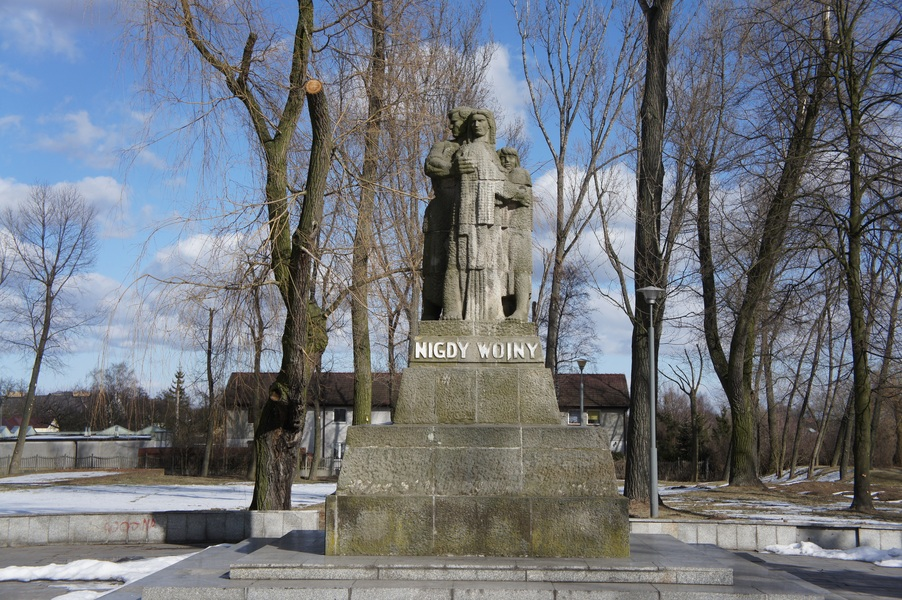
"Never war" monument at the site of the Nazi German prison in Żabikowo

== See also ==
- Bambrzy
- Poznań County
