= Zelazowa Wola (Lyapunov) =

Symphonic poem by Sergei Lyapunov

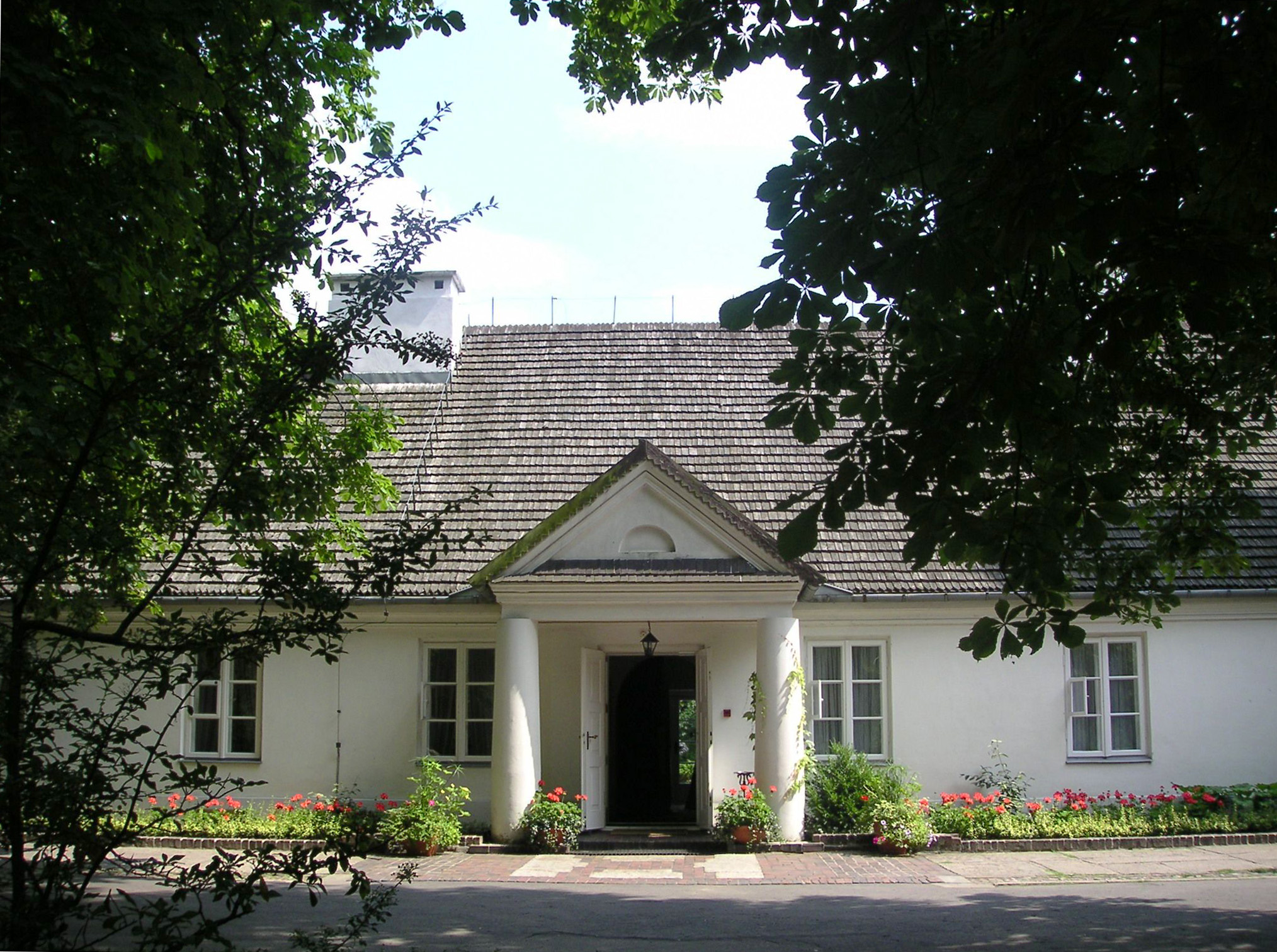
Birthplace of Frédéric Chopin

Zelazowa Wola, Op. 37 is a symphonic poem by Sergei Lyapunov, composed in 1909. It was written for the commemoration of Frédéric Chopin's centenary the following year, its title alluding to the composer's birthplace, a small village in Mazovia, east-central Poland. In a preface to the score Lyapunov explained he intended to revive the "folk and musical atmosphere surrounding the great musician in his childhood, perceiving his native land image in its initial purity and simplicity". In his review for Gramophone of the first Western release of the USSR State Symphony — Svetlanov 1986 recording John Warrack noted the composition's beginning quotes the first measures of Chopin's Mazurka in A minor, Op. 17, No. 4.

== Recordings ==
- Moscow Radio Symphony — Alexander Gauk. Melodiya, 1956.
- USSR State Symphony — Evgeny Svetlanov. Melodiya, 1986.
