= Józef Piłsudski Monument, Turek =

Turek statue in The Żermina Składkowska's Park, Poland

Coordinates: 52°00′48″N 18°29′57″E

Monument of Józef Piłsudski
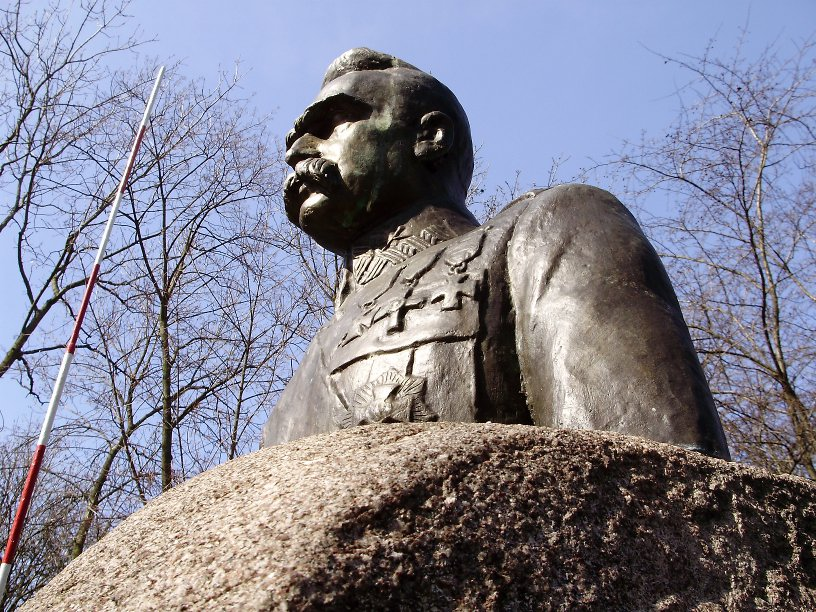
- Artist: Józef Gosławski
- Year: 1936/1990
- Location: Poland, Turek

The Józef Piłsudski monument in Turek is a notable Turek statue, located in The Żermina Składkowska's Park. The monument was designed by Józef Gosławski, during artist's stay in Italy. The monument was designed for the competition organized by Adam Mickiewicz Association in Rome in 1936. The cast of this sculpture was ordered by municipalities of Turek and it is located in the city since 1990.

The monument depicts a bust of Józef Piłsudski in his uniform. The following inscription is located on the pedestal: MARSHAL JÓZEF PIŁSUDSKI 1867-1935 HONORARY CITIZEN OF TUREK CITY (Polish: MARSZAŁEK JÓZEF PIŁSUDSKI 1867-1935 HONOROWY OBYWATEL MIASTA TURKU).

== Gallery ==
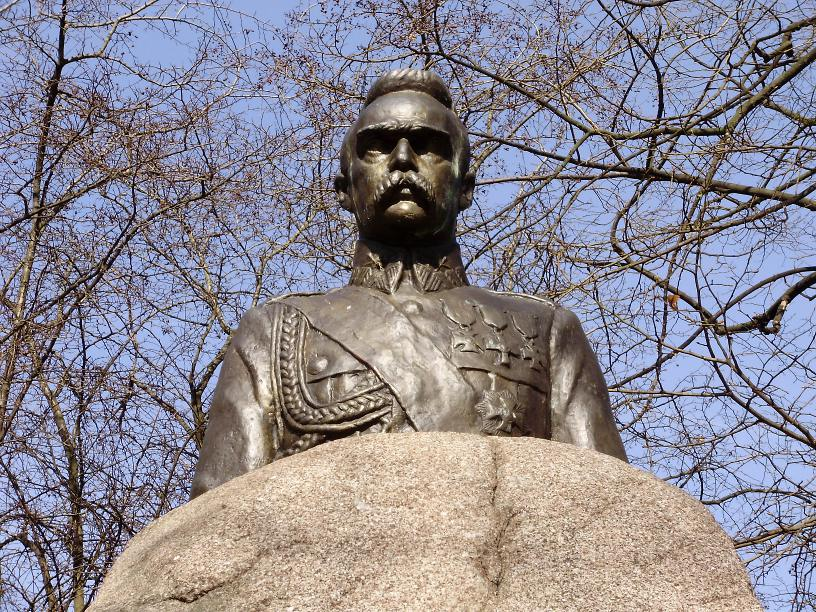
En face

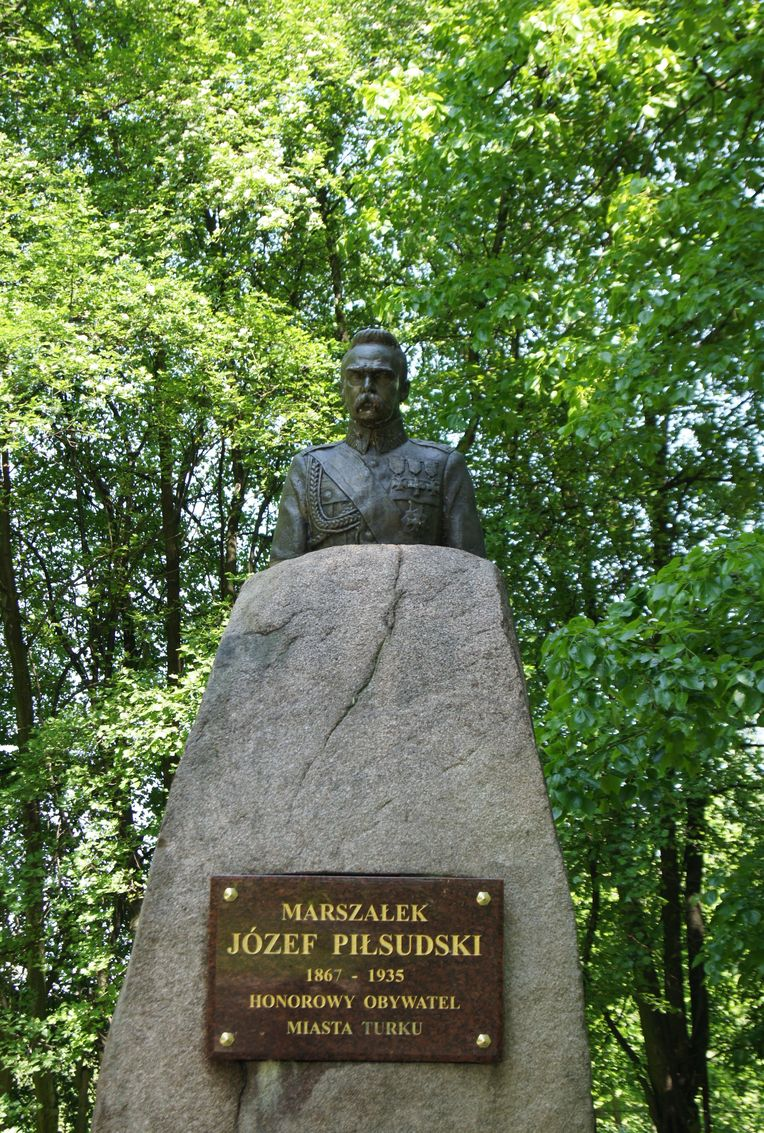
The statue with the inscription

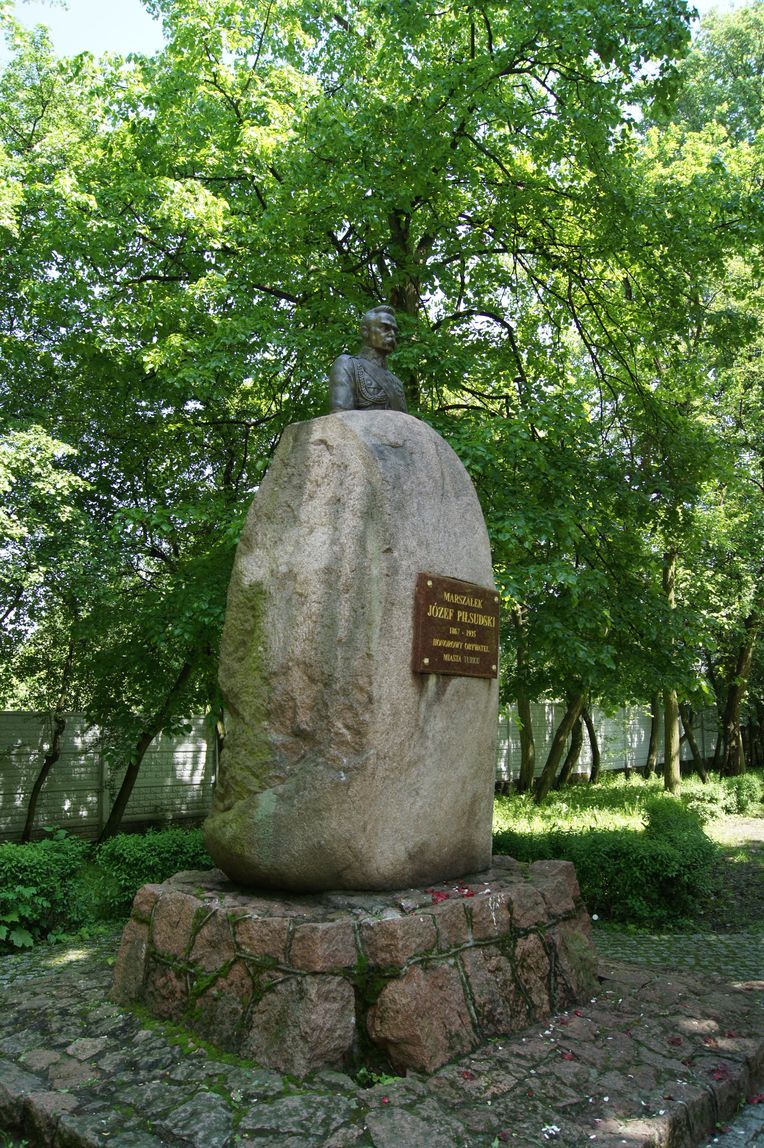
The statue on the pedestal

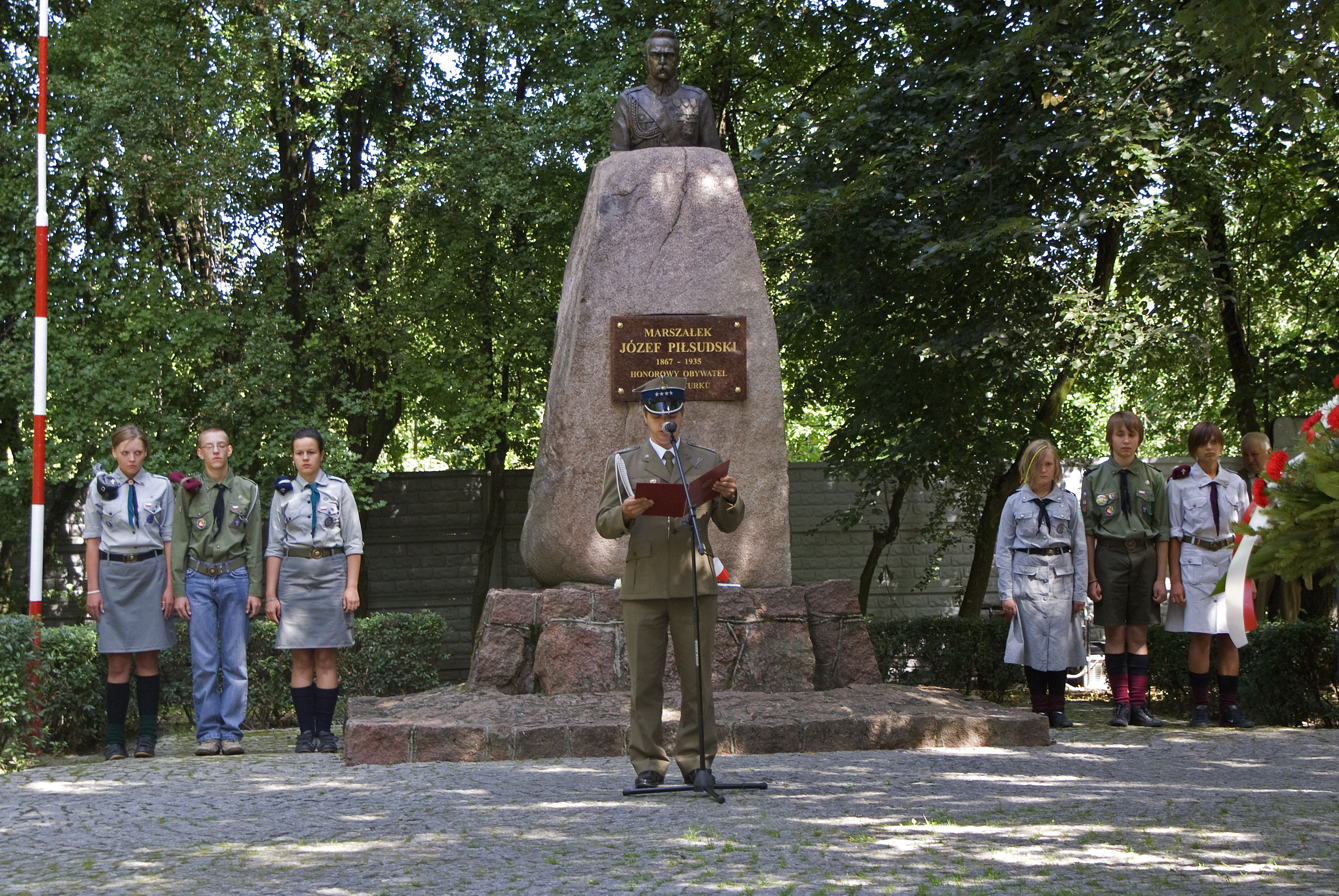
Polish Army's Day celebration (2009)

== Bibliography ==
- Rudzka, Anna (2009). Józef Gosławski. Rzeźby, monety, medale (in Polish). Warszawa: Alegoria. p. 89. ISBN 978-83-62248-00-1.
