= Frédéric Chopin Monument, Żelazowa Wola =

Coordinates: 52°15′18″N 20°18′57″E

Frédéric Chopin monument
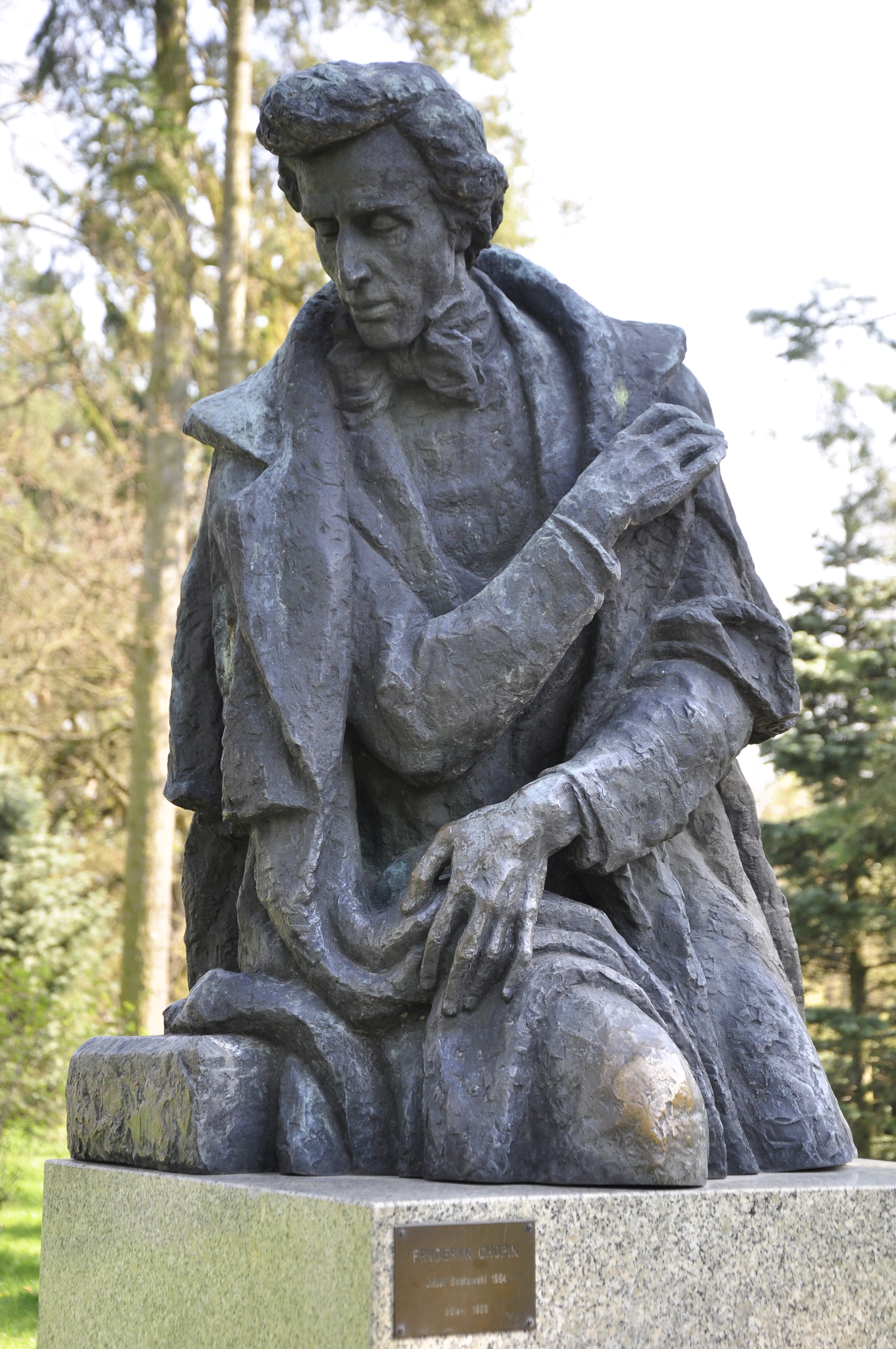
- Artist: Józef Gosławski
- Year: 1955, 1969
- Location: Żelazowa Wola

The Frédéric Chopin monument at Żelazowa Wola is a notable Żelazowa Wola statue, located in a park adjacent to Chopin's birth house.

== History ==
The monument was designed in 1955 by Józef Gosławski, but unveiled on 13 July 1969 by Tadeusz Zaorski, vice-minister of culture and art. The pedestal was designed by Wanda Gosławska. The bronze cast was produced by the Decorative Bronze company (Polish: Brąz Dekoracyjny). A model of the statue has been featured at several International Frédéric Chopin Piano Competitions. The Polish Mint's Famous Medallic Artists medal series includes one bearing an image of the Żelazowa Wola Chopin monument. The medal was produced in 2009 by Hanna Jelonek. The sculpture also inspired Polish painter Piotr Pawiński, who painted a series of pictures.

== Bibliography ==
- Rudzka, Anna (2009). Józef Gosławski. Rzeźby, monety, medale. Warszawa: Alegoria. ISBN 978-83-62248-00-1.
