= Never War =

Statue in Luboń, Poland

Never war
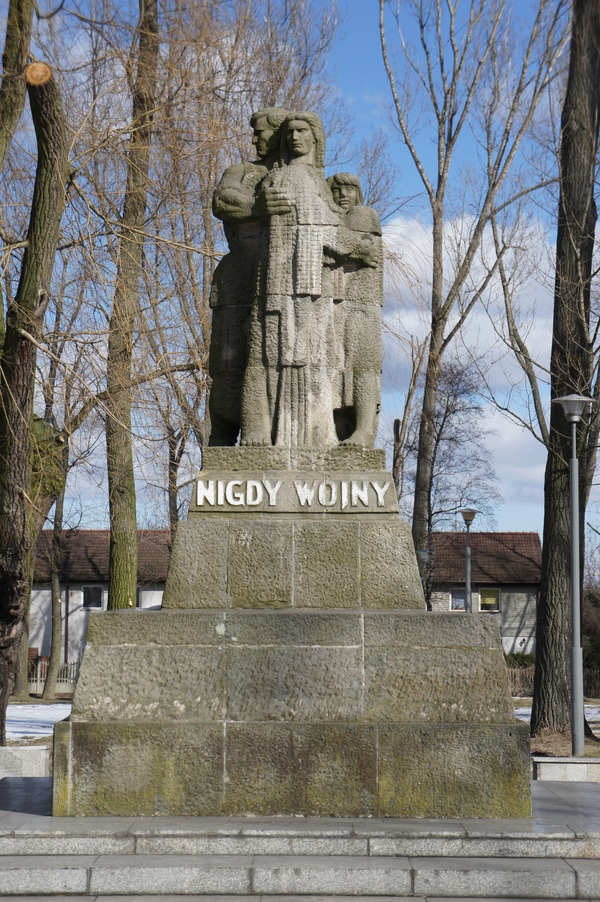
- Artist: Józef Gosławski
- Year: 1952/1956
- Location: Żabikowo, Luboń, Poland

The "Never war" monument is an antiwar statue located in the Żabikowo area of Luboń, Poland, on the site of a former German internment camp known as Poggenburg. The monument was designed and built by Józef Gosławski in 1955, using granite and sandstone. It was unveiled 4 November 1956 by General Zygmunt Berling.

The monument depicts a man embracing a woman and child. On the pedestal is an inscription: NEVER WAR (Polish: NIGDY WOJNY).

== Gallery ==
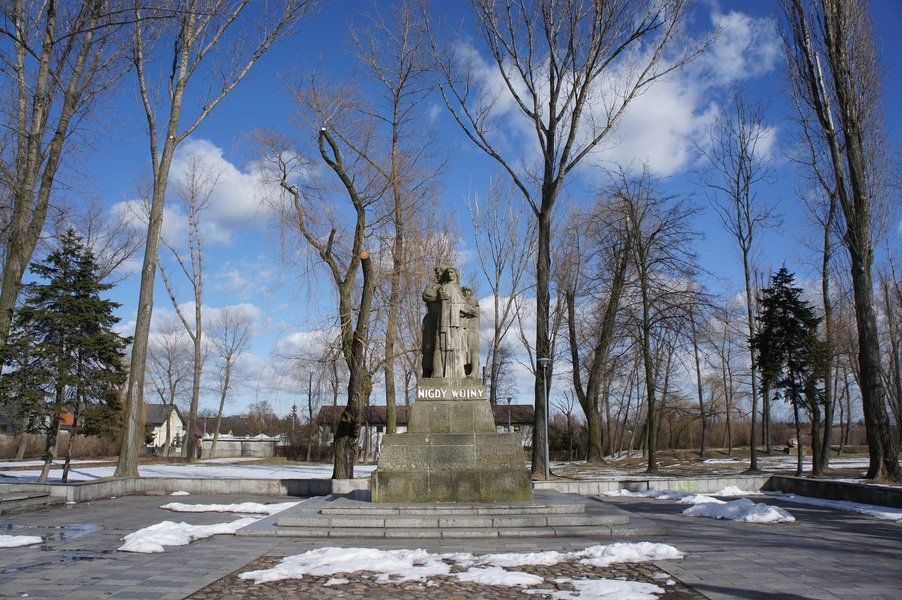

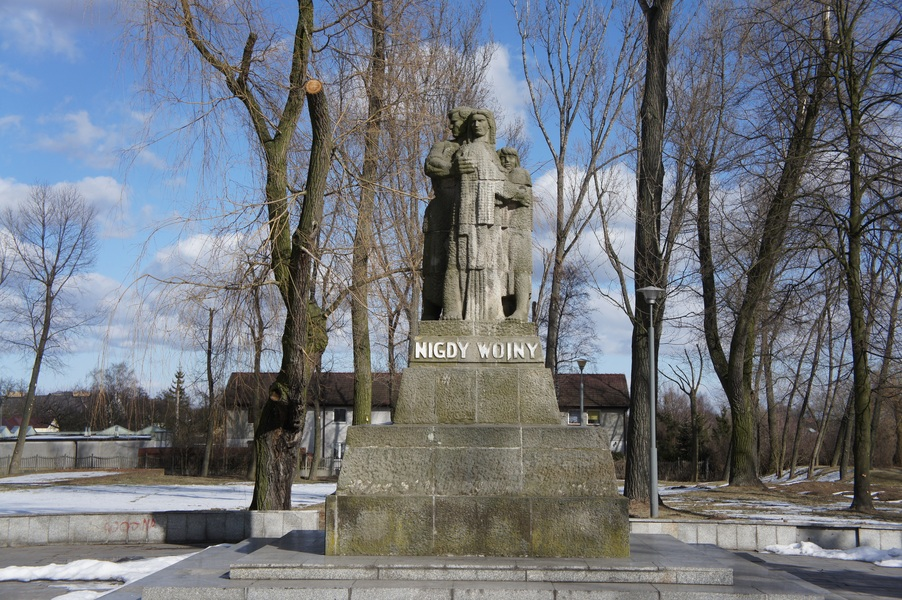

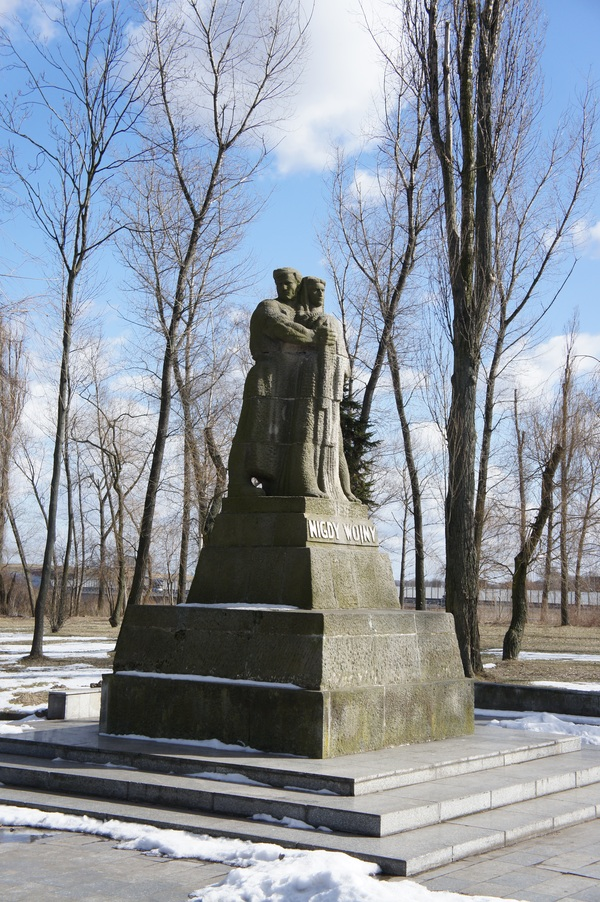

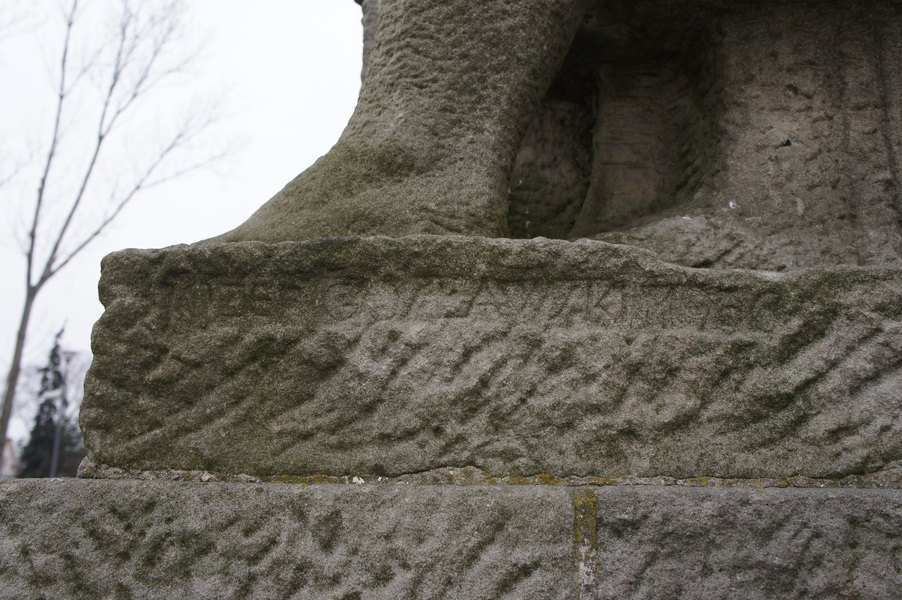
Signature: JÓZEF GOSŁAWSKI 1956

== Bibliography ==
- Rudzka, Anna (2009). Józef Gosławski. Rzeźby, monety, medale (in Polish). Warszawa: Alegoria. pp. 63–64. ISBN 978-83-62248-00-1.
