= Józef Gosławski (sculptor) =

Polish sculptor and medallic artist

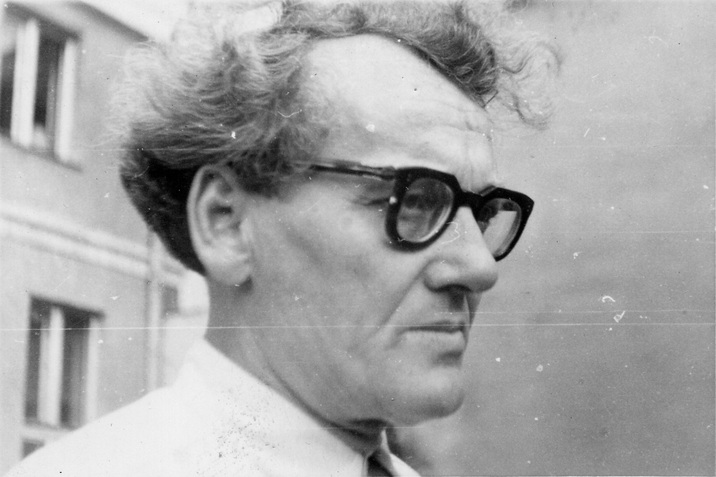
- Born: Józef Jan Gosławski; 24 April 1908; Polanówka, Congress Poland, Russian Empire
- Died: 23 January 1963 (aged 54); Warsaw, Poland
- Notable work: Frédéric Chopin monument in Żelazowa Wola, "Never war" monument, The Music in Warsaw, Adam Mickiewicz monument in Gorzów Wielkopolski, Józef Piłsudski monument in Turek, Medal of the 10th-Anniversary of People's Poland, Medal for Sacrifice and Courage
- Awards: Silver Cross of Merit (1952) 10 Years of People's Poland Commemorative Medal (1955)

Józef Jan Gosławski (24 April 1908 – 23 January 1963) was a Polish sculptor and medallic artist. He was a designer of coins (e.g. 5 zł with fisherman), monuments (e.g. Frédéric Chopin in Żelazowa Wola) and medals (e.g. Year 1939). Laureate of many artistic competitions; decorated with the Silver Cross of Merit.

== Biography ==
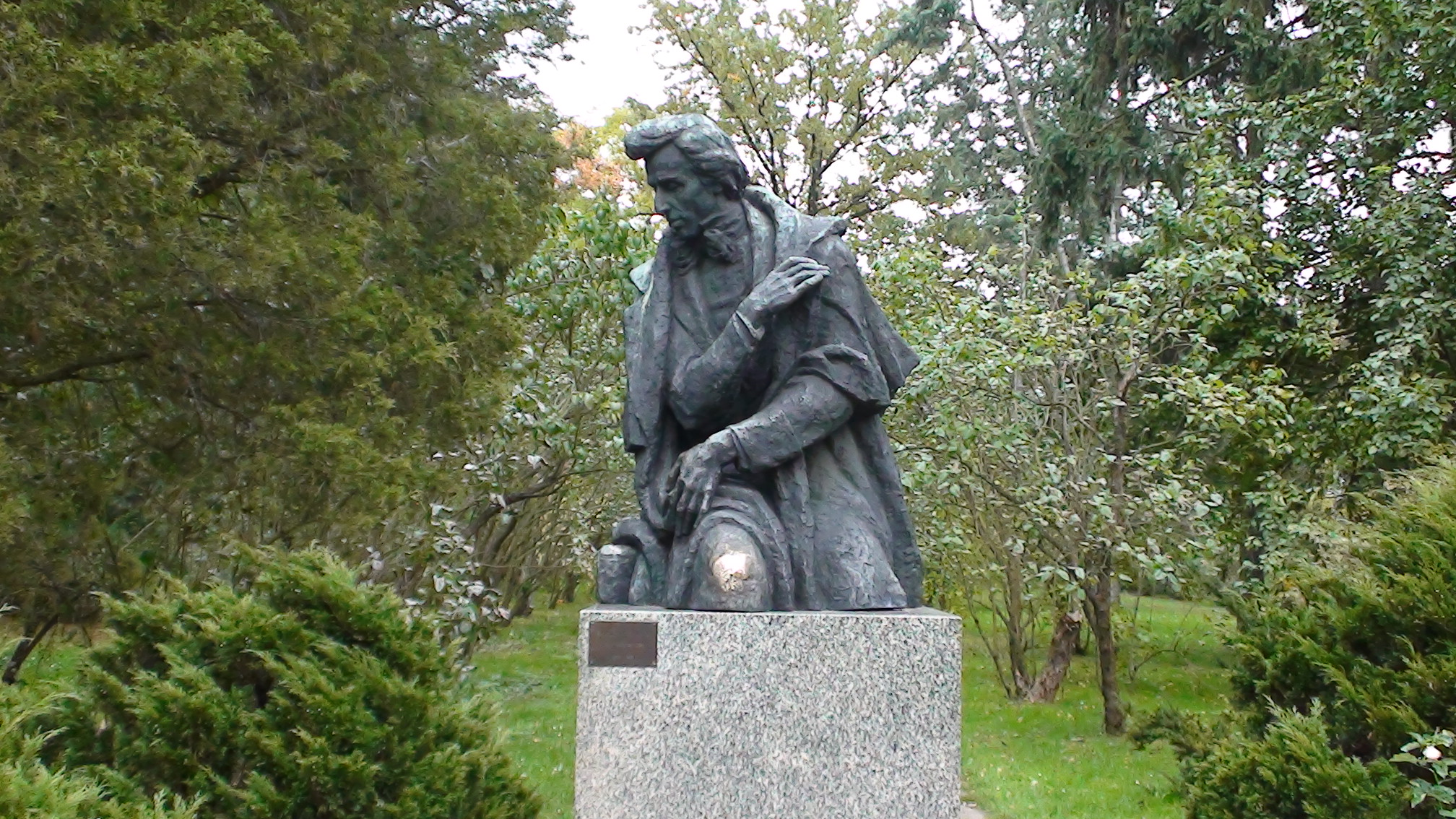
Monument of Frédéric Chopin in Żelazowa Wola (1955/1969)

Józef Gosławski was born in Polanówka, in the Lublin Governorate of Congress Poland, but was brought up Wąwolnica with his parents, two brothers (including younger brother Stanisław Gosławski, who also became a sculptor) and two sisters. He began his artistic education in the Building Crafts School founded by Jan Koszczyc-Witkiewicz in Kazimierz Dolny. After finishing at this school, he passed an exam to the Academy of Fine Arts in Kraków, but he was too young to begin studies. He continued his education in the National Decorative Arts and Artistic Industry School in Kraków. He was influenced by Stanisław Szukalski, but he wasn't a member of the Horned Heart Tribe.

In 1932, he finally began studies at the Academy of Fine Arts in Kraków, where he was taught by professor Xawery Dunikowski. Then he moved to Warsaw, where he was taught by professor Tadeusz Breyer. He was awarded a scholarship to study in Rome, where he graduated from the Royal Academy of Fine Arts in 1937 (he was taught by Angelo Zanelli). During his stay in the Italy, which ended in 1939, he took part in exhibitions of the Kapitol – a society of Polish artists. He also served as the society's vice chairman.

He returned to Poland in July 1939 to become a conservator of the Royal Castle in Warsaw. He did not fill this position due to the beginning of the Second World War. He spent the occupation years in Wąwolnica. After the end of the war, he renovated, among others, a 17th-century house under St. Nicolaus in Kazimierz Dolny.

He held the Medal and Metal Sculpture Chair in the National Artistic School in Poznań from 1947, and was the chairman of Poznań district of the Association of Polish Artists and Designers (ZPAP) for two terms of office. Married to his student Wanda Mankin in 1948, he had two daughters: Bożena Stefania and Maria Anna. He moved with his family to Warsaw in 1956, where he became a chairman of Sculpture Department of ZPAP central board. He died suddenly in Warsaw in 1963 at the beginning of a new artistic phase.

== Art ==
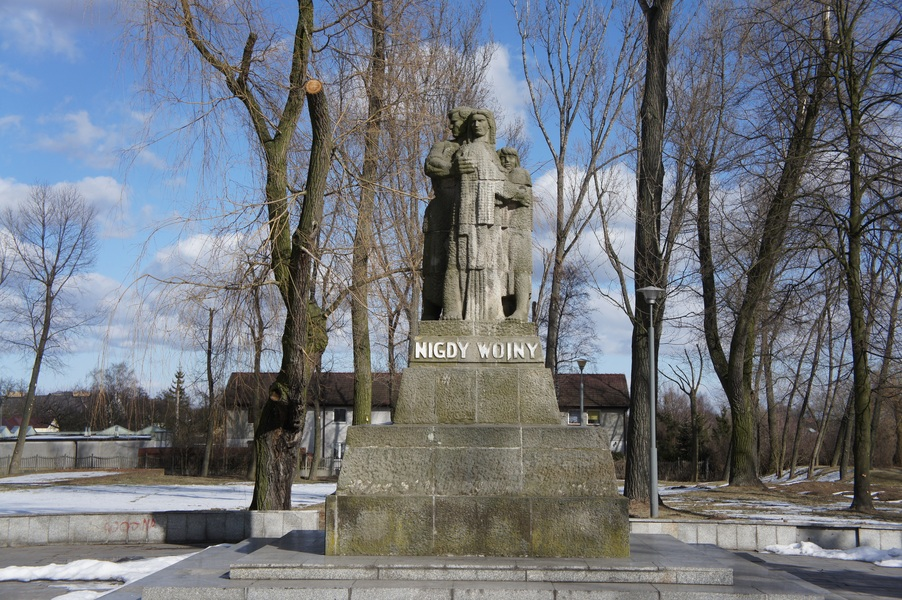
Never war monument in Żabikowo (Luboń, 1956)

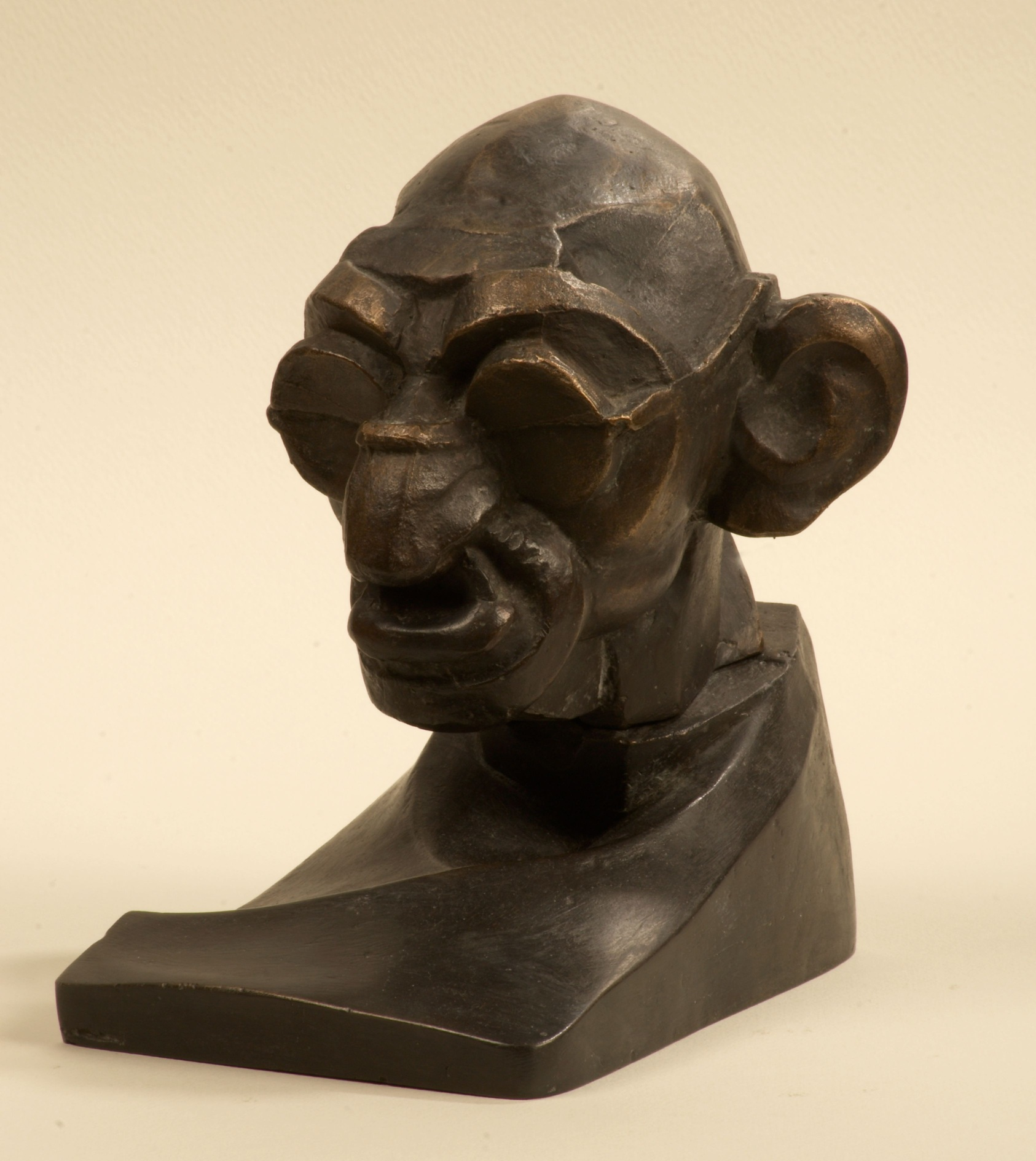
Caricature of Mohandas Karamchand Gandhi (1932)

Józef Gosławski was the creator of numerous monuments and portrait sculptures, sculpture caricatures, medals, coins, renovations and drawings. His early works, generally not conserved, show some influence of cubism (Self-portrait - 1932–1933, Portrait of Witold Chomicz - 1927–1928), Szukalski's ideas (sculpture caricature of Henryk Uziembło), as well as forms similar to ideas of the Polish Applied Art Society (design of the St. Franciscus altar). His stay in Italy and a direct contact with its art changed Gosławski's point of view – the portraits of Robert, Maria Maro, and the Sicilian show a strong influence from his antique studies. This influence, combined with the Italian Renaissance impact, are also seen in the early medals and plaques created in Rome. The before-war works were nearly completely lost during their way back to Poland in August 1939 (there is a relation, whose author says about possibility of staying a part of works in Castello del Catajo).

The years of Second World War were not lost in the terms of artistic activity. War conditions forced him to interest in small sculpture forms. The medals created in those years were mainly related to the martyrdom of the Polish nation.

After the war he continued his work in the field of medals. He was a precursor of the withdrawal from classic form and shape of medals. He became a lonely connection of the Konstanty Laszczka and Józef Aumiller generation with later medallists. His strong position in medallic arts is confirmed with numerous awards and purchases of his works to museums in Poland (e.g. Warsaw, Wrocław, Kraków, Lublin, Toruń) and in Europe (e.g. Prague, Athens, Budapest, Rome, Vatican City, Paris, The Hague, Moscow, Sankt Petersburg).

He returned to the monumental sculpture with the Adam Mickiewicz monument in Gorzów Wielkopolski, the Never war monument in Żabikowo (district of Luboń) near Poznań, a sculpture group called Music in Warsaw (MDM), and the Frédéric Chopin monument in Żelazowa Wola. He participated and won numerous contests for monument design, e.g. Heroes of Warsaw, Soldiers of I Army of People's Army of Poland and Bolesław Prus. He also created a monumental altar of the Transfiguration of Jesus in Masłów near Kielce.

Józef Gosławski's works are difficult to classify. Constant prospecting and an artistic anxiety lead him to create in the different forms and materials. But the main focus of his art was always a human being - as a hero and in everyday life. Gosławski was modest and friendly, even his caricatures, the art type very rare among sculptors, are featured with benignant sense of humour rather than malice.

He was honoured with 14 individual exhibitions, and his works were presented on over 60 domestic (in Poland) and over 20 abroad exhibitions.

=== Participation in artistic competitions ===
Year	Topic of competition	Comments
1936	Bust of Józef Piłsudski	First prize; sculpture created 1938–39, now at National Museum, Warsaw; a cast is at Turek Museum
1946/47	National emblem	Second prize
1951	Sculptures for Constitution Square, Warsaw	Three multi-figure sculptural groups including Music, on building at Koszykowa Street 34/50, Warsaw
1951	GKKF badge	First prize
1951	State Award medal	First prize
1953	Lublin monument to [World War II] partisans	Model stored at unknown site
1953	Lublin triumphal arch	Model stored at unknown site
1953	Medal commemorating 500th anniversary of return of Gdańsk to Poland	In the holdings of Lublin Province Museum; National Museum, Poznań; Museum of Metal Engraving Arts; Royal Castle, Warsaw; Ossolineum; and private collections
1955	Adam Mickiewicz monument, Poznań	Model, in private collections
1957	Monument to victims of Auschwitz concentration camp	Model stored at unknown site
1958	Coins	10 złotych: Mieszko and Dobrawa; first prize. The coin was struck in 1966 as a 100-złotych silver commemorative coin for the millennium of Polish statehood 10 złotych: Nicolaus Copernicus. The coin was placed in circulation in 1959 5 zł - The Waryński Vessel - favouritism 5 zł - The Fisherman - favouritism. The coin was put into circulation in 1958 2 zł - The Cockerels - second prize 2 zł - The Elk - favouritism 2 zł - the reverse of coin with an image of eagle - second prize
1958	The monument of Heroes of Warsaw (I stage)	Unknown place of storing the first model; the second one in collections of Historical Museum of Warsaw
1958	The medal of XV-anniversary of The People's Army of Poland	First, second and third prize
1959	The monument of Heroes of Warsaw (II stage)	First prize (one of six); the model was made in cooperation with Wanda Gosławska and Stanisław Gosławski; nowadays the model in collections of Historical Museum of Warsaw
1959/1960	The monument of First Army	The model was made in cooperation with Wanda Gosławska and Stanisław Gosławski. Unknown place of storing the model
1961	Juliusz Słowacki monument in Warsaw	The first model in collections of Museum of Metal Engraving Arts in Wrocław, the second one in private collections
1962	The monument of murdered Jews in Lublin	The model of monument Flaming ghetto (Polish: Płonące getto) in private collections
1962	Bolesław Prus monument in Warsaw	Two honorable mentions; one of models was made in cooperation with Wanda Gosławska; the first model in private collections, the second one in collections of Museum of Metal Engraving Arts in Wrocław

== List of solo exhibits ==
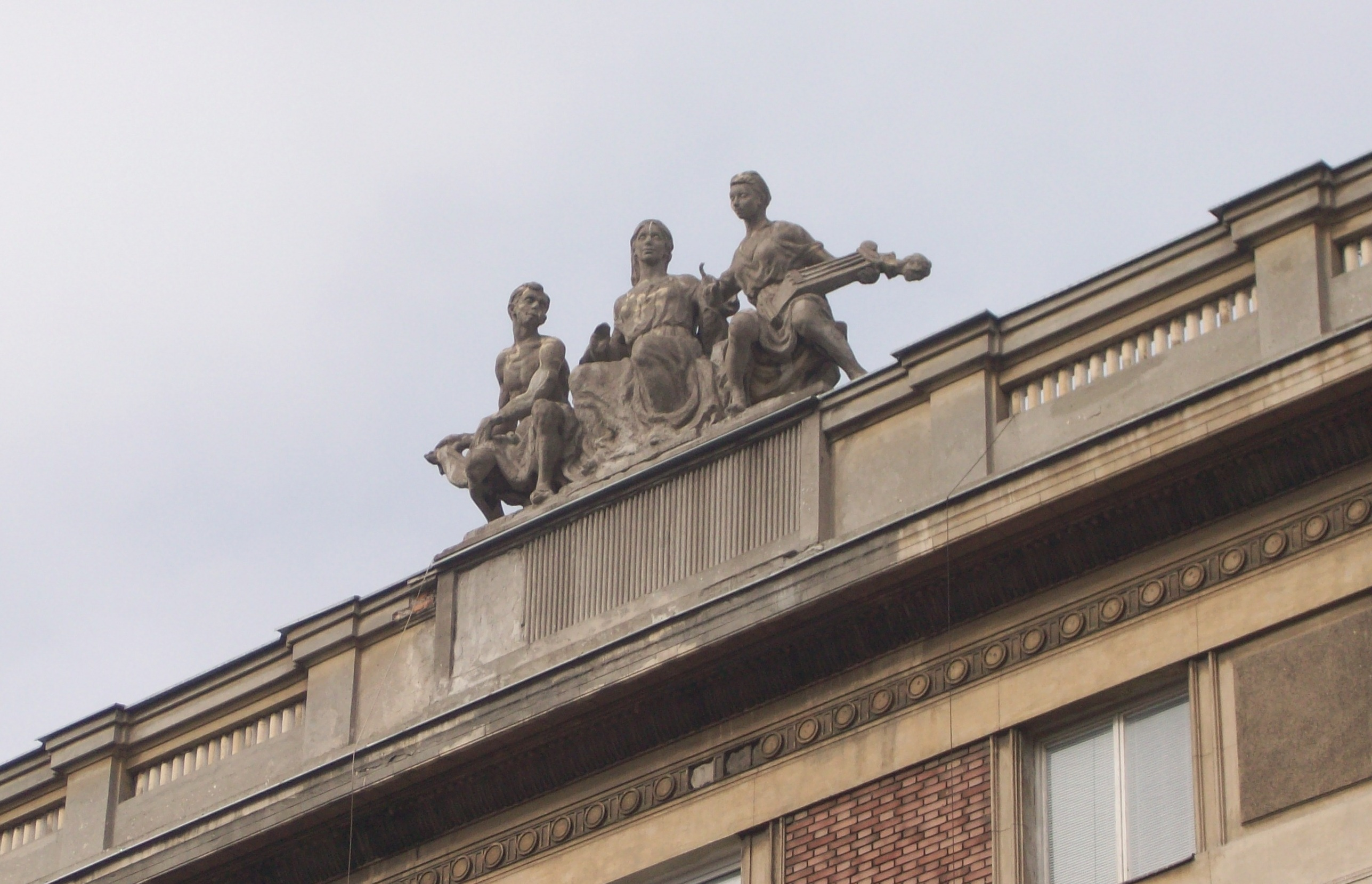
The Music - allegorical sculpture group in Warsaw (1952)

Year	City	Institution	Number of works
1933	Kraków	Palace of Arts	?
1960	Budapest	Ośrodek Kultury Polskiej	30
1963	Warsaw	Dom Wojska Polskiego	49
1968	Wrocław	Townhall	80
1973	Warsaw	Centralne Biuro Wystaw Artystycznych	343
1974	Warsaw	Galeria Wojskowa DWP	34
1974	Warka	Muzeum im. Kazimierza Pułaskiego	56
1974	Bydgoszcz	Regional Museum	18
1987	Lublin	Regional Museum	76
1995	Kazimierz Dolny	Muzeum Nadwiślańskie - Galeria Letnia	80
1996	Bolesławiec	Bolesławiecki Ośrodek Kultury	70
1997	Chełmno	Regional Museum	50
2000	Konin	Regional Museum	84
2003	Warsaw	Galeria Domu Artysty Plastyka	105
2014	Orońsko	Polish Sculpture Center	?
2014/2015	Warsaw	Sculpture Museum in Rabbitery	?

== Selected group exhibits ==
=== Domestic ===
Year	City	Title of exhibition
1946	Lublin	The Festival of Arts (Polish: Festiwal Sztuk)
1947	Kraków	The II Nationwide Winter Salon (Polish: II Ogólnopolski Salon Zimowy)
1949	Warsaw	Artists in the struggle for peace (Polish: Plastycy w walce o pokój)
1950	Warsaw	The I Nationwide Exhibition of Plastic Arts (Polish: I Ogólnopolska Wystawa Plastyki)
1951/1952	Warsaw	The II Nationwide Exhibition of Plastic Arts (Polish: II Ogólnopolska Wystawa Plastyki)
1953	Warsaw	10 years of People's Army of Poland (Polish: 10 lat Ludowego Wojska Polskiego)
1953	Lublin	The Exhibition of models of the triumphal arch for Lublin (Polish: Wystawa projektów Łuku Triumfalnego w Lublinie)
1954	Warsaw	The IV Nationwide exhibition of Plastic Arts (Polish: IV Ogólnopolska Wystawa Plastyki)
1955	Poznań	The Exhibition of Poznań District of Association of Polish Artists and Designers (Polish: Wystawa ZPAP Okręgu Poznańskiego)
1955	Poznań	The Autumn Exhibition of Poznań District of Association of Polish Artists and Designers (Polish: Jesienna wystawa ZPAP Okręgu Poznańskiego)
1958/1959	Warsaw	The Warsaw Sculpture 1945–1958 (Polish: Rzeźba warszawska 1945–1958)
1959	Warsaw	Warsaw in contemporary art (Polish: Warszawa w sztuce współczesnej)
1959	Warsaw	The II Nationwide Exhibition of Maritime Art (Polish: II Ogólnopolska Wystawa Plastyki Marynistycznej)
1960	Warsaw	The Polish Sculpture 1945–1960 (Polish: Rzeźba polska 1945–1960)
1961/1962	Warsaw	Polish Work of Art of 15-anniversary of People's Republic of Poland (Polish: Polskie dzieło plastyczne w XV-lecie PRL)
1962	Lublin	Martyrdom and struggle of Polish Nation 1939–45 (Polish: Martyrologia i walka Narodu Polskiego 1939–45)
1962	Poznań	The Autumn Salon (Polish: Salon Jesienny)
1963	Warsaw	The Nationwide Exhibition of 20-anniversary of People's Army of Poland in Plastic Arts (Polish: Ogólnopolska Wystawa XX-lecia Ludowego Wojska Polskiego w twórczości plastycznej)
1963	Warsaw	The I Nationwide Exhibition of Medallic Art (Polish: I Ogólnopolska Wystawa Medalierstwa)
1963	Warsaw	Warsaw in Art (Polish: Warszawa w Sztuce)
1963	Warsaw	The Exhibition in XVIII anniversary of liberation of Auschwitz (Polish: Wystawa w XVIII rocznicę wyzwolenia Oświęcimia)
1963	Warsaw	The Exhibition of Applied Art in XV-anniversary of People's Republic of Poland (Polish: Wystawa sztuki użytkowej w XV-lecie PRL)
1963	Warsaw	The Exhibition of sculptures and textiles of Warsaw District of Association of Polish Artists and Designers (Polish: Wystawa rzeźb i tkanin Okręgu Warszawskiego ZPAP)
1964	Warsaw	Warsaw in Art (Polish: Warszawa w sztuce)
1964	Warsaw	The Nationwide Exhibition "Textile, ceramic, glass" (Polish: Ogólnopolska Wystawa "Tkanina, ceramika, szkło")
1965	Warsaw	The Exhibition of old master print and sculpture in XX-anniversary of People's Republic of Poland (Polish: Wystawa grafiki i rzeźby w XX-lecie PRL)
1965	Toruń	Decorations, coins and medal of People's Republic of Poland (Polish: Odznaczenia, monety i medale PRL)
1966	Wrocław	Medallic art in People's Poland 1945–1965 (Polish: Sztuka medalierska w Polsce Ludowej 1945–1965)
1969	Warsaw	25-anniversary of medallic art in Poland (Polish: 25 lat sztuki medalierskiej w Polsce)
1969	Wrocław	The Exhibition of ceramic and glass in XXV-anniversary of People's Republic of Poland (Polish: Wystawa ceramiki i szkła w XXV-lecie PRL)
1969/1970	Bydgoszcz	The medals of People's Republic of Poland (Polish: Medale PRL)
1969/1970	Warsaw	25 years of Warsaw sculpture (Polish: 25 lat rzeźby warszawskiej)
1970	Poznań	The war and peace in plastic art (Polish: Wojna i pokój w twórczości plastycznej)
1971	Wrocław	Monuments and monumental sculpture in People's Republic of Poland (Polish: Rzeźba pomnikowa i monumentalna w PRL)
1971	Toruń	Nicolaus Copernicus's topic in medallic art and numismatics (Polish: Tematyka kopernikowska w medalierstwie i numizmatyce)
1971	Bydgoszcz	Polish cities in the medals (Polish: Miasta polskie w medalach)
1972	Wrocław	Polish medical medals and badges (Polish: Polskie medale i odznaki medyczne)
1972	Bydgoszcz	The women in the medallic art (Polish: Kobieta w twórczości medalierskiej)
1972	Bydgoszcz	Famous Poles on the medals (Polish: Sławni Polacy na medalach)
1974	Lublin	Review of Polish sculpture 1944–74 (Polish: Przegląd rzeźby polskiej 1944–1974)
1974	Radom	Contemporary portrait sculpture (Polish: Współczesna rzeźba portretowa)
1974	Bydgoszcz	The sports medals (Polish: Medale sportowe)
1974	Bydgoszcz	The medals of Polish museums (Polish: Medale muzeów polskich)
1974	Bydgoszcz	Polish cities in the medals (Polish: Miasta polskie w medalach)
1977	Bydgoszcz	Coins of People's Republic of Poland (Polish: Monety PRL)
1977	Bydgoszcz	The people of theatre in medallic art (Polish: Ludzie teatru w medalierstwie)
1977	Częstochowa	The exhibition of Polish postwar coins (Polish: Wystawa polskich monet powojennych)
1979	Wrocław	Contemporary Polish medallic art 1944–1979 (Polish: Współczesne medalierstwo polskie 1944–1979)
1979/1980	Bydgoszcz	The Polish writers on the medals (Polish: Pisarze polscy na medalach)
1980	Bydgoszcz	Traditions of the Polish army (Polish: Tradycje wojska polskiego)
1980	Bydgoszcz	The women in the medallic art (Polish: Kobieta w twórczości medalierskiej)
1980	Warsaw	The Polish science in the medals (Polish: Nauka polska w medalach)
1985/1986	Bydgoszcz	Money of People's Poland 1944–1983 (Polish: Pieniądz Polski Ludowej 1944–1983)
1986	Lublin	Lublin plastic art (Polish: Plastyka lubelska)
1986	Ostrołęka	Commemorative medals of Polish museums (Polish: Medale pamiątkowe Muzeów polskich)
1987	Bydgoszcz	The women on the medal (Polish: Kobieta na medalu)
1988	Tuchola	The jubilee medals of Polish cities (Polish: Medale jubileuszowe miast polskich)
1990	Bydgoszcz	Frédéric Chopin and the people of his epoch (Polish: Fryderyk Chopin i ludzie jego epoki)
1996	Bydgoszcz	Remarkable Poles on the medals (Polish: Wybitni Polacy na medalach)
1997	Warsaw	Tadeusz Breyer and his students (Polish: Tadeusz Breyer i jego uczniowie)
1997	Wrocław	The Polish sculpture (Polish: Rzeźba polska)
1998/1999	Warsaw	The time tunnel. Warsaw sculpture of the end of the century (Polish: Tunel czasu. Warszawska rzeźba końca wieku)
2002	Warsaw	Polish science in medallic art (Polish: Nauka polska w medalierstwie)
2007/2008	Bydgoszcz	Pharmacy and medicine in medallic art (Polish: Farmacja i medycyna w medalierstwie)
2008	Warsaw	The present absent (Polish: Obecni nieobecni)
2009	Toruń	Nicolaus Copernicus in medallic art (Polish: Mikołaj Kopernik w medalierstwie)
2009	Bydgoszcz	Polish museums in medallic art. From collections of the Leon Wyczółkowski District Museum in Bydgoszcz (Polish: Muzea polskie w medalierstwie ze zbiorów MOB)
2010	Wrocław	Polish: Impresje Chopinowskie
2010/2011	Warsaw	Polish: Wojsko Polskie w medalierstwie Józefa Gosławskiego i w kolekcji medali Centralnej Biblioteki Wojskowej
2011	Warsaw	Polish: Polska Szkoła Mistrzów
2011	Warsaw	Polish: Rzeźbiarze Saskiej Kępy wczoraj i dziś
2012	Warsaw	Polish: Sztuka wszędzie. Akademia Sztuk Pięknych w Warszawie 1904–1944

=== External ===
Year	State	City	Title of exhibition	Institution
1932	Austria	Vienna	The International Exhibition of Caricatures (Polish: Międzynarodowa Wystawa Karykatury)	Vienna Künstlerhaus
1936	Italy	Rome	The Exhibition of Association of Artists - "The Capitol" (Polish: Wystawa Koła Artystów Polskich "Kapitol")	?
1936	Italy	Rome	The Exhibition of Association of Artists - "The Capitol" (Polish: Wystawa Koła Artystów Polskich "Kapitol")	?
1950	Czechoslovakia	Prague	The World Exhibition of Medallic Art (Polish: Światowa Wystawa Medalierstwa)	?
1950	Italy	Rome	The exhibition of sacred art (Polish: Wystawa sztuki sakralnej)	?
1959	Italy	Catania	Circolo Artistico	?
1959	Austria	Vienna	The International Exhibition of Contemporary Medals (Polish: Międzynarodowa Wystawa Medali Współczesnych)	?
1963/1964	Soviet Union	Moscow-Minsk	The International at the 20. anniversary of The Great Patriotic War (Polish: Wystawa w 20. rocznicę Wielkiej Wojny Ojczyźnianej)	?
1964	Italy	Arezzo	The International Competition of Medallic Art (Polish: Międzynarodowy Konkurs Medalierstwa)	?
1965	East Germany	Berlin-Erfurt-Leipzig	The soldiers of the nation - the Polish army in the art (Polish: Żołnierze narodu - polska armia w sztuce)	?
1966	Czechoslovakia	Kralupe	The international exhibition of medals (Polish: Międzynarodowa wystawa medali)	?
1966	Bulgaria	Sofia	The exhibition of Polish medallic art (Polish: Wystawa medalierstwa polskiego)	?
1966/1967	Hungary	Travelling exhibition	The Polish army in the service of people's defense (Polish: Wojsko polskie w służbie ludowej obronności)	?
1967	Yugoslavia	Travelling exhibition	The Polish army in the service of people's defense (Polish: Wojsko polskie w służbie ludowej obronności)	?
1967	Finland Sweden Poland	Travelling exhibition	?	?
1967	France	Paris	The XXVII Salon of The Sacred Art (Polish: XXVII Salon Sztuki Sakralnej)	?
1968	Soviet Union	Moscow	The social-revolutionary topics in Polish fine arts (Polish: Tematyka społeczno-rewolucyjna w polskiej sztuce plastycznej)	?
1969	Hungary	Budapest	International Military Exhibition of Fine Arts (Polish: Międzynarodowa Wojskowa Wystawa Plastyki)	?
1971	France	Paris	The 50 years of the medallic art in Poland (Polish: 50 lat sztuki medalierskiej w Polsce)	?
1971	Netherlands	The Hague	The exhibition of Polish medals (Polish: Wystawa medali polskich)	?
1972	East Germany	Berlin	The war and peace in the arts of People's Republic of Poland (Polish: Wojna i pokój w sztukach plastycznych PRL)	?
1985	Czechoslovakia	Prague	The Polish contemporary medallic art (Polish: Polskie medalierstwo współczesne)	?
2003	Austria	Vienna	The New State. Polish Art between Experiment and Representation 1918–1939 (Polish: Nowe Państwo. Polska sztuka między eksperymentem a reprezentacją 1918–1939, German: Der neue Staat. Polnische Kunst zwischen Experiment und Repräsentation von 1918 bis 1939)	Leopold Museum

== Inspirations ==
The memory of Józef Gosławski and his works, especially medals, is remembered not only on the occasion of exhibitions. In December 2008 Polish Mint emitted local currency of Lidzbark Warmiński. It was a ducat Four men (Polish: Czterech mężów) whose observe based on Gosławski's medal Lidzbark Warmiński - The City of Great Men (Polish: Lidzbark Warmiński - miasto mężów znakomitych). In 2009 The Polish Mint produced a medal series Famous Medallists dedicated to Józef Gosławski. In this set there was, among others, the medal based on project made during Second World war, entitled Year 1939 - it was the first public presentation of it. The second medal (by Hanna Jelonek) presented an image of the artist (obverse) and Chopin's monument by Gosławski (reverse). In 2009 there was also an emission of silver and gold replica of 5 zł with fisherman coin, which was designed to the competition in 1958. Moreover, there is the one street dedicated to Józef Gosławski - it is located in Wąwolnica - the village where the artists lived and created many works for years.

== Gallery ==
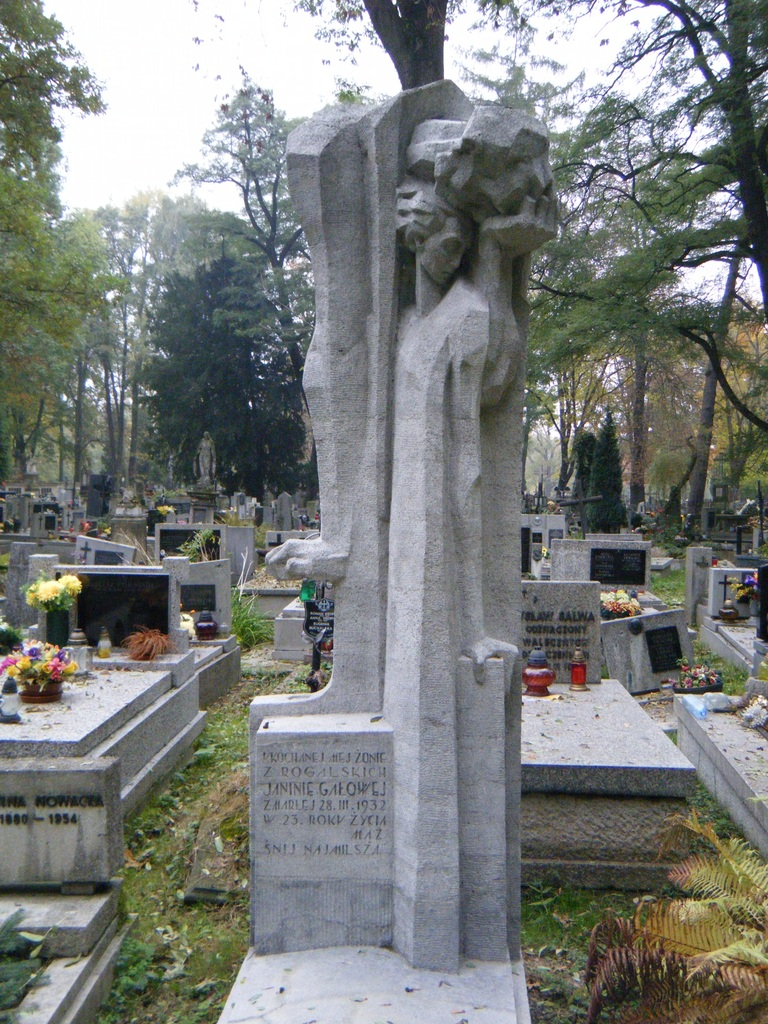
Monument on the tombstone of Janina Gałowa, Rakowicki Cemetery in Cracow (1932)

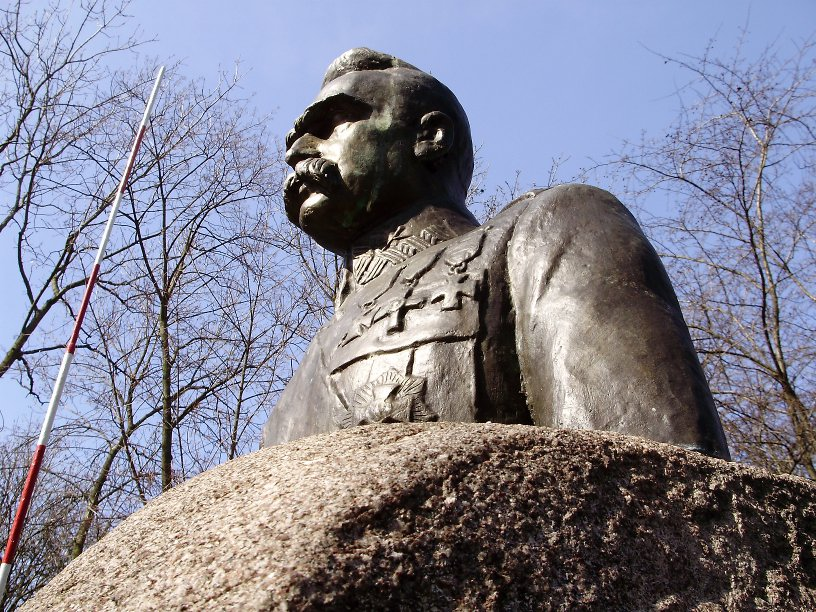
Monument of Marshal Józef Piłsudski in Turek (project from 1936)

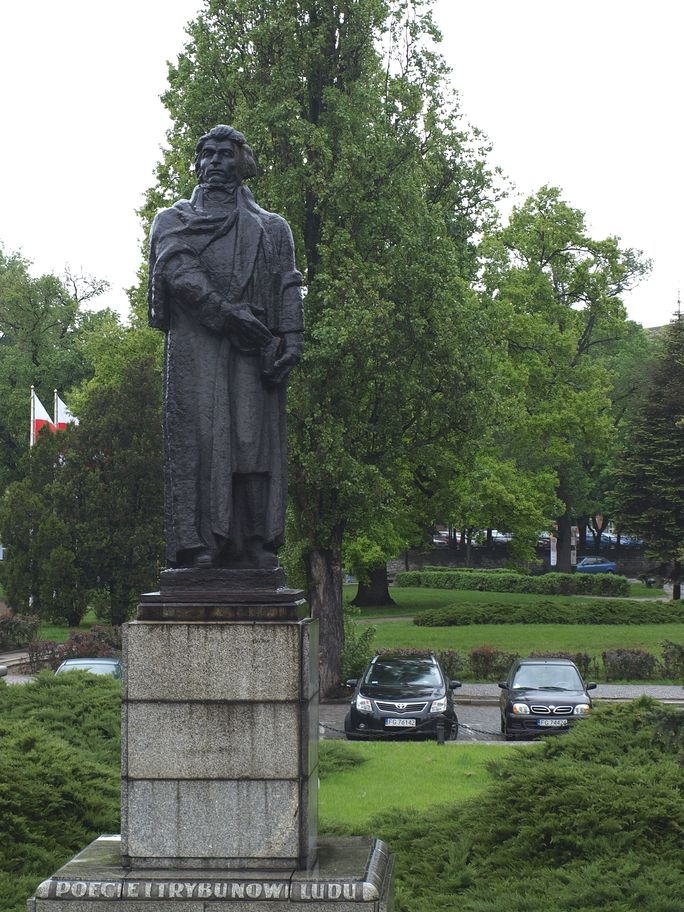
Monument of Adam Mickiewicz in Gorzów Wielkopolski (1956)

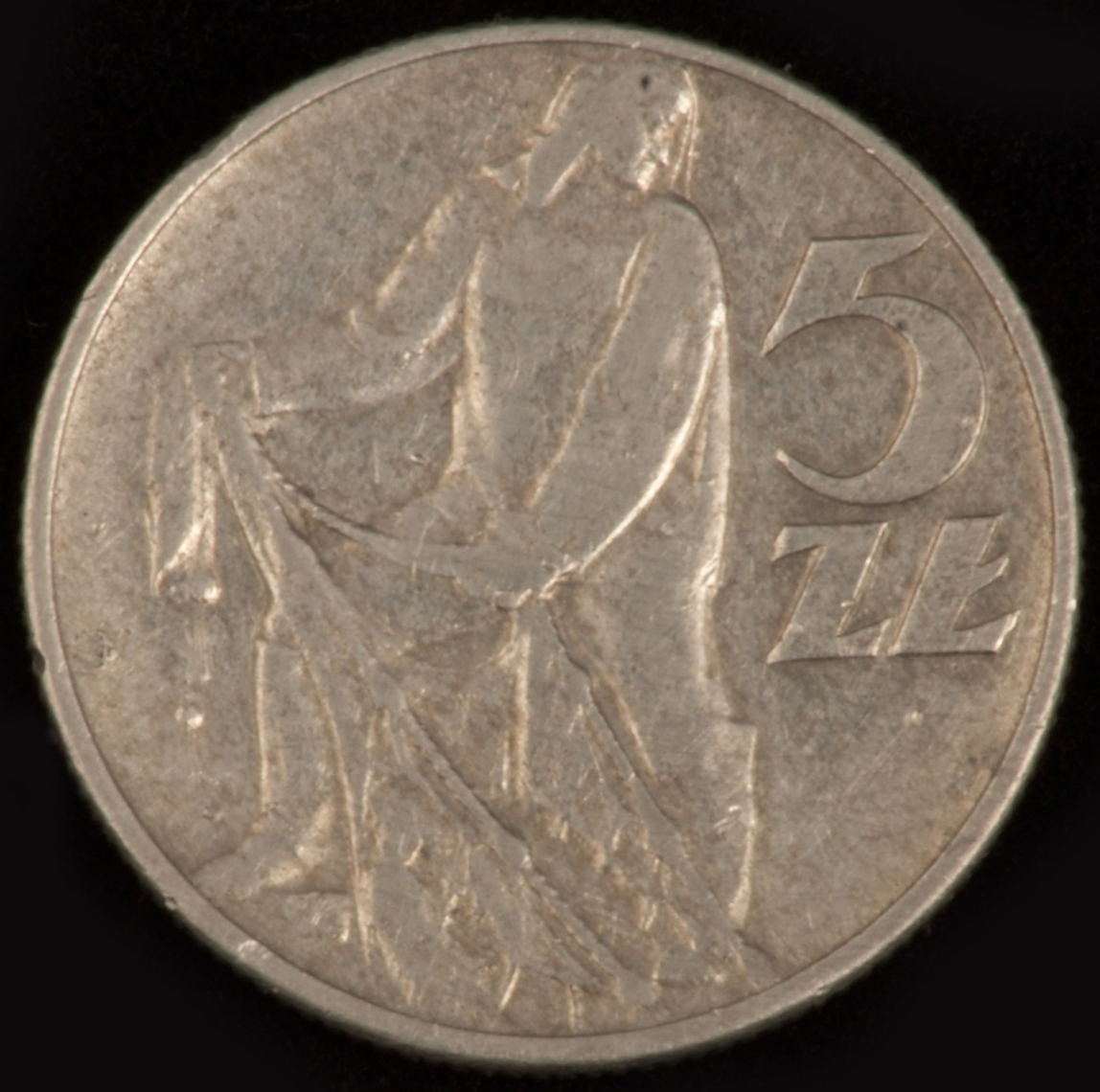
Reverse of the former Polish coin (5 złotych, 1973) with the image of a fisherman (designed in 1958)

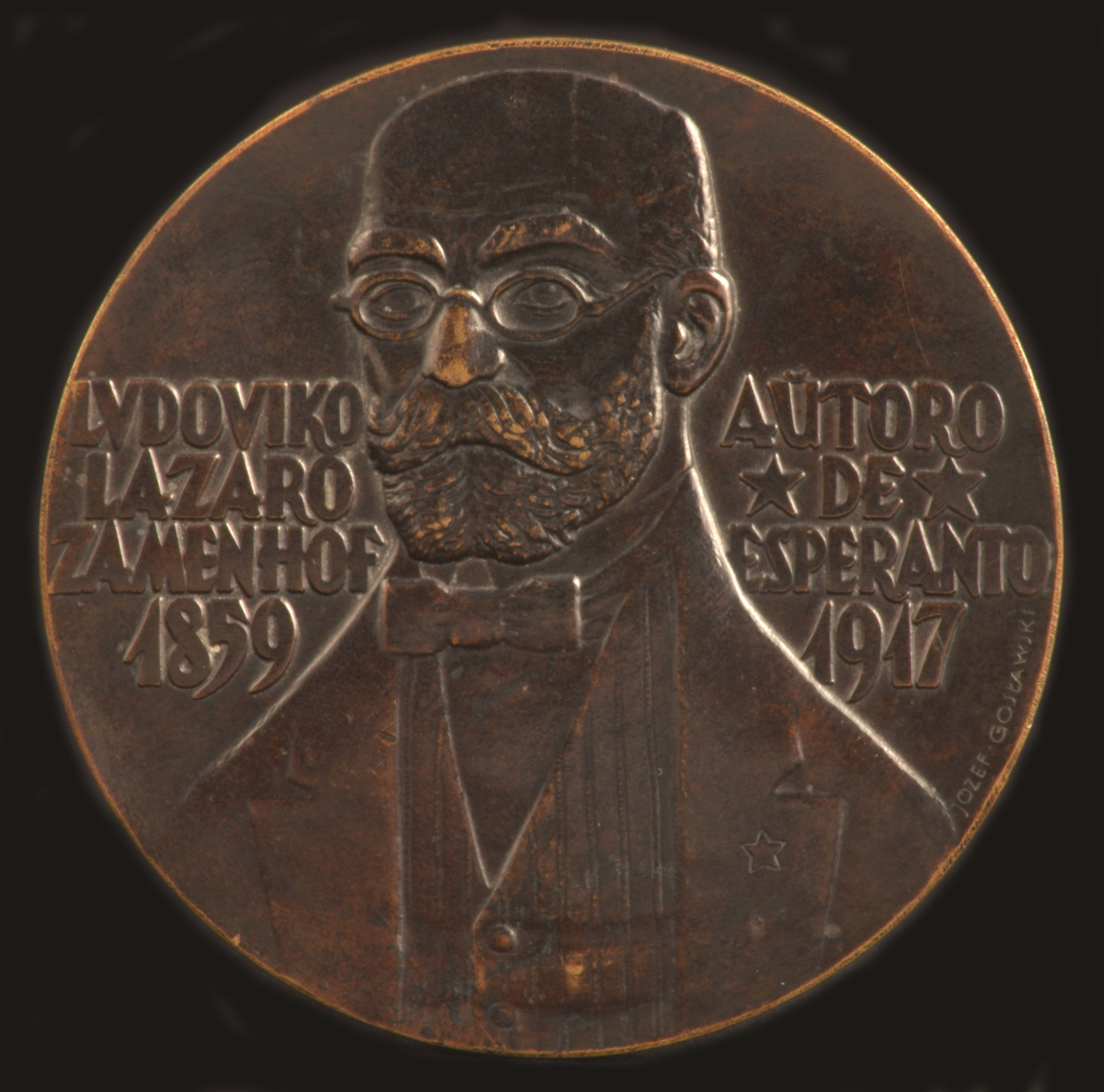
Obverse of medal with Ludovic Lazarus Zamenhof (1959)

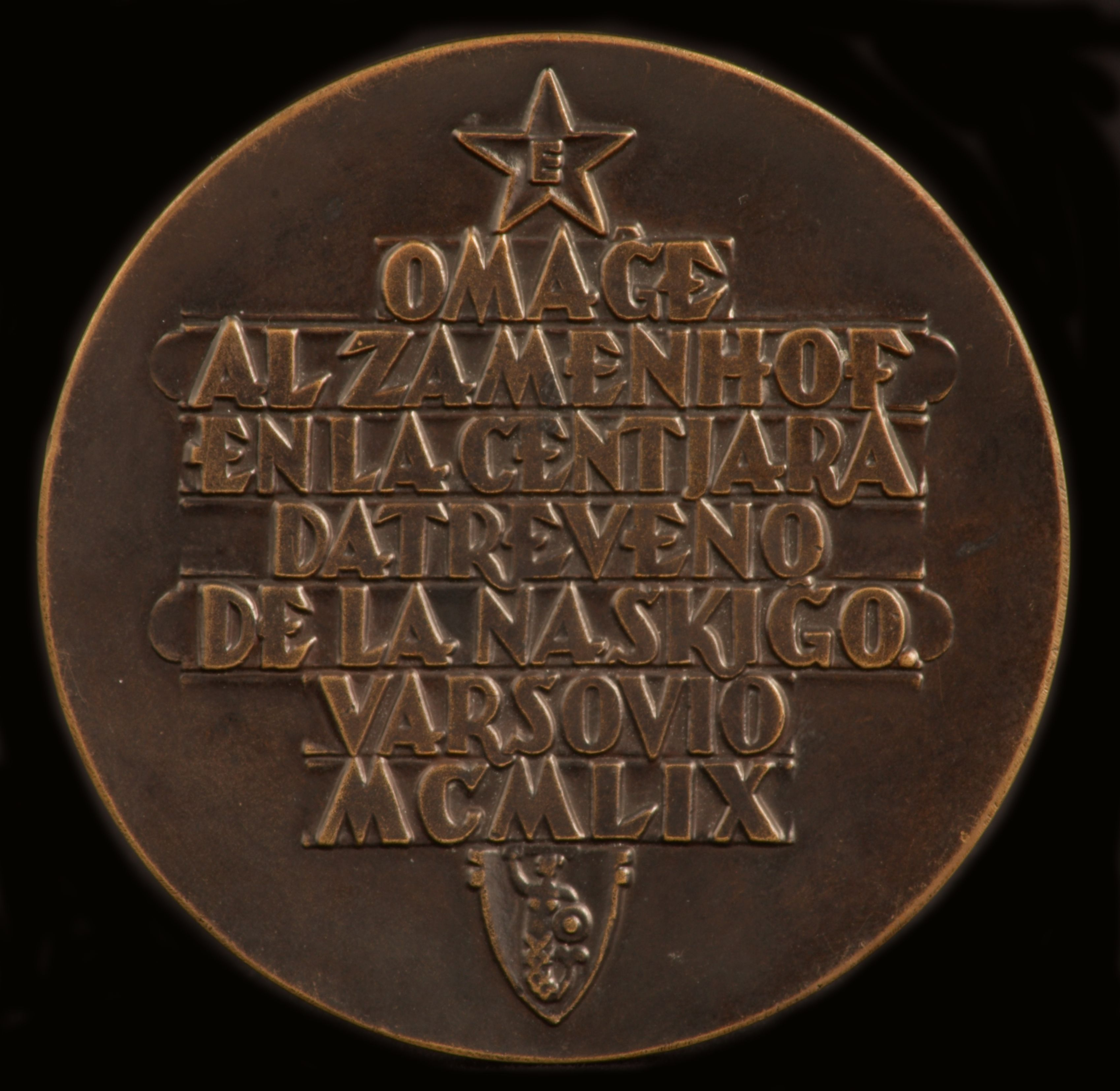
Reverse of medal with Ludovic Lazarus Zamenhof (1959)

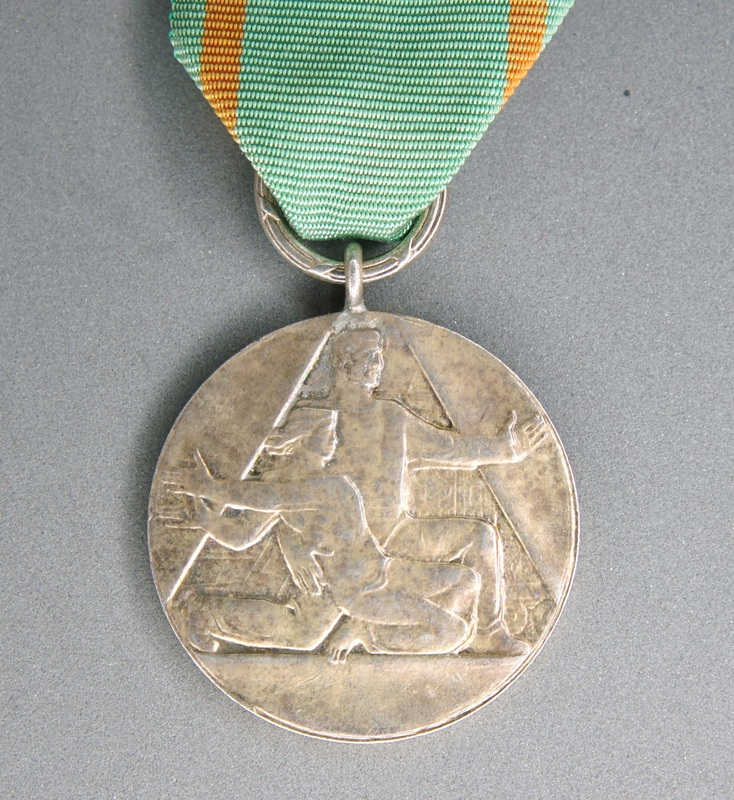
Medal for Sacrifice and Courage (1960)

== Bibliography ==
- Rudzka, Anna (2009). Józef Gosławski. Rzeźby, monety, medale (in Polish). Warsaw: Alegoria. ISBN 978-83-62248-00-1.
- Józef Gosławski 1908–1963. Wystawa prac (in Polish). Warsaw: Związek Polskich Artystów Plastyków. Centralne Biuro Wystaw Artystycznych. 1973.
- Słownik artystów polskich i obcych w Polsce działających (in Polish). Vol. II. Wrocław: Ossolineum. 1975.
- Rudzka, Maria Anna (2003). Józef Gosławski. Wystawa w 40-lecie śmierci (in Polish). ISBN 83-89099-46-2.
- Głuchowski, Krzysztof (2001). "Józwa Gosławski". Śladami pradziadów (in Polish). London: Polonia Aid Foundation Trust. ISBN 1-872286-69-0.
- Rudzka, Maria Anna (2008). "Józef Gosławski - formy duże i małe". Rzeźba w Polsce (1945–2008). Rocznik "Rzeźba polska" (in Polish). Vol. XIII. Orońsko: Centrum Rzeźby Polskiej. ISBN 978-83-85901-71-6.
- Anna Rudzka (July 2008). "It's worth looking up...". Zabytki. Heritage. 7 (30). Warsaw: Przedsiębiorstwo Wydawnicze Rzeczpospolita SA: 6–9. ISSN 1640-0194.
- Anna Rudzka (July 2008). "Copernicus, a fisherman and elk, this is about Józef Gosławski's coins". Zabytki. Heritage. 7 (30). Warsaw: Przedsiębiorstwo Wydawnicze Rzeczpospolita SA: 10–13. ISSN 1640-0194.
