= Żelazowa Wola =

- Village
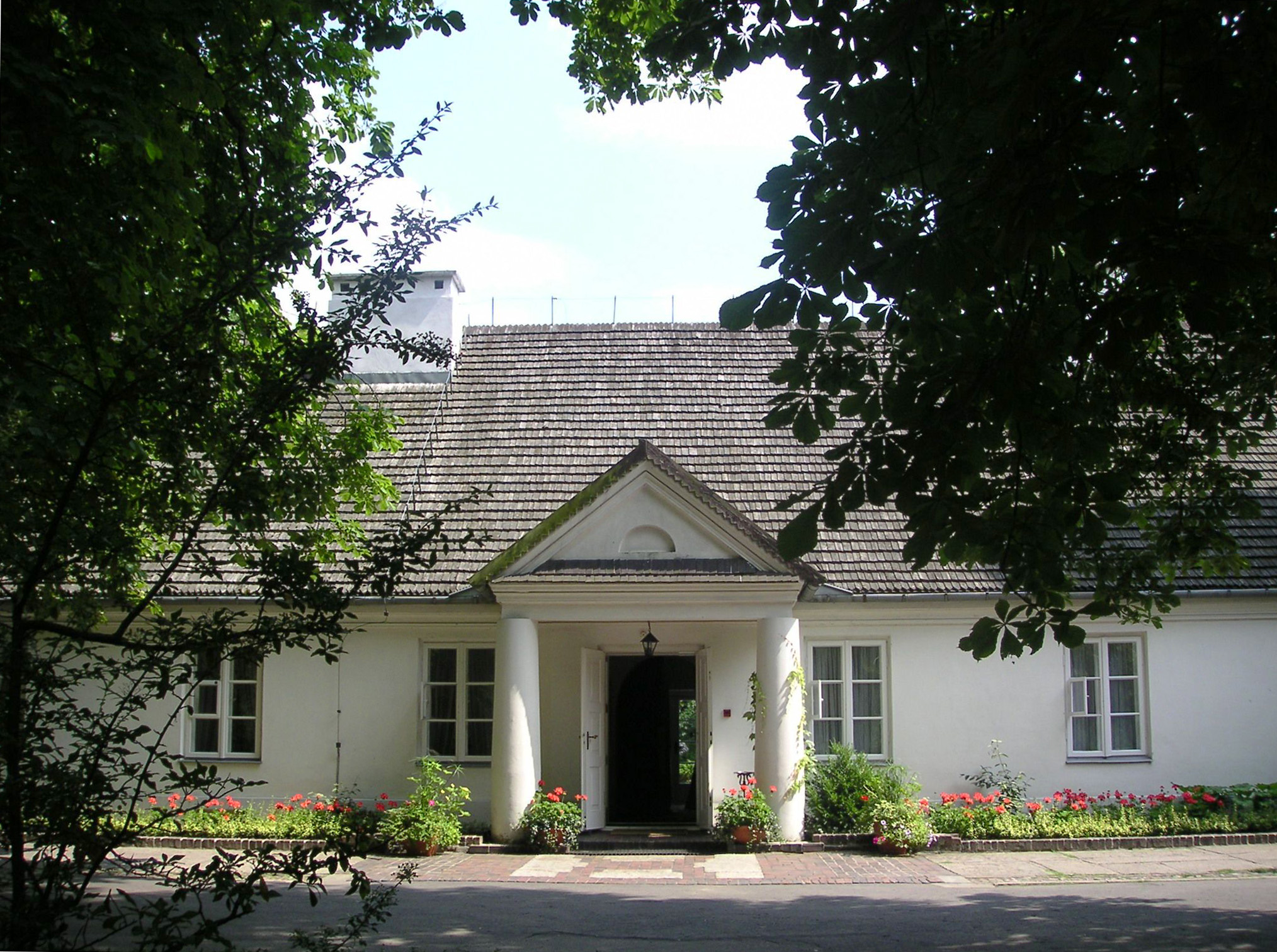
- Chopin's birthplace

- Location within Poland
- Coordinates: 52°15′N 20°19′E
- Country: Poland
- Voivodeship: Masovian
- County: Sochaczew
- Gmina: Sochaczew
- Population: 65

Żelazowa Wola (Polish pronunciation: [ʐɛlaˈzɔva ˈvɔla]) is a village in Gmina Sochaczew, Sochaczew County, Masovian Voivodeship, in east-central Poland.

== Description ==
The village is known for being the birthplace of the Polish pianist and composer Frédéric Chopin, and for its picturesque Masovian landscape, including numerous winding streams surrounded by willows and hills.

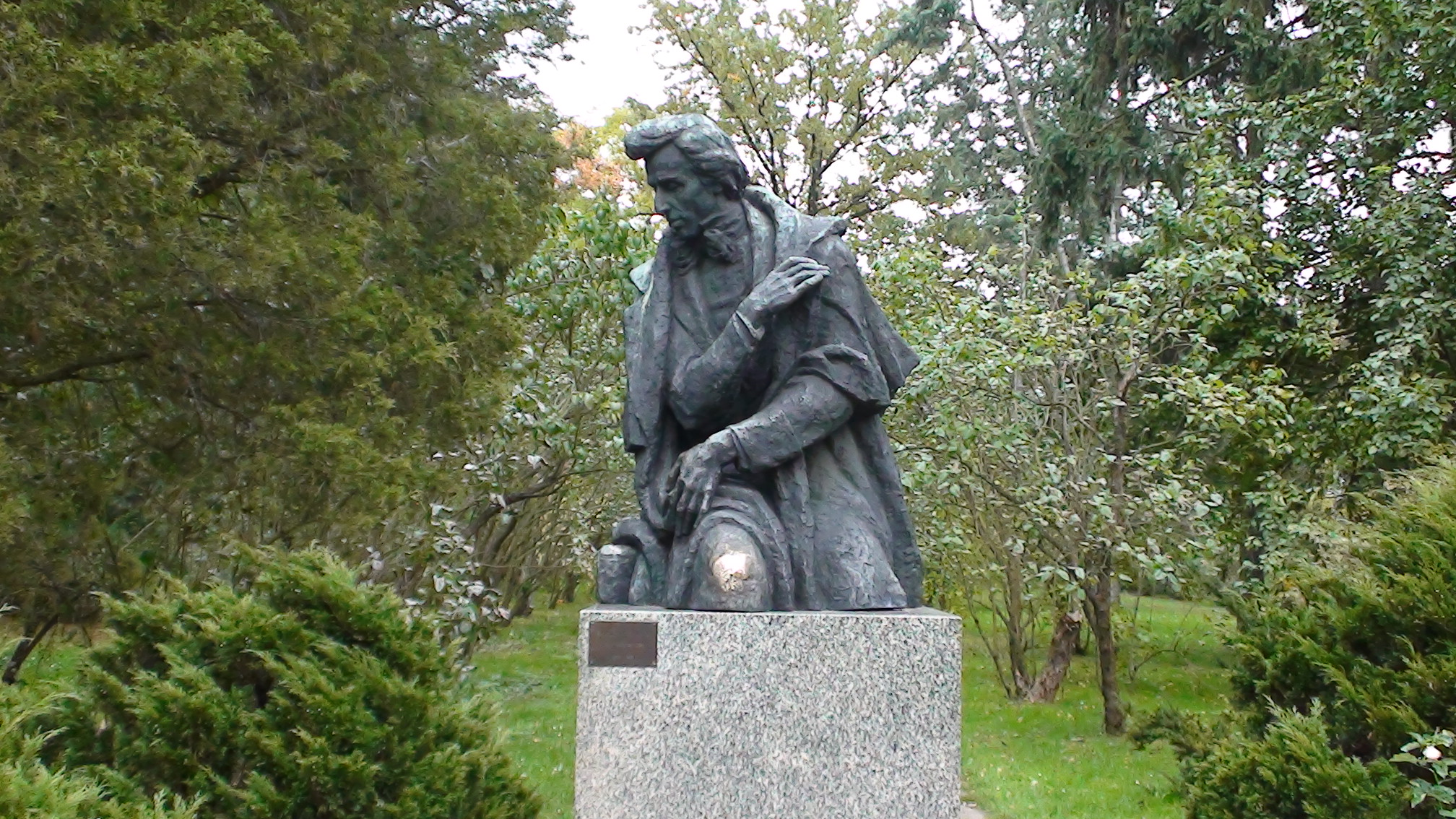
Chopin monument at Żelazowa Wola, by Józef Gosławski

In 1909, in celebration of Chopin's centenary, Russian composer Sergei Lyapunov wrote the symphonic poem Zhelazova Vola (Żelazowa Wola), Op. 37 (Russian: Желязова-Воля), "in memory of Chopin".

Housed in an annex to Chopins's home, surrounded by a park, is a museum devoted to the composer. In summer, concerts of his music are performed by pianists from all over the world, who play inside the family home for an outside audience. In an adjacent park is a monument to the pianist, designed by Józef Gosławski.
