= Memorials to Frédéric Chopin =

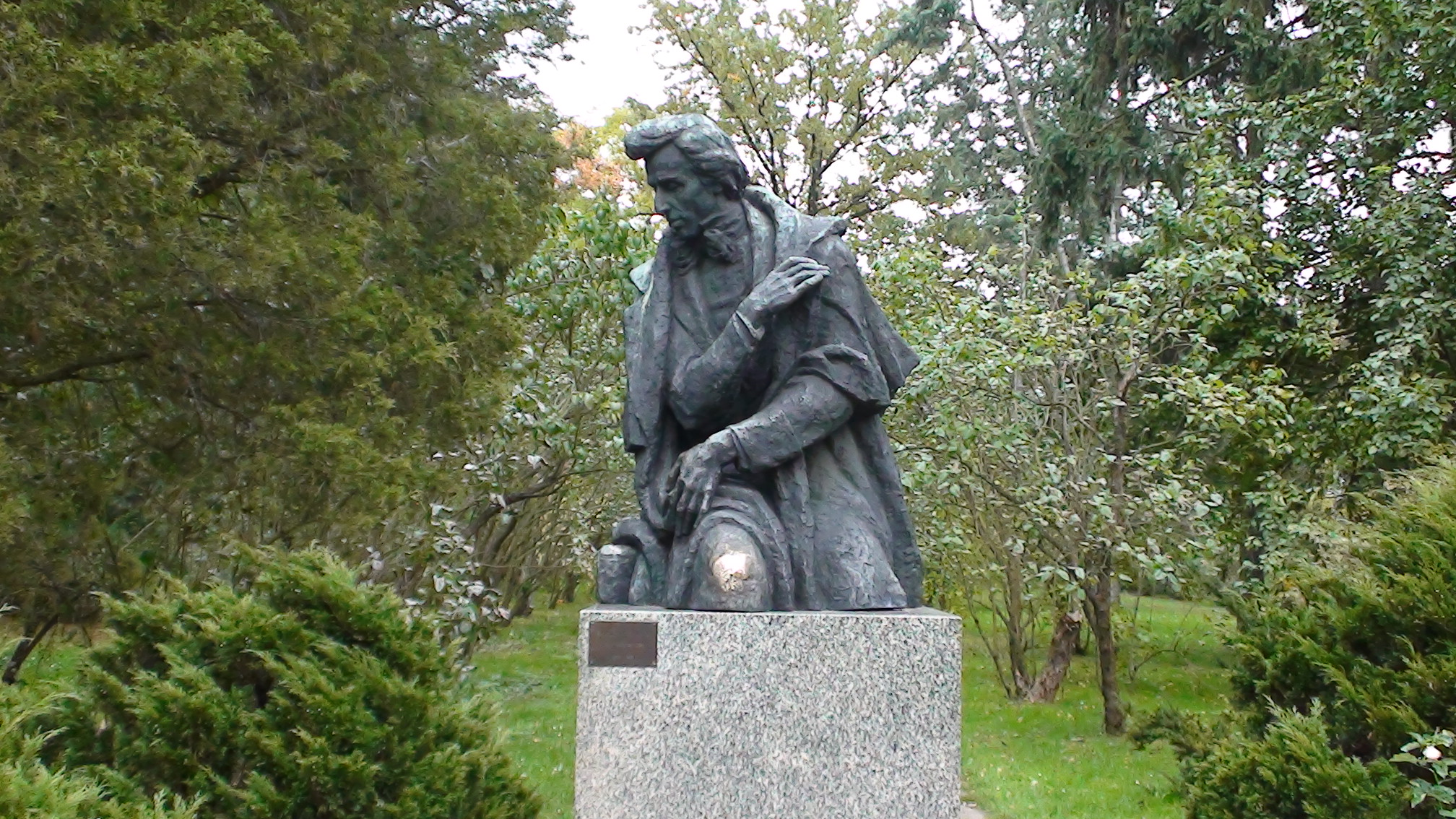
Frédéric Chopin monument in Żelazowa Wola, the composer's birthplace

The following is a compilation of memorials to the composer Frédéric Chopin in the form of physical monuments, institutions, and other entities named after him.

== Chopin's Polish residences ==
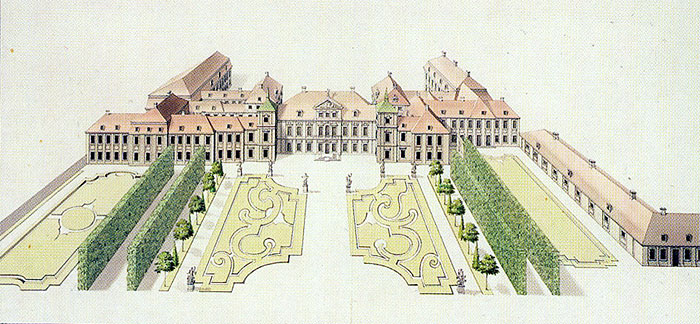
Saxon Palace, seen from Saxon Garden behind the Palace, 1764. Chopin and his family lived here from 1810 until 1817. The Saxon Palace was destroyed in World War II.

Fryderyk Chopin's principal Polish residences survive — most of them rebuilt from the devastations of World War II — except for the Saxon Palace, where his father Mikołaj Chopin in October 1810 (when Fryderyk was six months old) took a post teaching French at the Warsaw Lyceum, housed in the Saxon Palace. The Chopin family lived on the premises.

In 1817, the Saxon Palace was requisitioned by Warsaw's Russian governor for military use, and the Warsaw Lyceum was reestablished in the Kazimierz Palace (today the rectorate of Warsaw University). Fryderyk and his family moved to an extant building (center photo, below) adjacent to the Kazimierz Palace.

In 1827, soon after the death of Chopin's youngest sister Emilia, the family moved from the Warsaw University building adjacent to the Kazimierz Palace, to lodgings just across the street from the university in the south annex of the Krasiński Palace on Krakowskie Przedmieście. Chopin lived there until he left Warsaw in 1830. The Krasiński Palace is now the Warsaw Academy of Fine Arts.

Chopin's Żelazowa Wola birthplace, and the Chopin family parlor in Warsaw's Krasiński Palace, are maintained as museums open to the public.

The Germans destroyed the Saxon Palace in World War II. Plans have been put forward to rebuild it. It was in the Saxon Palace (at the time, the Polish General Staff building) that civilian mathematicians working at the General Staff's Cipher Bureau, beginning in 1932, broke Germany's Enigma machine ciphers — an achievement that would be of great importance to the outcome of World War II.

Some of Chopin's Polish residences

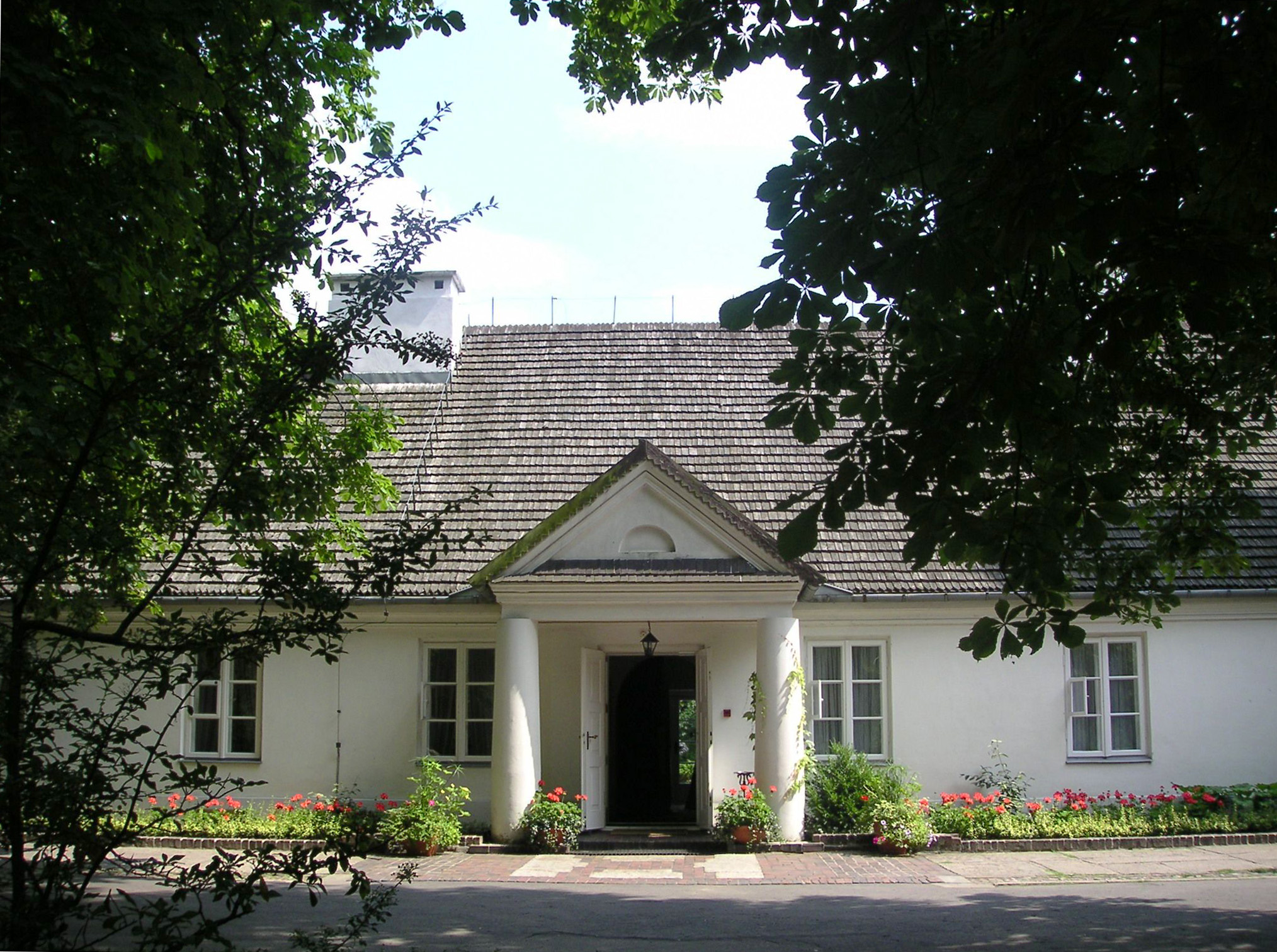
Chopin's Żelazowa Wola birthplace. He lived here for six months in 1810.

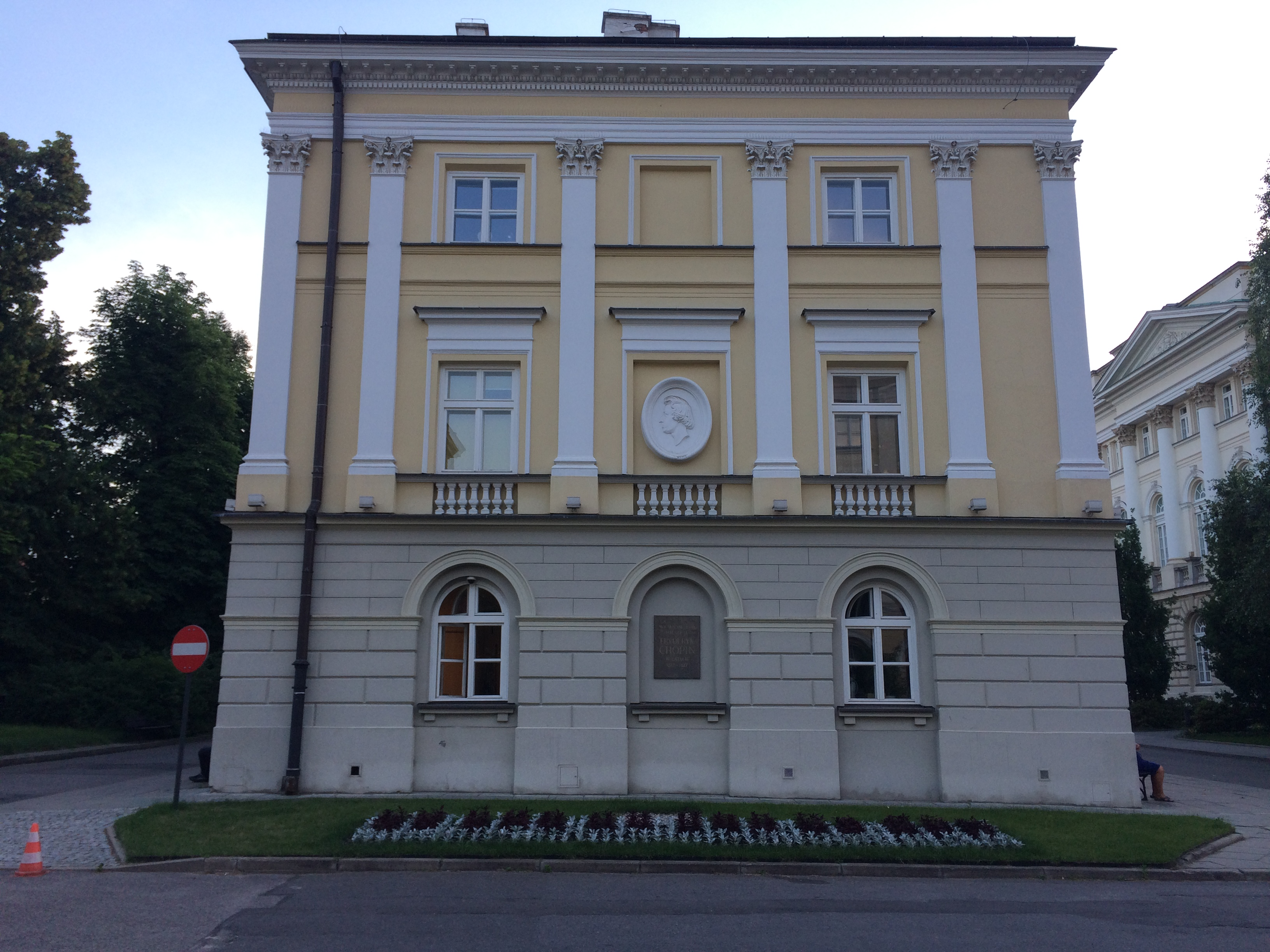
Warsaw University building where Chopin's family lived, 1817–27, embellished (center) with his profile and (foreground) with a piano keyboard formed of flowers, June 2018

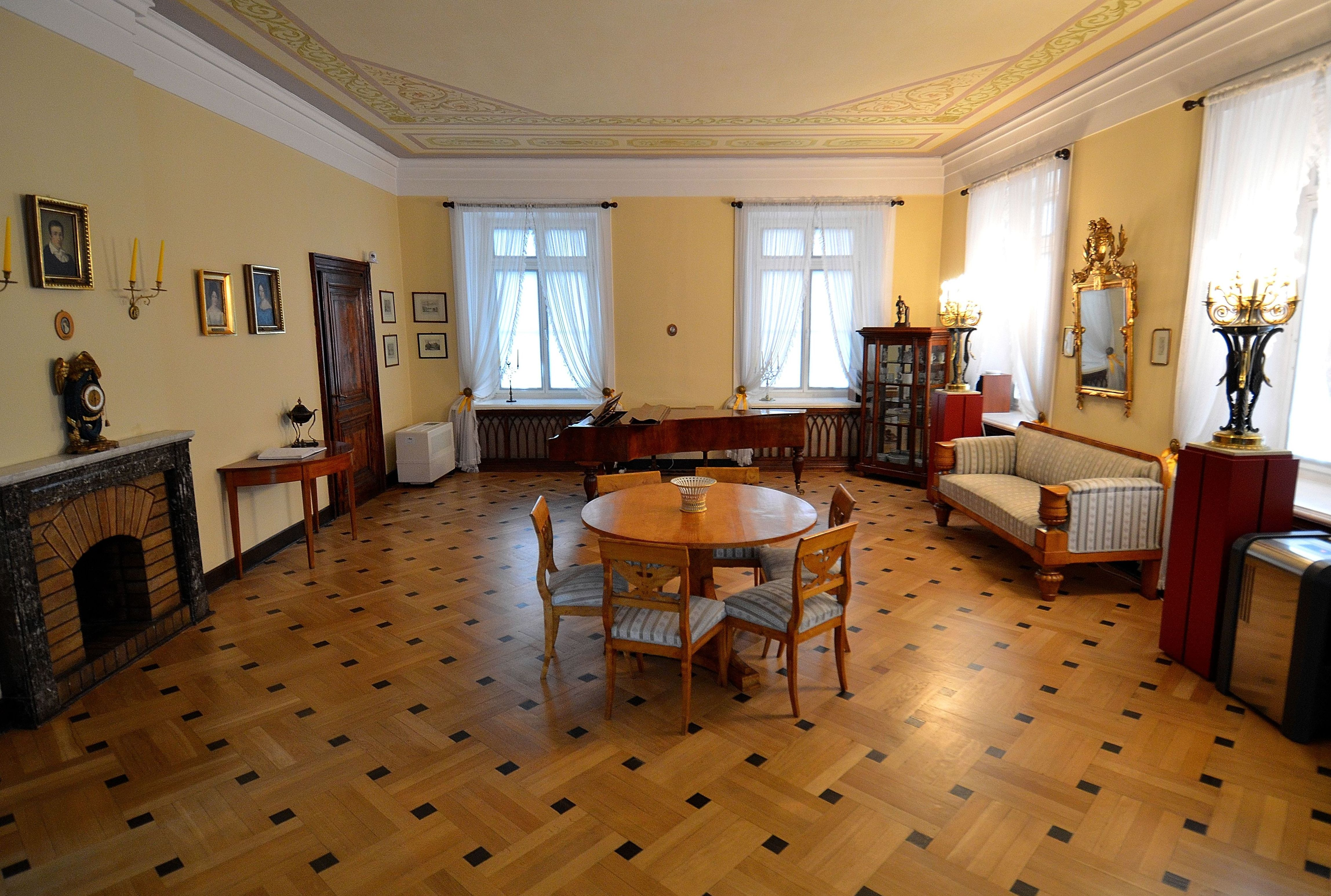
Chopin family parlor, in Warsaw's Krasiński Palace. Chopin lived here from 1827 until 1830.

== Physical monuments ==
=== Poland ===
- Chopin's heart, preserved in alcohol, was sealed in 1882 within a pillar of the Holy Cross Church, behind a tablet carved by Leonard Marconi. The tablet bears an inscription from Matthew VI:21: "For where your treasure is, there will your heart be also." (See photo of the Church pillar, with epitaph.)
- The Holy Cross Church stands only a short distance from Chopin's last Warsaw residence, the Krasiński Palace, which bears a plaque commemorating Chopin.
- There are three Chopin monuments in Żelazowa Wola: an obelisk from 1894, a bronze statue from 1969, and a sandstone bust from 1984.
- There is a monument to Chopin at the Szafarnia manor house where he stayed for holidays with a school friend in 1824 and 1825.
- In 1897, a Chopin memorial was erected in the town of Duszniki-Zdrój, where in 1826, 16-year-old Chopin played his first concert outside of the Russian Partition of Poland. A Chopin statue was erected in 1976, and it stands in the Spa Park in front of the Fryderyk Chopin Theatre.
- In 1926, a bronze statue of Chopin, designed by sculptor Wacław Szymanowski in 1907, was erected in the upper part of Warsaw's Royal Baths (Łazienki) Park.
- Other statues and busts of Chopin stand in Poznań (1923), Wrocław (2004), Żychlin (2010), Antonin, Brdów, Radziejowice, Międzyzdroje, Bydgoszcz (ca. 1973), Słupsk (1976), Ustka (1979), Kraków (2005).
- For the 2010 bicentennial of Chopin's birth, 14 "Chopin's Warsaw" ("Warszawa Chopina") benches were placed in Warsaw near Chopin landmarks. They stand near Chopin landmarks such as the Krasiński Palace, the Carmelite Church where he played the organ as a boy, and the Wessel Palace where in 1830 he boarded a stage for Vienna. Pressing a button on a bench makes it play a few bars of a Chopin composition.
- Memorial plaques in Warsaw (numerous), Antonin (commemorating two visits to the Radziwiłł Palace), Toruń (commemorating a visit in 1825), Kalisz (commemorating visits in years 1826-1830), Sanniki (commemorating a visit in 1828), Sulechów (commemorating a visit in 1828), Silna (commemorating a visit in 1828), Wrocław (commemorating a concert in 1830), Poznań (on the courtyard of the Poznań Society of Friends of Learning).
- Monument in Poturzyn, commemorating a visit in 1830 (1985).
- Memorial stones in Kozłowo (commemorating a visit in 1825), Waplewo Wielkie (commemorating a visit and concert in 1827) and Strzyżew.
- In 2007, a bronze bust of Frédéric Chopin, the patron of the Polish Baltic Philharmonic, by sculptor Gennady Jerszow was placed in the Philharmonic in Gdańsk.
- Obelisks in the Chopin Park in Gliwice (1949) and in Sochaczew (2010).
Chopin monuments and memorials in Poland

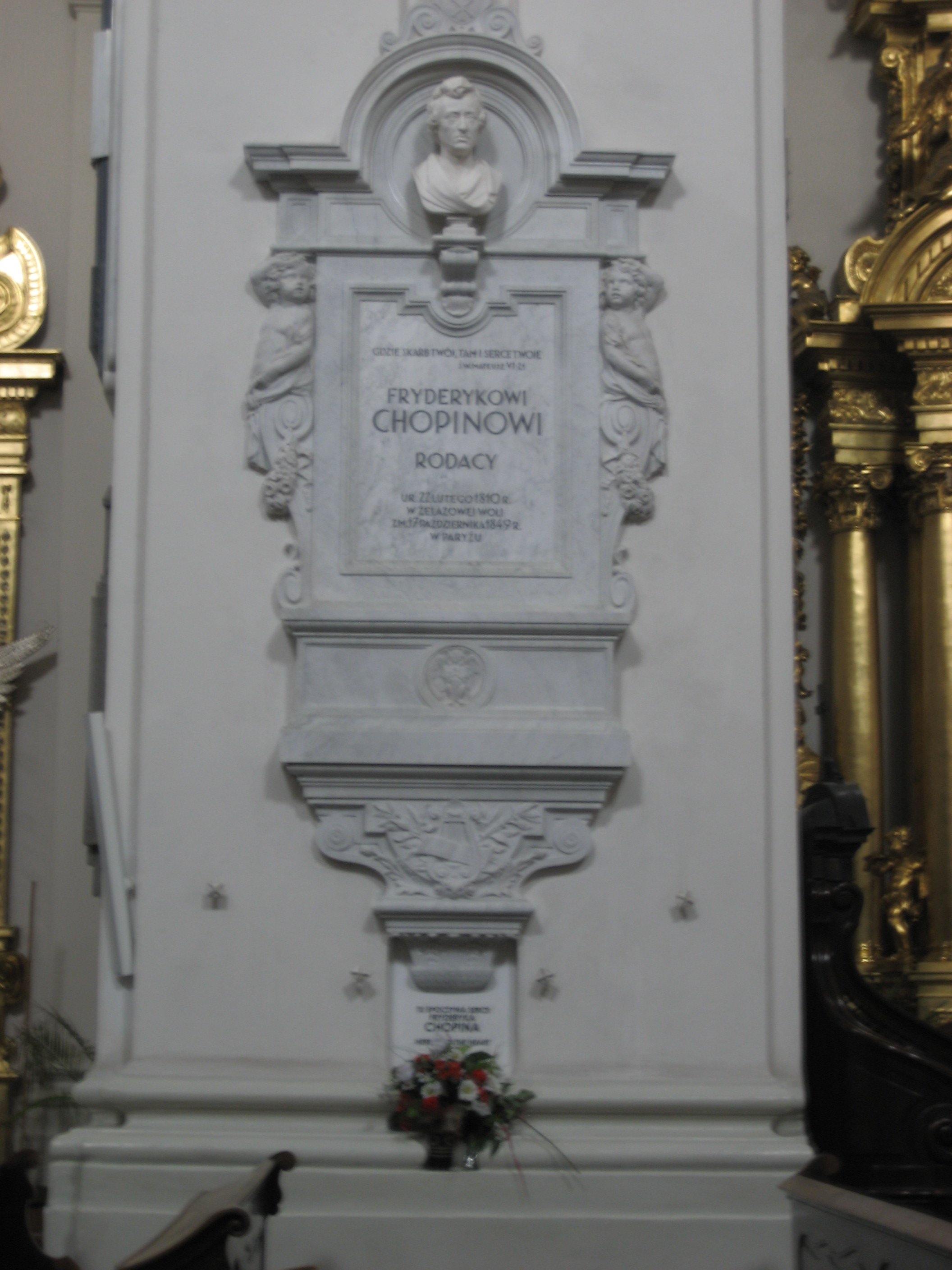
Funerary monument on a pillar in Holy Cross Church, Warsaw, enclosing Chopin's heart (just above the bouquet at the bottom)

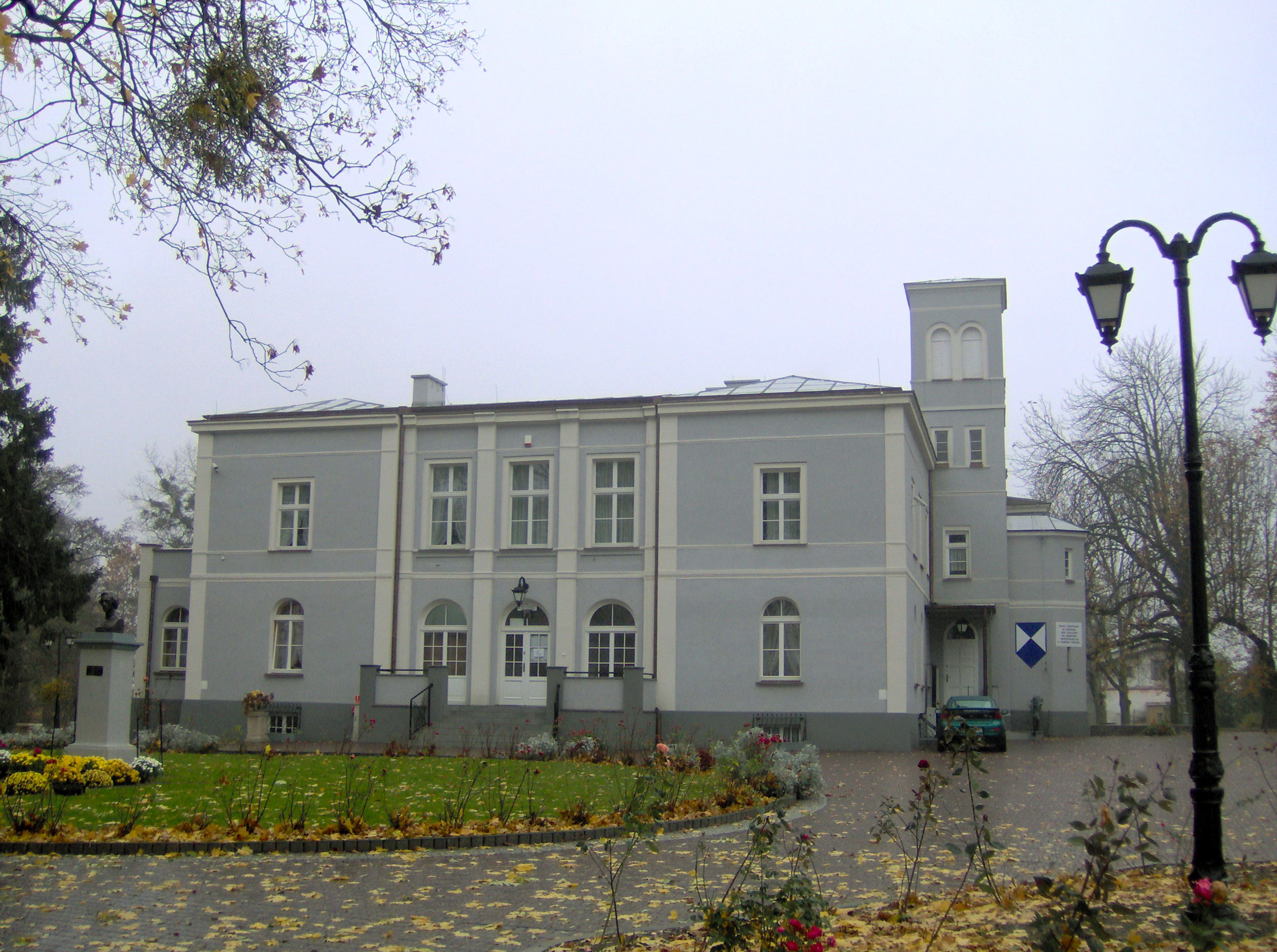
General Dominik Dziewanowski's Szafarnia manor (with Chopin's bust in front) where Chopin vacationed in 1824 and 1825; now a Chopin Center

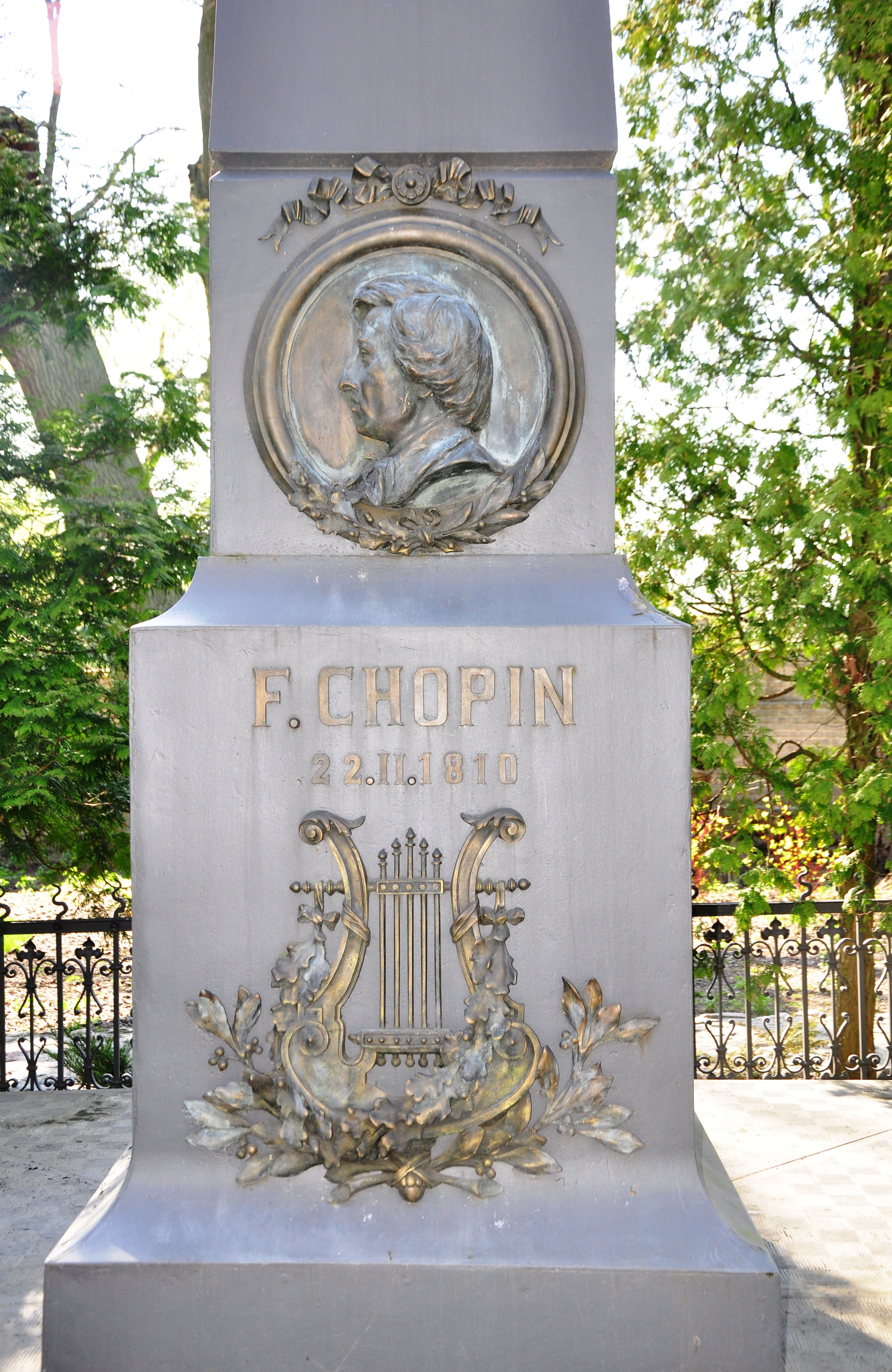
Chopin obelisk, Żelazowa Wola

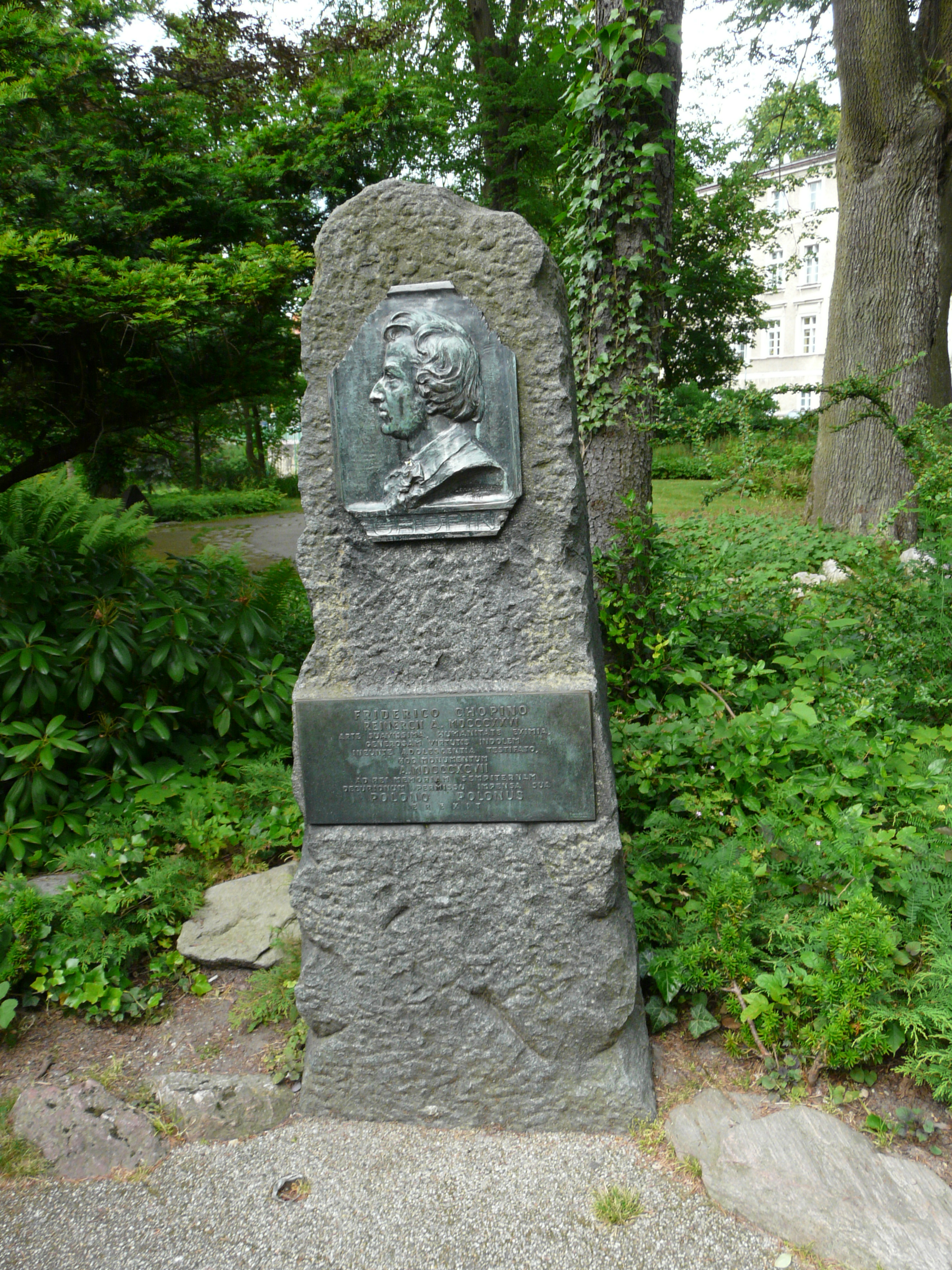
Chopin memorial from 1897, Duszniki-Zdrój

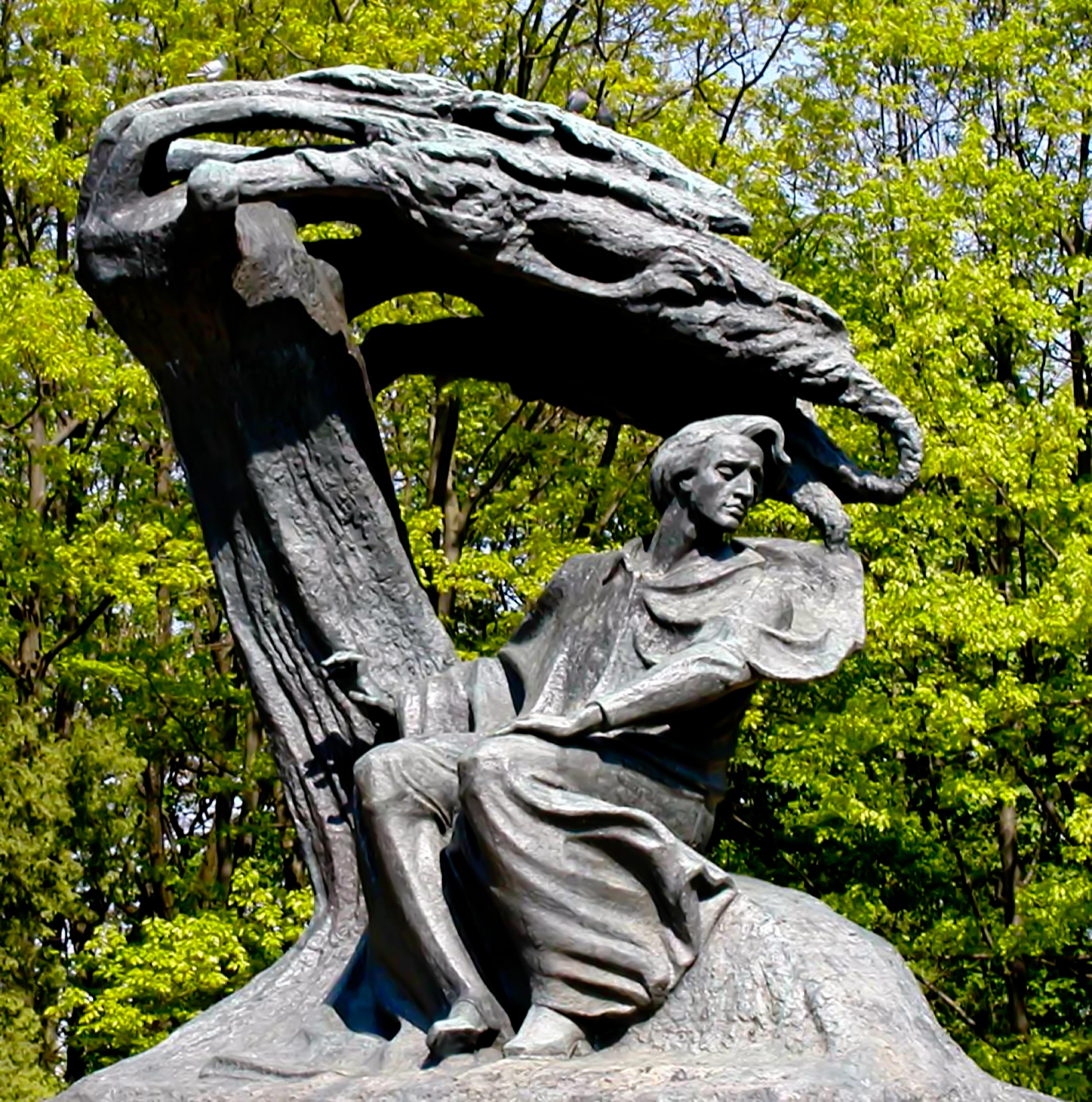
Chopin statue, Łazienki Park, Warsaw

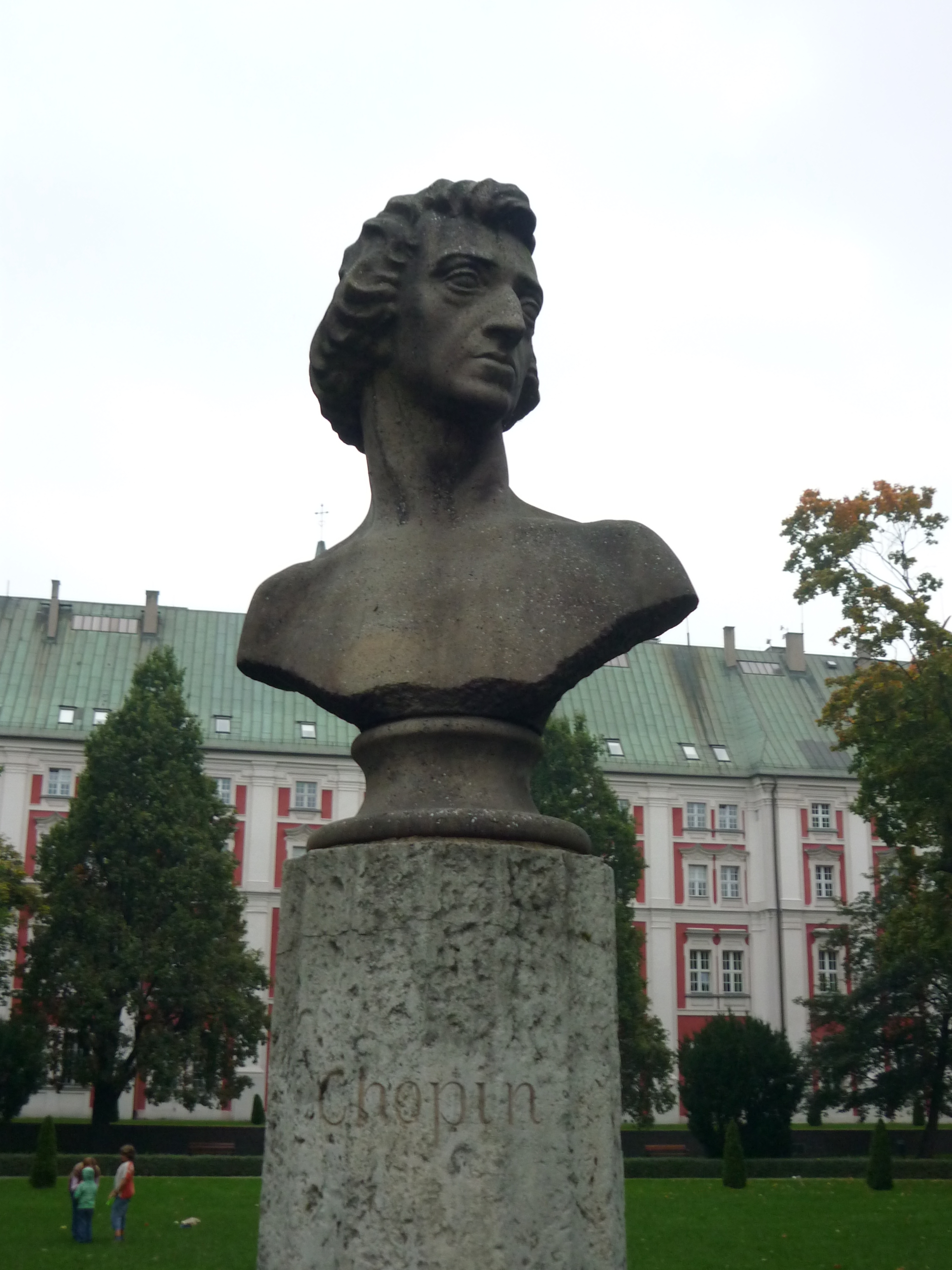
Bust, Chopin Park, Poznań

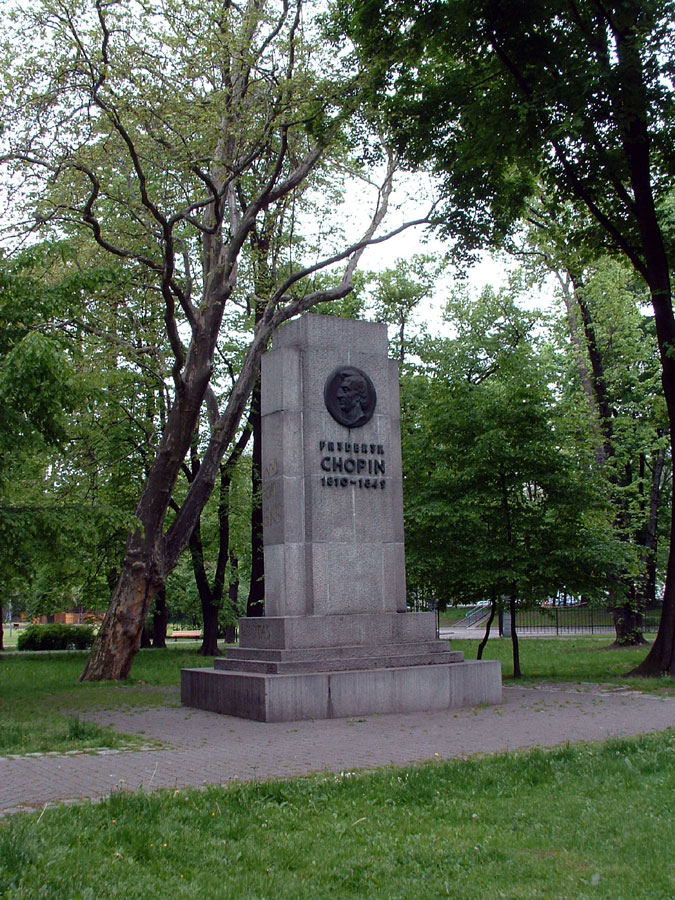
Obelisk, Chopin Park, Gliwice

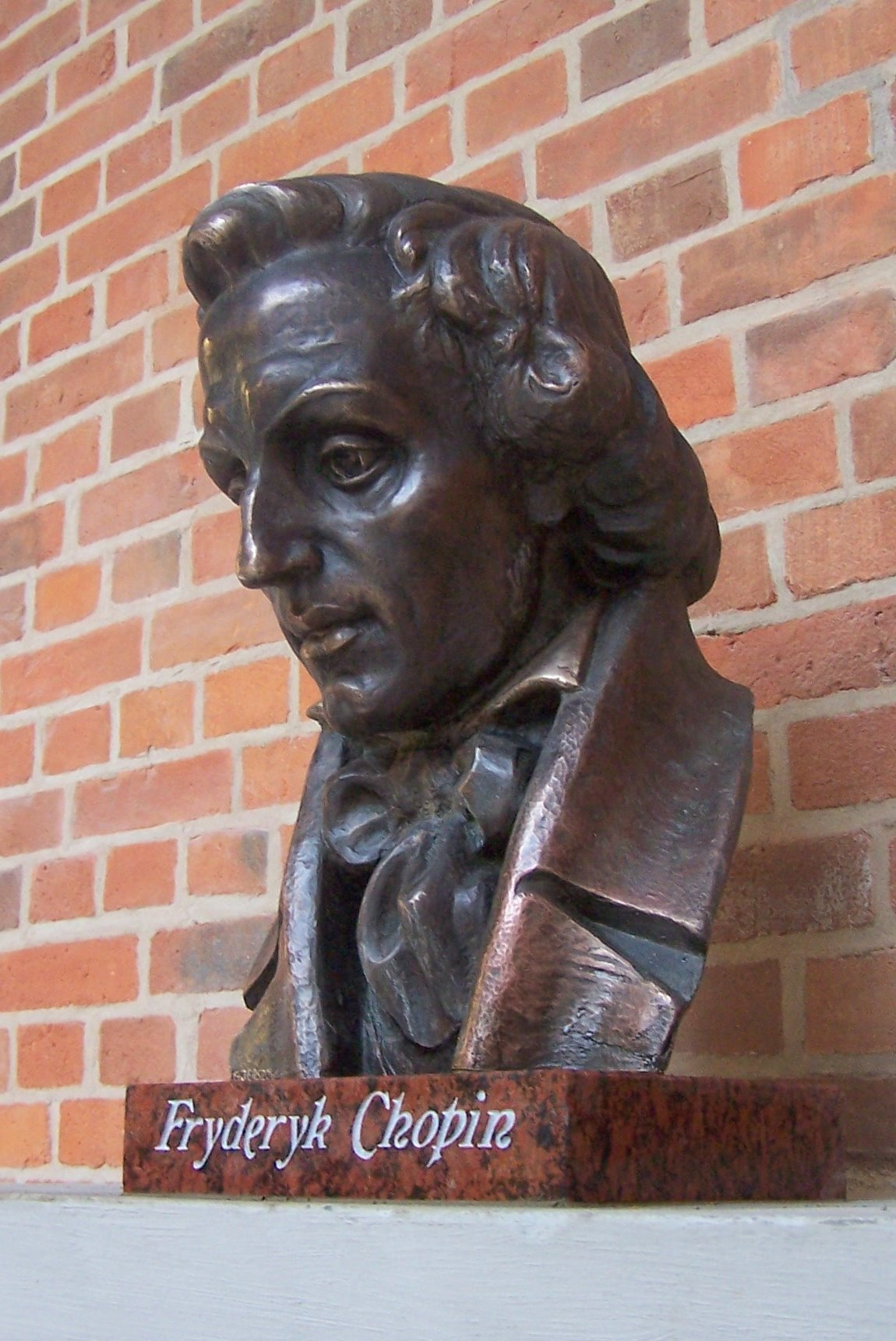
Bust Fryderyk Chopin by Gennady Jerszow. Polish Baltic F.Chopin Philharmonic in Gdańsk 2007

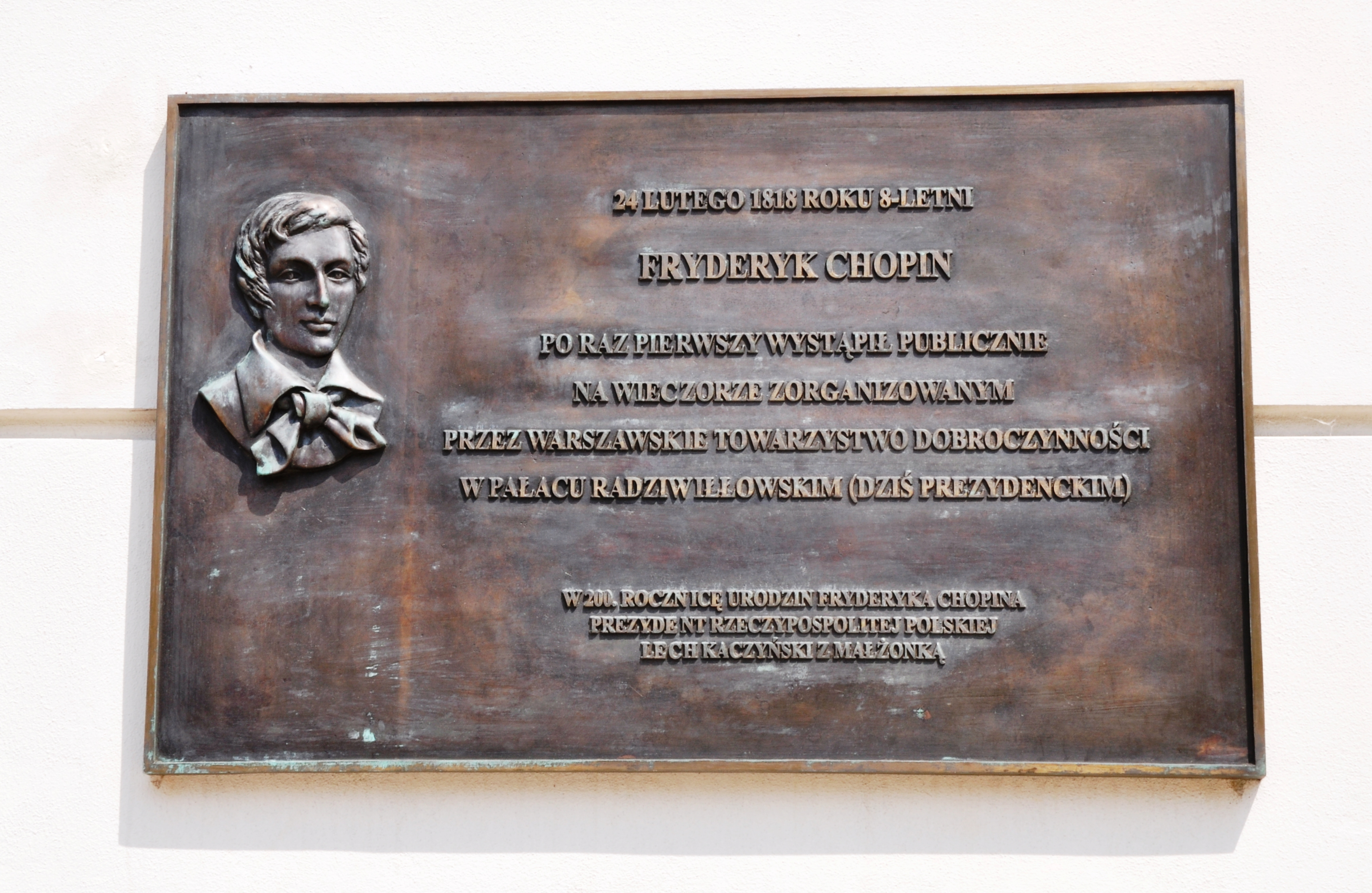
Plaque (placed in 2010, on Chopin's 200th birth anniversary) commemorating the 8-year-old's first public performance, in today's Presidential Palace, Warsaw, for the Warsaw Philanthropic Society, 24 February 1818

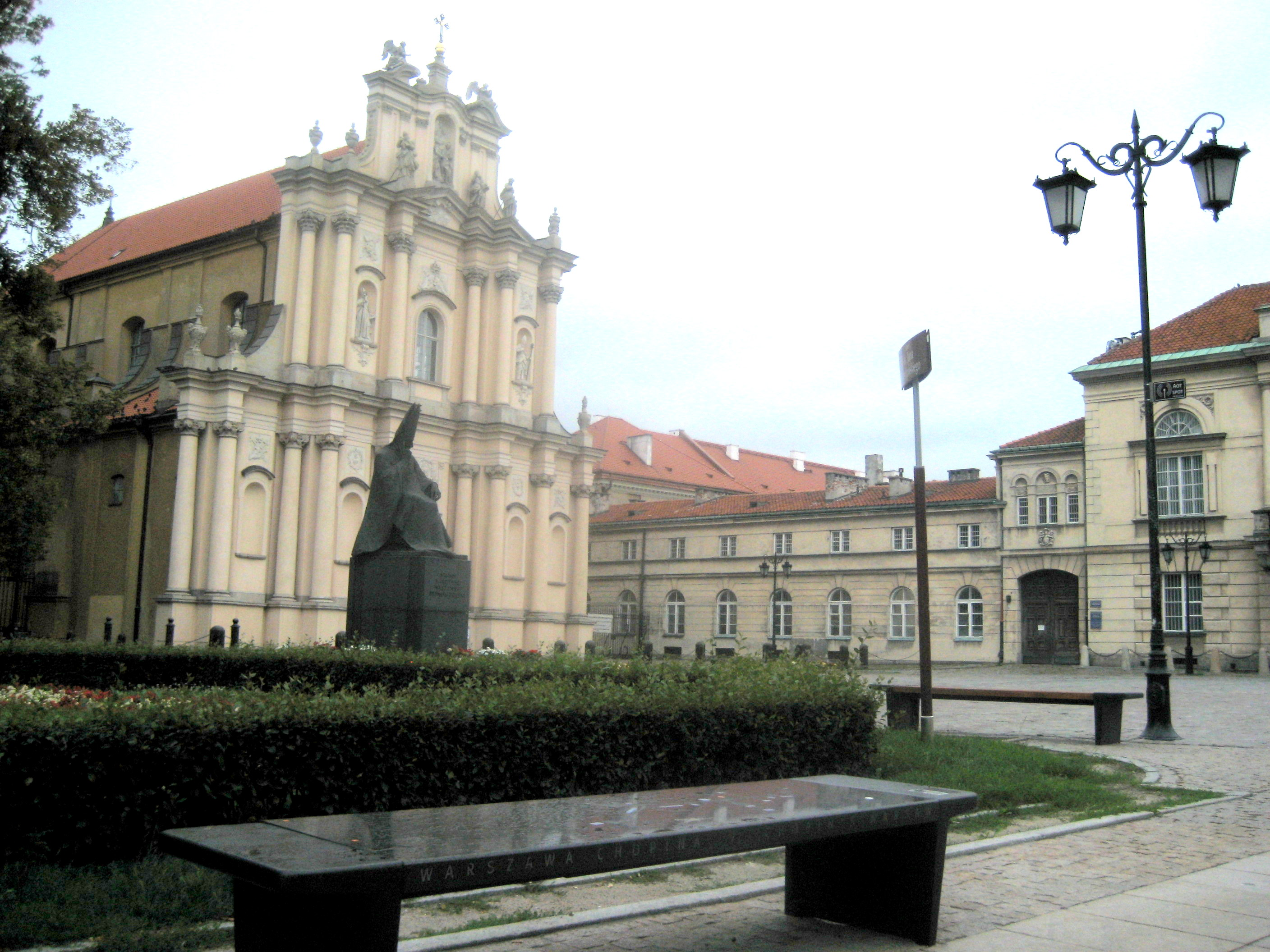
"Chopin's Warsaw" bench near the Carmelite Church.

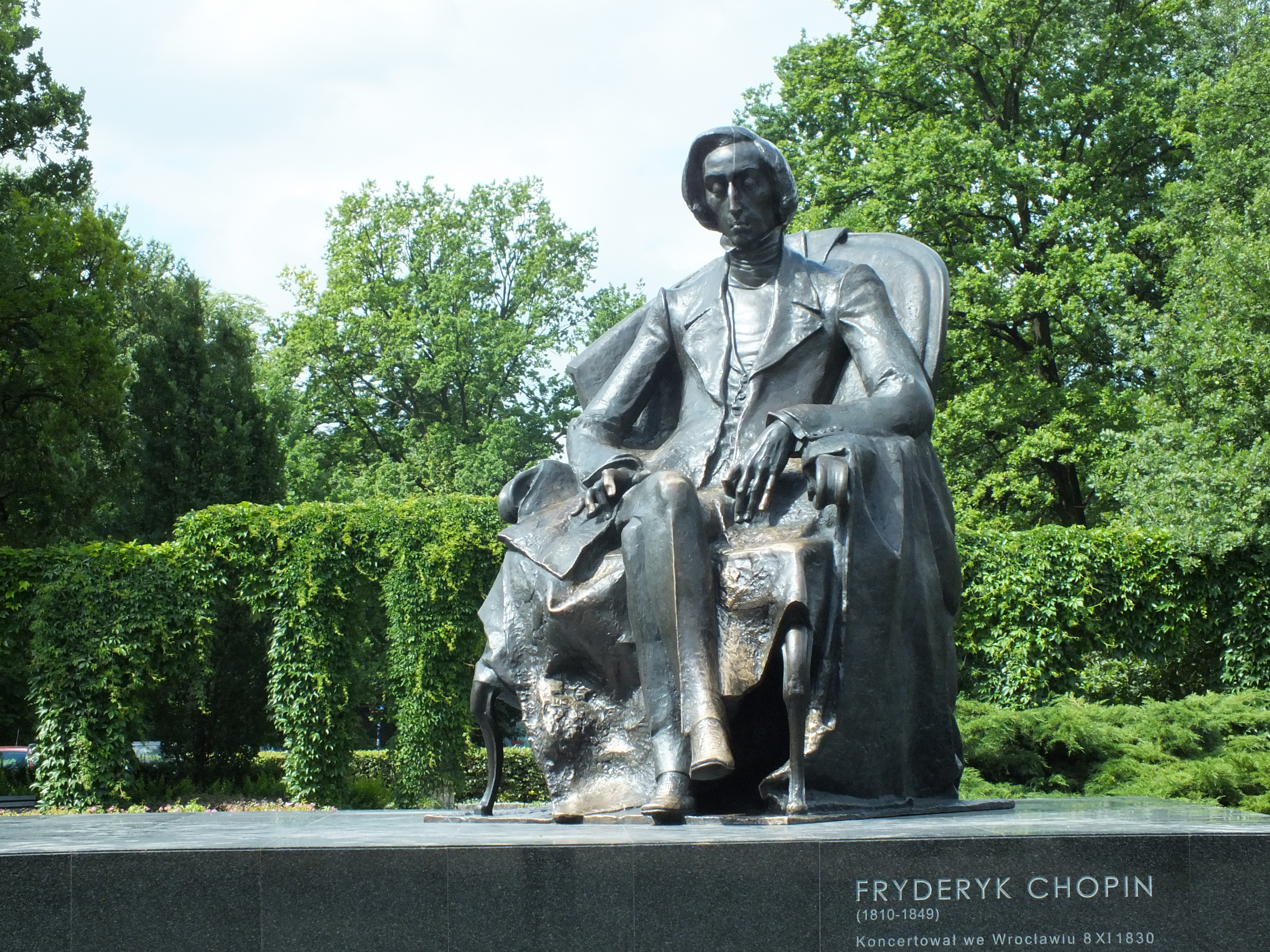
Monument, South Park, Wrocław

=== Europe ===
- France: Chopin's tombstone in Père Lachaise Cemetery, Paris, featuring the muse of music, Euterpe, weeping over a broken lyre, was designed and sculpted by Auguste Clésinger. Monuments to Chopin can also be found in Paris's Parc Monceau (1906) and Jardin du Luxembourg. Also the Salon Frédéric Chopin at the Polish Library in Paris.
- United Kingdom: monument and blue plaques in London, monument in Manchester, memorial plaques in Edinburgh and Glasgow
- Spain: busts in Valldemossa and Palma de Mallorca, memorial plaque in Barcelona
- Germany: statue in Munich's Dichtergarten, memorial plaque in Dresden, bust in Berlin's Hackesche Höfe
- Albania: bust in Tirana
- Hungary: monument in Gödöllő, bust in Budapest
- Serbia: bust in Belgrade
- Portugal: bust in Lisbon
- Netherlands: bust in Culemborg
- Czech Republic: memorial plaques in Prague and Mariánské Lázně
- Austria: memorial plaque in Vienna
- Ukraine: tenement house relief in Lviv, memorial plaque in Lutsk
- Russia: bust in Kaliningrad
Chopin monuments and memorials in Europe

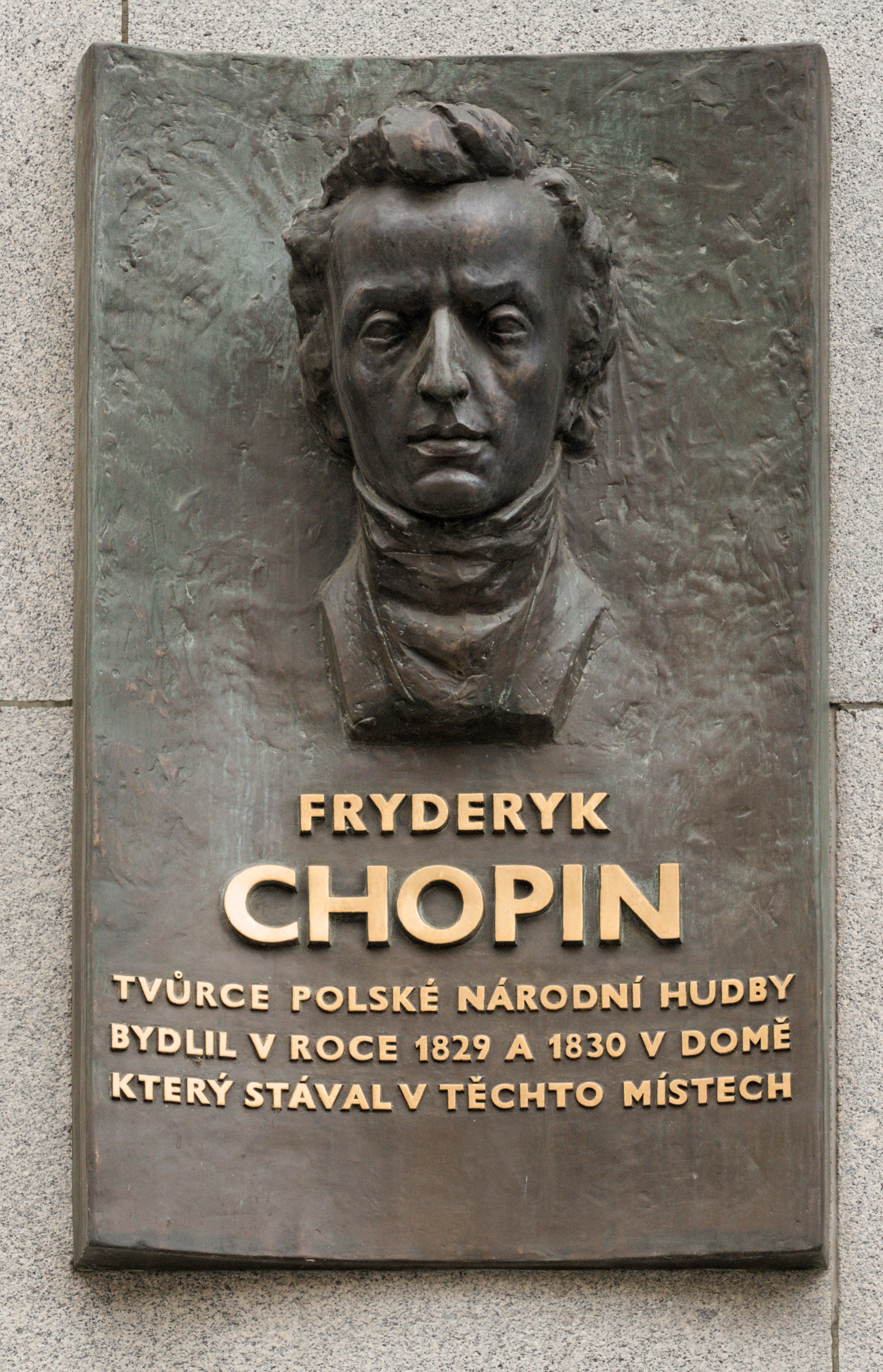
Plaque, Prague, Czech Republic, where Chopin lived 1829-30

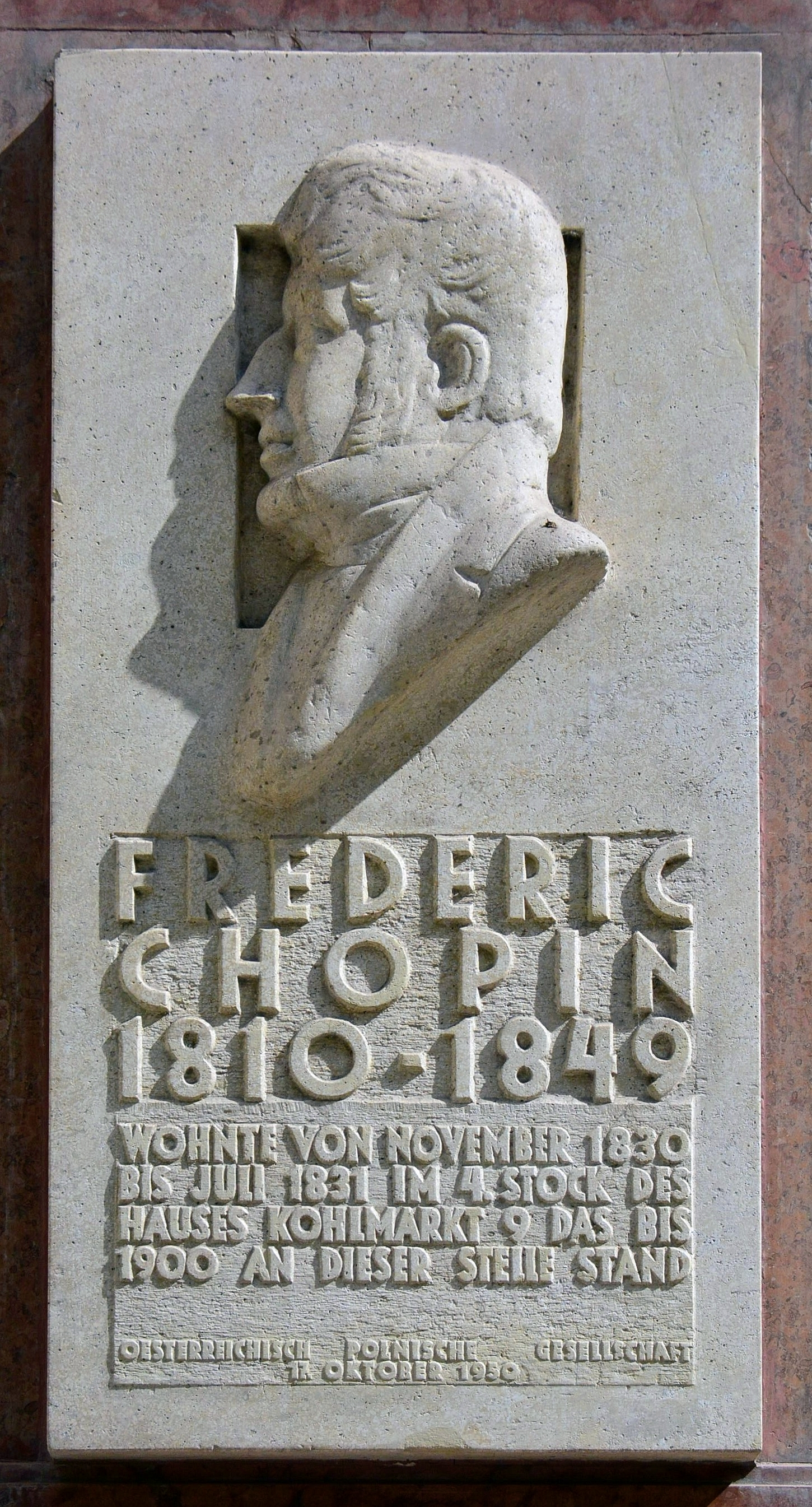
Plaque, Vienna, Austria, where Chopin lived 1830-31

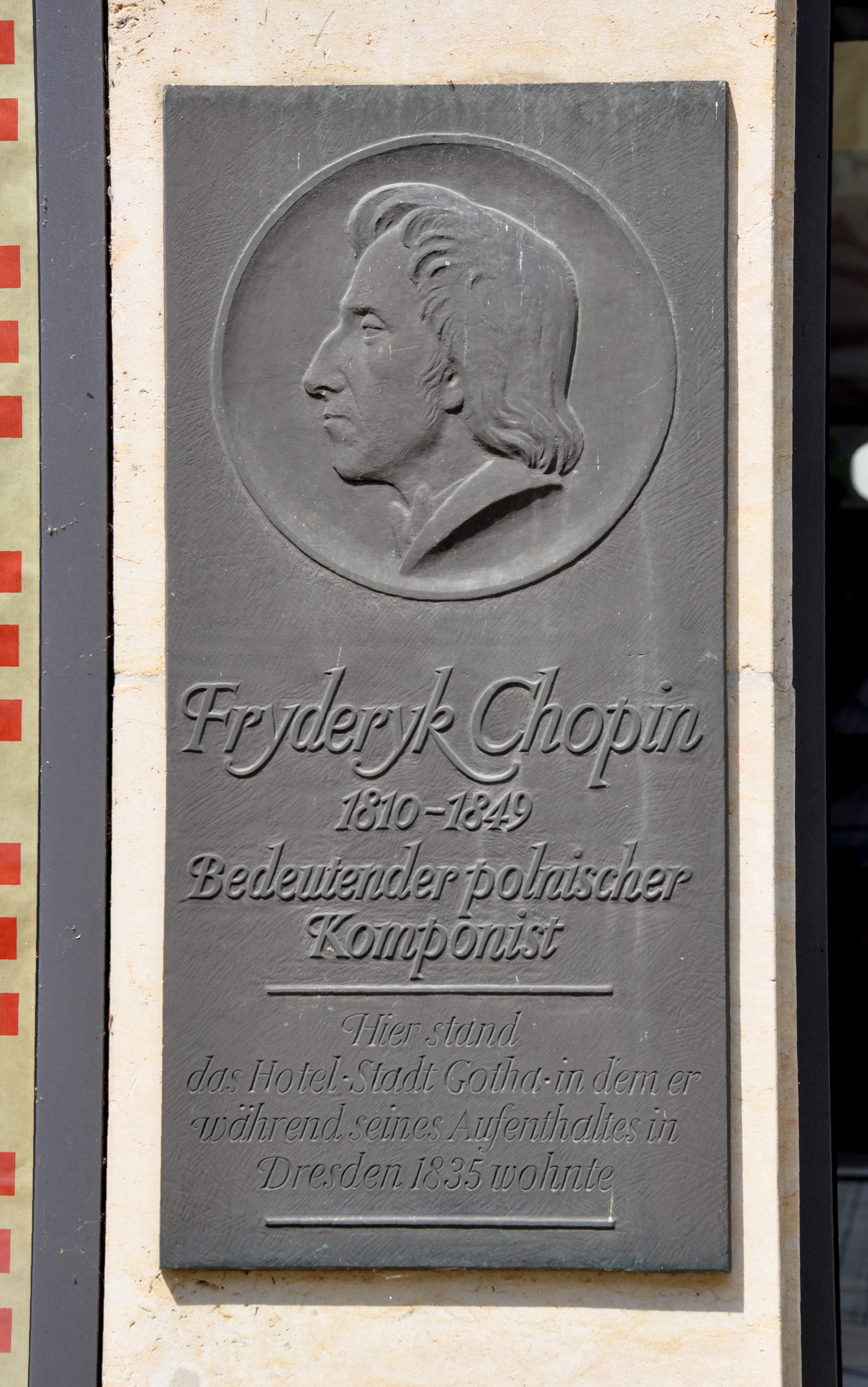
Plaque, Dresden, Saxony, where Chopin stayed 1835

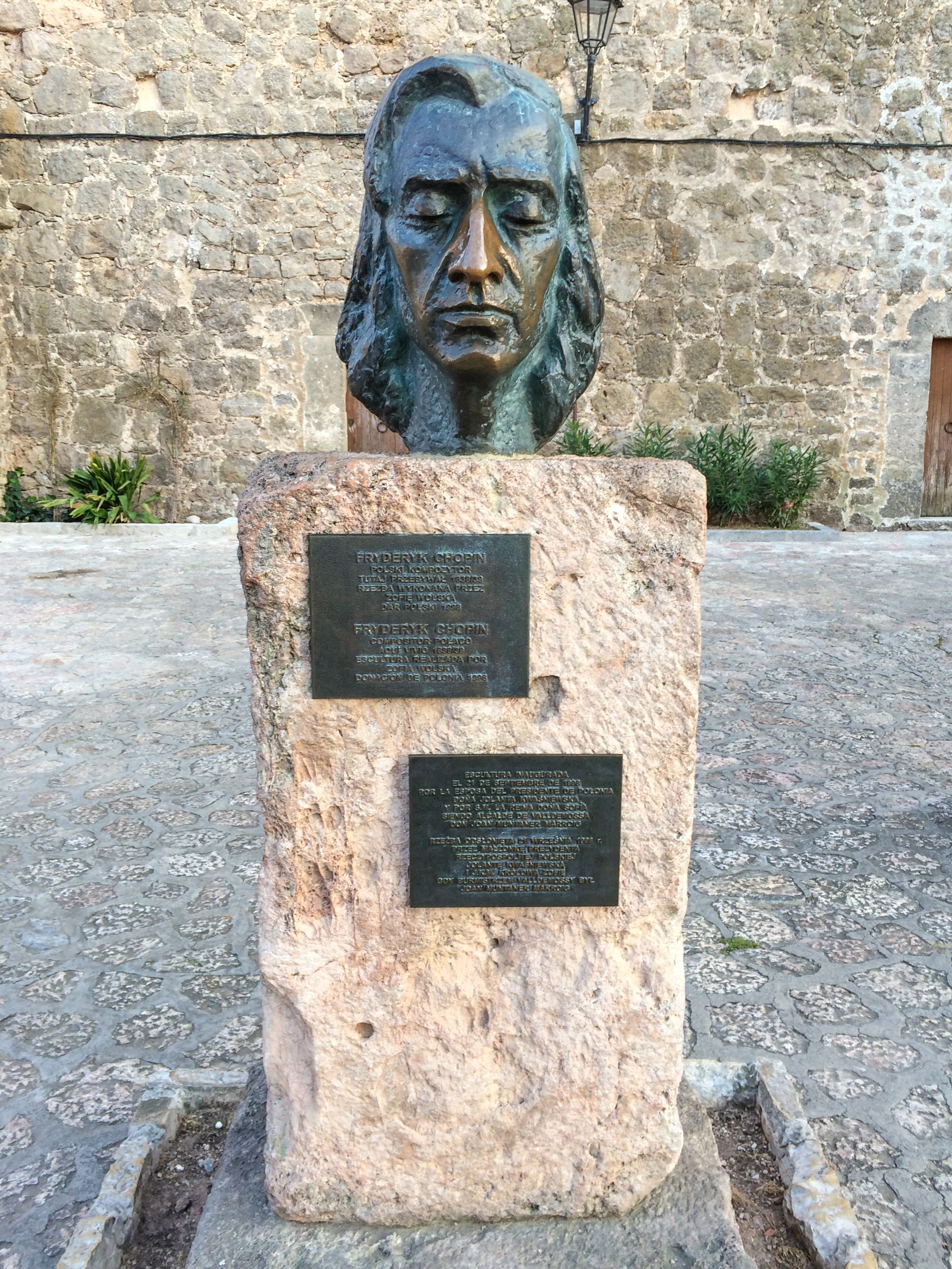
Bust, Valldemossa, Majorca, where Chopin stayed 1838-39

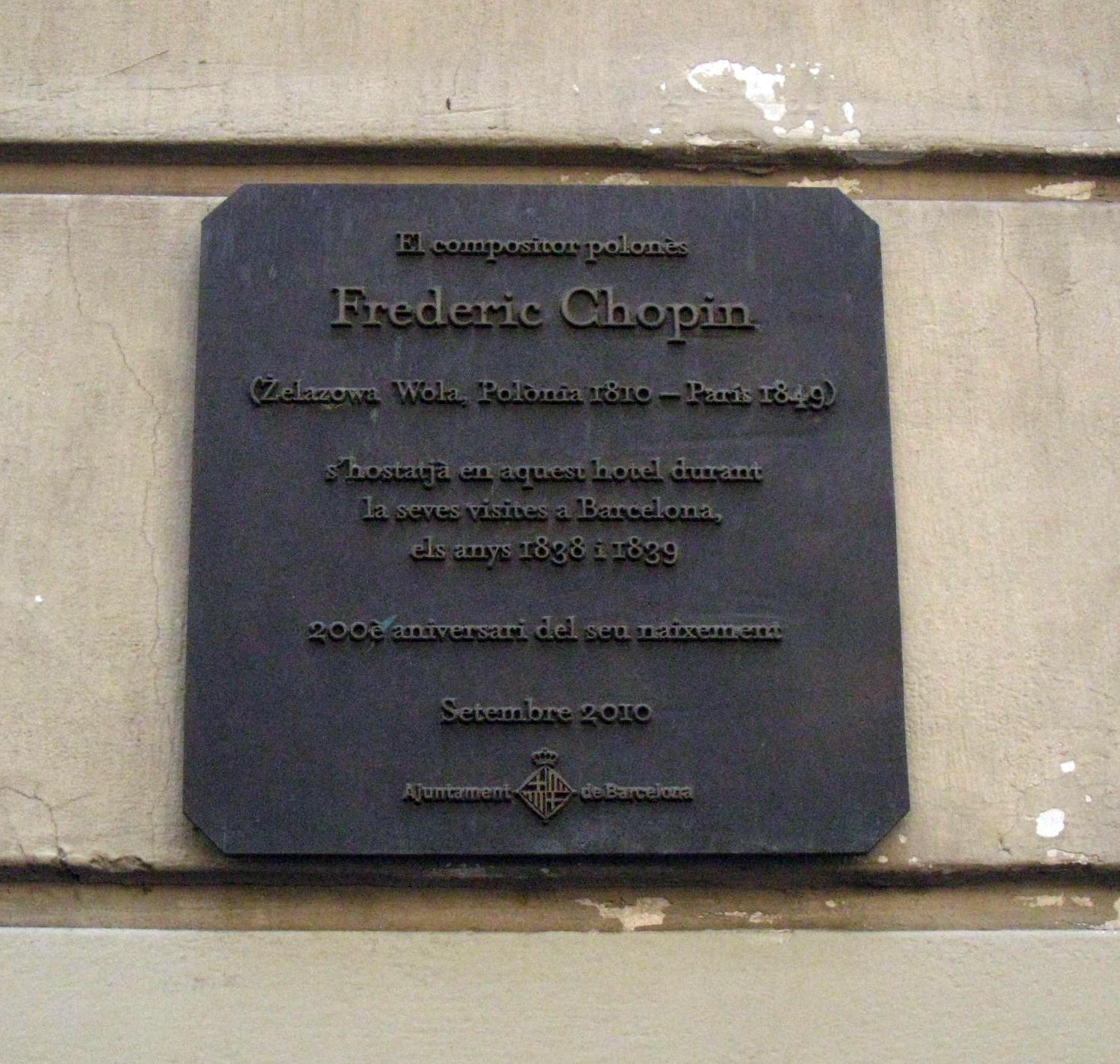
Plaque, Barcelona, Spain, commemorating Chopin's 1838 and 1839 visits

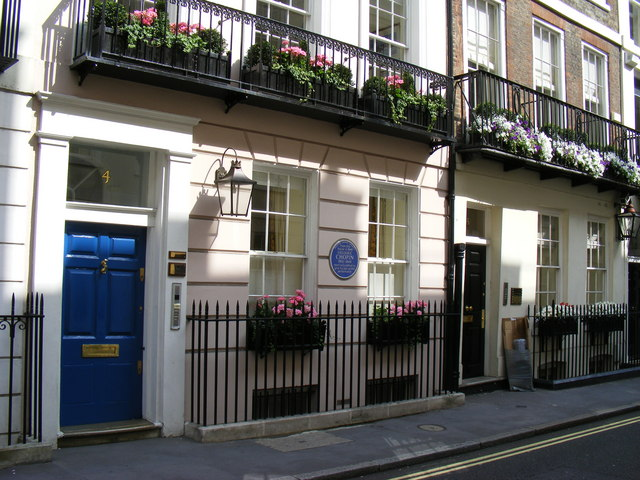
4 St. James's Place, London, whence on 16 November 1848, Chopin went to the Guildhall to give his last public performance

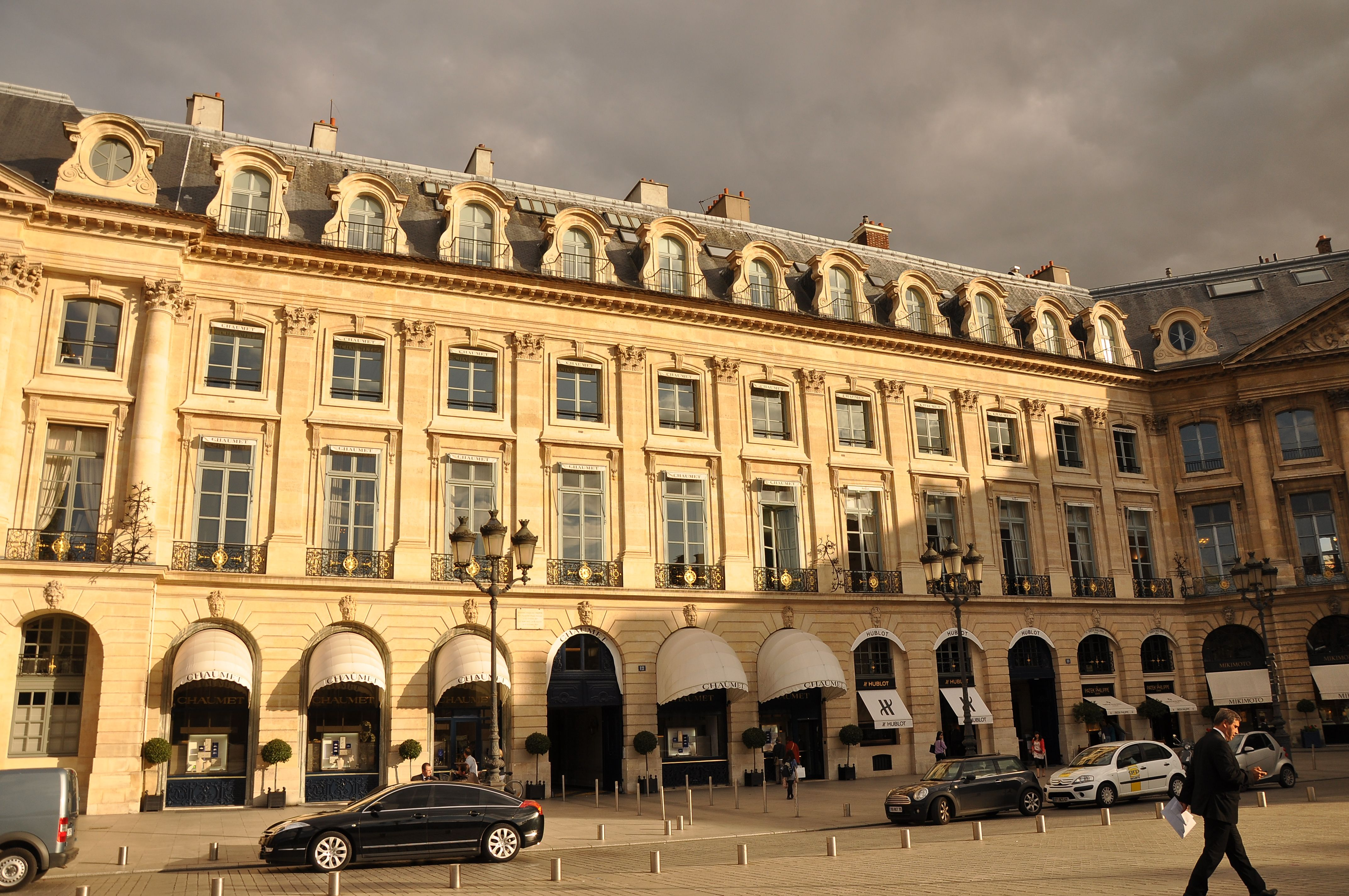
Hôtel Baudard de Saint-James (12 place Vendôme), Paris, where in 1849 Chopin died

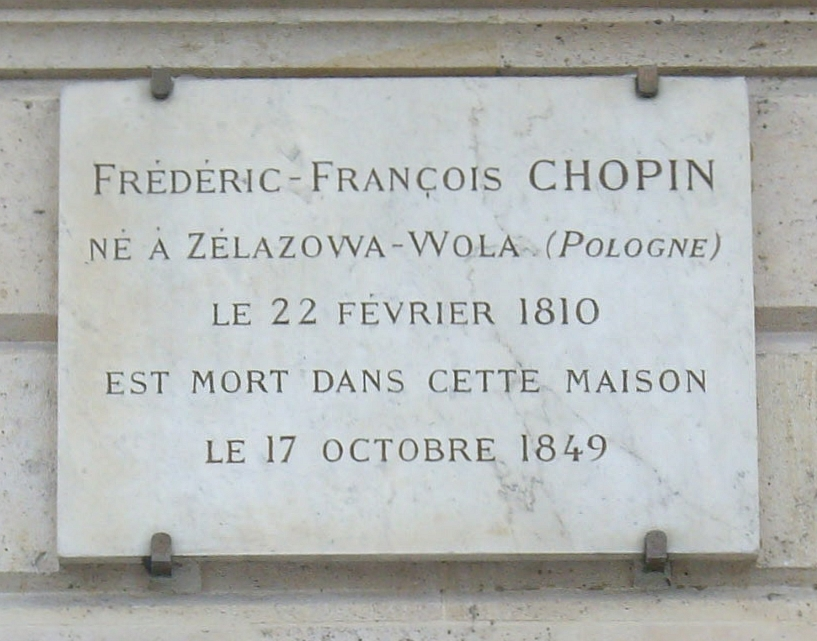
Plaque on Hôtel Baudard de Saint-James, commemorating Chopin's death there

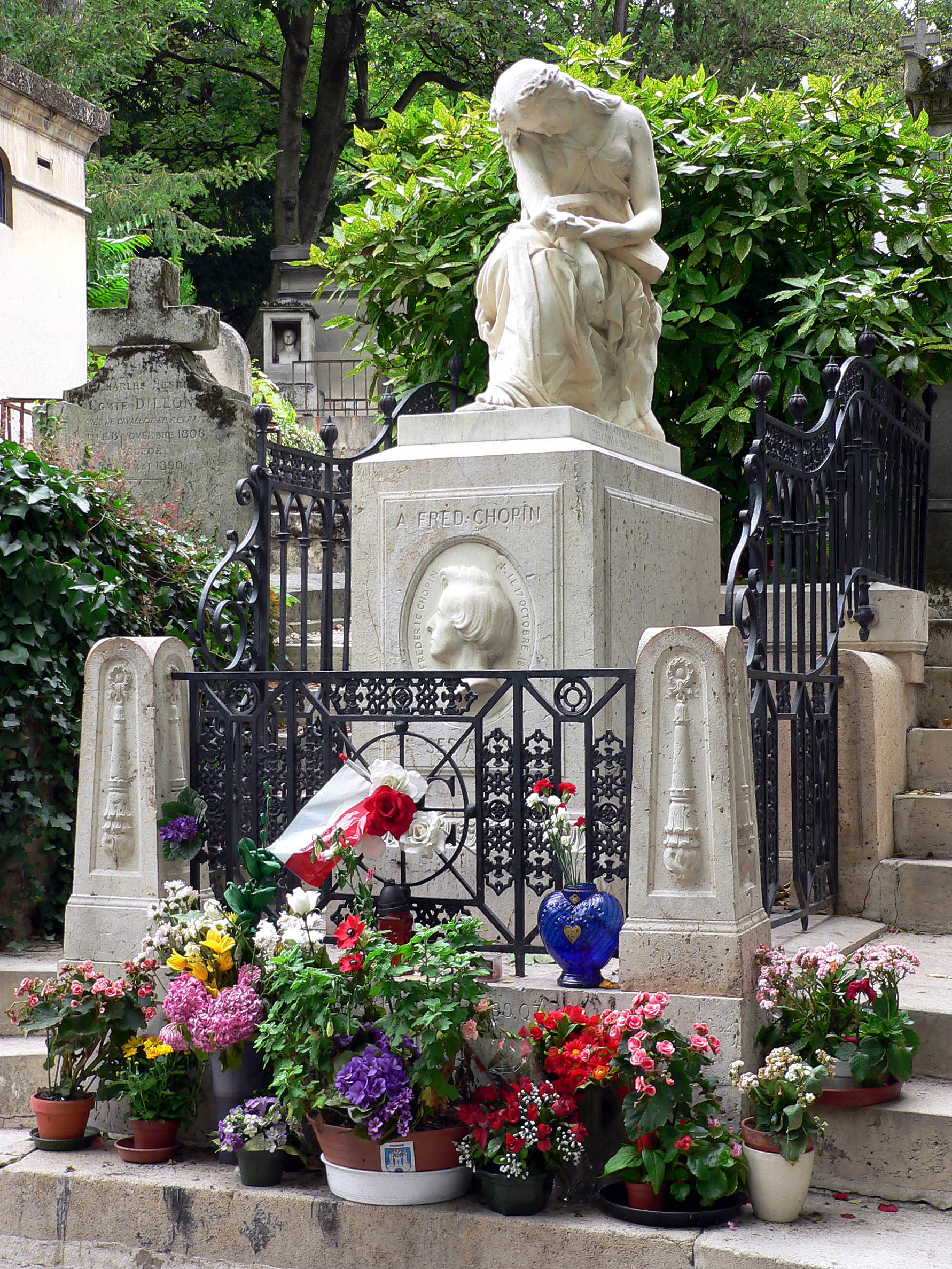
Chopin's grave, Père Lachaise Cemetery, Paris

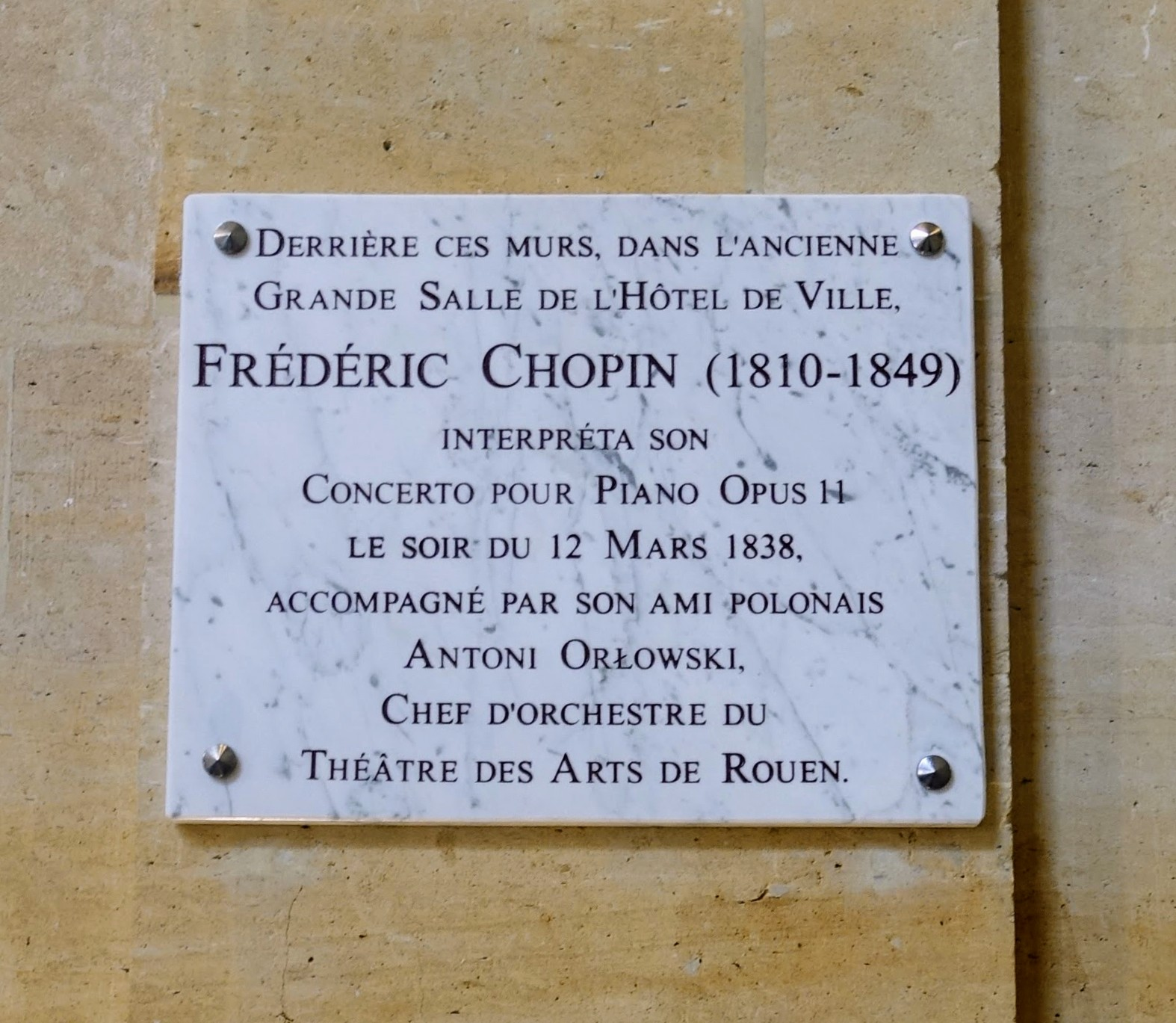
Plaque, Rouen, France, commemorating Chopin's 1838 concert for the benefit of his friend Antoni Orłowski

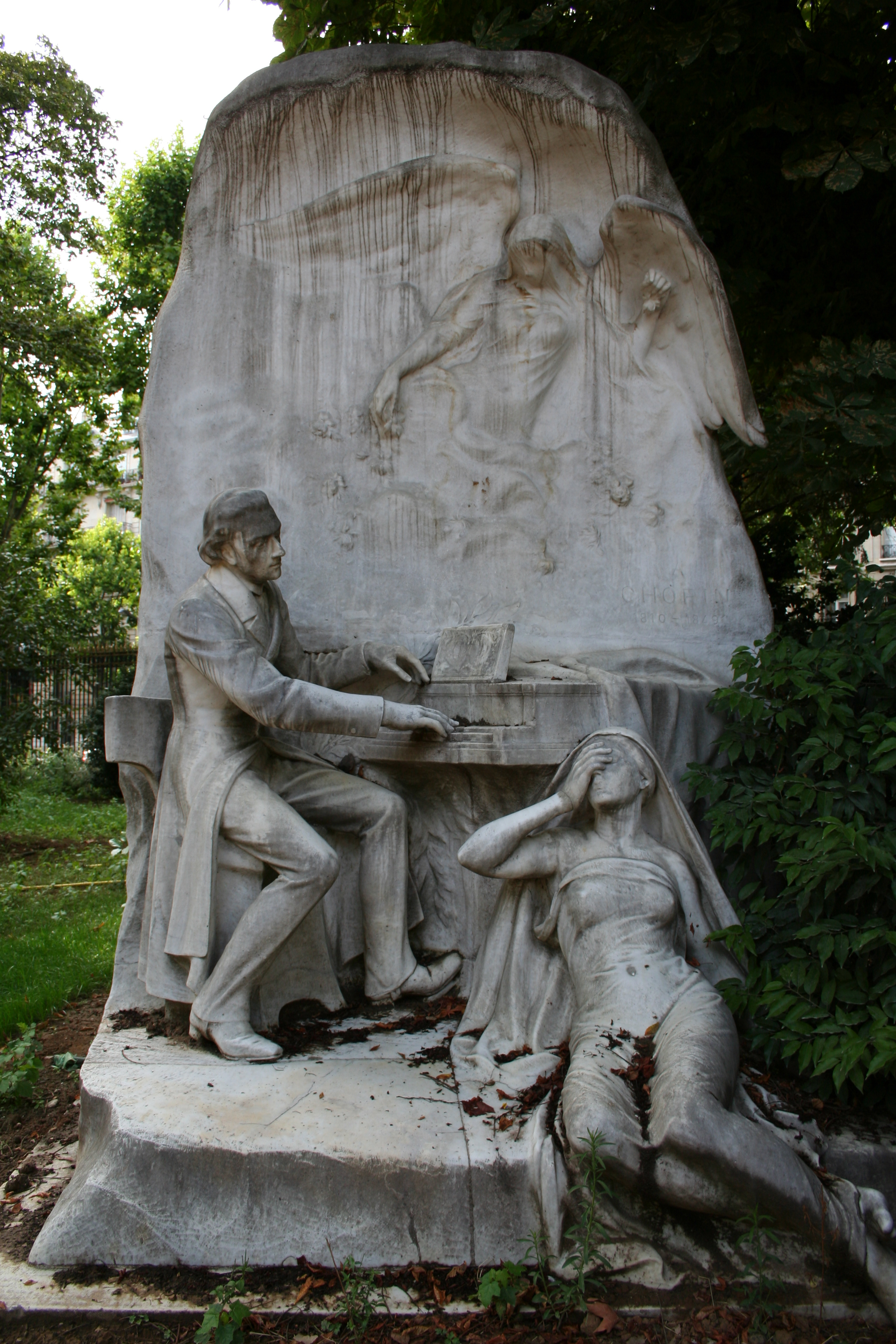
Monument, Parc Monceau, Paris

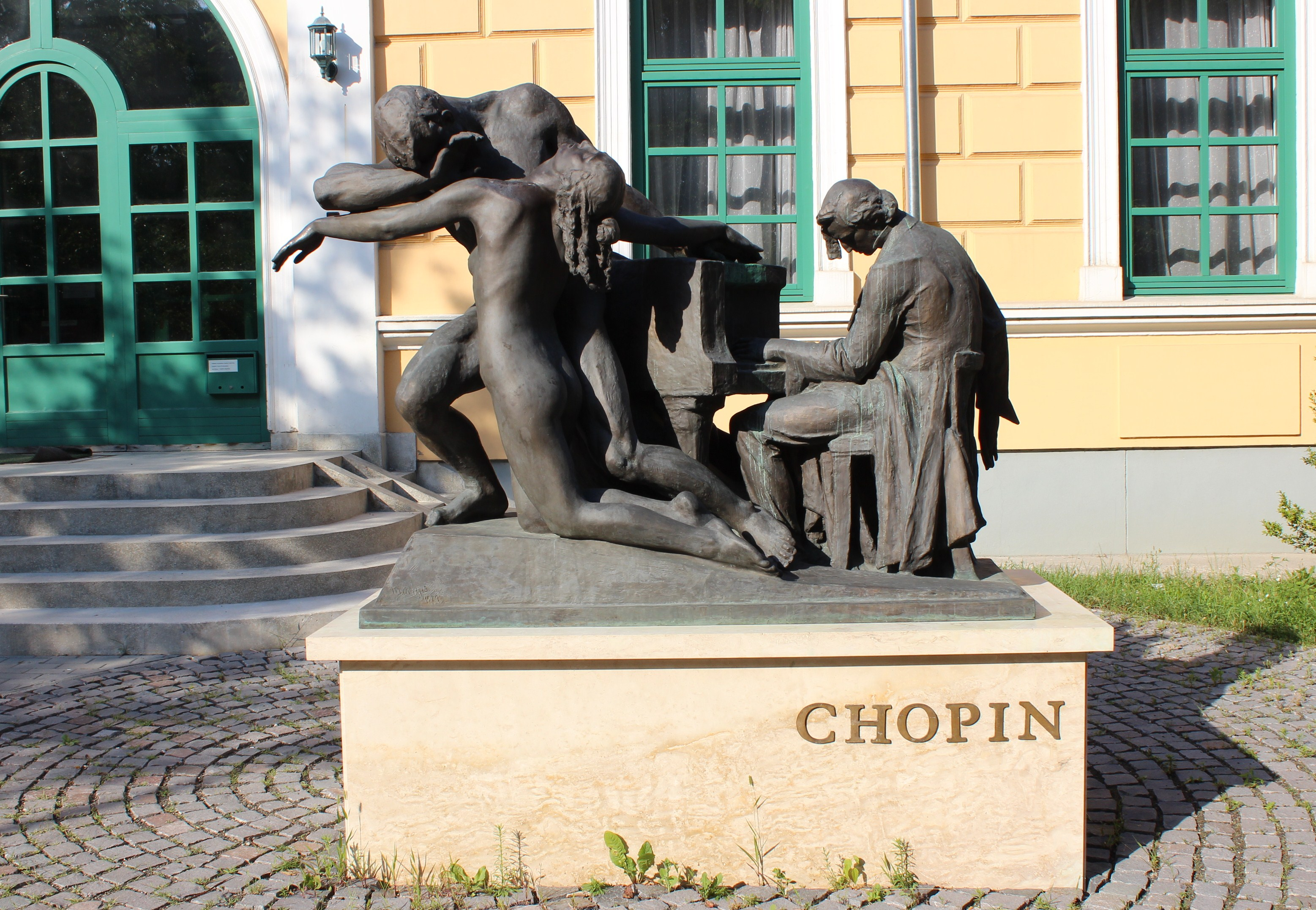
Monument, Gödöllő, Hungary

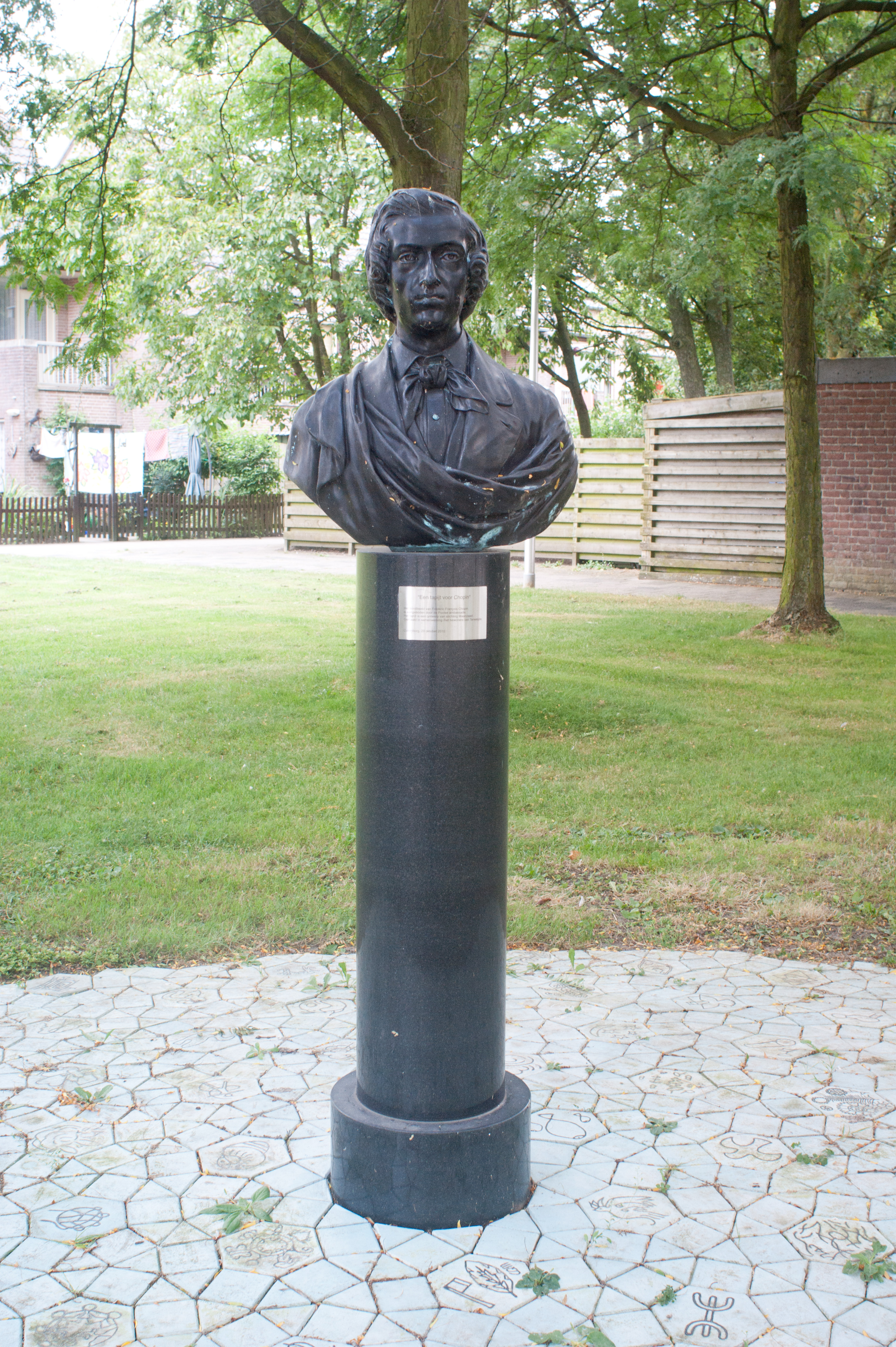
Bust, Culemborg, Netherlands

=== North America ===
- The Chopin Theatre, Chopin Park, Chopin School, and Chopin Plaza, all in Chicago, are named in the composer's honor – testimony to the influence of Chicago's Polish Community. A Chopin statue is planned for Chicago's lakefront.
- San José, Costa Rica
- Guadalajara, Mexico

=== Asia ===
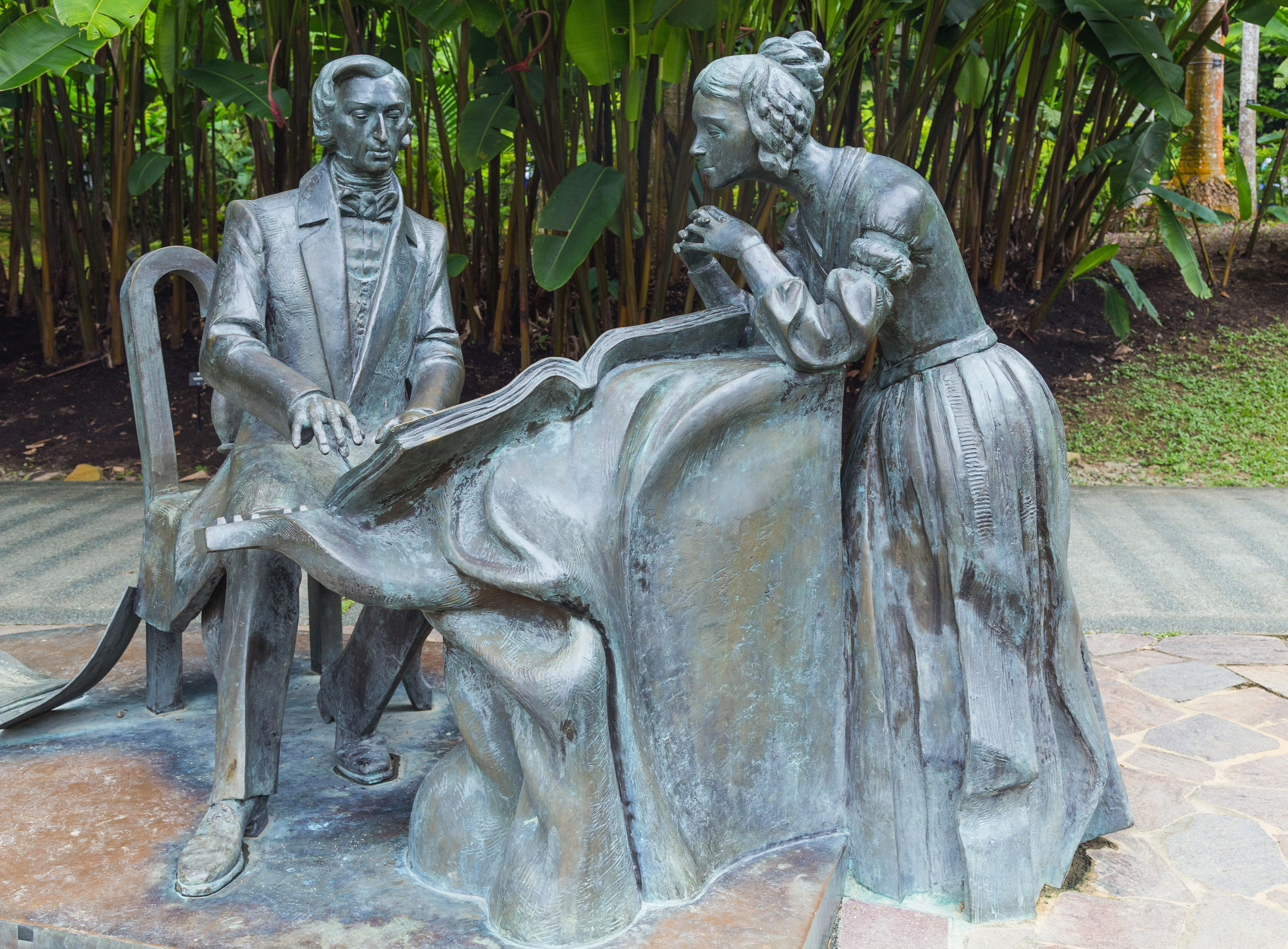
Chopin monument, Singapore Botanic Gardens, Singapore

- Hamamatsu (1994)
- Shanghai (2007)
- Singapore (2008)

=== South America ===
- Buenos Aires
- Porto Alegre
- Punta del Este
- Rio de Janeiro
- Santiago
- São Paulo

== Musical homage ==
- Sergei Lyapunov, Żelazowa Wola, Op. 37, a symphonic poem composed in 1909 to commemorate Chopin's birth centenary the following year.

== Musical institutions ==
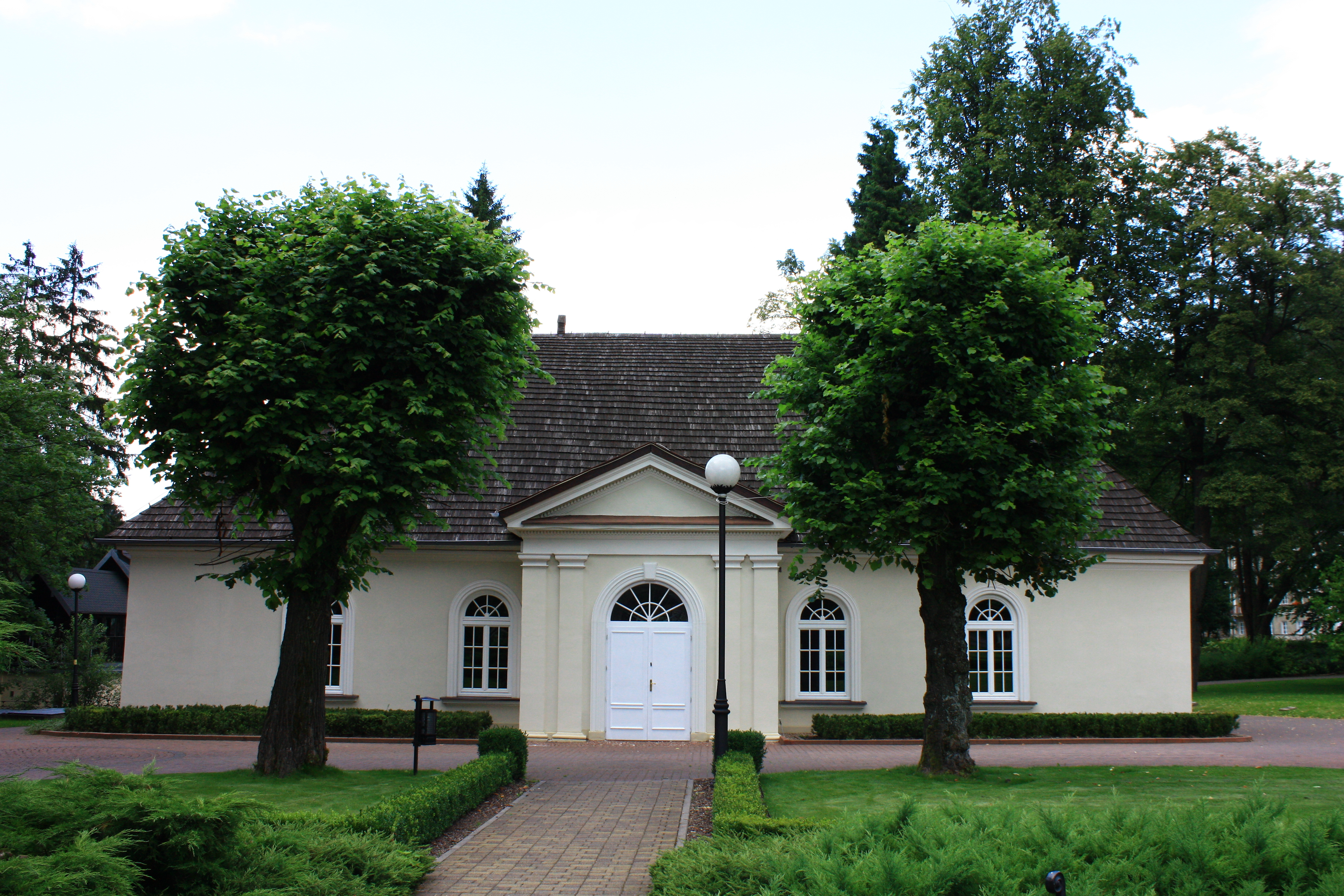
Fryderyk Chopin Theatre, Duszniki-Zdrój

- The largest Polish music conservatory is named Fryderyk Chopin University of Music.
- The world's oldest monographic music competition, the International Chopin Piano Competition, founded in 1927, is held every five years in Warsaw. Periodically, the Grand Prix du Disque de F. Chopin is awarded for notable Chopin recordings.
- The Chopin Festival, founded in 1946, is held annually in the Fryderyk Chopin Theatre in Duszniki-Zdrój.
- Fryderyk Chopin Institute, an organization dedicated to researching and promoting the life and works of Frédéric Chopin.

== Chopin societies ==
- International Federation of Chopin Societies
- Fryderyk Chopin Society, Warsaw
- Chopin Society UK

== Museums ==
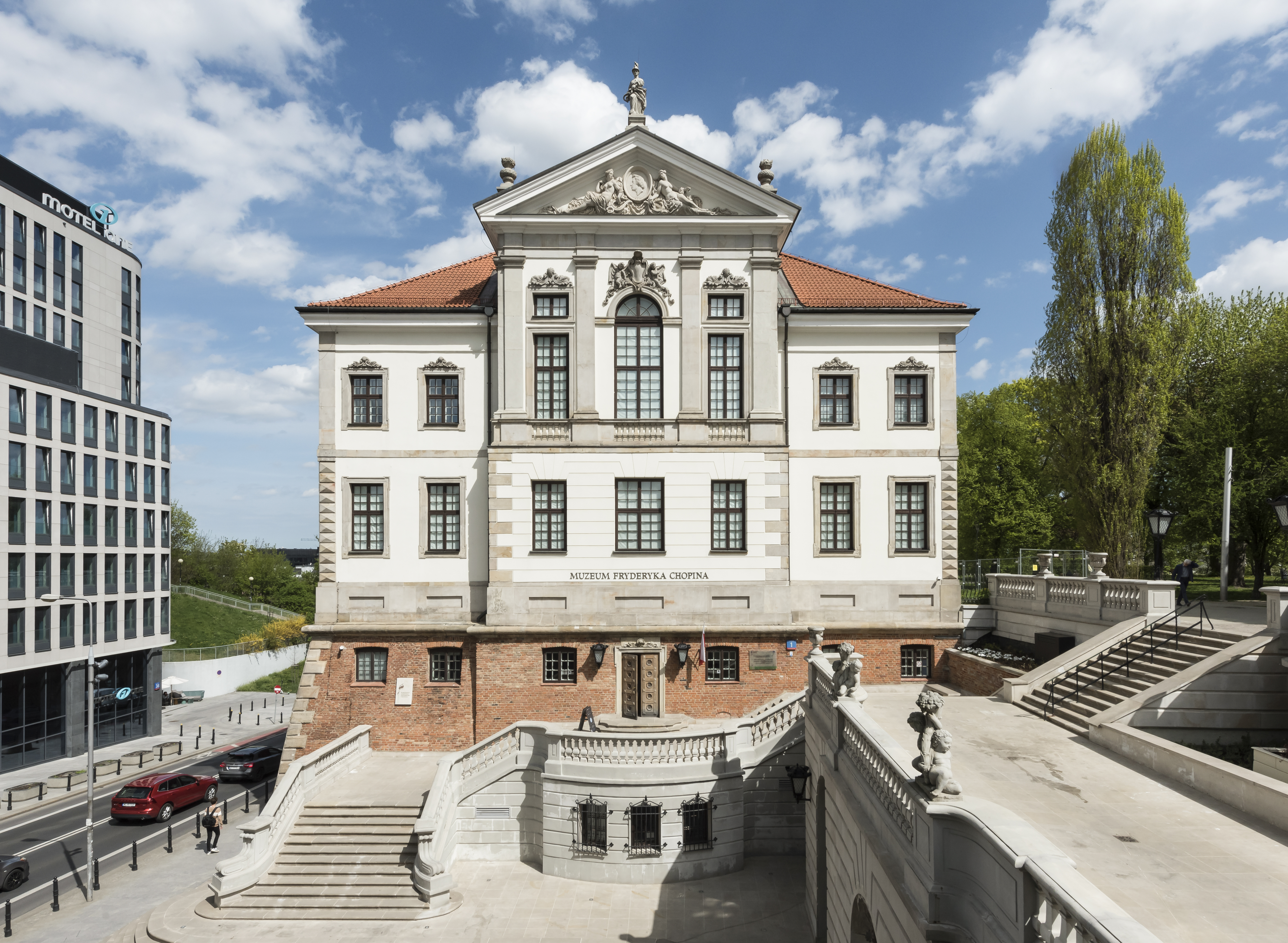
Ostrogski Palace in Warsaw, home of the Fryderyk Chopin Museum

- The Fryderyk Chopin Museum, established in 1954, is housed in Warsaw's Ostrogski Palace, the seat of the Fryderyk Chopin Society. The Museum was refurbished in 2010 for the 200th anniversary of Chopin's birth.
- Chopin's Birthplace in Żelazowa Wola is operated as a museum by the Fryderyk Chopin Museum.
- The Museum also maintains the Chopin Family Drawing Room in the Krasiński Palace, Warsaw.
- Salon Frédéric Chopin, Paris
- Cell no. 4, Valldemossa Charterhouse, Majorca - the rooms where Chopin and George Sand stayed are laid out as a museum, including Chopin's Pleyel piano.
- The Polish Library in Paris houses the only permanent exhibition dedicated to the composer in France.

== Other ==
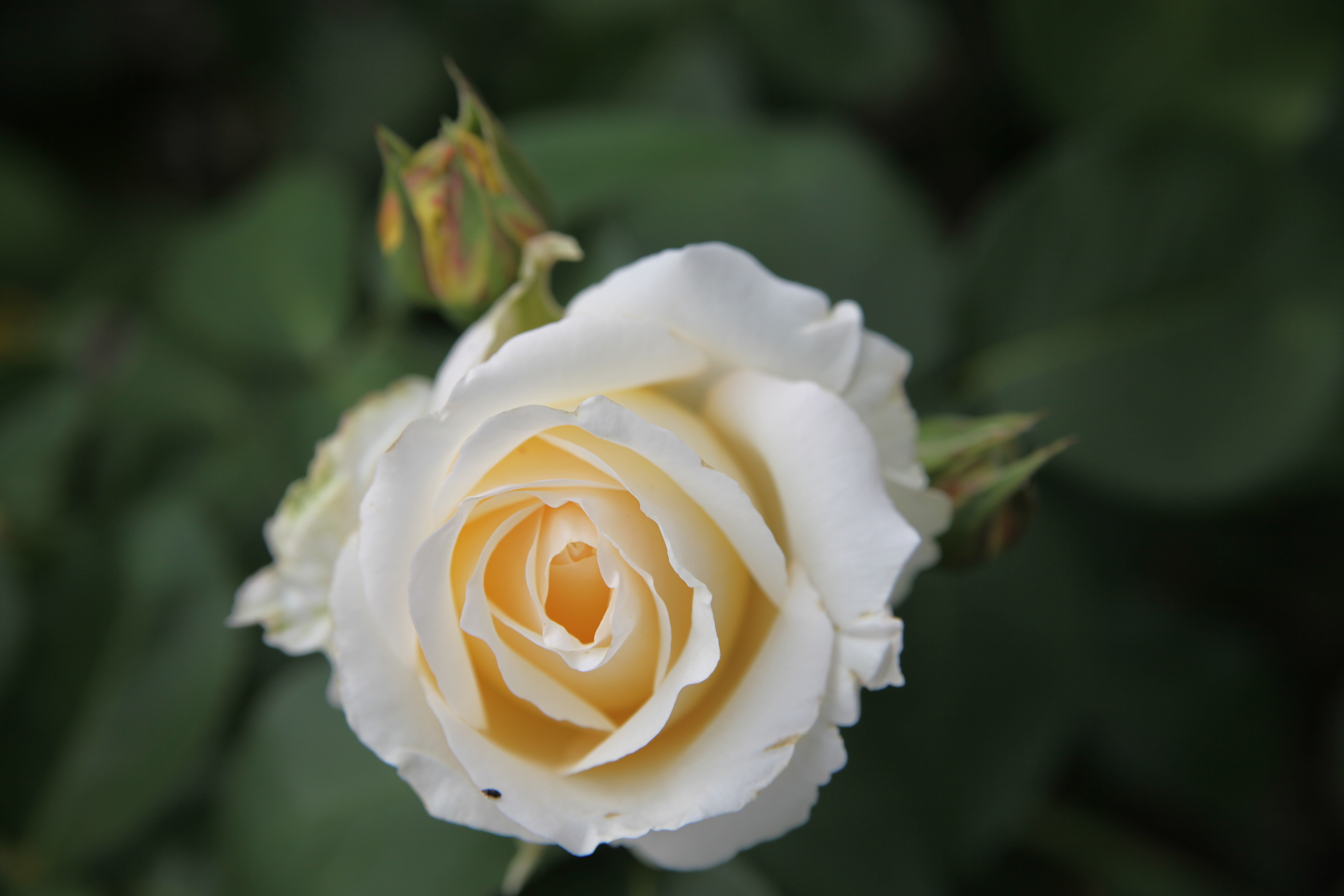
"Chopin" rose, Żyła 1980

Named for the composer are:

- Warsaw Chopin Airport (Polish: Lotnisko Chopina w Warszawie)
- Crater: Chopin on planet Mercury
- Asteroid 3784 Chopin
- Rose: "Chopin"

== Sources ==
- Samson, Jim (1998). Chopin (New paperback ed.). Oxford University Press. ISBN 9780198167037.
