= Hôtel Baudard de Saint-James =

Coordinates: 48.8669°N 2.3301°E

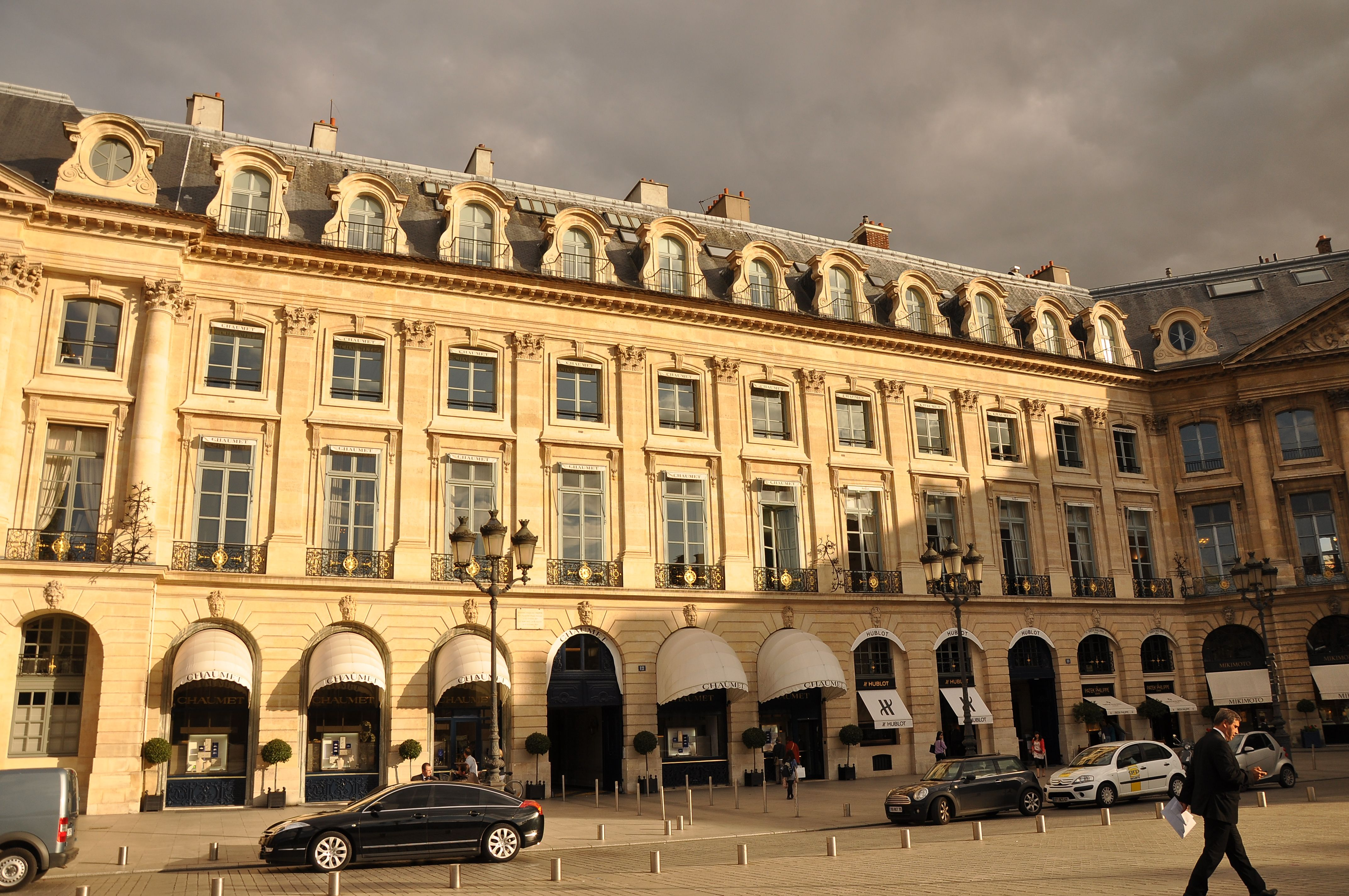
Hôtel Baudard de Saint-James

The Hôtel Baudard de Saint-James is a former hôtel particulier located at no 12, Place Vendôme in the 1st arrondissement of Paris.

== History ==
Built in 1702 for the doctor of the Sorbonne, Louis Dublineau, by the architect Jacques Gabriel, it owes its name to Claude Baudard de Saint-James, who was its second owner.

The hôtel has decorations created in 1777 by François-Joseph Bélanger and the painter Jean-Jacques Lagrenée.

In 1849, the Polish composer Frédéric Chopin died at the Hôtel Baudard de Saint-James.

It is now owned by the Crédit Foncier de France and occupied by the jeweler Chaumet.
