= Claude Baudard de Saint-James =

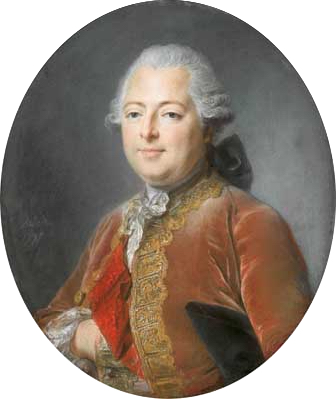
Claude Baudard de Saint-James

Claude Baudard de Saint-James (Note: James is pronounced [ʒam] and not [dʒɛms]. The name, however, comes from the anglicization of Sainte-Gemmes, a barony acquired in 1755 by the father of Claude Baudard de Saint-James.) (May 7, 1738 in Angers – July 5, 1787 in Paris), baron of Sainte-Gemmes, lord of Murs, Mont-Saint-Père, Crézancy, Gland and Chartèves, was a French financier of the 18th century.

== Biography ==
He was the son of Marguerite Baudry de La Gaucherie and Georges Nicolas Baudard de Vaudésir (cousin of Louis Baudard de Fontaine), collector of prizes at the Angers election who became general treasurer of the Colonies, he succeeded him in 1758 in the functions of general treasurer of the Navy and the Colonies and developed his father's business. He was associated with all the major industrial and financial companies of his time: the Compagnie du Nord, the Compagnie du Creusot, the Compagnie des eaux de Paris, the copper mines of Baïgorry and Decize; he held the contract to supply the navy of 150,000 to 300,000 cubic feet of lumber, associated with the Saint-Malo trader Marion-Brillantais.
