= Rosa 'Chopin' =

Rose cultivar

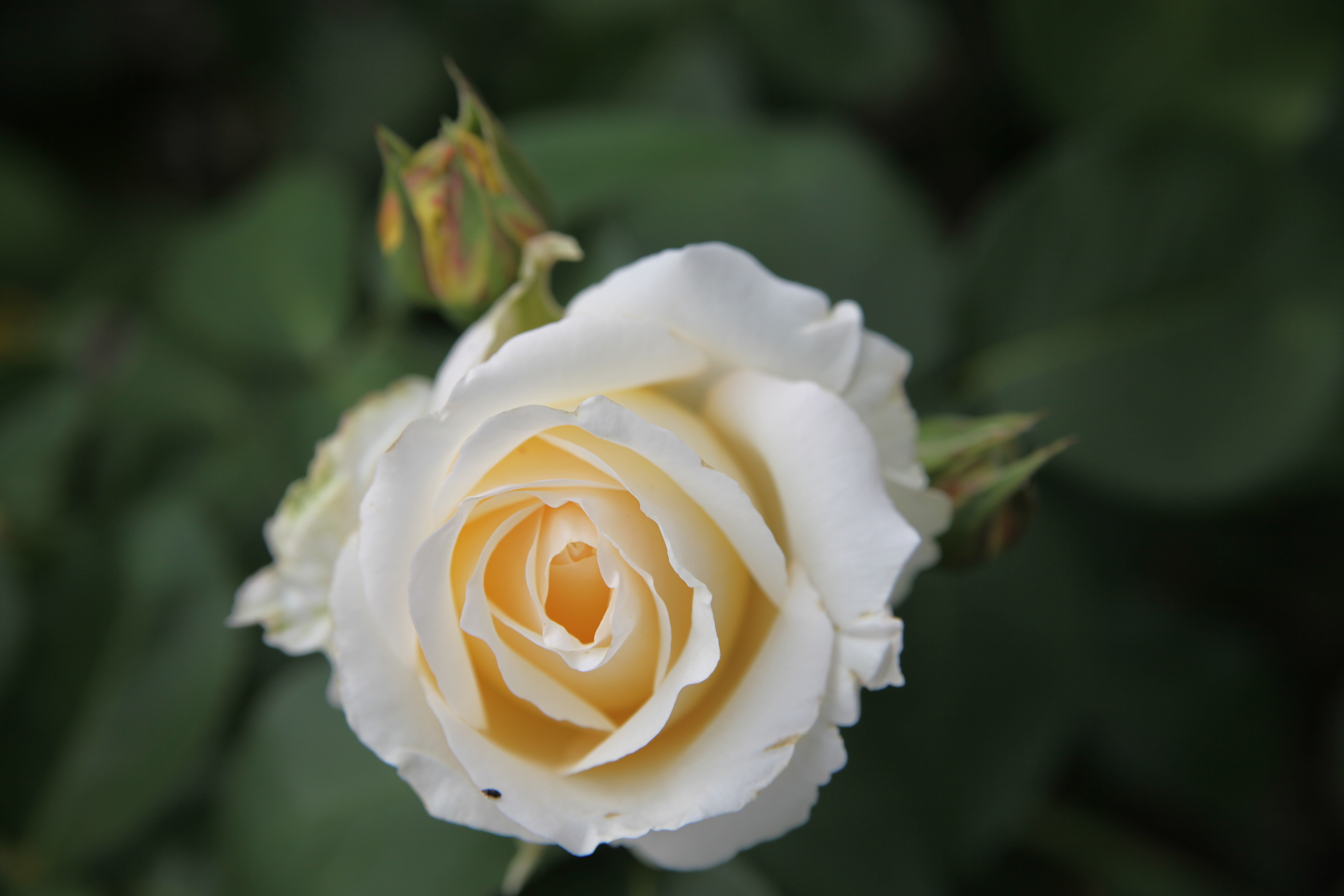
- Genus: Rosa hybrid
- Hybrid parentage: 'Crêpe de Chine' × 'Peer Gynt'
- Cultivar group: Hybrid Tea
- Cultivar: 'Chopin'
- Marketing names: 'Frederic Chopin', 'Frederyk Chopin'
- Origin: Stanisław Żyła, Poland, 1980

Rosa 'Chopin' (synonym: 'Frederic Chopin', 'Frederyk Chopin') is a rose cultivar which was introduced by Stanisław Żyła in Poland in 1980. The hybrid tea rose was bred by crossing the 'Crêpe de Chine' with the 'Peer Gynt' and is named after Polish composer Frédéric Chopin.

== Description ==
'Chopin' is a strong growing rose (150–200 cm) with showy, large flowers of light cream to pale yellow colour. Flowers have an average diameter of 5 inches (11 cm) and 17–25 petals. They grow in small clusters (3–5), have moderate fragrance and appear in flushes throughout the season. Big, leathery foliage.

The cultivar is winter hardy (USDA zone 6b – 10b) and generally disease resistant.
