= Birthplace of Frédéric Chopin =

Museum

Coordinates: 52°15′19″N 20°18′55″E

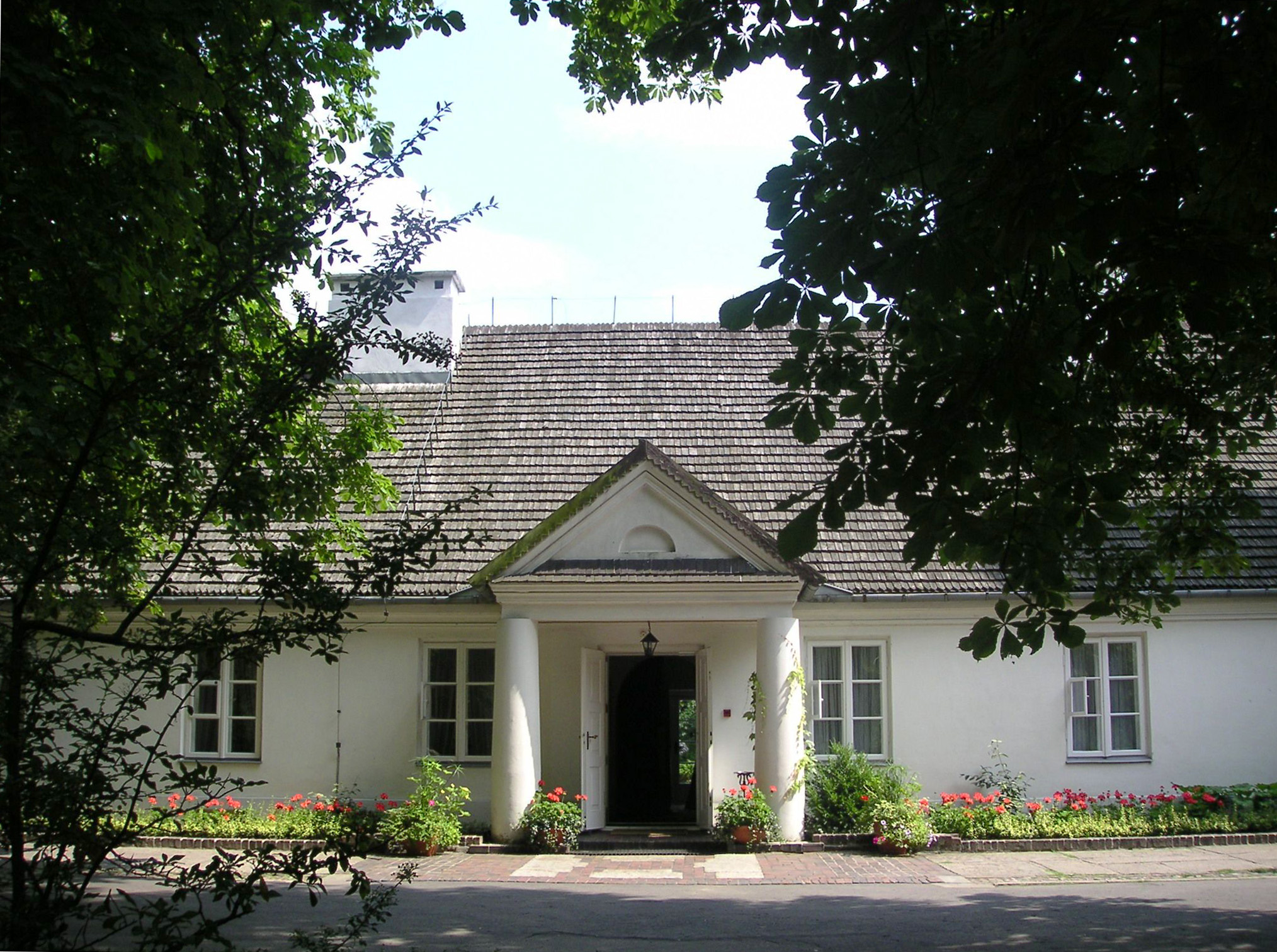
Chopin's birthplace in Żelazowa Wola

The Birthplace of Frédéric Chopin is a dworek (here, the eastern outbuilding of a now non-extant mansion) surrounded by a 17-acre natural park on the bank of the Utrata River in Żelazowa Wola, near Sochaczew in Poland—presently a biographical museum of the composer, and a department of the Fryderyk Chopin Museum in Warsaw.

== History ==
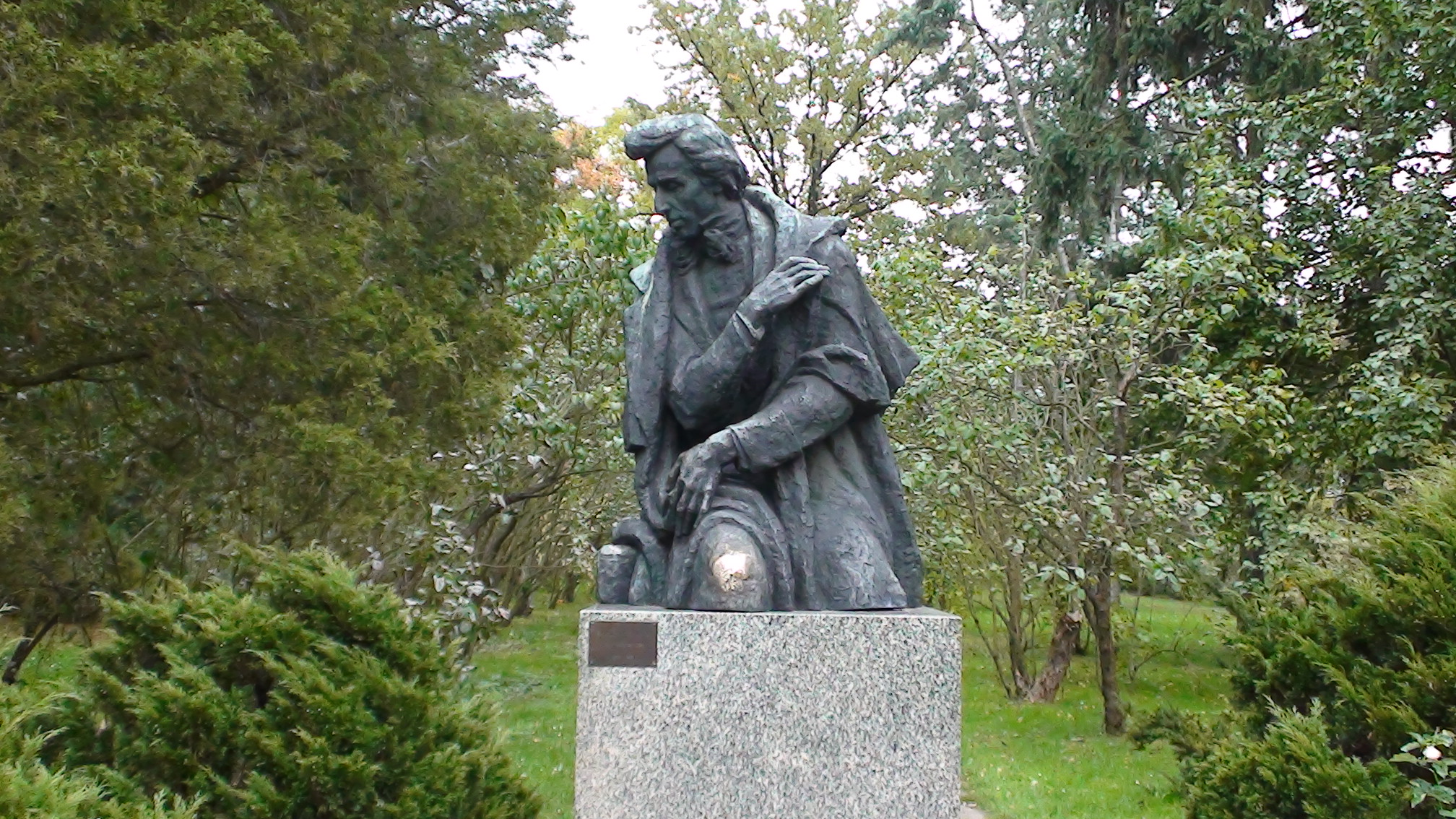
Chopin monument at Żelazowa Wola, by Józef Gosławski

The village first appears in the historical record in a 1579 document in which Mikołaj and Piotr Żelazo were mentioned as the owners of Żelazowa Wola. At the end of the 18th century the owner was Piotr Łuszczewski, followed by the Paprocki family. Eight houses comprised the village.

At the turn of the 18th and 19th centuries the village was purchased by the Skarbek family. Kacper and Ludwika Skarbek lived in a mansion bracketed by two minor outbuildings. Their children's tutor was Mikołaj Chopin, who in 1806 married Justyna née Krzyżanowska, related to the mansion's owners.

Frédéric Chopin was born here on March 1, 1810, as a second child of Chopins. All his sisters: older Ludwika Marianna, as well as two younger, Justyna Izabela and Emilia, were born in Warsaw. He did not stay in Żelazowa Wola for long (in the Fall of the same year the Chopins moved to Warsaw), but young Frédéric visited later often Żelazowa Wola, going there for vacations and family events. In 1812 Skarbek's mansion burned to the ground, but both outbuildings survived.

After the suicide of Michał Skarbek in 1834, his family sold Żelazowa Wola to Szuberts. In 1840, the ownership of the village was transferred to baron Eugehard, and soon after to the Peszel family. Later, in the years 1859–1879, Adam Towiański was an owner. His possessions consisted of granges in Mokas and Żelazowa Wola, as well as villages: Żelazowa Wola, Chodakówek, Budy Żelazowskie and Towiany. In that time there were 11 houses built of bricks 12 wooden ones, and a water mill. From 1879 the manor was owned by Aleksander Pawłowski, who used the Chopin's birthplace as a storage house.

In 1894 – on the initiative of Russian composer Mily Balakirev – the monument of Frédéric Chopin was built in park by Bronisław Żochowski and Jan Wojdyga. During the World War I the second outbuilding was burned. In 1918 the grange of Żelazowa Wola was lotted out and handed to the local farmers.

In 1928, the "Chopin House Friends Society" (pol. Towarzystwo Przyjaciół Domu Chopina) and the Chopin Committee (pol. Komitet Chopinowski) of Sochaczew purchased the house and 9 acres (36,000 m^{2}) of the ground for 40 000 zł from Roch Szymaniak, who owned the place after 1918. The house today is not how it originally was, as architect Lech Niemojewski was hired to help design the little backhouse as a picturesque manor house and to rebuild its interiors with furniture. During the World War II German troops occupied the building. In the summer of 1944, it was used as a military hospital.

Since 1969 there has been a monument to the pianist, designed by Józef Gosławski, in the park adjacent to Chopin's birthplace.

== See also ==
- List of music museums
