= Marian Goliński =

Polish politician (1949–2009)

Member of Sejm of Poland
- In office III term: 1997-10-20 – 2001-10-18; V term: 2005-10-19 – 2007-11-04; VI term: 2007-11-05 – 2009-06-11
- Constituency: 20 (Koszalin) - III term 40 (Koszalin) - V and VI term

Mayor of Szczecinek
- In office June 1990 – October 2005

Szczecinek Town Councillors
- In office 1990–1998

Personal details
- Born: 16 July 1949 Radom, Poland
- Died: 11 June 2009 (aged 59) Andrzejów Duranowski, Poland
- Party: Solidarity Electoral Action; Law and Justice
- Spouse: Jolanta Golińska

Marian Tomasz Goliński (16 July 1949 in Radom – 11 June 2009 in Andrzejów Duranowski) was a Polish politician who was a Mayor of Szczecinek (1990–2005) and a Member of the Sejm of Poland (1997–2001, 2005–2009).

== Biography ==
=== Political career ===
In the 1997 parliamentary election he joined the Sejm of the Republic of Poland (lower house of the Polish parliament) III term representing the 20th (Koszalin) district as a candidate from the Solidarity Electoral Action list.

In the 2002 local election he was a candidate for Mayor of Szczecinek. In the First Ballot he pooled 5,906 votes (43.43%). In the Second Ballot he scored 6,226 votes (52.89%) and he beat Jerzy Hardie-Douglas, candidate of POPiS local coalition.

After the 2005 parliamentary election he returned to the Sejm of Poland. In 40th district, as a candidate from the Law and Justice list, he polled 5,408 votes and was elected to the Sejm V term.

In the 2005 parliamentary election he was re-elected to the Sejm VI term, representing the 40th (Koszalin) district, as a candidate from the Law and Justice list. He polled 8,352 votes.

He died in a road accident on 11 June 2009 in Andrzejów Duranowski, near Sochaczew, Masovian Voivodeship.

=== Personal life ===
With his wife, he had four children, one son and three daughters.

== See also ==
- Members of Polish Sejm 1997-2001
- Members of Polish Sejm 2005-2007
- Members of Polish Sejm 2007-2011
