= Bogdaniec =

Bogdaniec may refer to the following places:

- Bogdaniec, Lubusz Voivodeship (west Poland)
- Bogdaniec, Masovian Voivodeship (east-central Poland)
- Bogdaniec, Warmian-Masurian Voivodeship (north Poland)
