= Wyjazd =

- Village
- Location within Poland
- Coordinates: 52°13′52″N 20°21′9″E
- Country: Poland
- Voivodeship: Masovian
- County: Sochaczew
- Gmina: Sochaczew

Wyjazd [ˈvɨjast] is a village in the administrative district of Gmina Sochaczew, within Sochaczew County, Masovian Voivodeship, in east-central Poland. It is approximately 8 km (5 mi) east of Sochaczew and 45 km (28 mi) west of Warsaw.
