= Sochaczew Narrow Gauge Railway Museum =

Polish museum

Coordinates: 52°13′02″N 20°14′14″E

- Muzeum Kolei Wąskotorowej w Sochaczewie

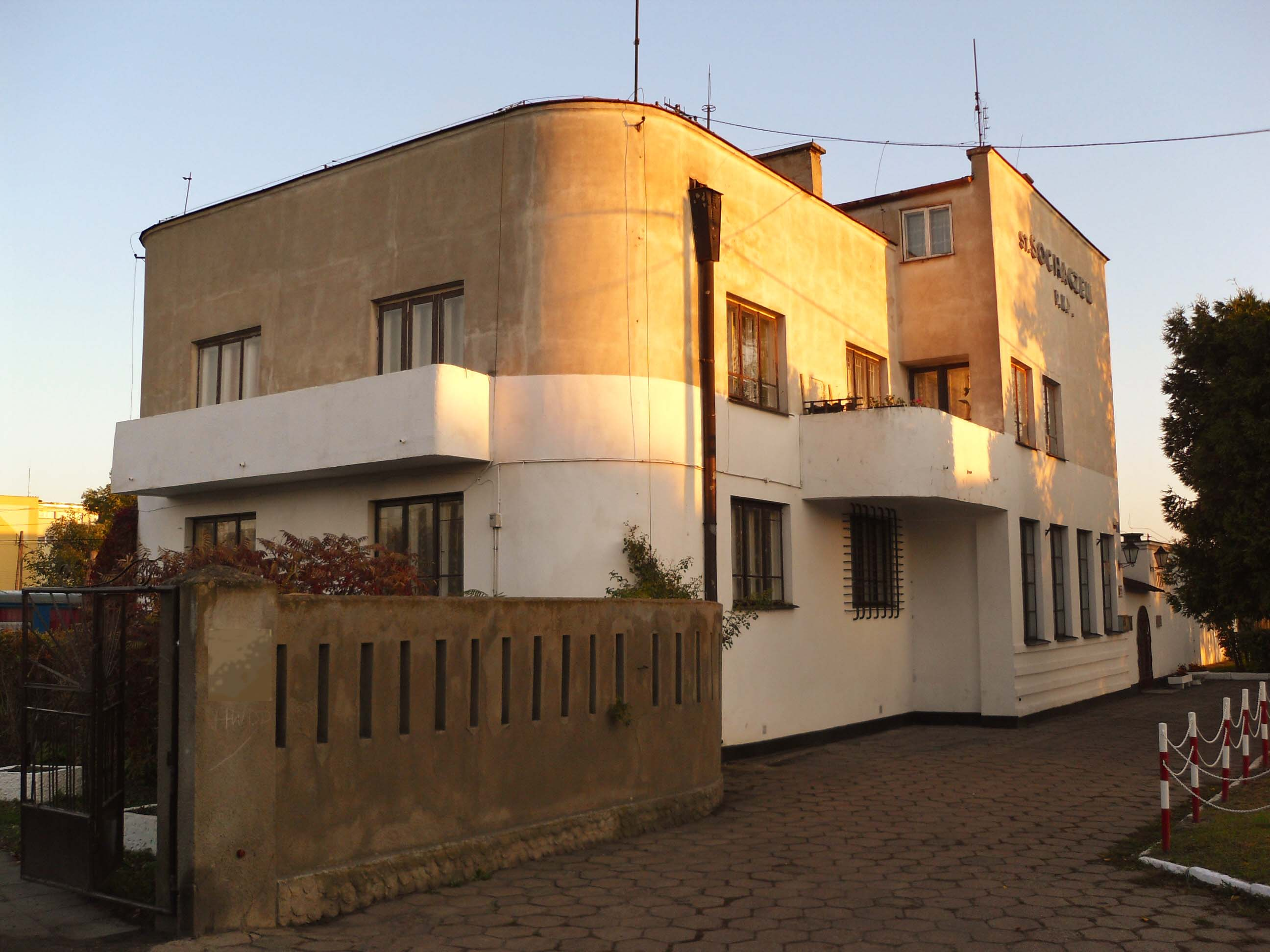
- Art deco railway station building at the museum
- Established: 6 September 1986
- Location: Sochaczew
- Type: Heritage railway
- Owner: Station Museum
- Public transit access: Sochaczew railway station
- Website: sochaczew.stacjamuzeum.pl

The Sochaczew Narrow Gauge Railway Museum (Polish: Muzeum Kolei Wąskotorowej w Sochaczewie) is a 750 mm (2 ft 5 1/2 in)-gauge heritage railway based at Sochaczew in Poland, about 50 kilometres (31 mi) west of Warsaw. The museum's headquarters are that of the former Sochaczew County Narrow Gauge Railway (Polish: Sochaczewska Kolej Powiatowa). It has a fleet of historic 750mm-gauge steam, diesel and electric locomotives, goods wagons, passenger cars and draisines. It has also a small number of standard gauge and other exhibits.

Part of the railway has been restored to service. Trains from the museum to Kampinos Forest run on Saturdays from the end of May until the mid-September and also on Wednesdays during the summer holidays.

The museum was established in 1984 and opened in 1986. It is a branch of the Railway Museum in Warsaw. Due to the uncertain status of land property and financial difficulties the future of both is uncertain.

== History ==
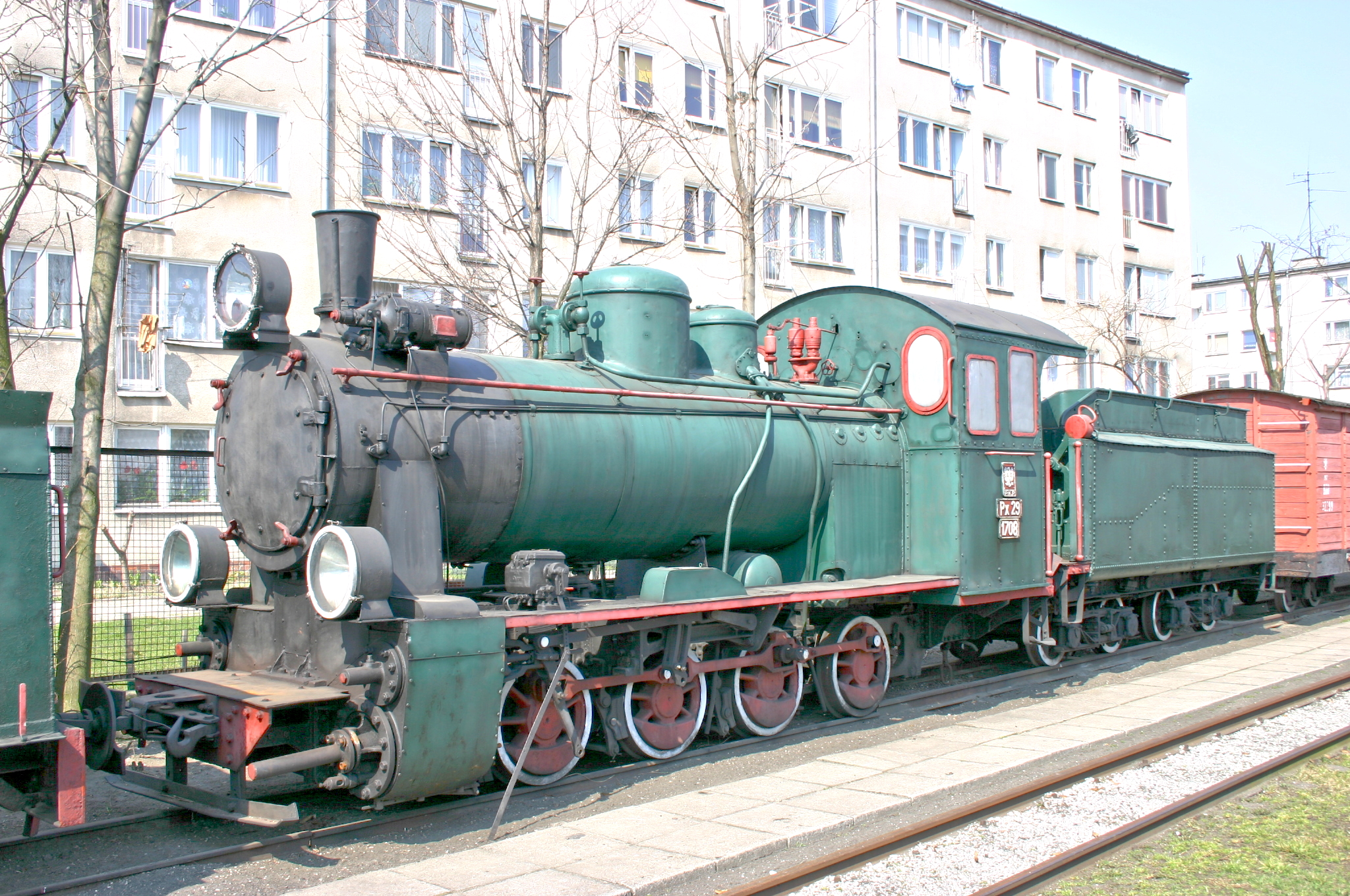
PKP Px29 class steam locomotive at the museum

Regular service of Sochaczew County Narrow Gauge Railway ended on 30 November 1984, and the museum was established in December. In the early days all efforts were made to repair, renovate and protect premises, vehicles and to do the necessary repairs of the tracks and vehicles. Preservation and repair works started. Archives and some of the exhibition rooms were placed in the station main building. Also the sheds for draisines were converted into exhibition rooms.

Sporadic train services began in May 1986. The museum was opened to the public on 6 September 1986. By the end of 1986 the museum had collected 107 vehicles, including 33 steam locomotives. In the 1996 this number reached 253. In 2009 the total number of all types of rolling stock was 263, including 56 steam locomotives. After scrapping and selling several units this number fell to 228 in 2011.

Some of the vehicles still need substantial restoration before moving from storage to display.

In the late 1980s the tracks were repaired, mainly sleepers replacements but also two bridges were fixed. On 10 July 1991 the Technical Commission of Narrow Gauge Railways (Polish: Komisja Techniczna z Zarządu Kolei Dojazdowych) granted clearance to operate the line to Wilcze Tułowskie, where the trains now terminate.

== Preserved rolling stock ==
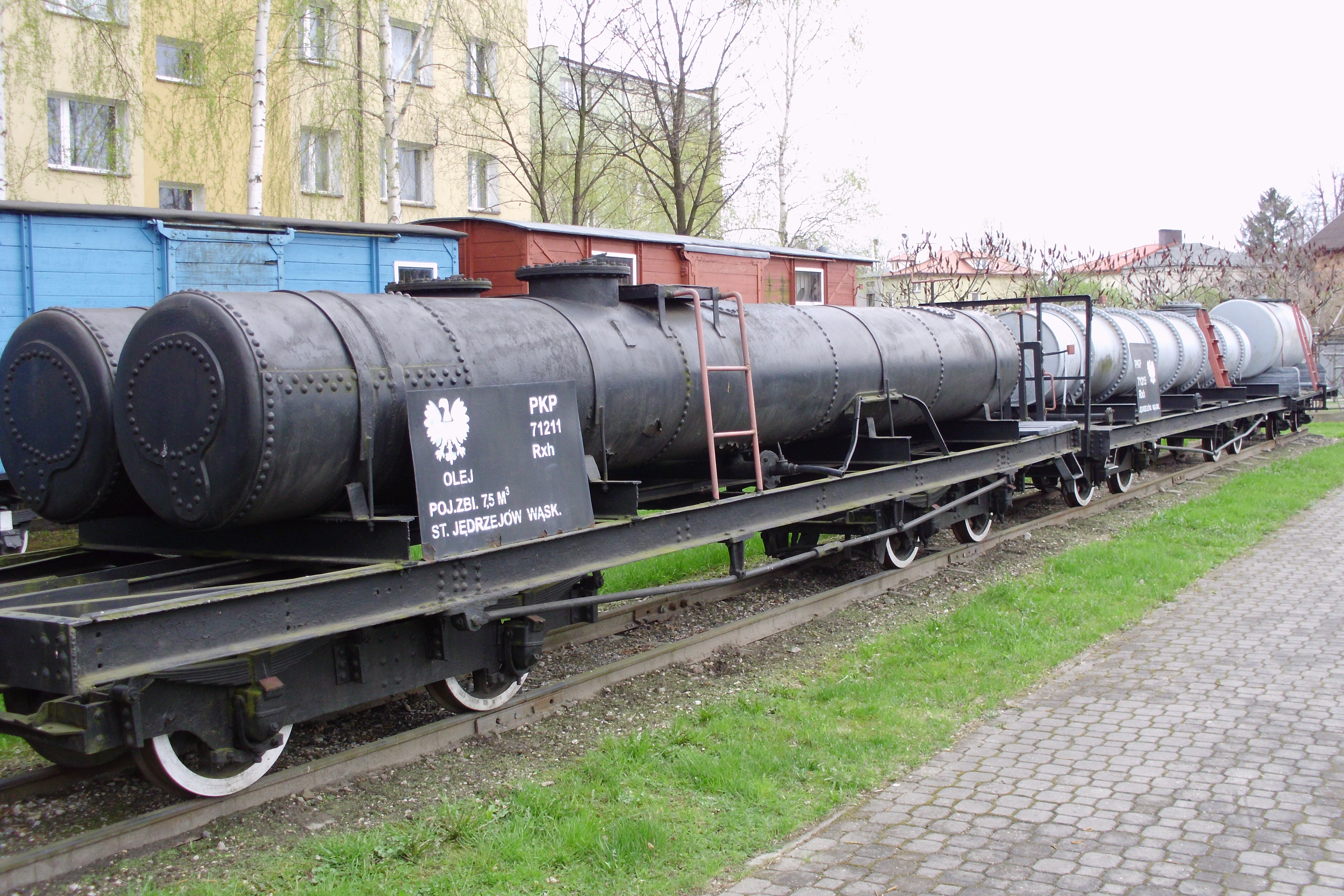
PKP bogie tank car at the museum

Steam locomotives:

- Pw53-1980
- Px29-1704 (in service)
- Px48-1755 (awaiting repair)
- Px49-1794
- Px49-1796
- Px49-1797
- Py4-741
- Tx4-1315
- Ty10914
- Tya6-3326
- Wrocław Gasworks No. 4

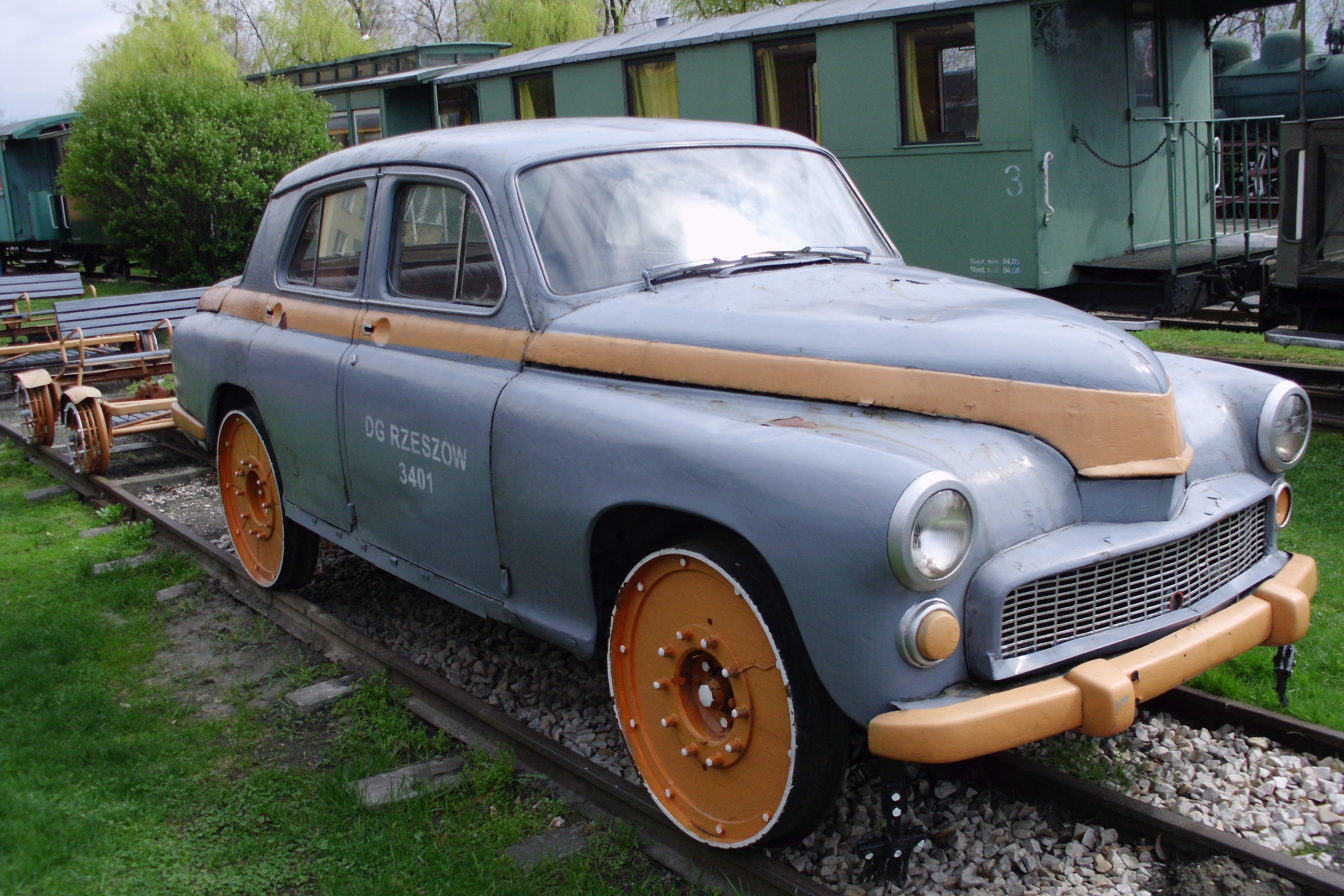
Standard gauge draisine made from a 1950s Warszawa car mounted on railway wheels

Diesel locomotives:

- Lxd2-250
- Lxd2-342
- Lyd1
- WLs75

Passenger cars

- 1Aw

== Links ==
- Muzeum Kolei Wąskotorowej w Sochaczewie – official website (in Polish)
