= Sochaczew-Wieś =

- Village
- Location within Poland
- Coordinates: 52°13′35″N 20°16′56″E
- Country: Poland
- Voivodeship: Masovian
- County: Sochaczew
- Gmina: Sochaczew

Sochaczew-Wieś (Polish pronunciation: [sɔˈxat͡ʂɛv ˈvjɛɕ]) is a village in the administrative district of Gmina Sochaczew, within Sochaczew County, Masovian Voivodeship, in east-central Poland.
