= Dachowa, Masovian Voivodeship =

Dachowa
- Village
- Location within Poland
- Coordinates: 52°13′N 20°12′E
- Country: Poland
- Voivodeship: Masovian
- County: Sochaczew
- Gmina: Sochaczew

Dachowa [daˈxɔva] is a village in the administrative district of Gmina Sochaczew, within Sochaczew County, Masovian Voivodeship, in east-central Poland.
