= Żdżarów =

- Village
- Location within Poland
- Coordinates: 52°14′N 20°10′E
- Country: Poland
- Voivodeship: Masovian
- County: Sochaczew
- Gmina: Sochaczew
- Elevation: 77 m (253 ft)
- Population: 482

Żdżarów [ˈʐd͡ʐaruf] is a village in the administrative district of Gmina Sochaczew, within Sochaczew County, Masovian Voivodeship, in east-central Poland.
