= Janaszówek =

Village in Gmina Sochaczew, Poland

- Village
- Location within Poland
- Coordinates: 52°13′50″N 20°20′34″E
- Country: Poland
- Voivodeship: Masovian
- County: Sochaczew
- Gmina: Sochaczew

Janaszówek [janaˈʂuvɛk] is a village in the administrative district of Gmina Sochaczew, within Sochaczew County, Masovian Voivodeship, in east-central Poland.
