= Czyste, Masovian Voivodeship =

Czyste
- Village
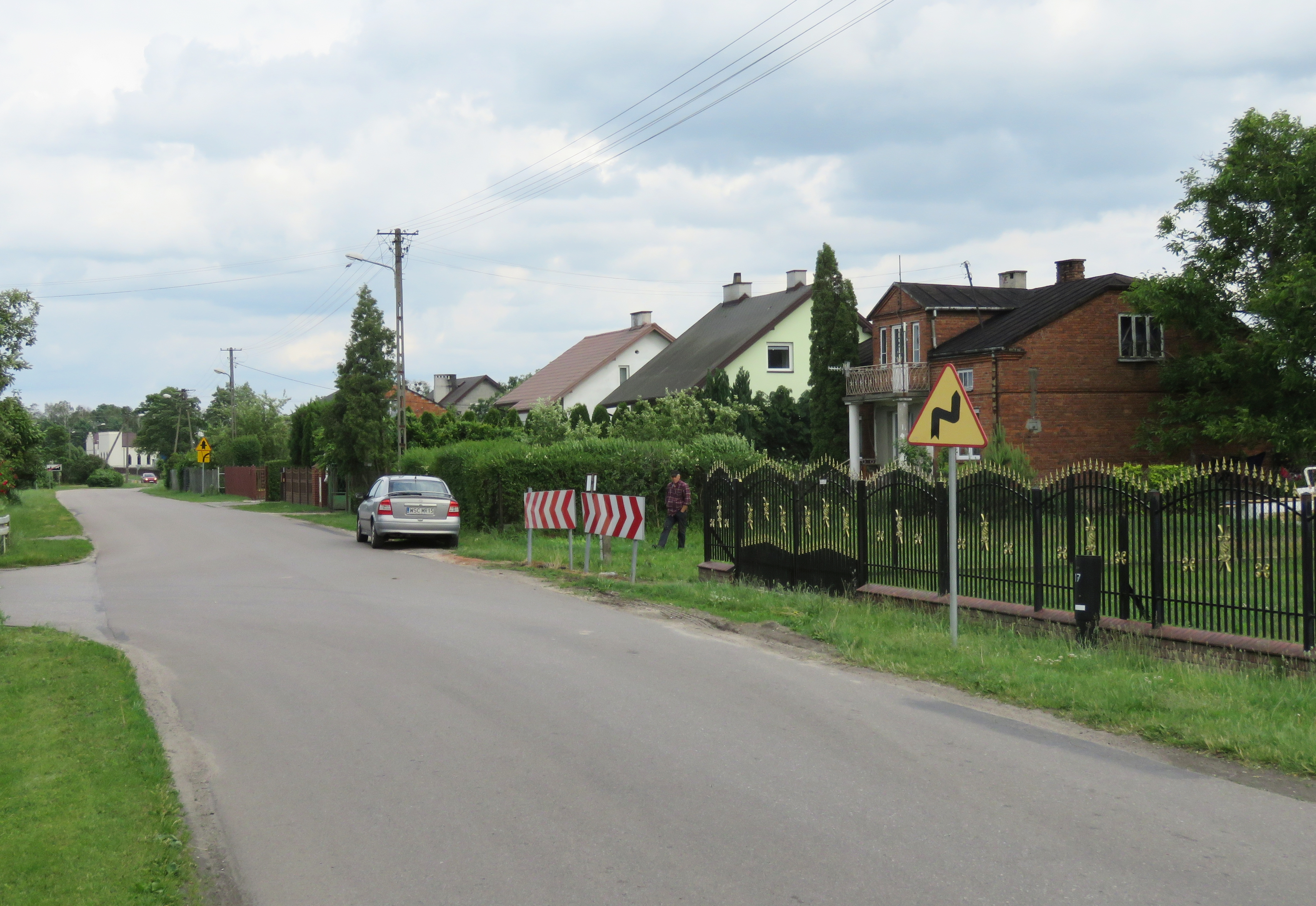
- Houses by the road

- Location within Poland
- Coordinates: 52°12′40″N 20°16′48″E
- Country: Poland
- Voivodeship: Masovian
- County: Sochaczew
- Gmina: Sochaczew

Czyste [ˈt͡ʂɨstɛ] is a village in the administrative district of Gmina Sochaczew, within Sochaczew County, Masovian Voivodeship, in east-central Poland.
