= Łubianka, Masovian Voivodeship =

Łubianka
- Village
- Location within Poland
- Coordinates: 52°15′49″N 20°13′57″E
- Country: Poland
- Voivodeship: Masovian
- County: Sochaczew
- Gmina: Sochaczew

Łubianka [wuˈbjaŋka] is a village in the administrative district of Gmina Sochaczew, within Sochaczew County, Masovian Voivodeship, in east-central Poland.
