= Czerwonka-Wieś =

- Village
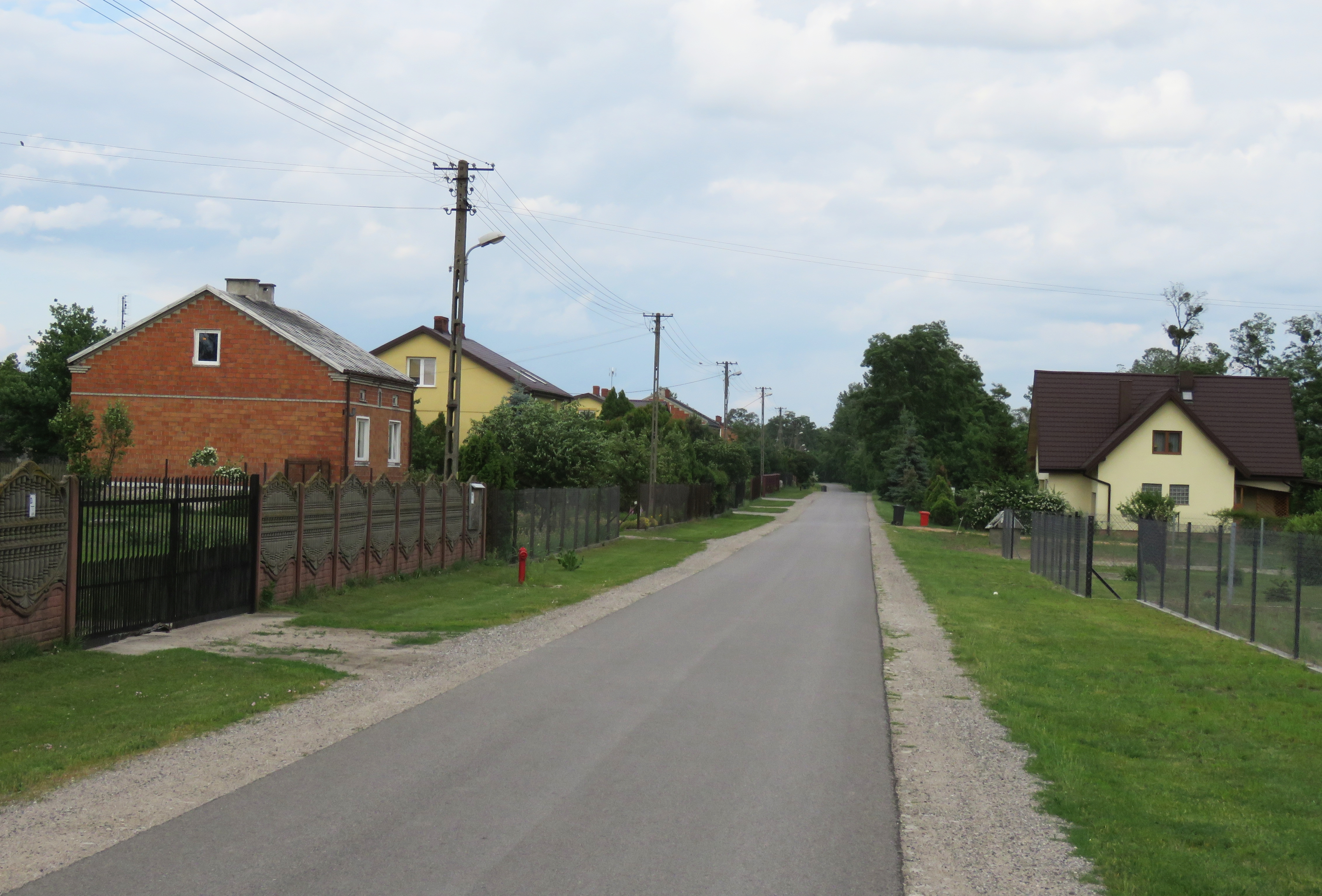

- Location within Poland
- Coordinates: 52°12′23″N 20°17′52″E
- Country: Poland
- Voivodeship: Masovian
- County: Sochaczew
- Gmina: Sochaczew

Population
  - Total: 100
- Time zone: UTC+1 (CET)
  - Summer (DST): UTC+2 (CEST)

Czerwonka-Wieś [t͡ʂɛrˈvɔnka ˈvjɛɕ] is a village in the administrative district of Gmina Sochaczew, within Sochaczew County, Masovian Voivodeship, in central Poland.
