= Ignacówka, Sochaczew County =

Ignacówka
- Village
- Location within Poland
- Coordinates: 52°12′28″N 20°17′8″E
- Country: Poland
- Voivodeship: Masovian
- County: Sochaczew
- Gmina: Sochaczew

Ignacówka [iɡnaˈt͡sufka] is a village in the administrative district of Gmina Sochaczew, within Sochaczew County, Masovian Voivodeship, in east-central Poland.
