= Feliksów, Sochaczew County =

Feliksów
- Village
- Location within Poland
- Coordinates: 52°14′21″N 20°18′59″E
- Country: Poland
- Voivodeship: Masovian
- County: Sochaczew
- Gmina: Sochaczew

Feliksów (Polish pronunciation: [fɛˈliksuf]) is a village in the administrative district of Gmina Sochaczew, within Sochaczew County, Masovian Voivodeship, in east-central Poland.
