= Dzięglewo =

- Village
- Location within Poland
- Coordinates: 52°15′45″N 20°19′02″E
- Country: Poland
- Voivodeship: Masovian
- County: Sochaczew
- Gmina: Sochaczew
- Population: 343

Dzięglewo [d͡ʑɛnˈɡlɛvɔ] is a village in the administrative district of Gmina Sochaczew, within Sochaczew County, Masovian Voivodeship, in central Poland.
