= Zosin, Masovian Voivodeship =

Zosin
- Village
- Location within Poland
- Coordinates: 52°13′39″N 20°18′51″E
- Country: Poland
- Voivodeship: Masovian
- County: Sochaczew
- Gmina: Sochaczew

Zosin [ˈzɔɕin] is a village in the administrative district of Gmina Sochaczew, within Sochaczew County, Masovian Voivodeship, in east-central Poland.
