= Orły-Cesin =

- Village
- Location within Poland
- Coordinates: 52°14′49″N 20°17′33″E
- Country: Poland
- Voivodeship: Masovian
- County: Sochaczew
- Gmina: Sochaczew

Orły-Cesin [ˈɔrwɨ ˈt͡sɛɕin] is a village in the administrative district of Gmina Sochaczew, within Sochaczew County, Masovian Voivodeship, in east-central Poland.
