= Sochaczew =

Town in Masovian Voivodeship, Poland

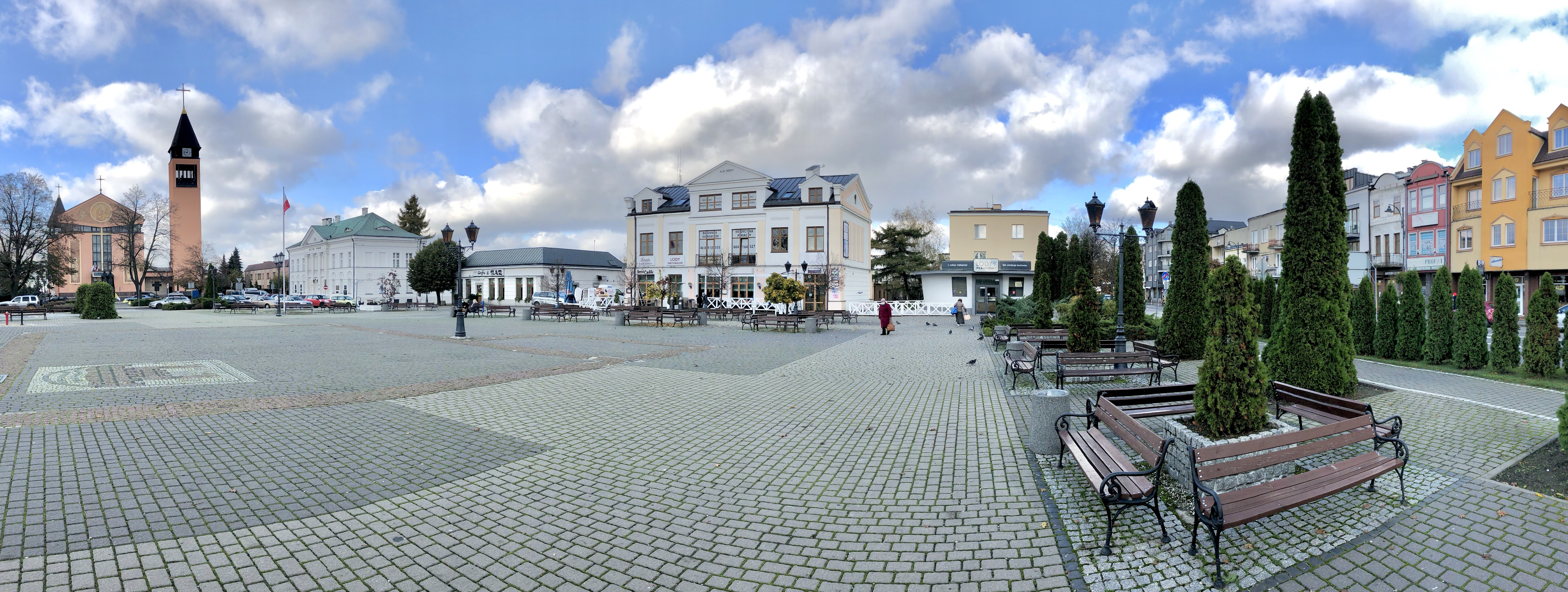
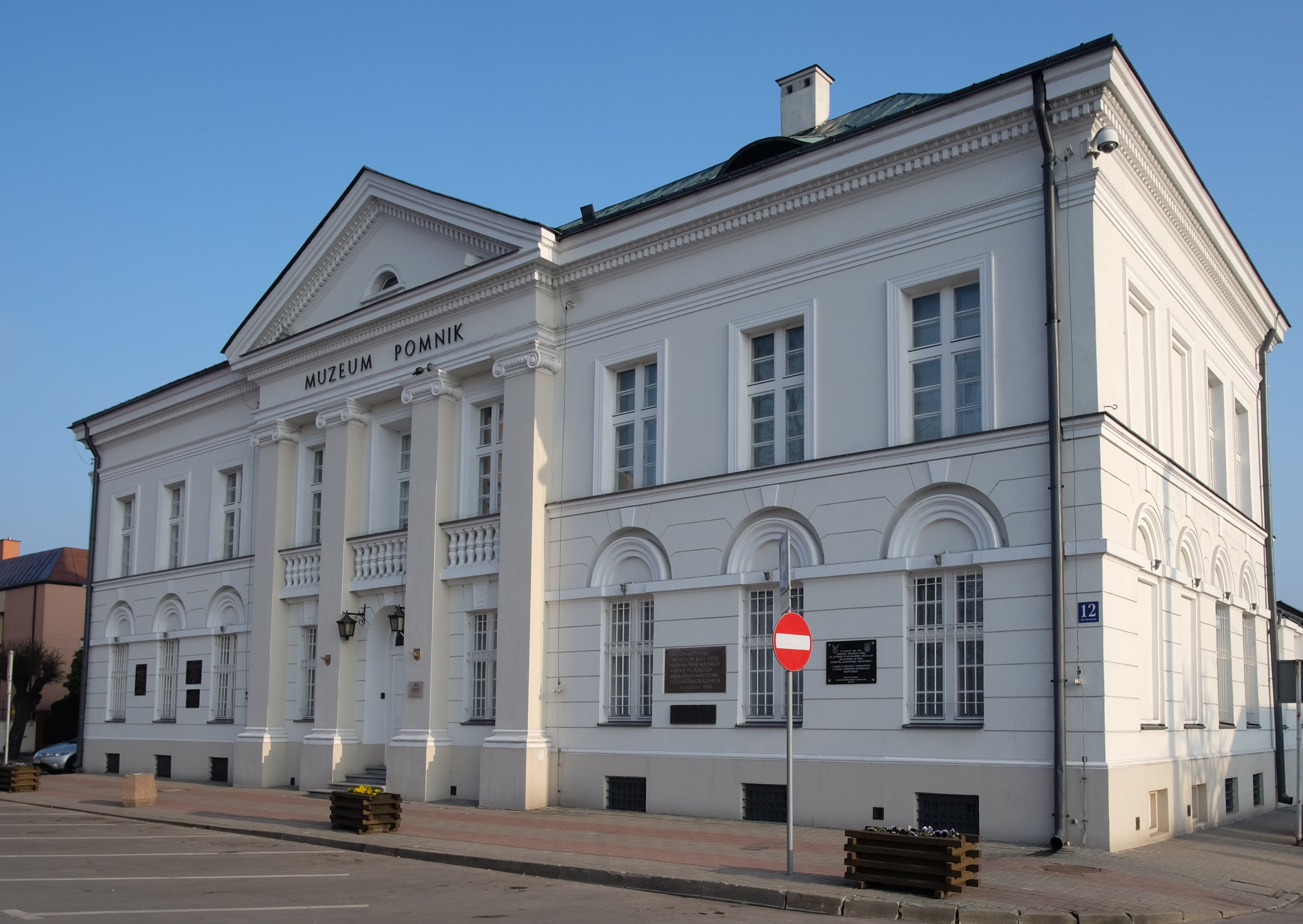
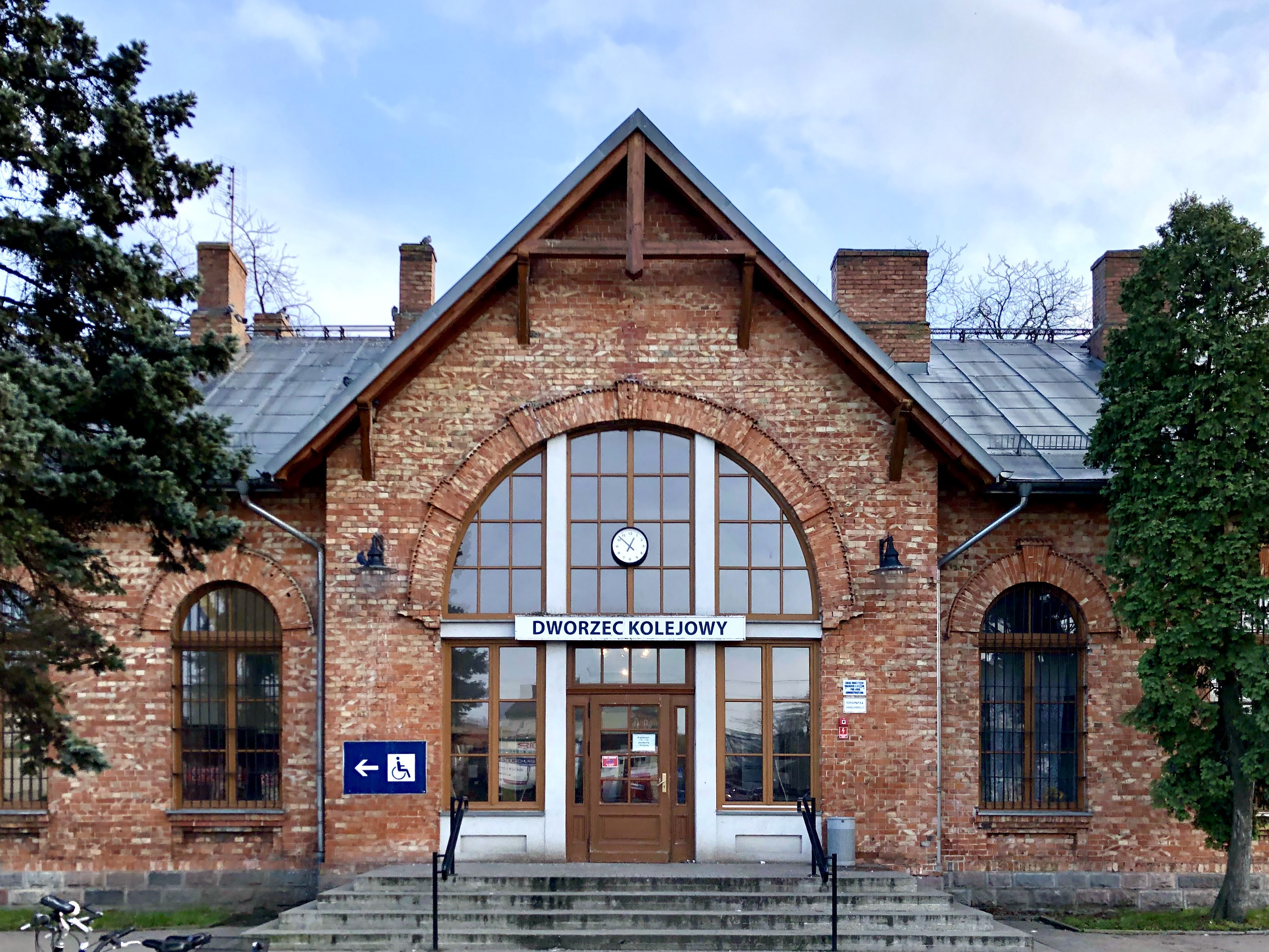
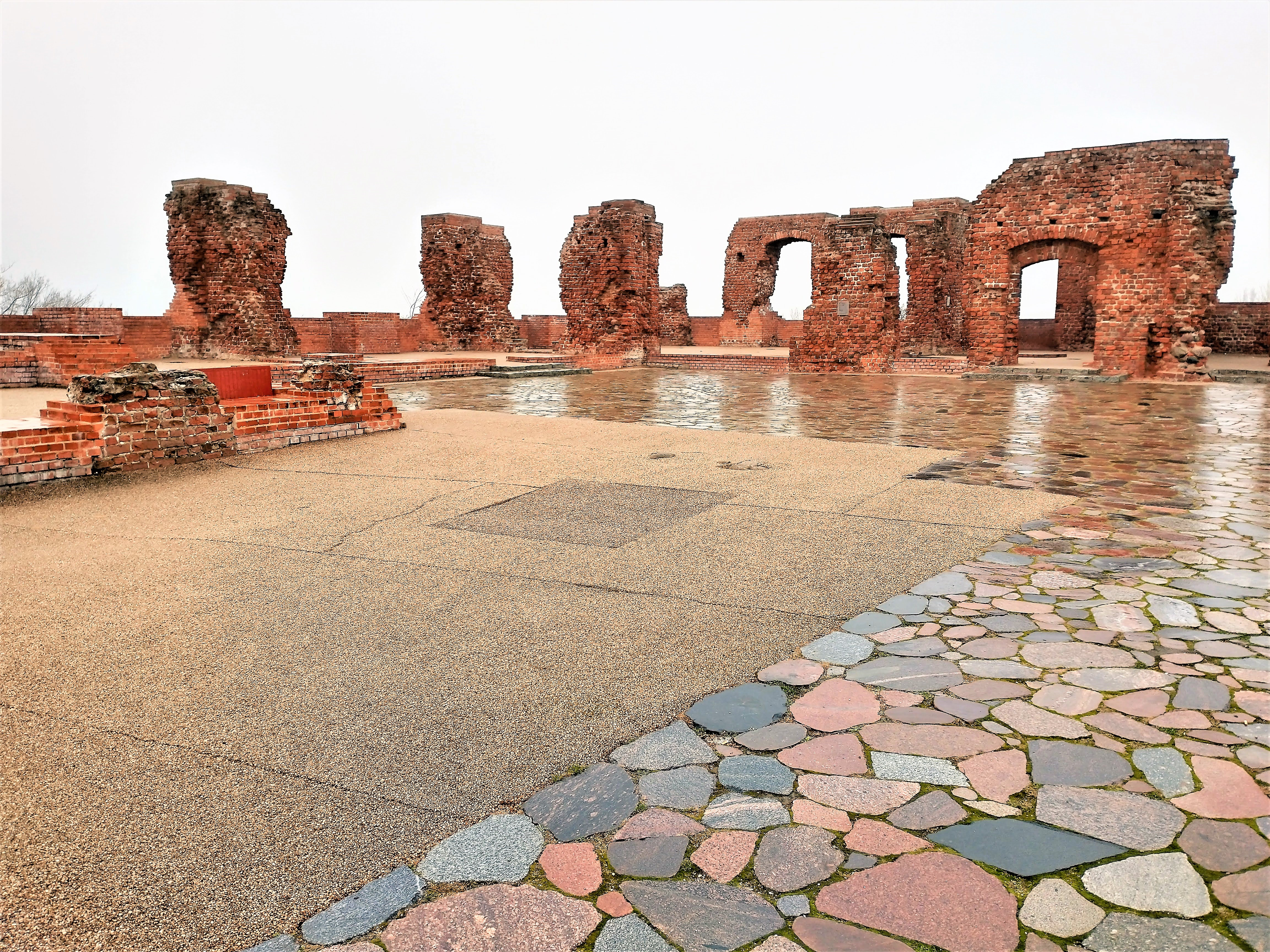
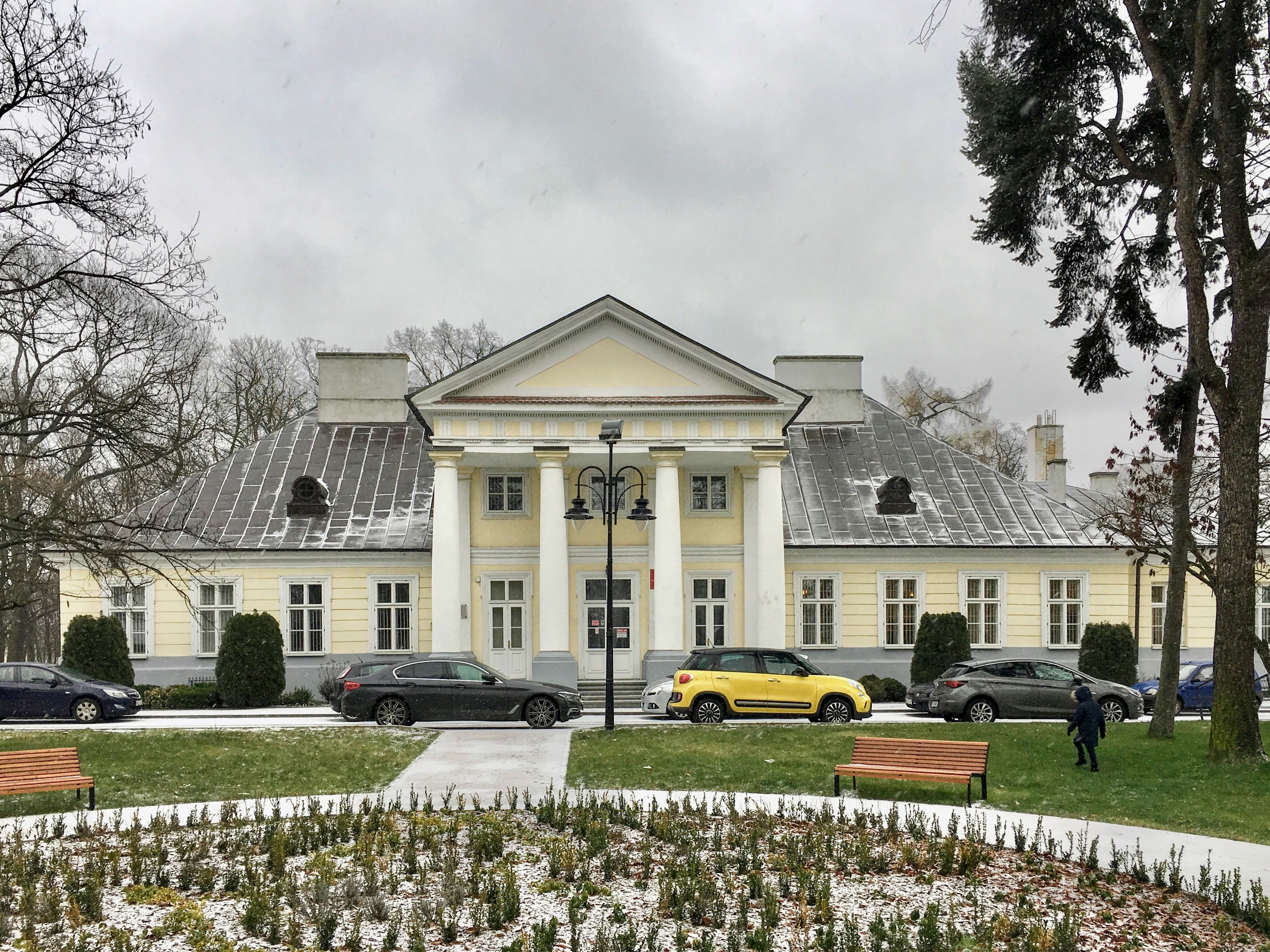
- Kościuszko Square Historic museum Main railway station Medieval castle ruins Music school

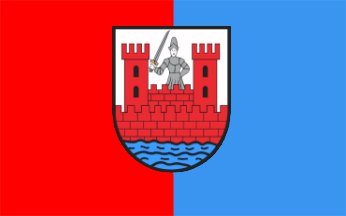
- Flag Coat of arms
- Interactive map of Sochaczew
- Location within Poland
- Coordinates: 52°14′N 20°14′E
- Country: Poland
- Voivodeship: Masovian
- County: Sochaczew
- Gmina: Sochaczew (urban gmina)
- First mentioned: 1138
- Town rights: before 1368

Government
  - Mayor: Daniel Janiak (Ind.)

Area
  - Total: 26.13 km^{2} (10.09 sq mi)
- Elevation: 81 m (266 ft)

Population (2023)
  - Total: 33,456
  - Density: 1,280/km^{2} (3,316/sq mi)
- Time zone: UTC+1 (CET)
  - Summer (DST): UTC+2 (CEST)
- Postal code: 96-500 to 96-503
- Area code: +48 46
- Vehicle registration plates: WSC
- Website: www.sochaczew.pl

Sochaczew (Polish pronunciation: [sɔˈxat͡ʂɛf]) is a town in central Poland, with 33,456 inhabitants (as of 2023). It is the capital of Sochaczew County within the Masovian Voivodeship and is located approximately 50 km (31 mi) west from the capital of Poland Warsaw.

Founded in the medieval period, Sochaczew was a royal town of Poland, which prospered from trade and crafts. In the 18th century, it was located on the Royal Route connecting Warsaw with Poznań and Dresden, and now it is located on the main railway connecting Warsaw with Poznań and the German-Polish border.

Sochaczew has a narrow-gauge railway museum with a line that runs as far as Wilcze Tułowskie. 750 mm-gauge steam trains run on the line on Saturdays from spring to the end of summer. The birthplace of Frédéric Chopin is located near the town.

== History ==
=== Early history ===
Sochaczew was first mentioned in documents from 1138, when the Duke of Poland Bolesław III Wrymouth died at a local Benedictine monastery. By 1221 Sochaczew had already been an important center of administration, and a seat of a castellan, who lived in a defensive gord. The town prospered due to its location at the intersection of main merchant routes (from Kalisz to Ciechanów, and from Warsaw to Poznań). In the first half of the 13th century, construction of two churches began; both were completed and consecrated by the Bishop of Płock in 1257.

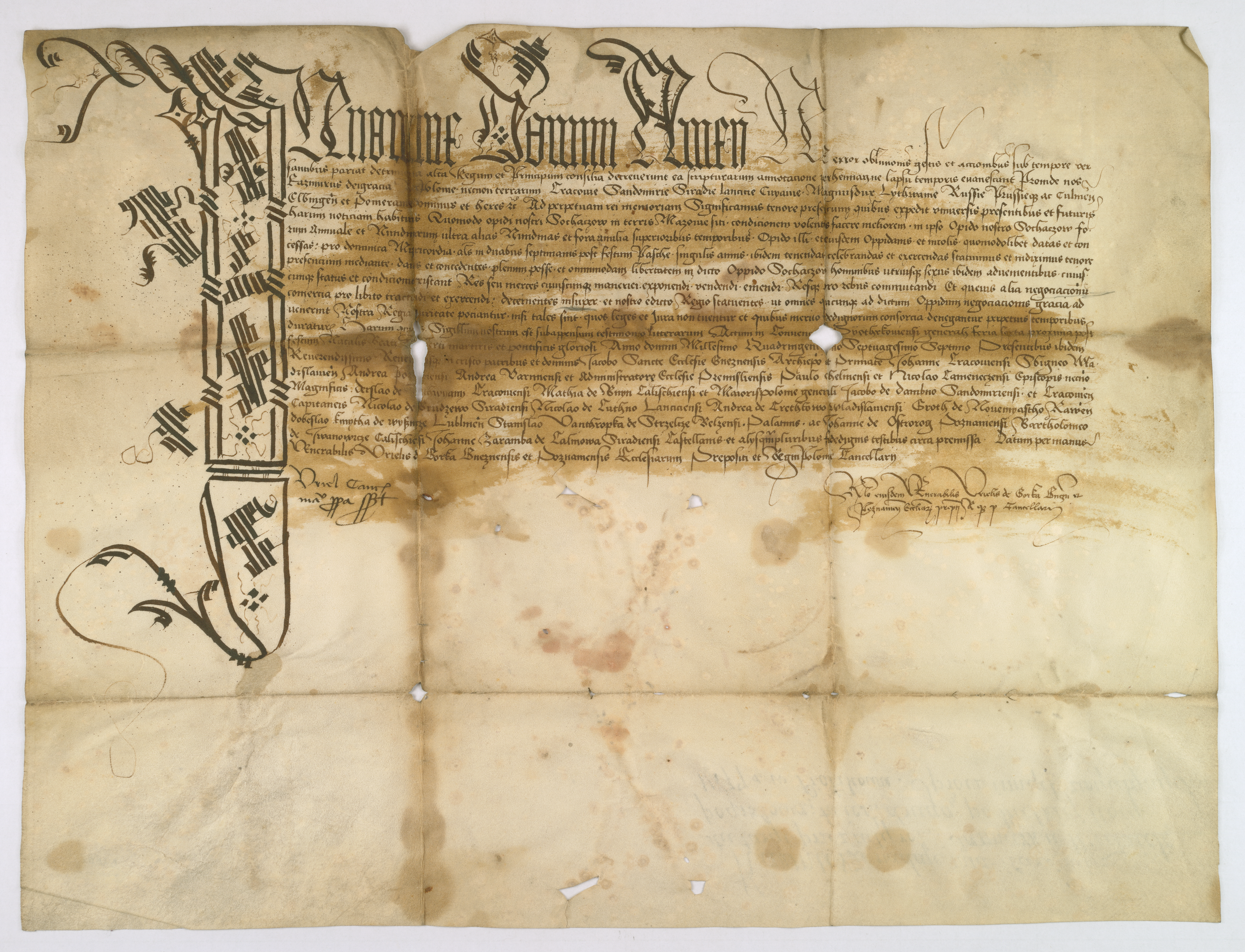
Privilege of Polish King Casimir IV Jagiellon from 1477, which established an annual fair in Sochaczew

Some time in the mid-14th century, Duke Siemowit III, Duke of Masovia held here a meeting of Mazovian dukes and notables. It is not known when Sochaczew received its town charter; by 1368 it had already been a town (civitas). After the death of Duke Siemowit VII, Sochaczew was on February 4, 1476 reintegrated directly with the Kingdom of Poland as a reverted fief. King Casimir IV Jagiellon granted several privileges to the town, including the right to hold annual fairs, on the second Sunday after Easter. Sochaczew was famous for its craftsmen, the town also had a royal mill. In 1478 the building of two churches was completed and in 1487 a hospital was built. At the same time, the town frequently burned in several fires (1461, 1506, 1539, 1590, 1618, and 1644). Sochaczew was a county seat and royal town of Poland, administratively located in the Rawa Voivodeship in the Greater Poland Province.

In 1570, the population of Sochaczew was about 3,000, with 211 craftsmen, 17 merchants and shopkeepers, and 394 buildings. The town had a wooden defensive wall, and its wooden bridge over the Bzura was very busy: in 1564, the bridge was crossed by 1,900 merchant horses, on their way to Płock and Wyszogród. The end of prosperity was marked by the great fire of July 1590, in which one-third of all buildings burned to the ground. By 1618, the number of buildings shrank to 110. In the same year, another fire destroyed half of the town. Further destruction was brought by Swedish invasion of Poland. Sochaczew was captured by Swedes on September 5, 1655. After five years of fighting, only 13 inhabited houses remained in the town in 1661.

A route connecting Warsaw with Poznań and Dresden ran through the town in the 18th century and King Augustus III of Poland often traveled that route. Sochaczew did not recover until the late 18th century, when several new houses were built. Following the Second Partition of Poland (1793), the town was annexed by the Kingdom of Prussia. Its population at that time was about 1,100, including 990 Jews. The town had 148 inhabited houses, but most of them were neglected and dilapidated.

=== Late modern period ===
In 1807 Sochaczew became part of the newly formed Duchy of Warsaw; several months later the town almost completely burned. In 1815, after the dissolution of the duchy, the town was transferred to newly formed Russian-controlled Congress Poland. On January 16, 1817, the District of Sochaczew was created, with its seat in Łowicz. In August 1818 Sochaczew burned again, after that fire, the center of the town was rebuilt (1819–1823), and the market square was paved. By 1828, the population grew to 3,200, out of which 76% was Jewish. The area of Sochaczew saw several skirmishes during the January Uprising. In 1867, the County of Sochaczew was created, but the town, due to its mostly wooden architecture, burned in several fires. In 1903, Sochaczew received rail connection with Warsaw, and by 1908, its population grew to almost 10,000. On December 2, 1913, art silk plant was opened by a Belgian investor in the district of Boryszew.

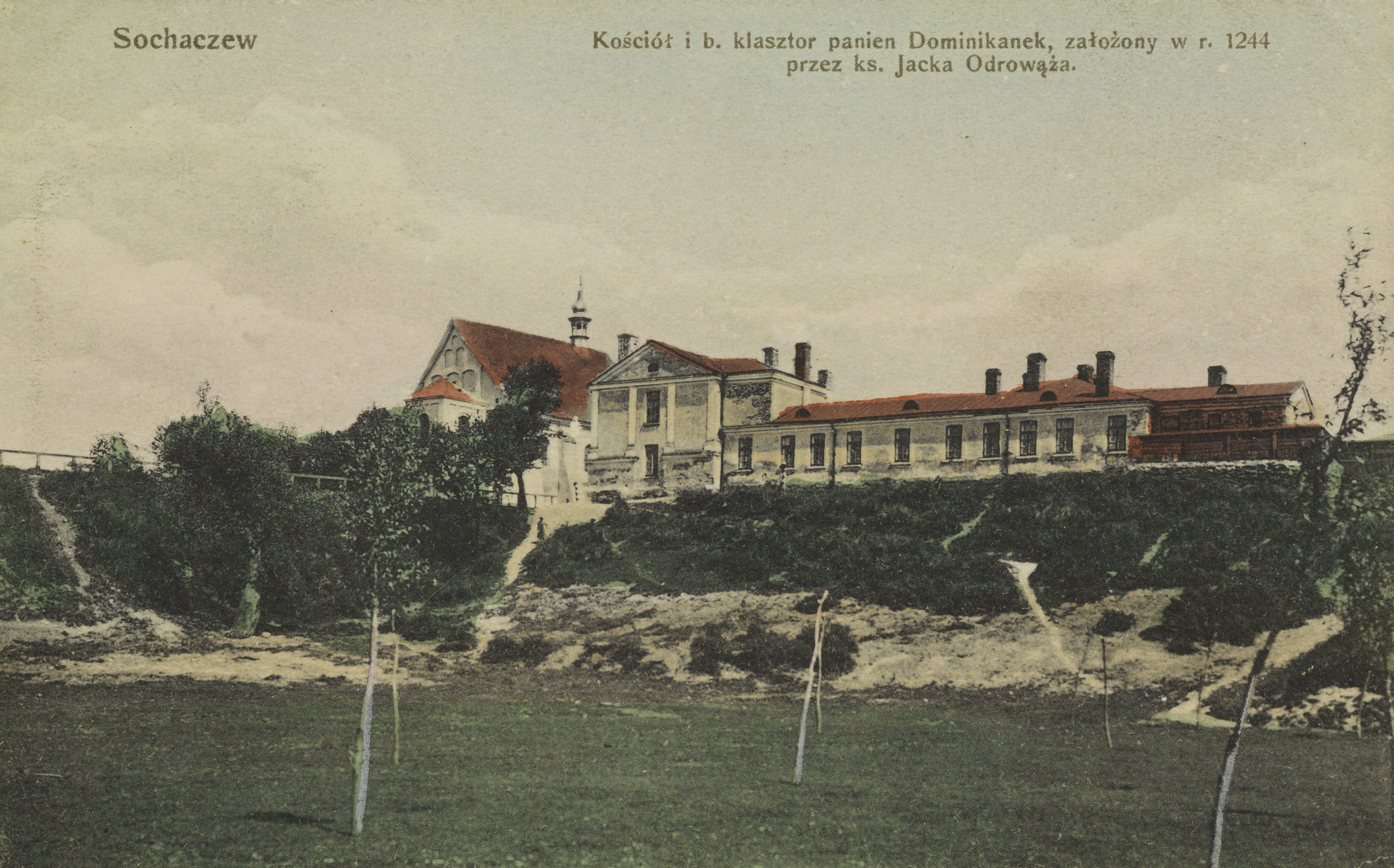
Early 20th-century view of the old monastery in Sochaczew

World War I had catastrophic consequences for Sochaczew. On October 5, 1914, after a bloody battle, the town was captured by Germans, who burned it completely, together with the Boryszew plant. From December 1914 until July 1915, fierce Russian – German fighting took place along the Bzura and Rawka rivers. The residents of Sochaczew fled from the destroyed town, returning in the summer of 1915, when Germans took control of it.

A Lubok popular print from this period illustrating the fighting bears the caption, "A brave detachment of Cossacks destroyed German hussars near Sochaczew."

Following the war, in 1918, Poland regained independence as the Second Polish Republic, and Sochaczew belonged to Poland since. The town was completely destroyed, and its impoverished population built wooden houses. The Boryszew plant was rebuilt, together with rail stations and its facilities. In 1927, construction of a textile plant began in the district of Chodaków. The town was rebuilt and partly electrified. By 1931, its population grew to almost 11,000, also due to expansion of the town limits by including adjacent settlements, such as Boryszew and Rozlazłów. Roman Catholics made 71% of population.

=== World War II ===
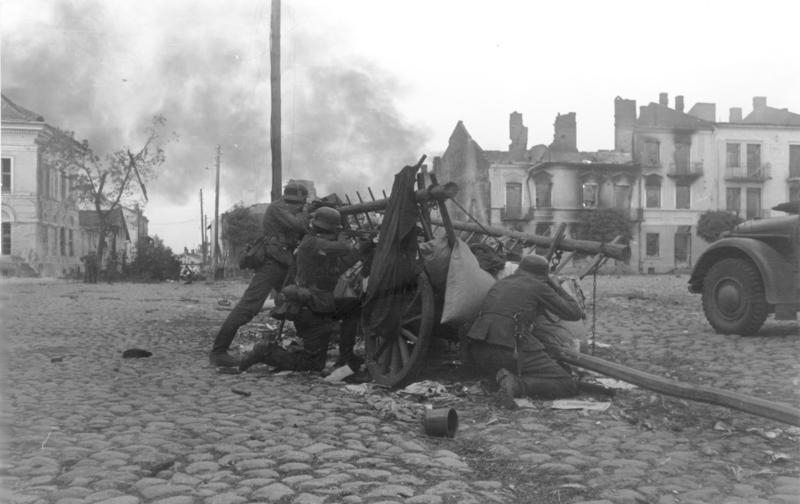
Battle of Sochaczew during the German invasion of Poland (1939)

On September 3, 1939, at the very beginning of the German Invasion of Poland, which started World War II, Sochaczew was bombed by the Luftwaffe. On September 9, first Wehrmacht units entered the town, where they remained until early September 13, when Germans were pushed out by the Polish Army, during the Battle of the Bzura. Due to German artillery fire, Poles abandoned Sochaczew on September 14–15, after a fierce and bloody battle. As a result of fighting there was widespread destruction in the town. On September 22 in the district of Boryszew, German troops massacred 50 Polish prisoners of war (see also Nazi crimes against the Polish nation).

13 Polish policemen from Sochaczew were murdered by the Soviets in Tver in April–May 1940 as part of the large Katyn massacre.

Before the advance of the eastern front, the Germans moved the headquarters of the governor, the SS, and the police of the Warsaw District of the General Government from Warsaw to Sochaczew. German forces remained in Sochaczew until January 17, 1945, when the town was captured by the Red Army, and then restored to Poland. In the war, Sochaczew lost over 4,000 residents, including virtually all of its Jewish population, and 40% of its buildings were destroyed.

== Museums ==
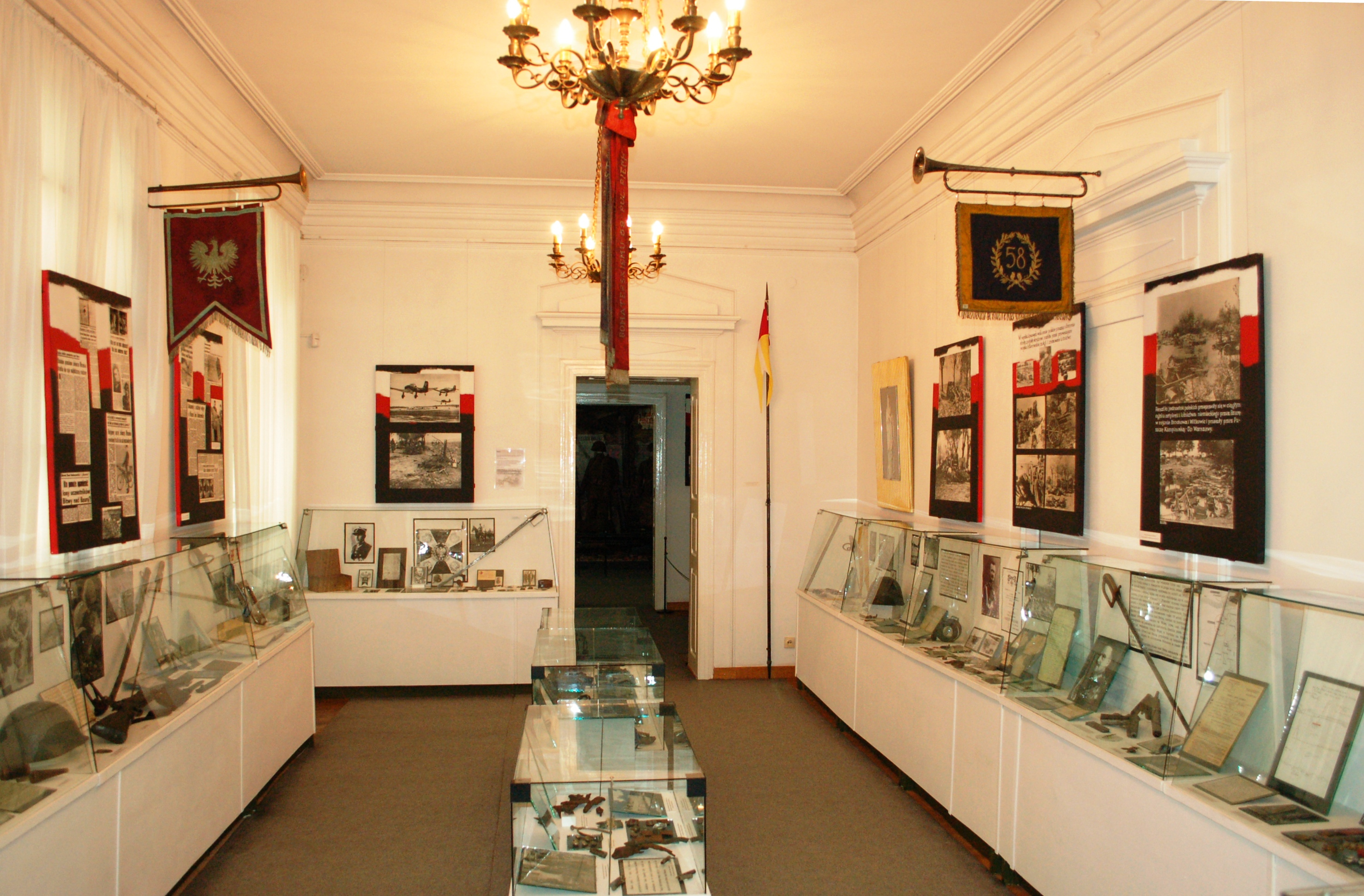
Military exhibition at the historical museum

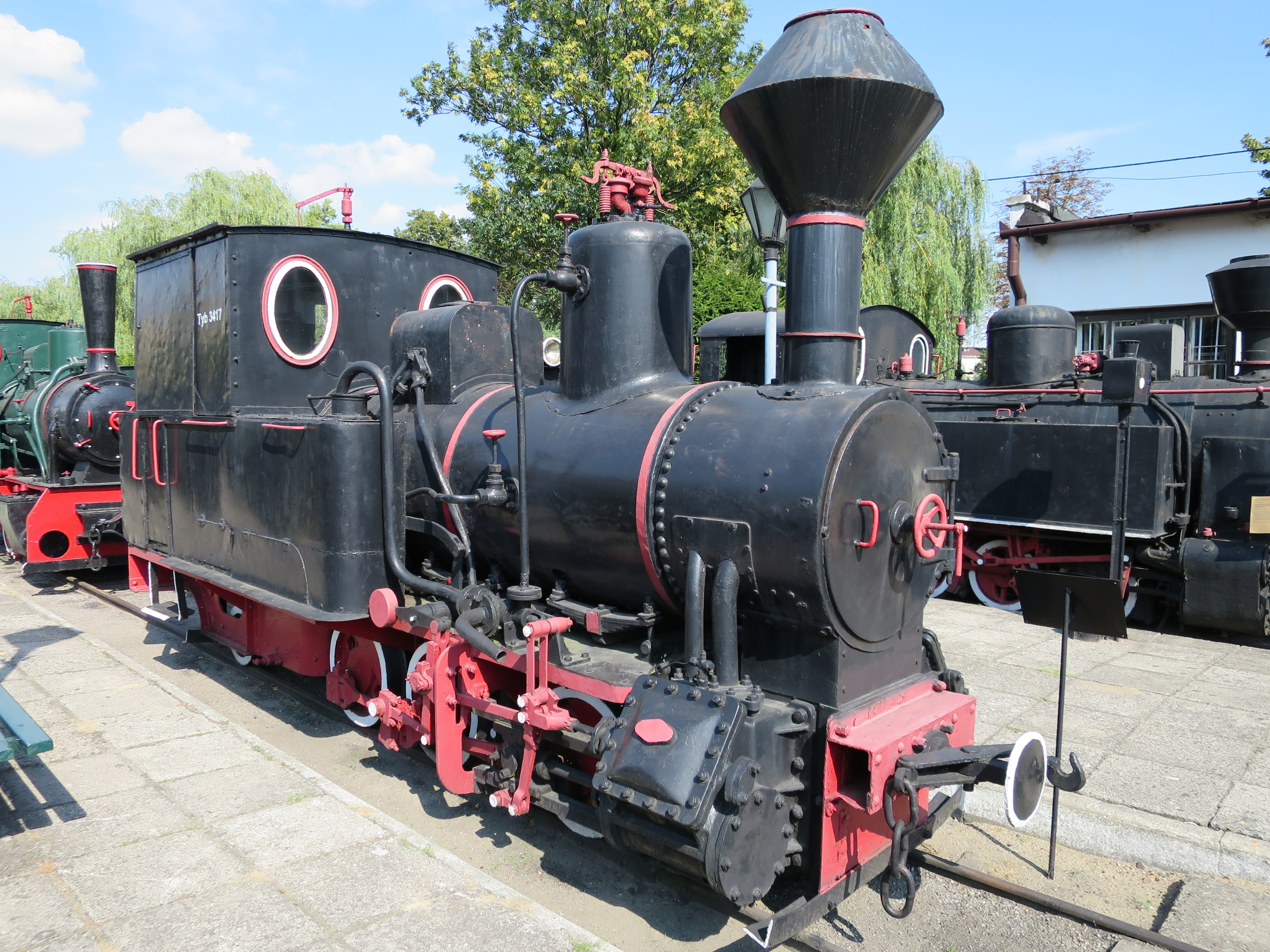
Narrow Gauge Railway Museum

Sochaczew has three museums.

- Muzeum Ziemi Sochaczewskiej i Pola Bitwy nad Bzurą (historic museum which has militaria from the battle that was in Sochaczew by the river Bzura in 1939)
- Muzeum Kolei Wąskotorowej w Sochaczewie ("Narrow Gauge Railway Museum in Sochaczew") is a 750 mm (2 ft 5 1/2 in)-gauge heritage railway. It was formerly the Sochaczewska Kolej Powiatowa ("Sochaczew County Narrow Gauge Railway"). It has a fleet of historic steam, diesel and electric locomotives, goods wagons, passenger cars and draisines.
- Fryderyk Chopin's Museum and House in Żelazowa Wola

== Transport ==
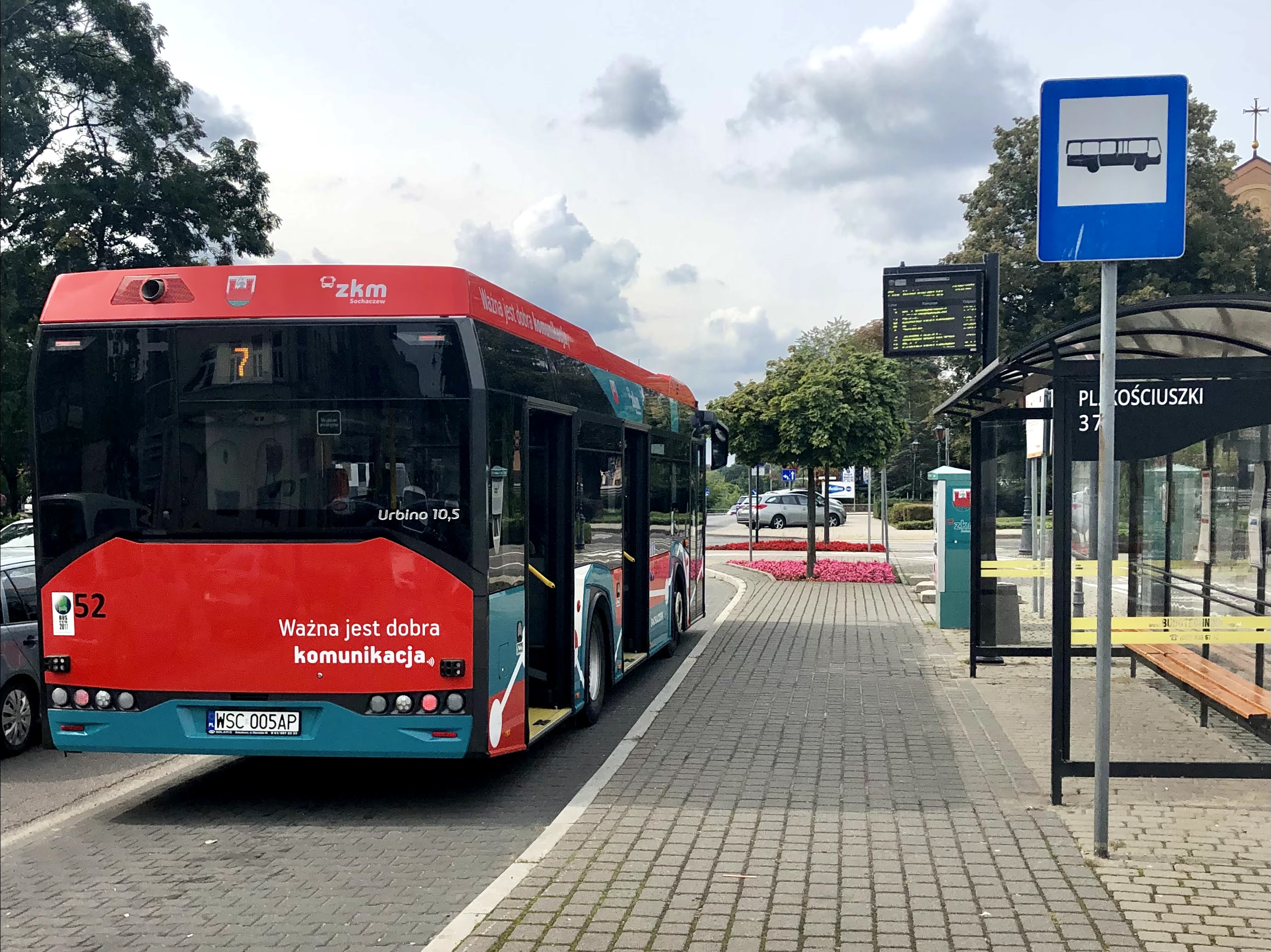
Municipal public transport bus in Sochaczew

Sochaczew is located at the intersection of Polish National roads 50 and 92 and Voivodeship roads 580 and 705. The A2 motorway runs nearby, south of the town. There is also a railway station in the town.

== Sports ==
The town's most notable sports clubs are rugby union team Orkan Sochaczew, which competes in the Ekstraliga (Poland's top division), and football team Bzura Chodaków, which competes in the lower leagues.

== Education ==
The city has a branch of VIZJA University.

== Notable people ==
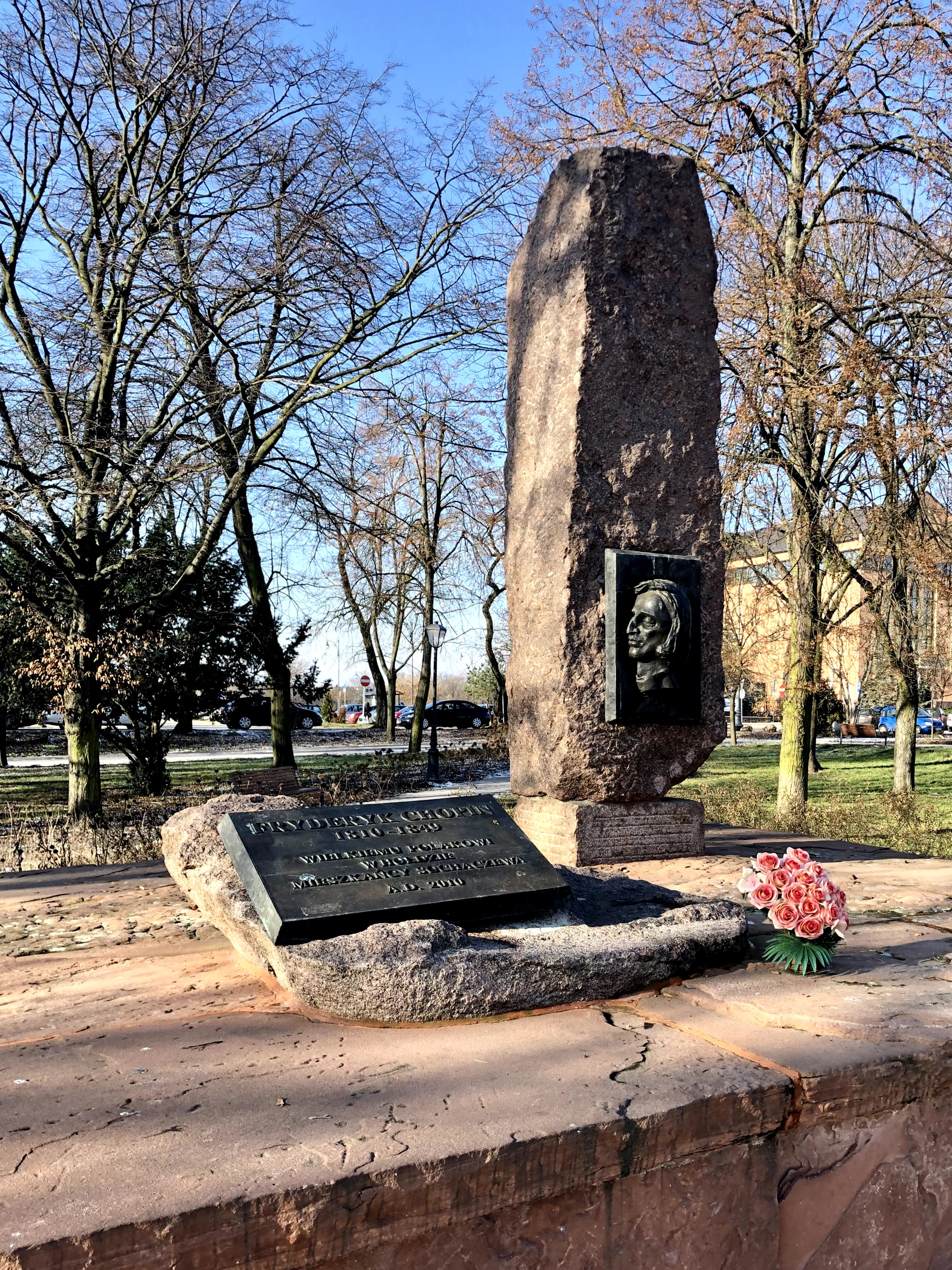
Fryderyk Chopin Monument

- Jerzy Artysz – opera singer
- Fryderyk Chopin – composer and pianist (1810–49) born in Żelazowa Wola, gmina Sochaczew
- Bogusław Liberadzki – former Polish Minister of Transportation, MEP – born 1948 in Sochaczew
- Avrohom Bornsztain – author of the Avnei Nezer, lived there and was buried there
- Jacek Hugo-Bader – reporter, journalist and writer
- Ryszard Bugaj – economist and politician
- Stanislav Rembski – artist
