= Gmina Sochaczew =

Gmina Sochaczew Sochaczew Commune
- Gmina
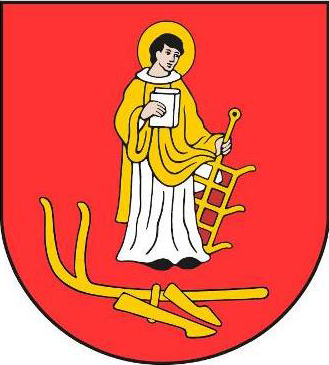
- Coat of arms
- Interactive map of Gmina Sochaczew
- Coordinates (Sochaczew): 52°13′45″N 20°14′19″E
- Country: Poland
- Voivodeship: Masovian
- County: Sochaczew
- Seat: Sochaczew

Area
  - Total: 91.41 km^{2} (35.29 sq mi)

Population (2006)
  - Total: 8,764
  - Density: 95.88/km^{2} (248.3/sq mi)

Gmina Sochaczew is a rural gmina (administrative district) in Sochaczew County, Masovian Voivodeship, in east-central Poland. Its seat is the town of Sochaczew, although the town is not part of the territory of the gmina.

The gmina covers an area of 91.41 square kilometres (35.3 sq mi), and as of 2006 its total population is 8,764.

The village of Żelazowa Wola, which is within Gmina Sochaczew, is the birthplace of the composer Frédéric Chopin.

== Villages ==
Gmina Sochaczew contains the villages and settlements of Altanka, Andrzejów Duranowski, Antoniew, Bielice, Bogdaniec, Bronisławy, Chodakówek, Chrzczany, Czerwonka-Parcel, Czerwonka-Wieś, Czyste, Dachowa, Dzięglewo, Feliksów, Gawłów, Ignacówka, Janaszówek, Janówek Duranowski, Jeżówka, Karwowo, Kąty, Kaźmierów, Kożuszki-Kolonia, Kożuszki-Ośrodek, Kożuszki-Parcel, Kuznocin, Łubianka, Lubiejew, Mokas, Nowe Mostki, Orły-Cesin, Pilawice, Rozlazłów, Sielice, Sochaczew-Wieś, Władysławów, Wójtówka, Wyczółki, Wyjazd, Wymysłów, Żdżarów, Żelazowa Wola, Zosin and Żuków.

== Neighbouring gminas ==
Gmina Sochaczew is bordered by the town of Sochaczew and by the gminas of Brochów, Kampinos, Młodzieszyn, Nowa Sucha, Rybno and Teresin.
