= Wyczółki, Sochaczew County =

Wyczółki
- Village
- Location within Poland
- Coordinates: 52°10′N 20°16′E
- Country: Poland
- Voivodeship: Masovian
- County: Sochaczew
- Gmina: Sochaczew
- Population: 130

Wyczółki [vɨˈt͡ʂuu̯ki] is a village in the administrative district of Gmina Sochaczew, within Sochaczew County, Masovian Voivodeship, in east-central Poland.
