= Kożuszki-Ośrodek =

- Village
- Location within Poland
- Coordinates: 52°13′17″N 20°19′16″E
- Country: Poland
- Voivodeship: Masovian
- County: Sochaczew
- Gmina: Sochaczew
- Population: 330

Kożuszki-Ośrodek [kɔˈʐuʂki ɔˈɕrɔdɛk] is a village in the administrative district of Gmina Sochaczew, within Sochaczew County, Masovian Voivodeship, in east-central Poland.
