= Lubiejew =

- Village
- Location within Poland
- Coordinates: 52°13′N 20°10′E
- Country: Poland
- Voivodeship: Masovian
- County: Sochaczew
- Gmina: Sochaczew
- Population: 110

Lubiejew [luˈbjɛjɛf] is a village in the administrative district of Gmina Sochaczew, within Sochaczew County, Masovian Voivodeship, in east-central Poland.
