= Chrzczany =

- Village
- Location within Poland
- Coordinates: 52°13′N 20°20′E
- Country: Poland
- Voivodeship: Masovian
- County: Sochaczew
- Gmina: Sochaczew

Chrzczany [ˈxʂt͡ʂanɨ] is a village in the administrative district of Gmina Sochaczew, within Sochaczew County, Masovian Voivodeship, in east-central Poland.
