= Sielice =

- Village
- Location within Poland
- Coordinates: 52°11′N 20°16′E
- Country: Poland
- Voivodeship: Masovian
- County: Sochaczew
- Gmina: Sochaczew

Sielice [ɕɛˈlit͡sɛ] is a village in the administrative district of Gmina Sochaczew, within Sochaczew County, Masovian Voivodeship, in east-central Poland.
