= Ryszard Bugaj =

Polish politician and economist

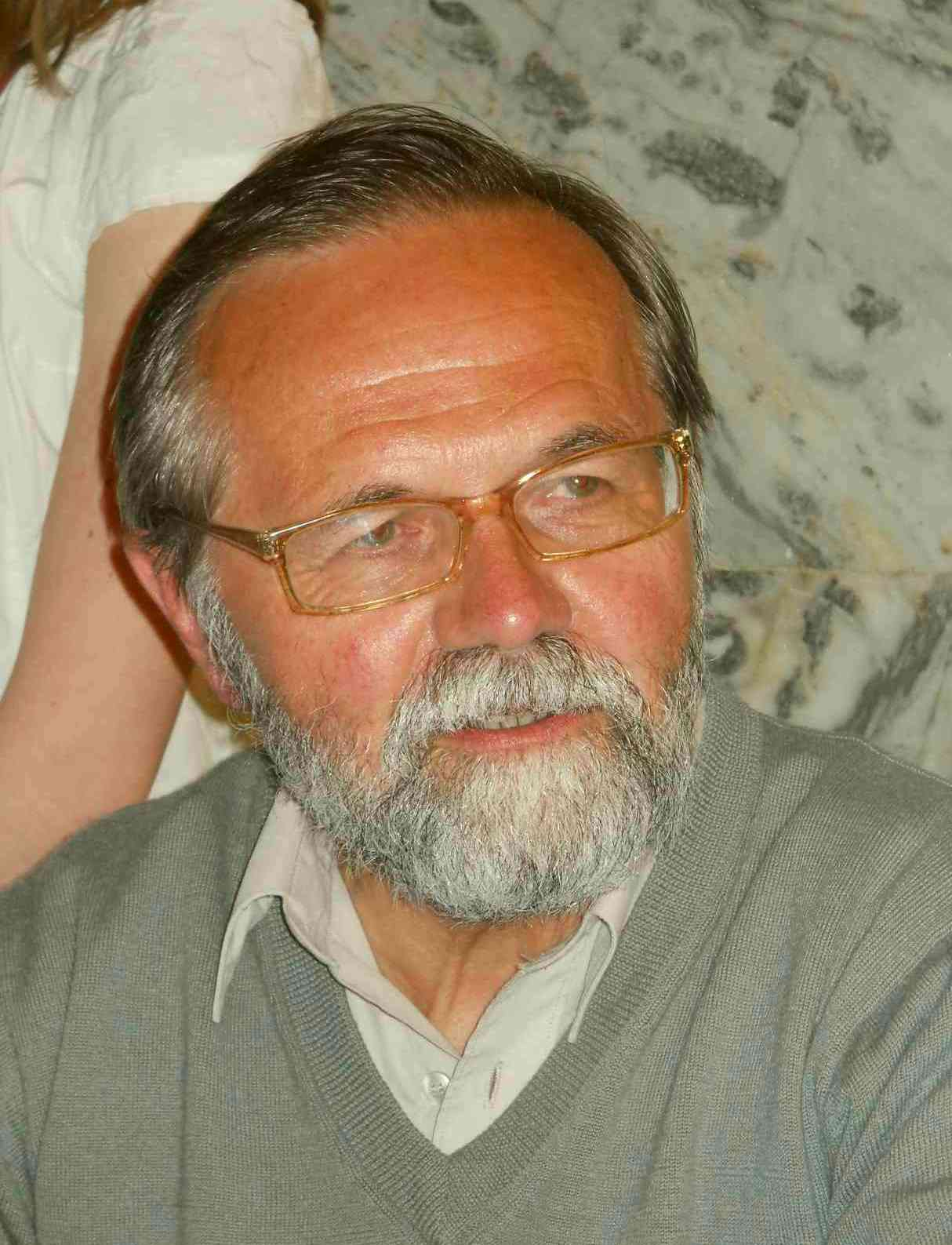

Member of the Sejm
- In office 18 June 1989 – 19 October 1997

Personal details
- Born: 22 February 1944 (age 82) Gawłów, Poland
- Party: Labour Union
- Education: University of Warsaw
- Awards: Order of Polonia Restituta; Cross of Freedom and Solidarity

Ryszard Bugaj (born February 22, 1944, in Gawłów, Masovian Voivodeship) is a Polish politician and economist, former leader of Unia Pracy (Labour Union), a member of the Sejm of three terms and former advisor to the then president of Poland, Lech Kaczyński.

== Biography ==
He graduated from the Faculty of Political Economy at the University of Warsaw in 1971, in 1989, based on his dissertation entitled Attempt to reform the system of financing the economy in the first half of the seventies, he became a doctor of economics, and in 2004, based on his scientific achievements and thesis entitled Dilemmas of public finance. Transformations in the Polish economy, he obtained the degree of habilitated doctor of economics.

In 1968, he took part in student protests against the removal of the play Dziady. In 1980, he joined Solidarity movement, in November 1980 he became a member of the Society of Scientific Courses, during martial law he was interned for several days. He participated in the Round Table talks. In 1989, he was elected a member of the Contract Sejm on behalf of the Solidarity Citizens' Committee. In 1990, he was one of the founders of Solidarity of Workers, and a year later he was elected a member of parliament for the first term from the list of this association. In January 1993, he became the chairman of the Labour Union party, co-founded by Labour Solidarity in 1992. In the 1993 parliamentary election, he won a parliamentary mandate for the third time, when the group he led received 7.28% of the votes. In the parliamentary elections of 1997, he ran unsuccessfully for re-election (Labour Union did not exceed the electoral threshold), and in the 1998 local elections, he ran unsuccessfully for a mandate of a councilor of the Masovian Voivodeship Sejmik from the list of the Social Alliance coalition. In 1997, he resigned from the position of chairman of Labour Union and in 1998 he left the party, opposing the policy of the new leaders Aleksander Małachowski and Marek Pol, who aimed to cooperate closely with the Democratic Left Alliance. In the 2001 parliamentary elections, he again ran unsuccessfully for the Sejm, this time from the Warsaw list of the Polish People's Party. He then founded first an association, then a short-lived party called Forum Polska Praca.

In 2003, he spoke out against the negotiated terms of Poland's membership in the European Union, while declaring himself a supporter of the accession itself. In the 2005 presidential election, he publicly supported Lech Kaczyński's candidacy. In early 2006, he returned to the Labour Union and took over as chairman of the party's political council. He left it again the same year, opposing Labour Union's entry into the Left and Democrats coalition. Since 5 February 2009, he has been a social advisor to the President of Poland, Lech Kaczyński, on economic matters. In 2014, he became a member of the program council of the Law and Justice party. In 2009, he became an advisor to the president of the National Bank of Poland. In October 2015, he became a member of the National Development Council appointed by president Andrzej Duda. In February 2016, he resigned from this body, explaining this by his opposition to president Duda's support for "the takeover of state institutions by the apparatus of the ruling party".

In 2025, he declared his intention to vote for Adrian Zandberg in that year's presidential election.
