= Kuznocin, Masovian Voivodeship =

Kuznocin
- Village
- Location within Poland
- Coordinates: 52°13′20″N 20°12′37″E
- Country: Poland
- Voivodeship: Masovian
- County: Sochaczew
- Gmina: Sochaczew

Kuznocin [kuzˈnɔt͡ɕin] is a village in the administrative district of Gmina Sochaczew, within Sochaczew County, Masovian Voivodeship, in east-central Poland.
