= Karwowo, Masovian Voivodeship =

Karwowo
- Village
- Location within Poland
- Coordinates: 52°14′13″N 20°14′19″E
- Country: Poland
- Voivodeship: Masovian
- County: Sochaczew
- Gmina: Sochaczew

Karwowo [karˈvɔvɔ] is a village in the administrative district of Gmina Sochaczew, within Sochaczew County, Masovian Voivodeship, in east-central Poland.
