= Wójtówka, Masovian Voivodeship =

Wójtówka
- Village
- Location within Poland
- Coordinates: 52°13′29″N 20°17′36″E
- Country: Poland
- Voivodeship: Masovian
- County: Sochaczew
- Gmina: Sochaczew
- Population: 100

Wójtówka [vui̯ˈtufka] is a village in the administrative district of Gmina Sochaczew, within Sochaczew County, Masovian Voivodeship, in east-central Poland.
