= Kaźmierów, Masovian Voivodeship =

Kaźmierów
- Village
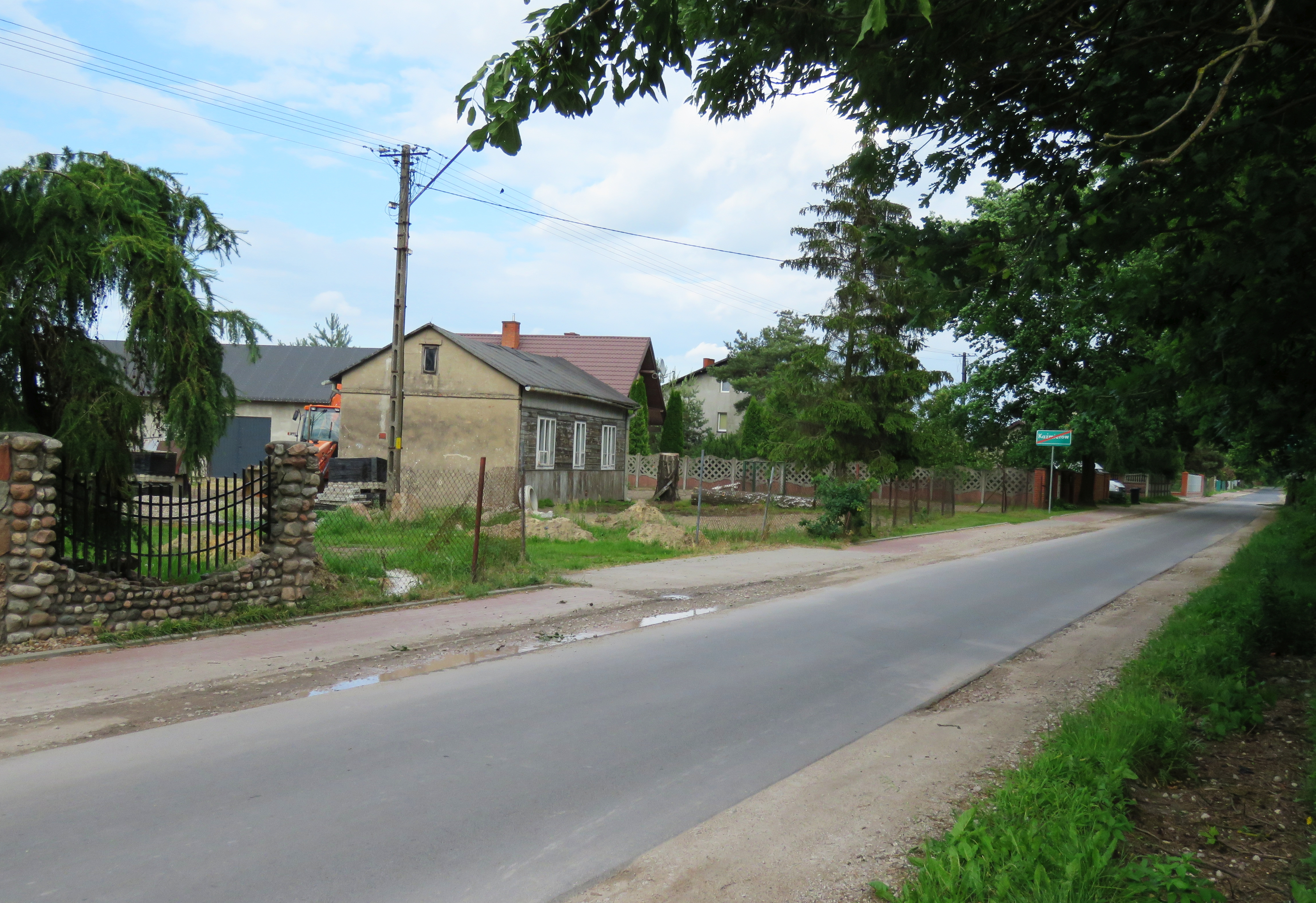
- Houses by the roadside of Kaźmierów

- Location within Poland
- Coordinates: 52°12′07″N 20°18′58″E
- Country: Poland
- Voivodeship: Masovian
- County: Sochaczew
- Gmina: Sochaczew

Kaźmierów [kaʑˈmjɛruf] is a village in the administrative district of Gmina Sochaczew, within Sochaczew County, Masovian Voivodeship, in east-central Poland.
