= Czerwonka-Parcel =

- Village
- Location within Poland
- Coordinates: 52°12′N 20°15′E
- Country: Poland
- Voivodeship: Masovian
- County: Sochaczew
- Gmina: Sochaczew

Czerwonka-Parcel [t͡ʂɛrˈvɔnka ˈpart͡sɛl] is a village in the administrative district of Gmina Sochaczew, within Sochaczew County, Masovian Voivodeship, in east-central Poland.
