= Kożuszki-Parcel =

Village in Gmina Sochaczew, Poland

- Village
- Location within Poland
- Coordinates: 52°13′N 20°18′E
- Country: Poland
- Voivodeship: Masovian
- County: Sochaczew
- Gmina: Sochaczew

Kożuszki-Parcel [kɔˈʐuʂki ˈpart͡sɛl] is a village in the administrative district of Gmina Sochaczew, within Sochaczew County, Masovian Voivodeship, in east-central Poland.
