= Nowe Mostki =

- Village
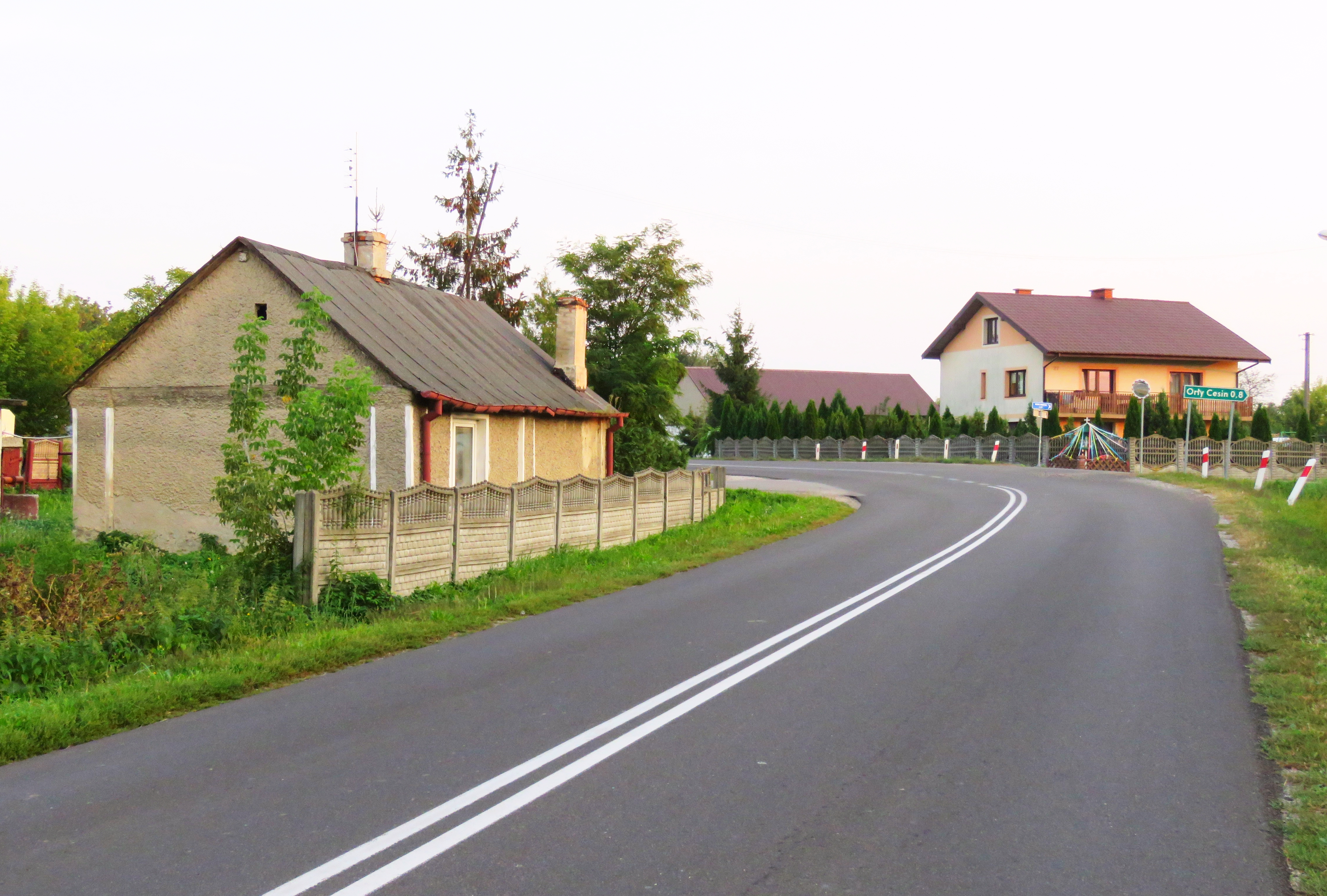
- Wayside houses in Nowe Mostki

- Location within Poland
- Coordinates: 52°15′10″N 20°18′39″E
- Country: Poland
- Voivodeship: Masovian
- County: Sochaczew
- Gmina: Sochaczew

Nowe Mostki [ˈnɔvɛ ˈmɔstki] is a village in the administrative district of Gmina Sochaczew, within Sochaczew County, Masovian Voivodeship, in east-central Poland.
