= Bronisławy, Gmina Sochaczew =

Village in Gmina Sochaczew, Poland

Bronisławy
- Village
- Location within Poland
- Coordinates: 52°15′15″N 20°11′38″E
- Country: Poland
- Voivodeship: Masovian
- County: Sochaczew
- Gmina: Sochaczew

Bronisławy [brɔniˈswavɨ] is a village in the administrative district of Gmina Sochaczew, within Sochaczew County, Masovian Voivodeship, in east-central Poland.
