= Kożuszki-Kolonia =

- Village
- Location within Poland
- Coordinates: 52°13′08″N 20°21′37″E
- Country: Poland
- Voivodeship: Masovian
- County: Sochaczew
- Gmina: Sochaczew

Kożuszki-Kolonia [kɔˈʐuʂki kɔˈlɔɲa] is a village in the administrative district of Gmina Sochaczew, within Sochaczew County, Masovian Voivodeship, in east-central Poland.
