= Władysławów, Gmina Sochaczew =

Władysławów
- Village
- Location within Poland
- Coordinates: 52°14′24″N 20°11′38″E
- Country: Poland
- Voivodeship: Masovian
- County: Sochaczew
- Gmina: Sochaczew
- Population: 121

Władysławów [vwadɨˈswavuf] is a village in the administrative district of Gmina Sochaczew, within Sochaczew County, Masovian Voivodeship, in east-central Poland.
