= Janówek Duranowski =

Village in Gmina Sochaczew, Poland

- Village
- Location within Poland
- Coordinates: 52°12′13″N 20°13′56″E
- Country: Poland
- Voivodeship: Masovian
- County: Sochaczew
- Gmina: Sochaczew

Janówek Duranowski [jaˈnuvɛk duraˈnɔfski] is a village in the administrative district of Gmina Sochaczew, within Sochaczew County, Masovian Voivodeship, in east-central Poland.
