= Kąty, Sochaczew County =

Kąty
- Village
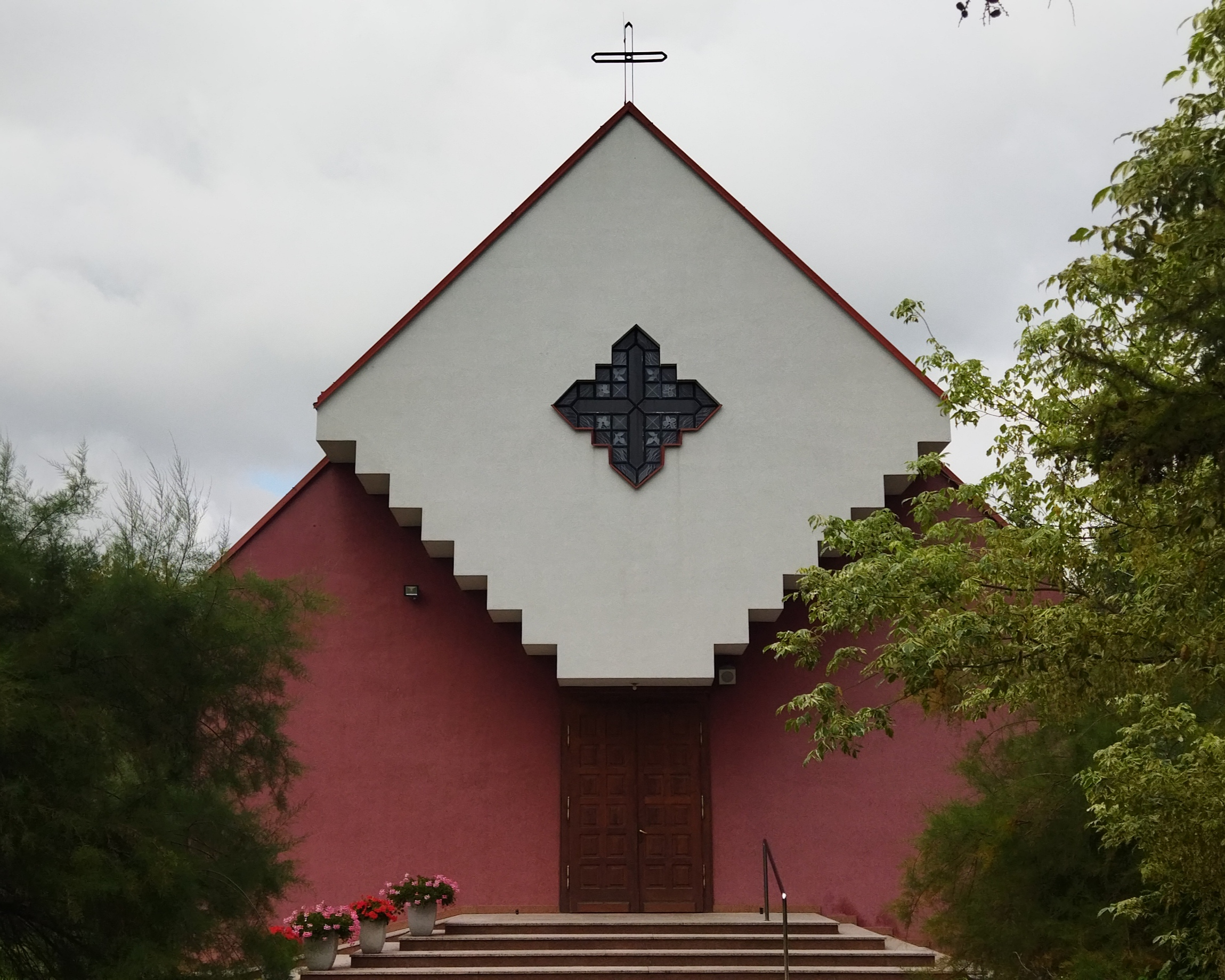
- Saint John the Baptist church in Kąty

- Location within Poland
- Coordinates: 52°14′29″N 20°11′44″E
- Country: Poland
- Voivodeship: Masovian
- County: Sochaczew
- Gmina: Sochaczew

Population (approx.)
  - Total: 508
- Time zone: UTC+1 (CET)
  - Summer (DST): UTC+2 (CEST)

Kąty [ˈkɔntɨ] is a village in the administrative district of Gmina Sochaczew, within Sochaczew County, Masovian Voivodeship, in central Poland.

One Polish citizen was murdered by Nazi Germany in the village during World War II.
