= Antoniew, Gmina Sochaczew =

Antoniew
- Village
- Location within Poland
- Coordinates: 52°15′9″N 20°10′18″E
- Country: Poland
- Voivodeship: Masovian
- County: Sochaczew
- Gmina: Sochaczew

Antoniew [anˈtɔɲɛf] is a village in the administrative district of Gmina Sochaczew, within Sochaczew County, Masovian Voivodeship, in east-central Poland.
