= Chodakówek =

Village in Gmina Sochaszew, Poland

- Village
- Location within Poland
- Coordinates: 52°15′35″N 20°18′04″E
- Country: Poland
- Voivodeship: Masovian
- County: Sochaczew
- Gmina: Sochaczew

Chodakówek [xɔdaˈkuvɛk] is a village in the administrative district of Gmina Sochaczew, within Sochaczew County, Masovian Voivodeship, in east-central Poland.
