= Gawłów, Masovian Voivodeship =

Gawłów
- Village
- Location within Poland
- Coordinates: 52°15′30″N 20°15′15″E
- Country: Poland
- Voivodeship: Masovian
- County: Sochaczew
- Gmina: Sochaczew
- Population (approx.): 4,000

Gawłów [ˈɡavwuf] is a village in the administrative district of Gmina Sochaczew, within Sochaczew County, Masovian Voivodeship, in east-central Poland.

Ambroży Mikołaj Skarżyński a Polish General who commanded a Napoleon's Imperial Guard squadron (Polish 1st Light Cavalry Regiment of the Imperial Guard) was born in the village.
