= Bogdaniec, Masovian Voivodeship =

Bogdaniec
- Village
- Location within Poland
- Coordinates: 52°14′24″N 20°20′42″E
- Country: Poland
- Voivodeship: Masovian
- County: Sochaczew
- Gmina: Sochaczew

Bogdaniec [bɔɡˈdaɲɛt͡s] is a village in the administrative district of Gmina Sochaczew, within Sochaczew County, Masovian Voivodeship, in east-central Poland.
