= Mokas =

- Village
- Location within Poland
- Coordinates: 52°17′N 20°20′E
- Country: Poland
- Voivodeship: Masovian
- County: Sochaczew
- Gmina: Sochaczew

Mokas [ˈmɔkas] is a village in the administrative district of Gmina Sochaczew, within Sochaczew County, Masovian Voivodeship, in east-central Poland.
