= Wilcze Tułowskie =

- Village
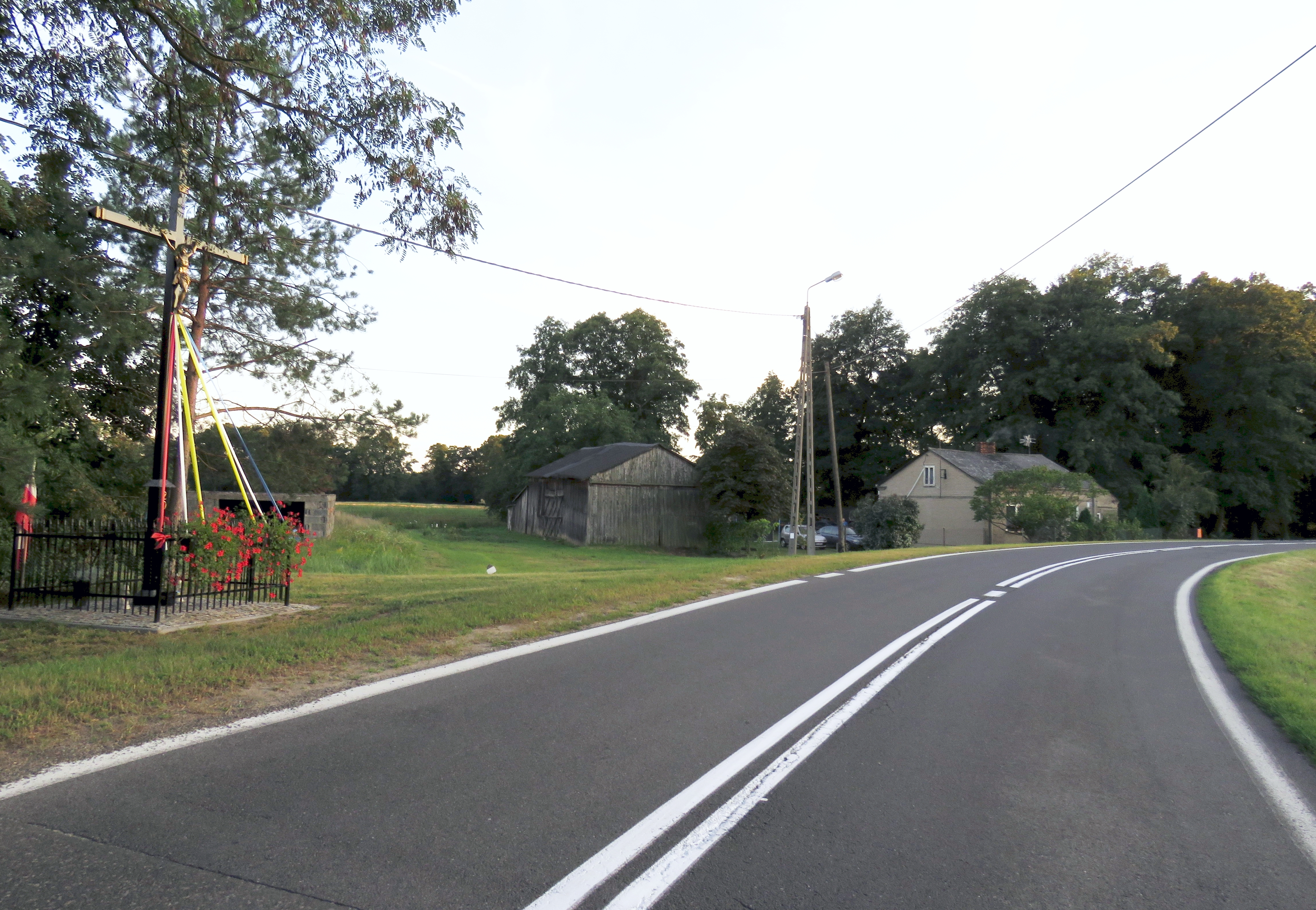

- Location within Poland
- Coordinates: 52°20′57″N 20°18′03″E
- Country: Poland
- Voivodeship: Masovian
- County: Sochaczew
- Gmina: Brochów

Wilcze Tułowskie [ˈvilt͡ʂɛ tuˈwɔfskʲɛ] is a village in the administrative district of Gmina Brochów, within Sochaczew County, Masovian Voivodeship, in east-central Poland.
