= Sadie (given name) =

- Gender: Feminine

Origin
- Meaning: diminutive of Sarah

Other names
- Related names: Sarah

Sadie is a feminine given name which originated as an English diminutive of the Hebrew name Sarah. It has long been used as an independent name.

== Popularity ==
Sadie was among the top 100 names for girls in the late 1800s in the United States, then declined in use in the mid-twentieth century. It increased in popularity beginning in the mid-1980s and is popular across the English-speaking world. It has ranked among the top 200 names for newborn girls in England and Wales and among the top 100 names for girls in Ireland, Northern Ireland, Scotland, the United States, Canada, Australia, and New Zealand in the 2010s.

== Cultural references ==
Sadie Hawkins, a character in the Li'l Abner comic strip, was the inspiration for Sadie Hawkins Day and Sadie Hawkins dances, where traditional gender roles are flipped and young women ask men out. The concept spread throughout America from 1937 onward. Australian singer John Farnham's debut single, "Sadie (The Cleaning Lady)" (November 1967), has Sadie as an ageing office cleaner. In Australia it reached No. 1 on the Go-Set National Singles chart in early 1968.

== Given name ==
- Sadie Bay Adair (1868–1944), American physician
- Sadie L. Adams (1872–1945), African-American teacher, suffragist, and clubwoman
- Sadie Aitken (1905–1985), Scottish manager, producer and theatre activist
- Sadie T. M. Alexander (1898–1989), African-American lawyer, activist, and economist
- Sadie Alexandru (born 1977), American actress and model
- Sadie Allen (1930–2017), British artist
- Sadie Ama (born 1987), English R&B singer
- Sadie American (1862–1944), Jewish-American activist and social worker
- Sadie Cecelia Annenberg (1879–1965), American philanthropist
- Sadie Barnette (born 1984), American artist
- Sadie Benning (born 1973), American video maker, visual artist and musician
- Sadie Maubet Bjornsen (born 1989), American cross-country skier
- Sadie Heath Cabaniss (1865–1921), American nurse
- Sadie M. Callan (1886–1970), American advertising agency owner
- Sadie Calvano (born 1997), American actress
- Sadie Canning (1930–2008), Australian nurse
- Sadie Chandler Cole (1865–1941), American singer
- Sadie Coles (born 1963), British art dealer
- Sadie Corré (1918–2009), English actress and dancer
- Sadie McCoy Crank (1863–1948), American temperance activist
- Sadie Crawford (1885–1965), British-American musician of the early jazz era
- Sadie Peterson Delaney (1889–1958), American librarian who pioneered bibliotherapy
- Sadie Docherty (born 1956), Scottish politician
- Sadie Engelhardt (born 2006), American middle-distance runner
- Sadie Kuttner Epstein (1883–1973), American concert singer
- Sadie Farrell (fl. 1869), American criminal, gang leader and river pirate
- Sadie Forman (1929–2014), South African teacher, librarian and anti-apartheid activist
- Sadie Frost (born 1965), English actress, producer and fashion designer
- Sadie Gibbs (born 1992), English professional wrestler and gymnast
- Sadie Griffin (1877–1958), American politician
- Sadie Grimm (1895–1970), Canadian motorcyclist
- Sadie Park Grisham (1859–1928), American educator and politician
- Sadie O. Horton (1899–1997), American female mariner in World War II
- Sadie Robertson Huff (born 1997), American television personality
- Sadie Jean (born 2002), American singer-songwriter
- Sadie Jones (born 1967), English writer and novelist
- Sadie Katz (born 1978), American actress, writer, director and producer
- Sadie Kaye, Hong Kong TV presenter
- Sadie Koninsky (1879–1952), American composer
- Sadie Lundquist (born 1991), American ice hockey player
- Sadie Menzies (1914–1996), Irish political activist
- Sadie Miller (born 1985), English actress
- Sadie Kneller Miller (1867–1920), early American woman sports journalist
- Sadie Morgan (born 1969), English designer
- Sadie Neakok (1916–2004), American first female magistrate in Alaska
- Sadie Grant Pack (1877–1960), American Mormon leader
- Sadie Roberts-Joseph (1944–2019), American community activist
- Sadie Robertson (born 1997), Duck Dynasty reality television star
- Sadie Sandler (born 2006), American actress
- Sadie Sink (born 2002), American actress
- Sadie Soverall (born 2002), British actress
- Sadie Stanley (born 2001), American actress and singer
- Sadie Waite (born 2004), Canadian soccer player
- Sadie Lea Weidner (1875–1939), American missionary to Japan

== Nickname ==
=== Women ===
- Sadie Bonnell (1888–1993), British ambulance driver and winner of the Military Medal
- Sarah Louise Delany (1889–1999), American author, educator and civil rights pioneer
- Sadie Dupuis (born 1988), American musician
- Josephine Earp (1860–1944), common-law wife of American Old West lawman Wyatt Earp
- Sadie Irvine (1885–1970), American artist and educator
- Sadie Martinot (1861–1923), American actress and singer
- Sadie Plant (born 1964), British philosopher, cultural theorist and author
- Sarah Frances Price (1849–1903), American botanist and scientific illustrator

=== Men ===
- Sadie Houck (1856–1919), American baseball player
- Sadie Jabbar (born 1957), Iranian boxer
- Sadie McMahon (1867–1954), American baseball player

== Fictional characters ==
- Sadie Adler, a supporting character in the 2018 video game Red Dead Redemption 2
- Sadie Gray, in the American television series One Life to Live
- Sadie Harris, in the American television series Grey's Anatomy
- Sadie Hawkins (disambiguation), multiple characters
- Sadie King, in the UK television series Emmerdale
- Sadie Lloyd, in the UK television series Family Affair
- Sadie McKee, the title character of the 1934 film of the same name
- Sadie Stone, in the UK television series EastEnders

== See also ==
- Sadie (disambiguation)
