= Vistula Germans =

Historic ethnic minority in Poland

Vistula Germans (German: Weichseldeutsche) are ethnic Germans who had settled in what became known after the 1863 Polish rebellion as the Vistula Territory. This territory, so designated by the ruling Russians of the time, encompassed most of the Vistula river basin of central Poland up to just east of Toruń.

== Migration history ==
The Vistula flows south to north in a broad easterly loop that extends from the Carpathian Mountains to its mouth on the Baltic Sea near Gdańsk. Many were invited in by the German and Polish nobility, but most settled in cities and large towns which were often governed under a form known as German town law.

German settlement on abandoned or empty land in Kujawy and Royal Prussia increased as land owners sought to re-populate their lands after the losses of the Great Northern War (1700–1721). Migration up the Vistula, to Płock, Wyszogród, and beyond, continued through the period of the Partitions of Poland by Prussia, Austria-Hungary and the Russian Empire. Much of the Vistula river basin area came under Prussian rule in 1793, becoming the provinces of South Prussia and New East Prussia.

In spite of the brief liberation of Polish territories by Napoleon (when the region was known as the Duchy of Warsaw), and in spite of the takeover by Russia following the Treaty of Paris (1815), German migration continued into the region throughout the 19th century. They often settled in existing communities but also established many new ones so that, by World War I, well over 3000 villages with German inhabitants could be documented.

Some German villages in the area were identified by the adjective Niemiecki, meaning "German" in Polish (e.g., Kępa Niemiecka). This differentiated a German village from another in the same immediate area where Poles lived (the Polish village might have the adjective Polski (e.g., Kępa Polska). After World War II, due to anti-German feelings, the adjective was commonly dropped or replaced by a term like Nowe (new). However, some villages even today still retain the old identifier.

The vast majority of Germans in this region were Lutheran. While they retained a clear Germanic ethnicity, traditions and language, they often adapted or adopted Polish culture and food and sometimes surnames. A limited amount of intermarriage between the cultures occurred. Large numbers of these Germans chose to leave the area during the Napoleonic occupation, heading further south and east to the Black Sea and Bessarabian regions of Russia. Still others headed east to Volhynia during the Polish uprisings of the 1830s and 1860s. In addition to fleeing unsettled conditions, the latter were also attracted by offers of land that became available as a result of the emancipation of serfs in Russia.

Significant numbers of Vistula Germans (including many who had spent a generation or more in the Black Sea, Bessarabia, and Volhynia regions) migrated to North America in the latter part of the 19th and early 20th centuries. Since most were farmers, they tended to head for opportunities of inexpensive or virtually free homestead land in the Midwestern and Plains States, and Canadian prairies. They are of course scattered about in other regions as well.

Those who remained in the Vistula area through World War II were expelled to German territory in accordance with the post-war agreements between the Allied Powers of Britain, Russia, and the United States. In a few cases, ethnic Germans who had been detained by Communist Polish authorities for forced labor remained in Poland, as did some ethnic Germans who had family ties with ethnic Poles. Some ethnic Germans were captured by Soviet troops, and were forced east to settle in Kazakhstan and Siberia. They were never repatriated.

== Dutch influences ==
In the 16th and 17th centuries, settlers from the Netherlands and Friesland, often Mennonites, founded self-governing villages in Royal Prussia. This type of village organization became known as the Olęder Law, and such villages were called Holendry or Olędry. Inhabitants of these villages were called Olędrzy, regardless of whether they were of Dutch, German or other descent. There were two Mennonite communities in Mazovia: one at Wymyśle Polskie and one at Deutsch Kazun. Some Mennonite adherents lived in nearby villages where a substantial majority of the inhabitants were Lutheran Germans, such as Sady or Świniary, and there was some intermarriage between the two faith groups. These contacts may have contributed to the Germanization of these Mennonites.

== Genealogy ==
Records for Lutheran Churches (as well as some Baptist and Moravian Brethren), many of them dating back to the late 18th century, can be found in Warsaw Archives and were microfilmed by the LDS Family History Library. Known available Lutheran records are listed on the website of the Society for German Genealogy in Eastern Europe. In some places few if any records exist, primarily because of their destruction in World War II. Where Lutheran Churches did not exist, or in times before their existence, the Germans would have been obliged to register at a Roman Catholic church.

== See also ==
- Olędrzy
- History of Germans in Russia and the Soviet Union
- Nazi-Soviet population transfers
- Flight and expulsion of Germans from Poland during and after World War II
- German minority in Poland
- German American
- Volga Germans
