= 2010 Central European floods =

Coordinates: 50.294492°N 18.67138°E

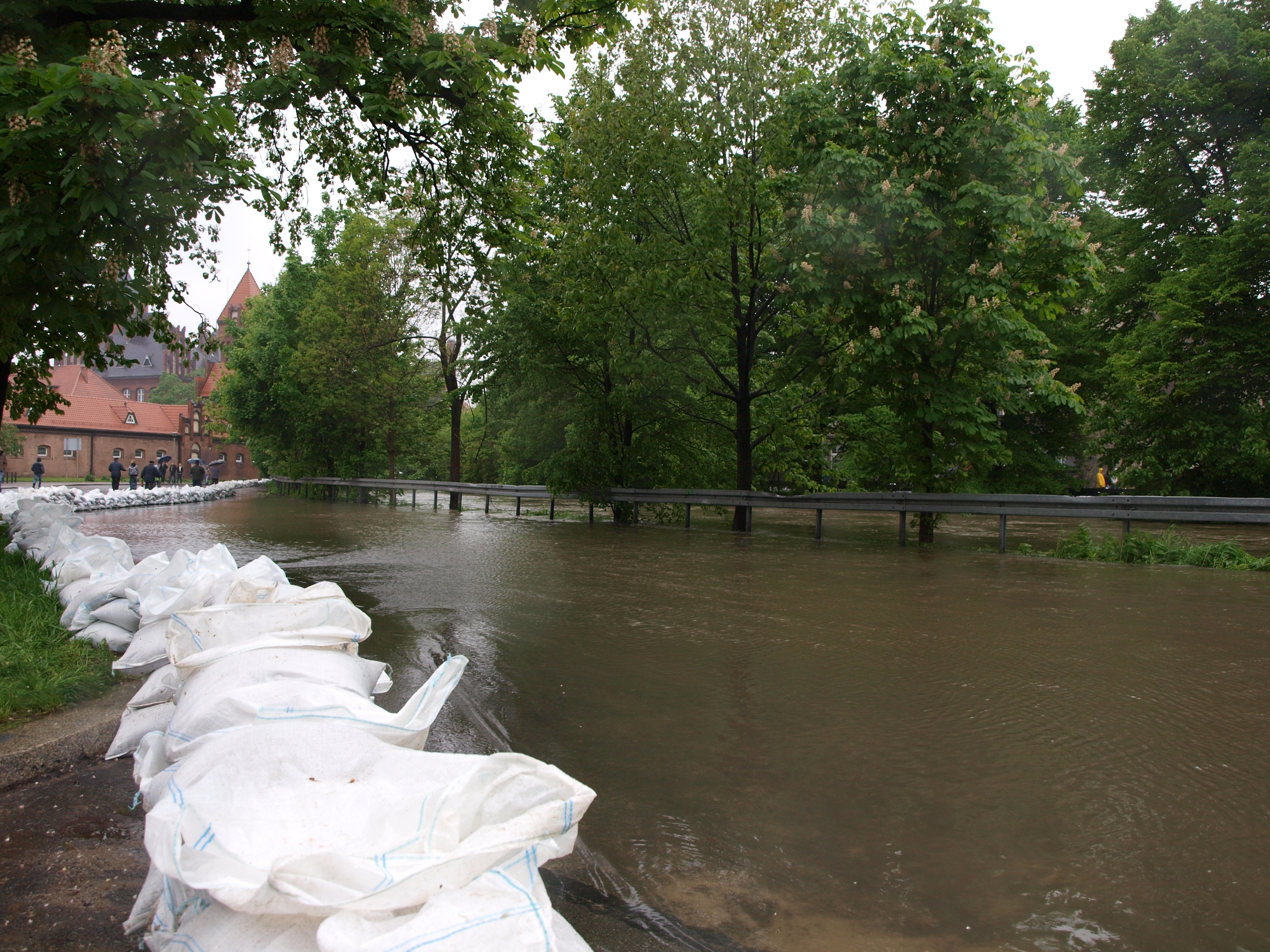
- Floods in Gliwice, Poland

Meteorological history
- Duration: May–June 2010

Overall effects
- Fatalities: 37

The 2010 Central European floods were a devastating series of weather events which occurred across several Central European countries during May and June 2010. Poland was the worst affected. Austria, the Czech Republic, Hungary, Slovakia and Serbia were also affected.

Across all six countries, at least thirty-seven people died in the floods and approximately 23,000 people were evacuated. The city of Kraków declared a state of emergency.

The floods forced the closure and relocation of items from the Auschwitz concentration camp museum. On 20 May, aid began arriving to Poland from several European Union countries.

== Poland ==
In Poland, the floods caused the deaths of at least 25 people, the evacuation of approximately 23,000 people, and an estimated economic cost of 2.5 billion euros. Poland's Prime Minister Donald Tusk informed the Sejm that ongoing flooding was "the worst natural disaster in the nation's history ... without precedent in the past 160 years".

Two months' worth of rain poured down over a 24‑hour period. The Auschwitz-Birkenau State Museum was closed and important artifacts were moved to higher ground as floodwaters approached. The city of Kraków announced a state of emergency. Due to the high level of the Vistula river, Kraków's Dębnicki bridge, located in the center of the city, and the Nowohucki bridge were closed on 18 May.

The flooding lasted for a number of days, and escalated on 20 May when the Vistula River broke its banks. In the town of Sandomierz, residents were stranded in their homes while power outages affected telecommunication. The 2010 flooding was considered more severe than the last major flood, in 1997.

Wrocław, where the level of the Oder river on 22 May reached 665 cm in Trestno, declared a flood alert. The Kozanów district of Wrocław was flooded after a temporary sandbag wall was breached.

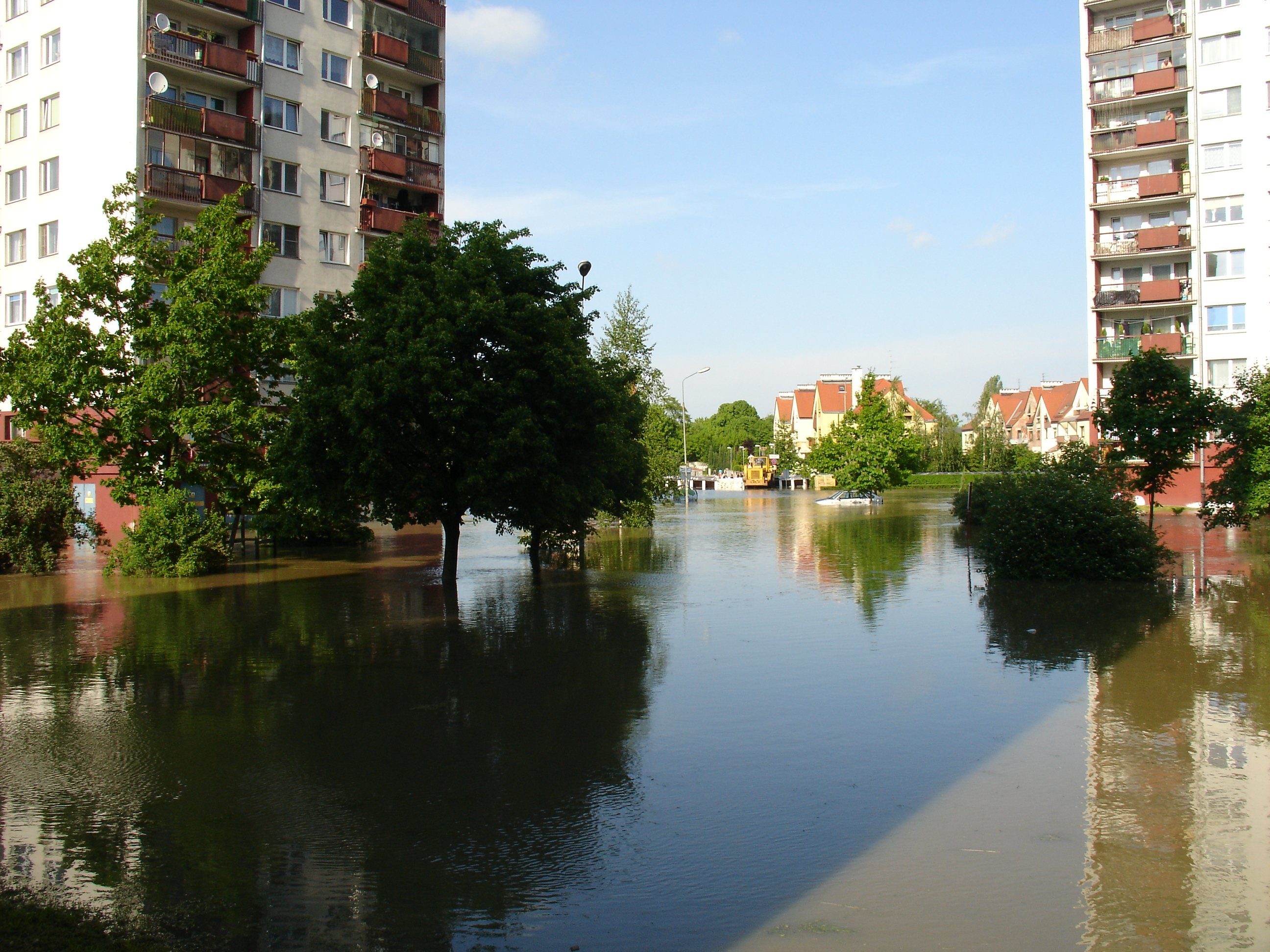
Wrocław's flooded Kozanów district

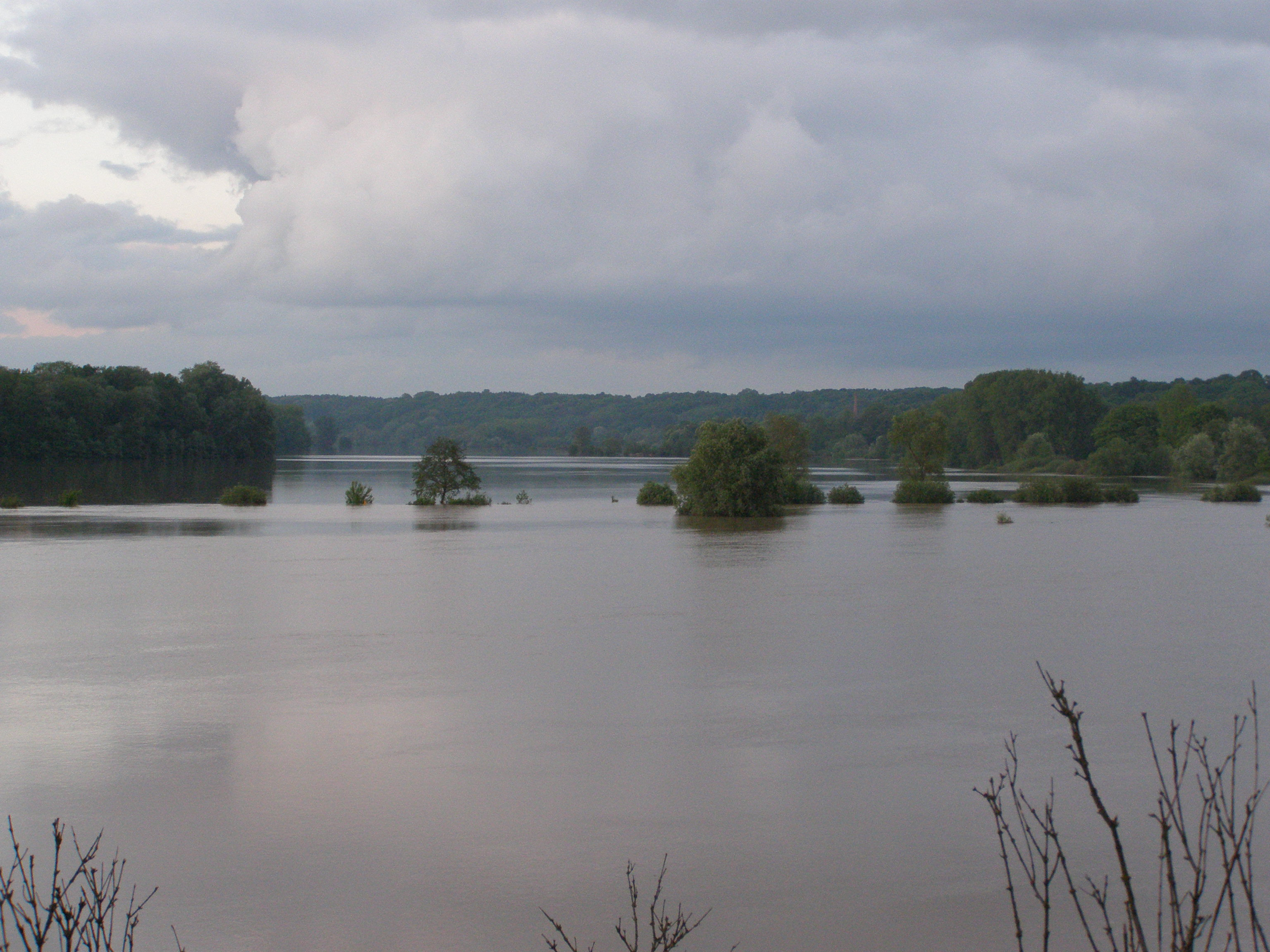
Vistula broads in Strzyżawa - The riverbed is located approximately 500m from the edge of the forest on the left side

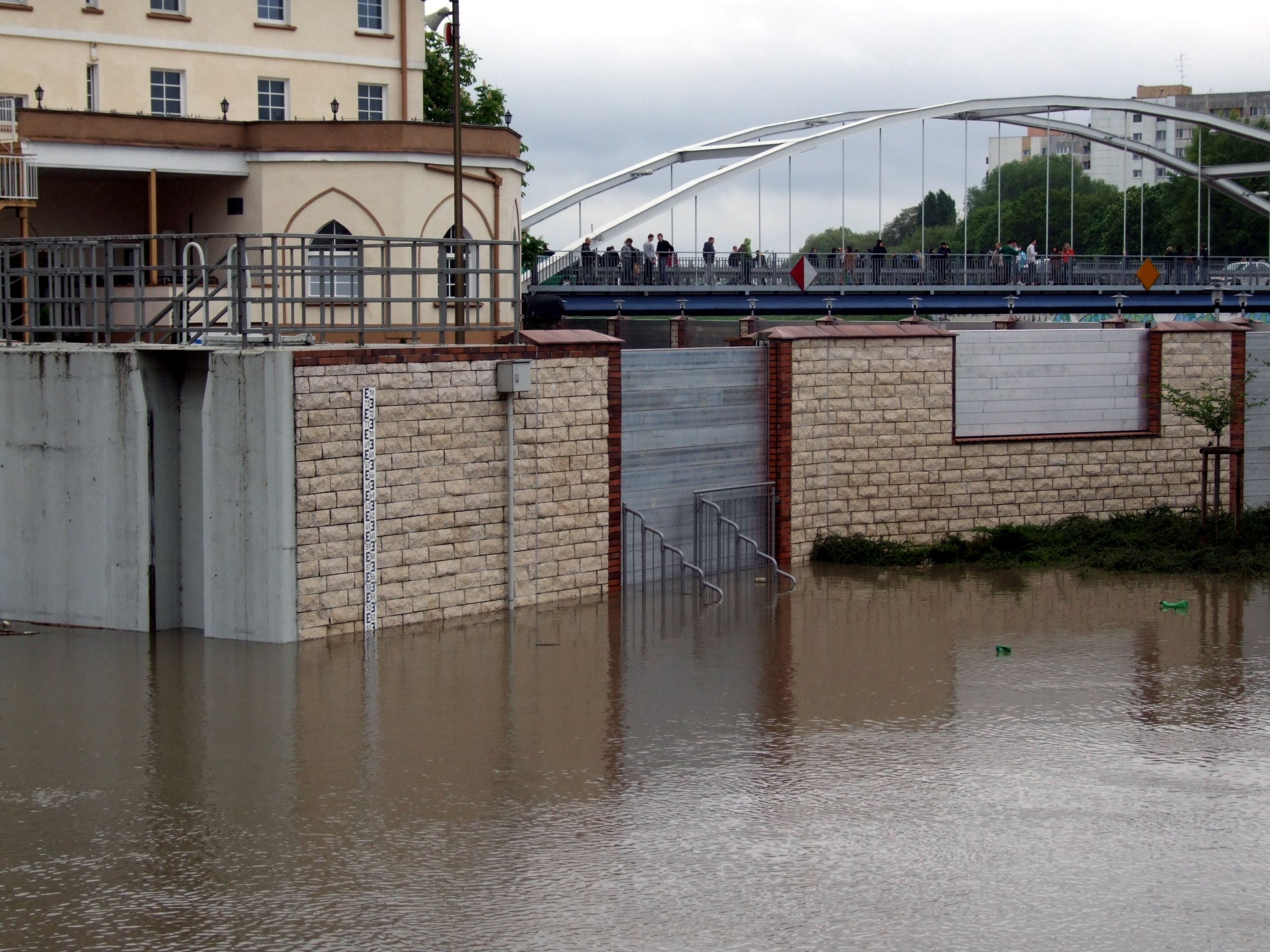
Flood in Opole

On Sunday 23 May the Wisła river broke a retaining wall and flooded Świniary near Płock, and nearby villages, including Szady, Wiączemin Polski, Nowy Wiączemin and Nowosiodło. Reports stated that 22 villages in the Płock area had sustained flooding or were under imminent threat. Around 4,000 people and 5,000 animals were evacuated. In Płock, Gmury street was submerged.

In the Lublin Voivodeship, 800 people had to be evacuated after the river Chodelka flooded in the Gmina Wilków. On 23 May, it was reported that 23 villages were already flooded with 4–5 meters of water and the situation continued to worsen.

During the May floods, at least 6,200 households in the Małopolska region alone were fully or partially flooded and 12,000 people were affected by it. Numerous other places in Poland were flooded too. In the Lesser Poland Voivodeship, another flood alert was announced on 2 June in relation to Kraków, Tarnów, the counties of Bochnia, Brzesko, Dąbrowa, and Sucha, and eight gminas. Twelve rivers exceeded the alarm level in 14 places and eleven rivers exceeded warning levels in 21 places. On 4 June the railway bridge between Nowy Sącz and Stary Sącz was broken by the river Poprad. At least three people fell from the bridge into the rushing waters. According to some reports their fate is still unknown while other say they managed to save themselves. The Poprad river also flooded the town of Muszyna. On 5 June the Vistula flooded the Gmina Szczucin and around 3,000 people had to be evacuated.

In the Silesian Voivodeship, flood alerts were again issued in the Bielsko, Bieruń-Lędziny, Cieszyn, Gliwice, Pszczyna, Racibórz, Wodzisław and Żywiec counties, and in the cities of Bielsko-Biała, Gliwice and Zabrze. In the Lublin Voivodeship, river-side gminas announced flood alerts.

In the Subcarpathian Voivodeship, the river Ropa flooded the town of Jasło on 5 June.

From 3 June, the Trześniówka river flooded the part of the city of Sandomierz (located in the Świętokrzyskie Voivodeship) which lies on the right side of the Vistula, and which was already flooded in May. The city was also threatened by the Vistula river which reached 770 cm, over 100 cm past the alarm level.

== Czech Republic ==
In the Czech Republic, the heaviest rain in the region for eight years was reported. A state of emergency was declared in a total of 302 municipalities across the Zlín Region and Moravian-Silesian Region. One death was reported, due to drowning. The president of the Czech Republic had to be evacuated to Ústí nad Labem.

== Hungary ==
In Borsod-Abaúj-Zemplén County, Northern Hungary eighteen towns and villages were cut from the outside world by the flood of the rivers Sajó, Hernád and Bódva. More than 480 people had to leave their homes. In Miskolc the Szinva flooded the Diósgyőr district of the city during what was described by locals as "the biggest flood since 1975".

Several roads became unusable; the border checkpoint of Sátoraljaújhely/Slovenské Nové Mesto was closed on June 1. In Pásztó (Nógrád county), a local reservoir threatened to overflow; the earthen dam was strengthened by sandbags. 2,000 people had to leave their homes. Houses would be under 4m of water within seven minutes of the collapse of the dam. A short part of Motorway M1 collapsed near Győr.

== Fatalities ==
On 17 May, the death toll reached five people. Four of these were in Poland and included a fireman. The fifth was in the Czech Republic.

On 21 May, the death toll in Poland had reached at least nine people with the whereabouts of three others being unknown. On 24 May there were 15 confirmed dead in Poland.

The flood claimed several casualties in Hungary too: a man, whose house collapsed on him, died in Miskolc, while a woman died and two other persons suffered injuries in a car crash in Fejér county, where a car slipped on the flooded road; also in Fejér county a tree fell during the heavy rain, hitting a man who suffered life-threatening injuries.

Country	Deaths
Poland	25
Austria	3
Serbia	2
Hungary	2
Slovakia	1+2
Czech Republic	1+1
Total	37

== Recovery ==
Poland asked for assistance from other European Union nations. France, Germany, Lithuania, Latvia and Estonia arrived on 20 May, as well as the Czech Republic, despite that country being affected by the floods too. On 25 May 2010, Poland received help also from Russia (including 18 high-power pumps, 34 boats and 5 mobile power stations).

== Gallery ==
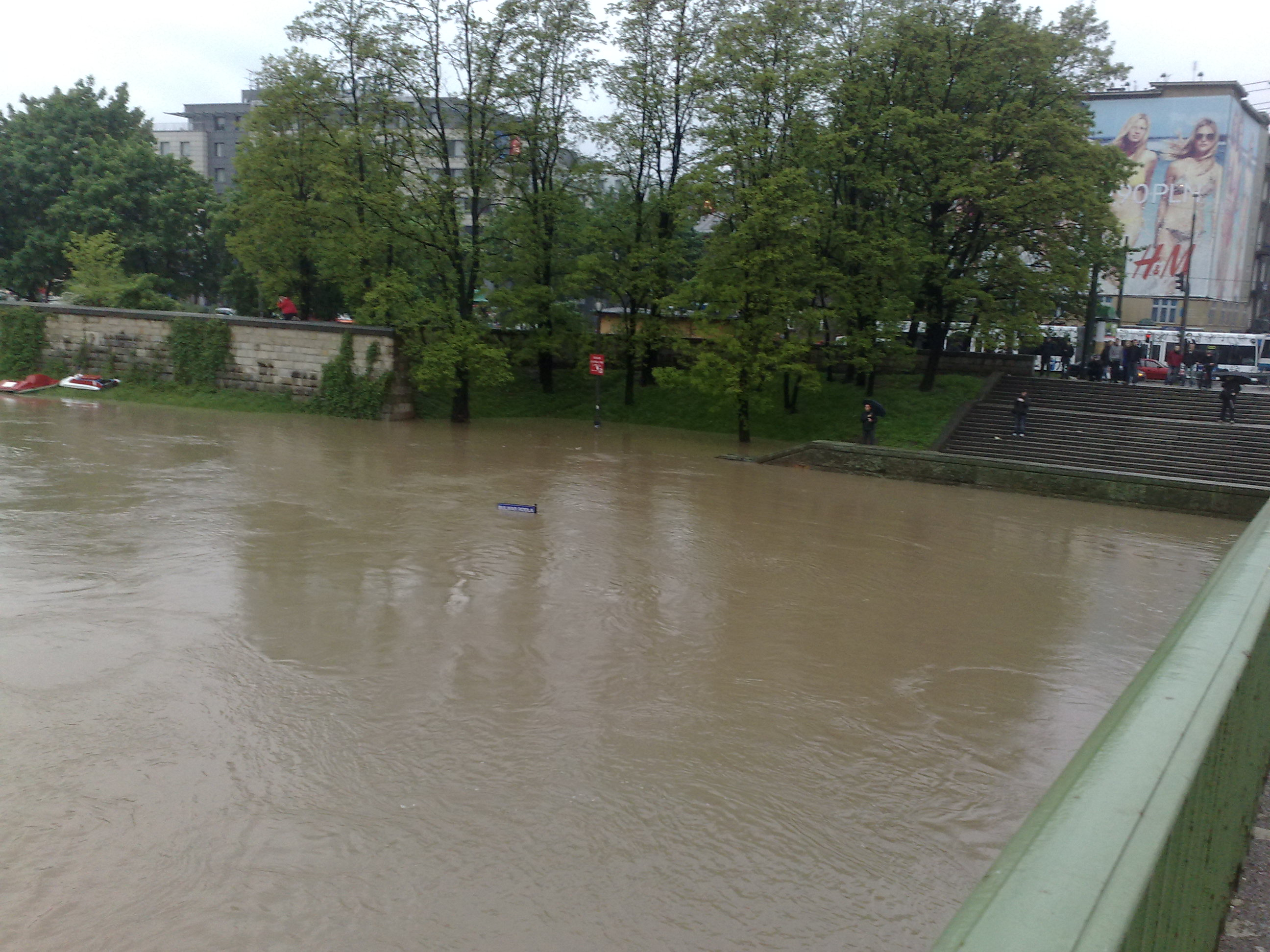
Vistula in Kraków, Poland on May 17

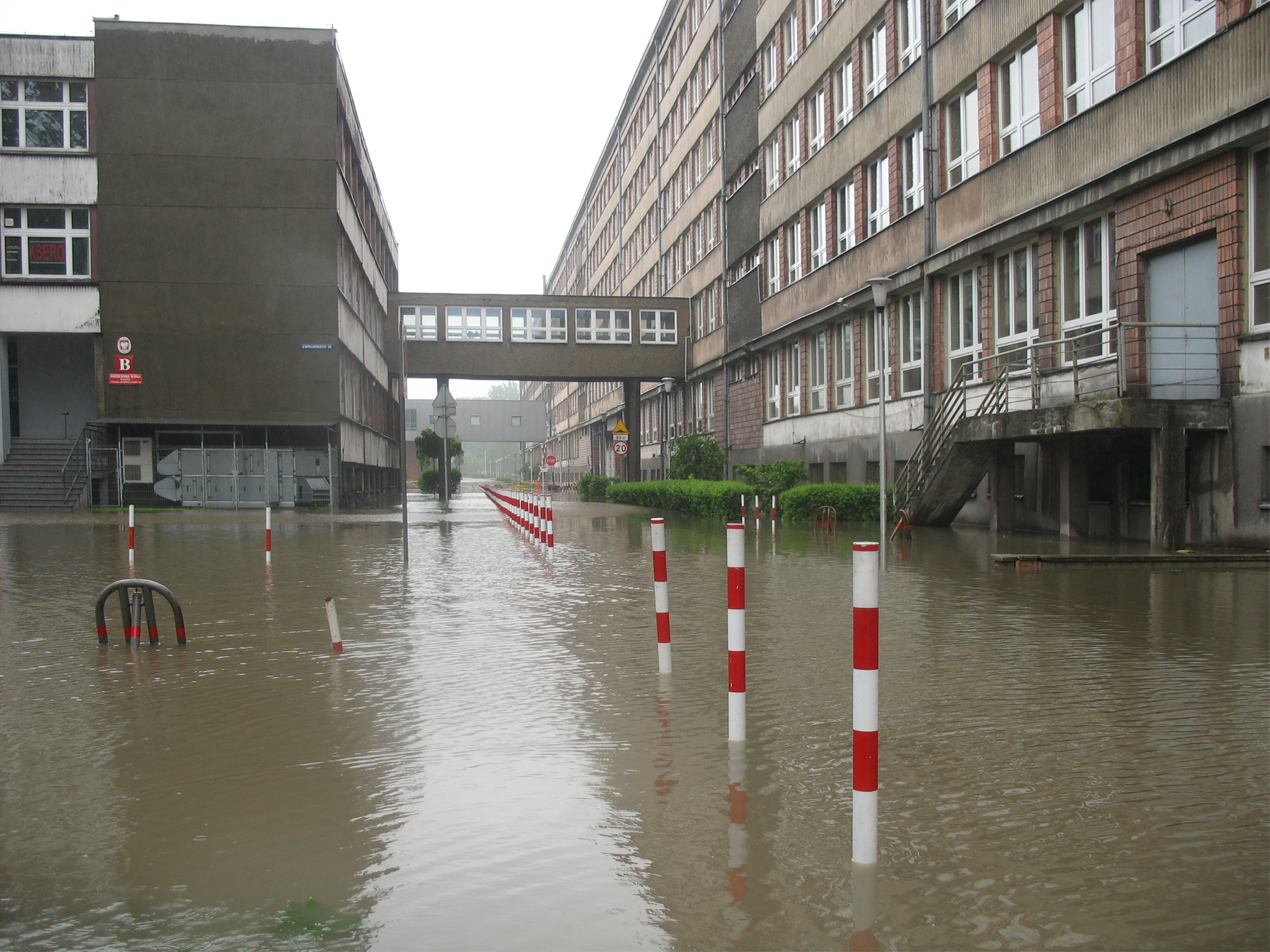
The Silesian University of Technology in Gliwice, Poland on 18 May

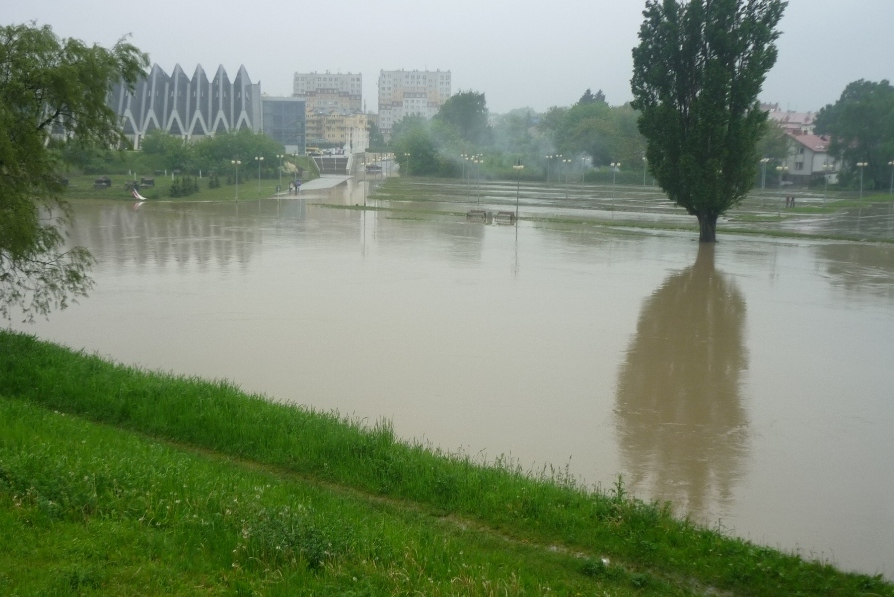
Wisłok in Rzeszów, Poland on May 20

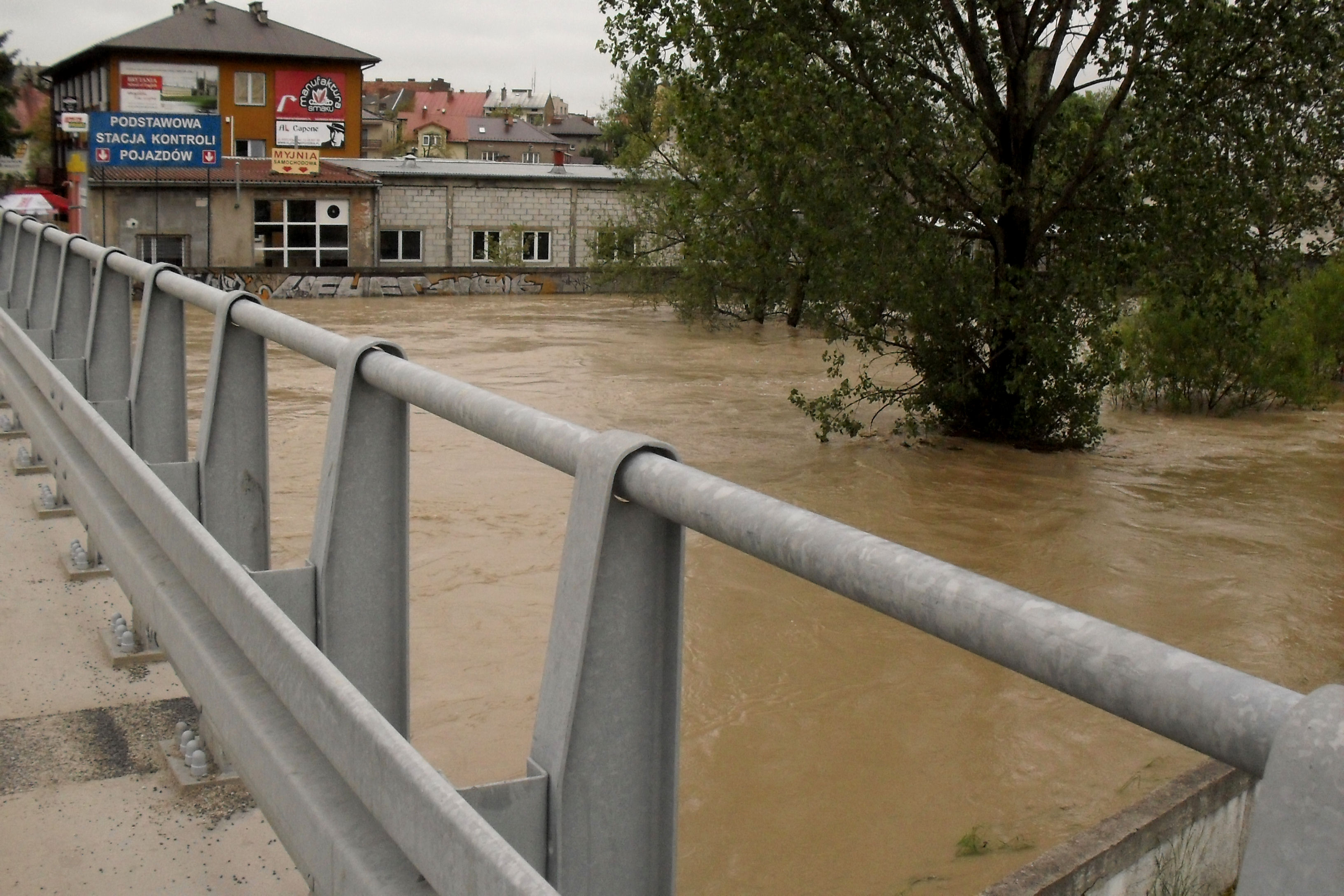
river Jasiołka

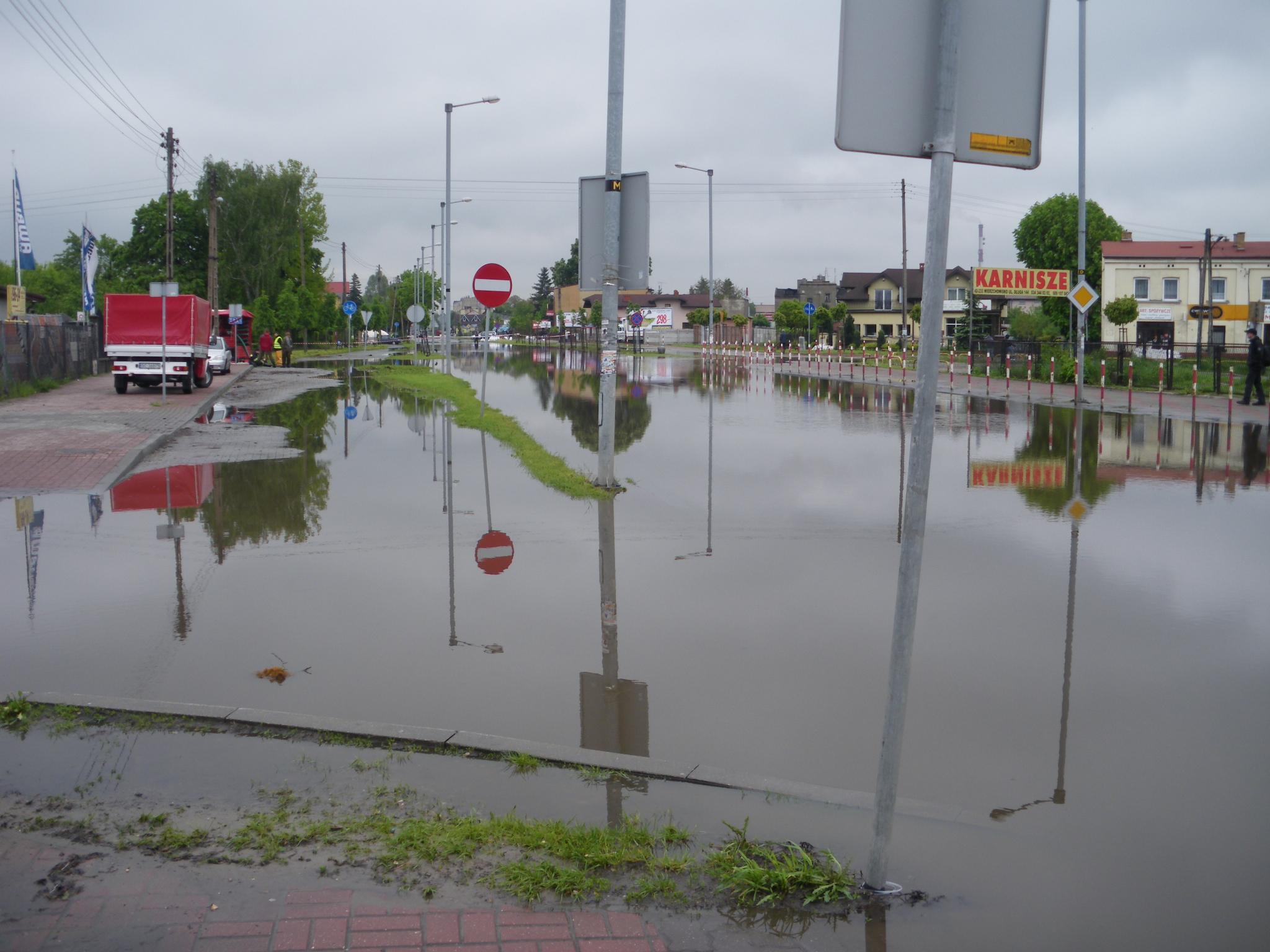
The Zawodzie district in Częstochowa, May 19

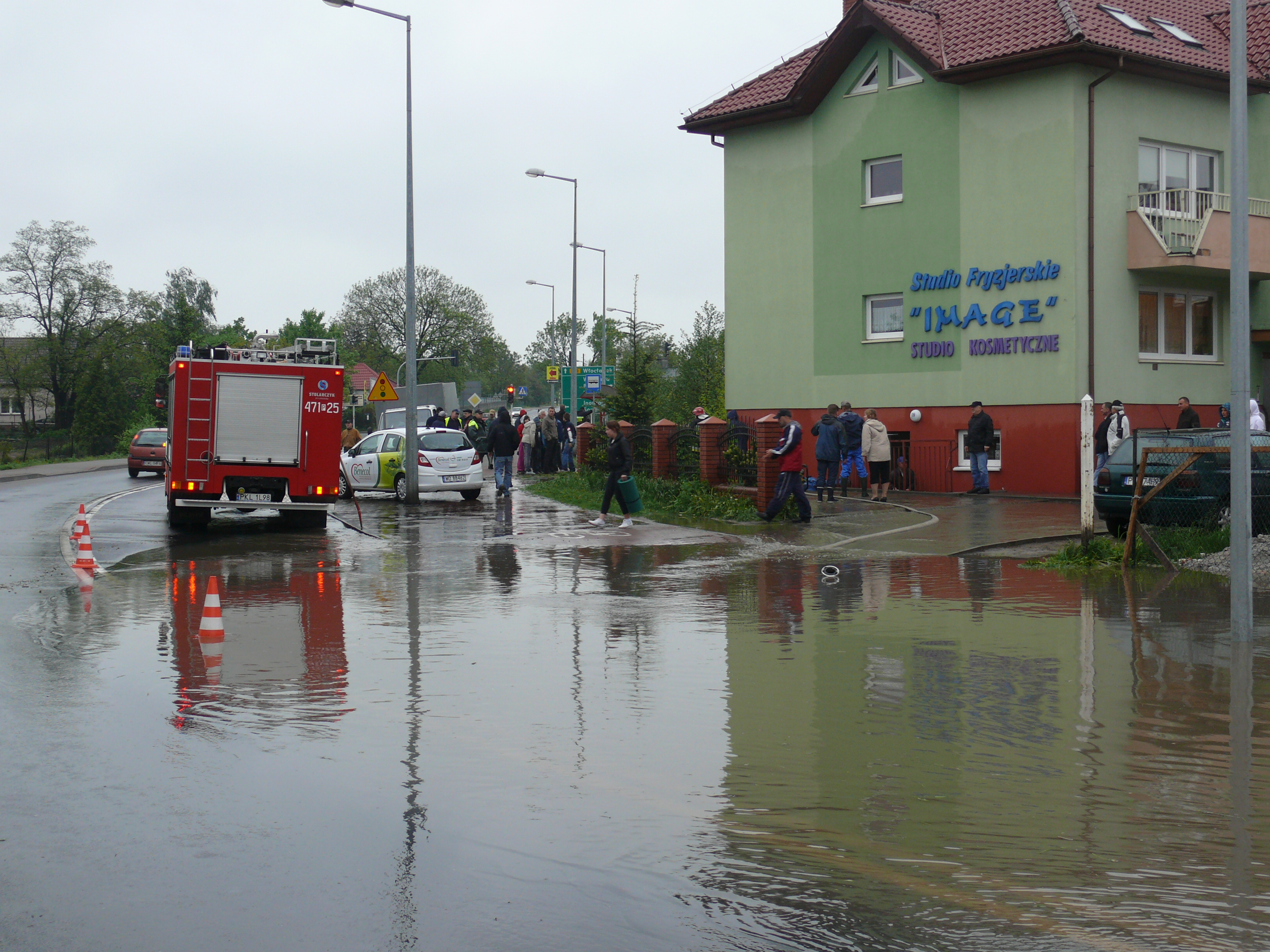
flooded Włocławska street in Koło, Poland

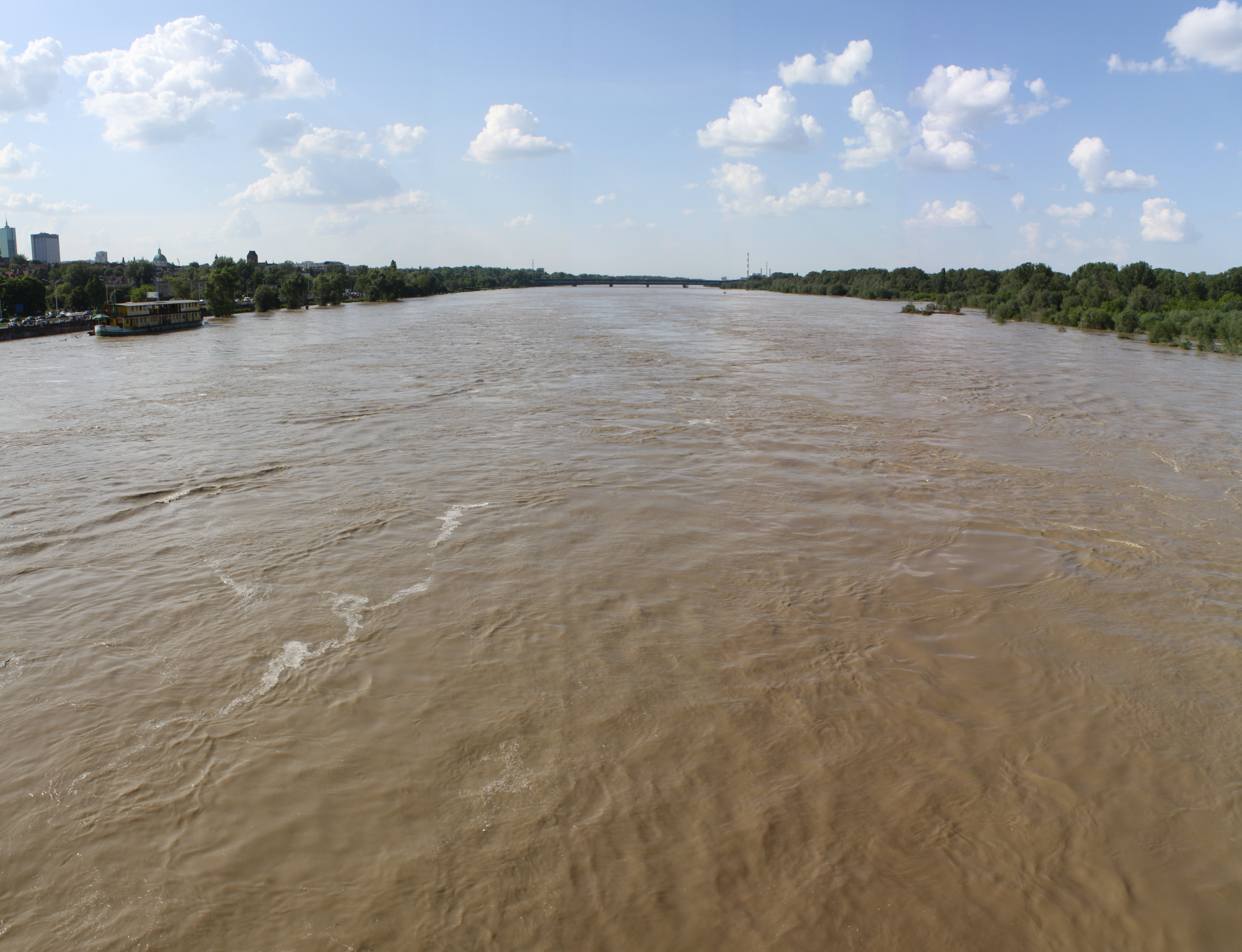
Vistula in Warsaw, Poland on May 21

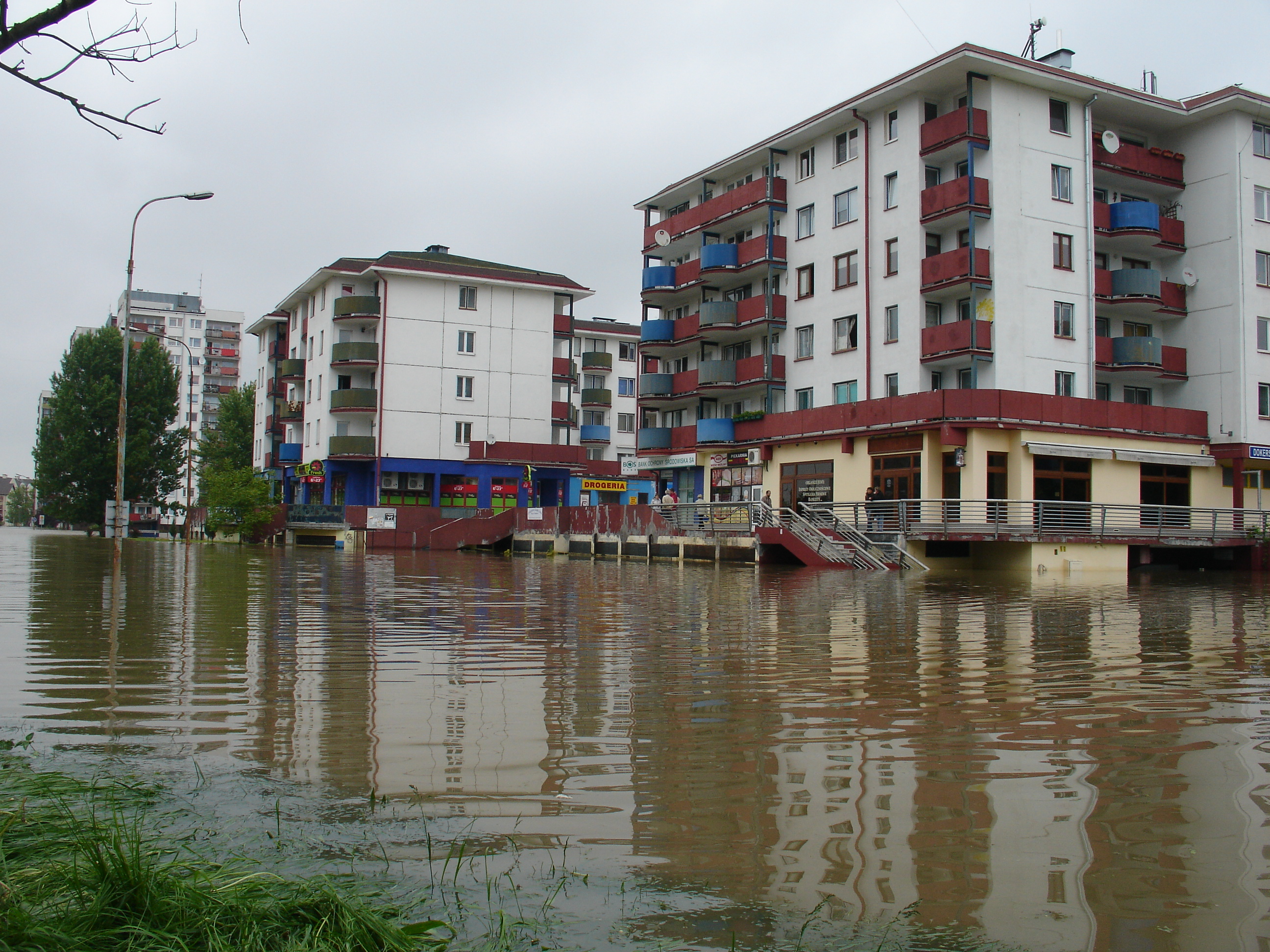
Kozanów district in Wrocław, Poland on May 23
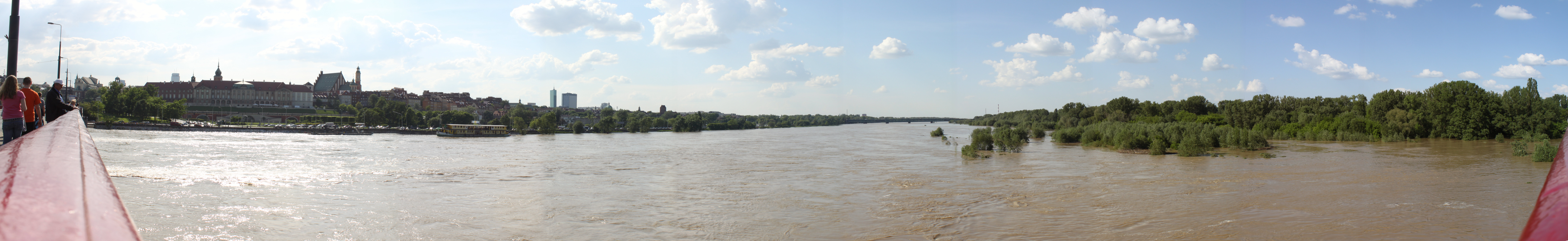
Vistula in Warsaw
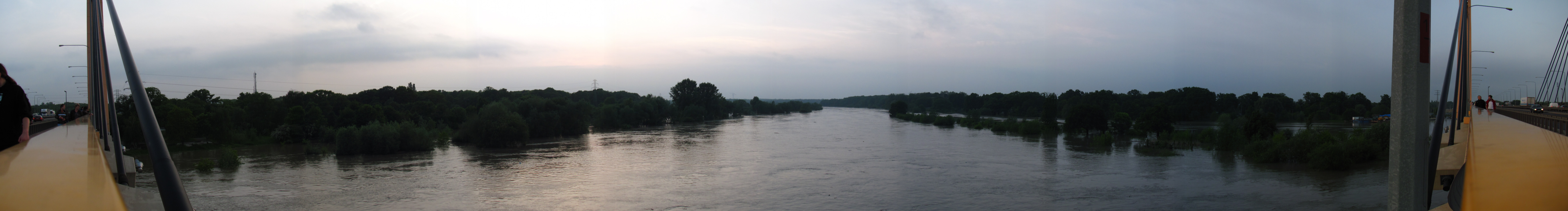
Oder in Wrocław

== See also ==
- 2010 Romanian floods
- 2010 Slovenia floods
- 2010 Var floods
- European floods: 2002, 2005, 2006, 2009
- European Flood Alert System
- Floods directive
- Global storm activity of early 2010
