= Sady =

Sady may refer to:

== Places in Poland ==
- Sady, Lower Silesian Voivodeship (south-west Poland)
- Sady, Podlaskie Voivodeship (north-east Poland)
- Sady, Łódź Voivodeship (central Poland)
- Sady, Lublin Voivodeship (east Poland)
- Sady, Płock County in Masovian Voivodeship (east-central Poland)
- Sady, Przysucha County in Masovian Voivodeship (east-central Poland)
- Sady, Gmina Czosnów, Nowy Dwór County in Masovian Voivodeship (east-central Poland)
- Sady, Poznań County in Greater Poland Voivodeship (west-central Poland)
- Sady, Wągrowiec County in Greater Poland Voivodeship (west-central Poland)
- Sady, Opole Voivodeship (south-west Poland)
- Sady, Warmian-Masurian Voivodeship (north Poland)

== Given name ==
- Sady Courville (1905–1988), American Cajun fiddler
- Jude Ellison Sady Doyle (born 1982), American feminist author
- Sady Rebbot (1935–1994), French actor
- Sady Zañartu (1893–1983), Chilean writer

== See also ==
- Sady, Leningrad Oblast, a settlement in Leningrad Oblast, Russia
- Sadie (disambiguation)
