= Włocławek Reservoir =

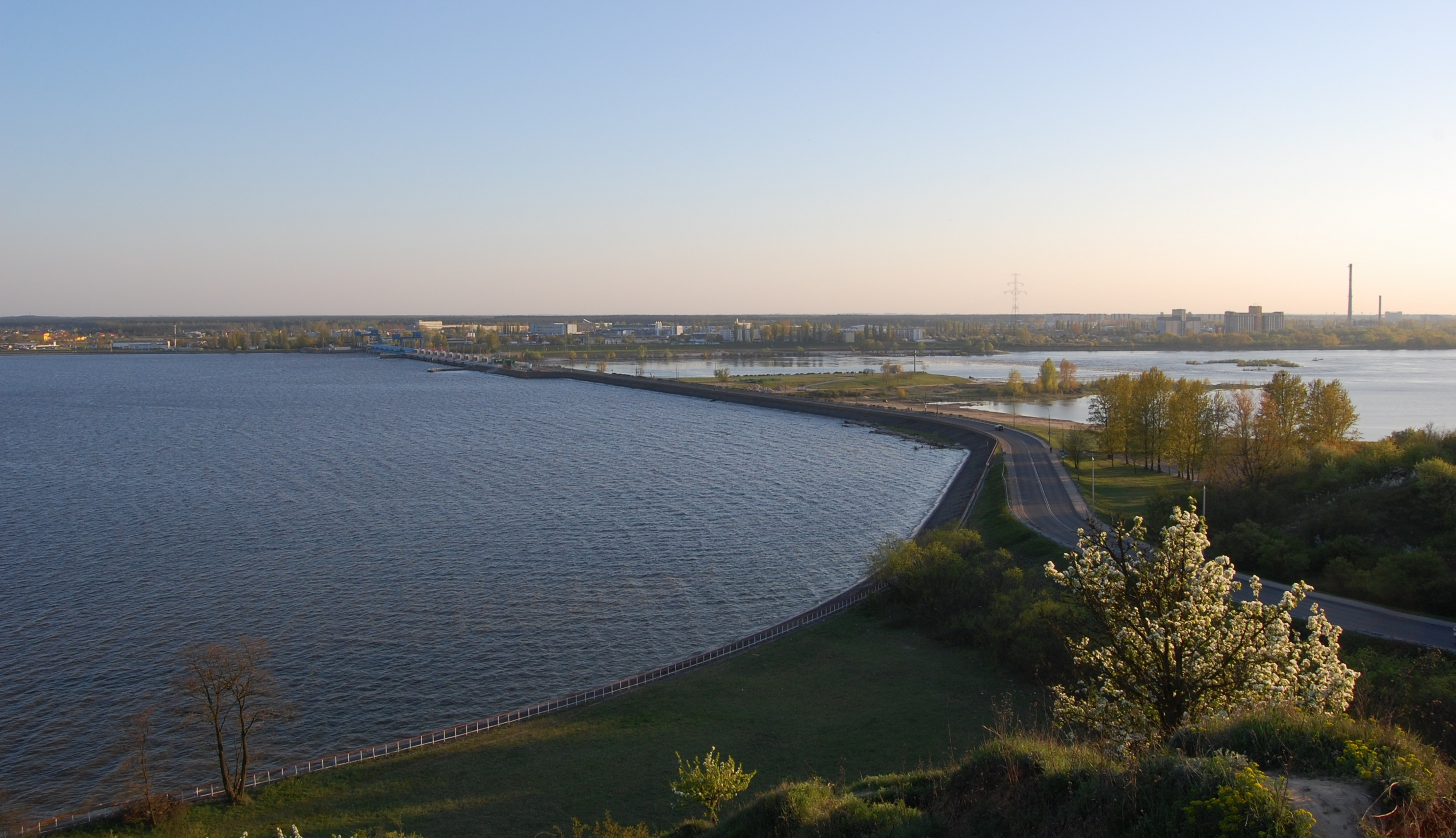

- Location within Kuyavian-Pomeranian Voivodeship
- Location: Kuyavian-Pomeranian Voivodeship
- Coordinates: 52°37′04″N 19°24′28″E
- Type: Hydroelectricity Reservoir
- Primary inflows: Vistula
- Primary outflows: Vistula
- Basin countries: Poland

Włocławek Reservoir (Polish: Zbiornik Włocławski) is a water body in the Middle Vistula flow that appeared in 1970 after building of the dam in Włocławek. The length of the reservoir is 58 km from Włocławek to Płock, average width is 1.2 km. It is the biggest reservoir in Poland.

Due to the significant amount of organic matter in the tank (approx. 11.5% of the dry weight of sediment), it emits approx. 400 mg of methane per area of 1 m^{2} (which is approx. 27% of the total amount of gases emitted from the sediment of average 3114 ml m^{−2} d^{−1}). For this reason, is considered an important source of greenhouse gases emission.

== Functions ==
The tank has three basic functions:

- Retention - during floods, water on the Vistula River reservoir retains a large part of the floodwaters;
- Energy - on the dam is Wloclawek hydroelectric power plant;
- Tourism - Lake Wloclawski developed following tourist centers: Zarzeczewo, Wistka Kings, Soczewka, Murzynowo.

== Flood protection ==
Wloclawek reservoir tank is essentially instantaneous. From approx. 2004. In the event of high water levels acts as a storage reservoir.

=== Flood 2010 ===
On 17 May at the dam in Wloclawek thrown water (3,000 m³/s), preparing for the arrival of the flood wave. 22 May inflow was 6,000 m³/s, a snapshot already amounted to 5700 m³/s. During the climax assumed dump 6,300 m³/s. May 23, at 14 the culmination wave reached Wloclawek, but the water level was lower than expected initially, due to the rupture of a dam in the village of Świniary under Płock iem.

=== Flood 2014 ===
During the flood Vistula May 22, 2014 r. To Włocławski Reservoir affect 4900 m³/s, the discharge was at that time 4300 m³/s. As a result, they managed to flatten the wave of flood and reduce the risk of flooding in the lower section of the Vistula.
