= Sadie =

Sadie may refer to:

== People and fictional characters ==
- Sadie (given name), including a list of people and fictional characters with the given name or nickname
- Sadie, a pen name of Sarah Williams (poet) (1837–1868), English poet
- Carlü Sadie (born 1997), South African rugby union player
- Christian Sadie (born 1997), New Zealand para swimmer
- Eben Sadie, winemaker of the South African wine producer The Sadie Family
- Johann Sadie (born 1989), South African rugby union player
- Stanley Sadie (1930–2005), British musicologist

== Music ==
- Sadie (band), a Japanese rock band
- "Sadie" (Alkaline Trio song), a song on the album Crimson by Alkaline Trio
- "Sadie", a song by Hound Dog Taylor and The Houserockers
- "Sadie", a song by Joanna Newsom on the album The Milk-Eyed Mender
- "Sadie" (The Spinners song)
- Sadie (album), a 1968 album by Johnny Farnham
  - "Sadie (The Cleaning Lady)", a song from the album

== Other uses ==
- Sadie (novel), a 2018 novel by Courtney Summers
- Sadie (dog), a Labrador Retriever awarded the Dickin Medal in 2007
- Sadie (film), an American drama film

== See also ==
- Sadies, a genus of spiders
- Sexy Sadie (disambiguation)
- Sady (disambiguation)
