= Juliszew =

- Village
- Location within Poland
- Coordinates: 52°24′44″N 19°52′34″E
- Country: Poland
- Voivodeship: Masovian
- County: Płock
- Gmina: Słubice

Juliszew [juˈliʂɛf] is a village in the administrative district of Gmina Słubice, within Płock County, Masovian Voivodeship, in east-central Poland.
