= Leonów, Płock County =

Leonów
- Village
- Location within Poland
- Coordinates: 52°24′06″N 19°55′08″E
- Country: Poland
- Voivodeship: Masovian
- County: Płock
- Gmina: Słubice

Leonów [lɛˈɔnuf] is a village in the administrative district of Gmina Słubice, within Płock County, Masovian Voivodeship, in east-central Poland.
