= Słubice, Masovian Voivodeship =

Słubice
- Village
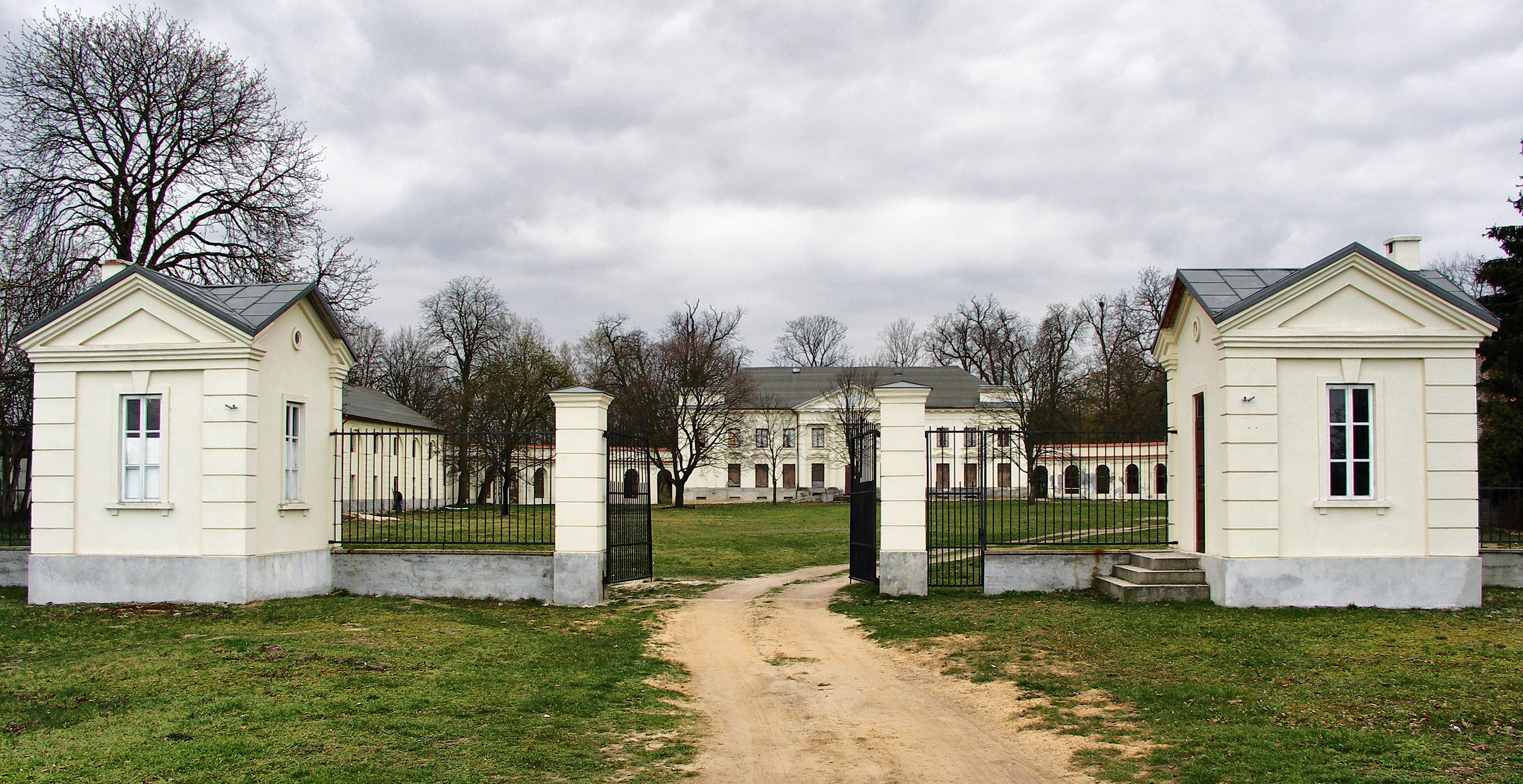
- Palace in Słubice

- Location within Poland
- Coordinates: 52°22′8″N 19°56′14″E
- Country: Poland
- Voivodeship: Masovian
- County: Płock
- Gmina: Słubice
- Population: 2,200
- Time zone: UTC+1 (CET)
  - Summer (DST): UTC+2 (CEST)
- Vehicle registration: WPL

Słubice [swuˈbit͡sɛ] is a village in Płock County, Masovian Voivodeship, in central Poland. It is the seat of the gmina (administrative district) called Gmina Słubice.

== Sights ==
The historic landmarks of the village are the palace, formerly owned by the Mikorski, Potocki, Skrażyński and Grzybowski noble families, and the Saint Martin church.

== Sports ==
The local football club is Mazowia Słubice. It competes in the lower leagues.
