= The Cross Monument to Father Jerzy Popiełuszko =

Monument in Włocławek, Poland

Coordinates: 52.3937858°N 19.750851°E

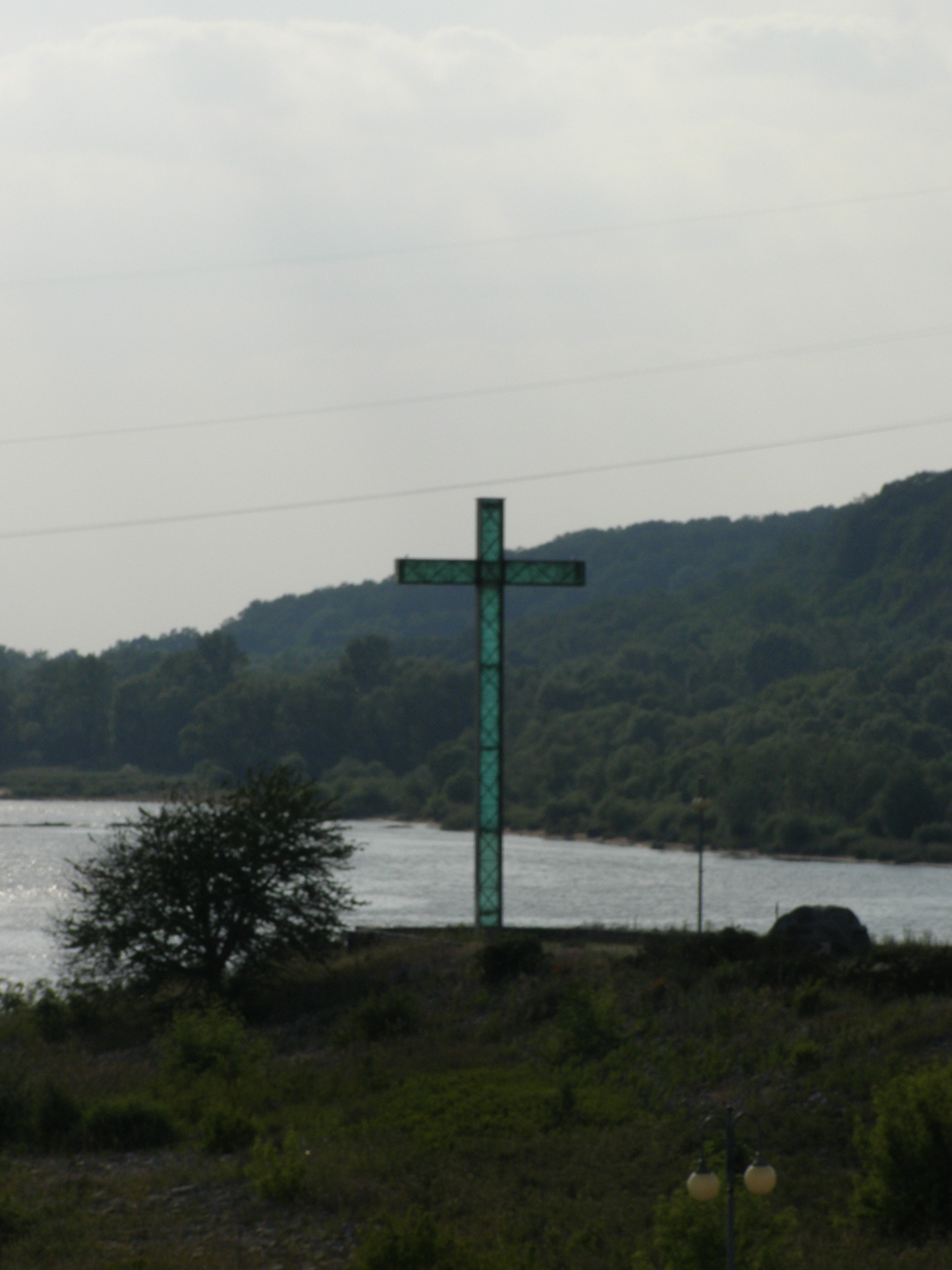
The Cross Monument to Father Jerzy Popiełuszko

The Cross Monument to Father Jerzy Popiełuszko is a monument in the form of a cross, located next to the dam in Włocławek, at the site where the body of the murdered priest Jerzy Popiełuszko was found, erected to commemorate his martyrdom at the hands of the communist Security Service (PRL). It was created on the initiative of the bishops of Włocławek, Jan Zaręba and Henryk Muszyński. It was consecrated on 7 June 1991 by Pope John Paul II. The monument was designed by artists Jerzy Kalina and Andrzej Krawczyk.

== Monument ==
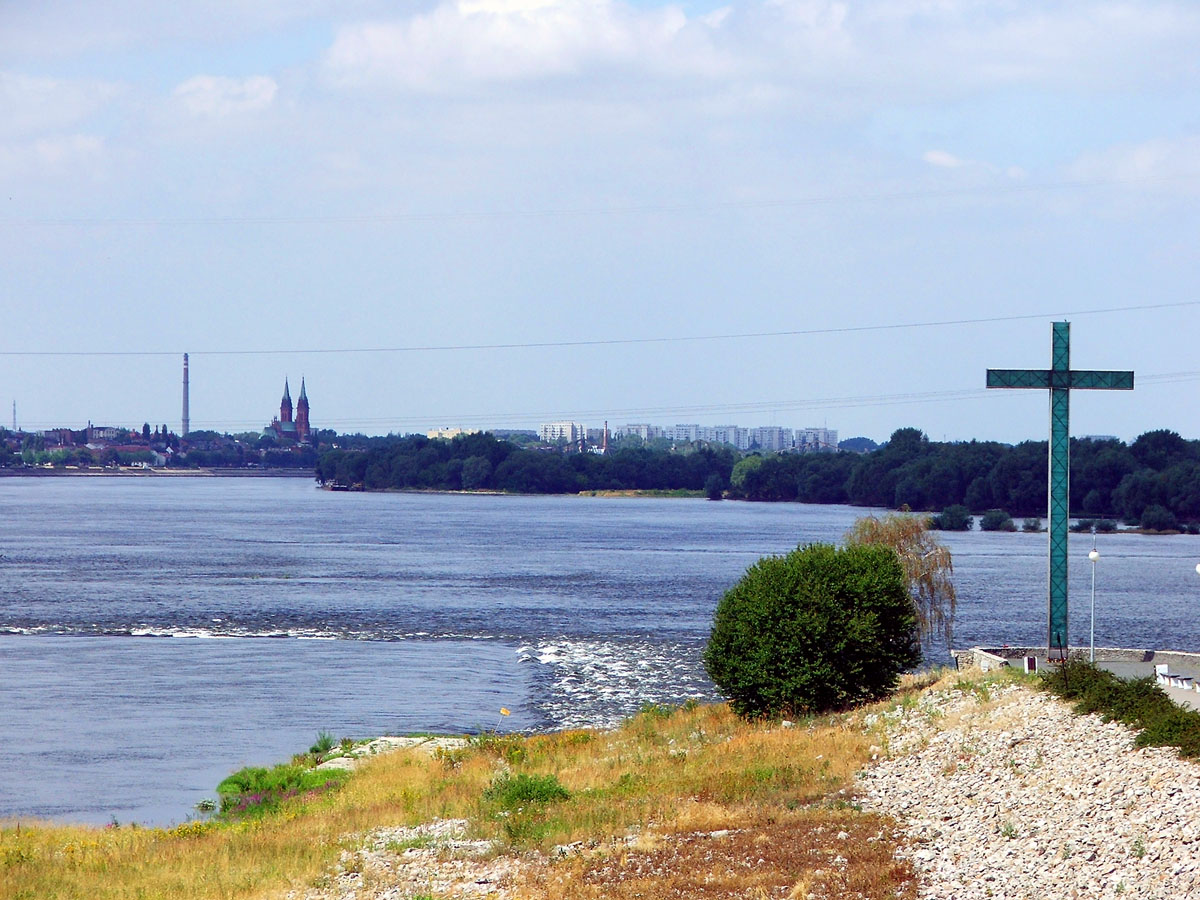
The cross monument to Father Jerzy Popiełuszko in Włocławek. Panorama.

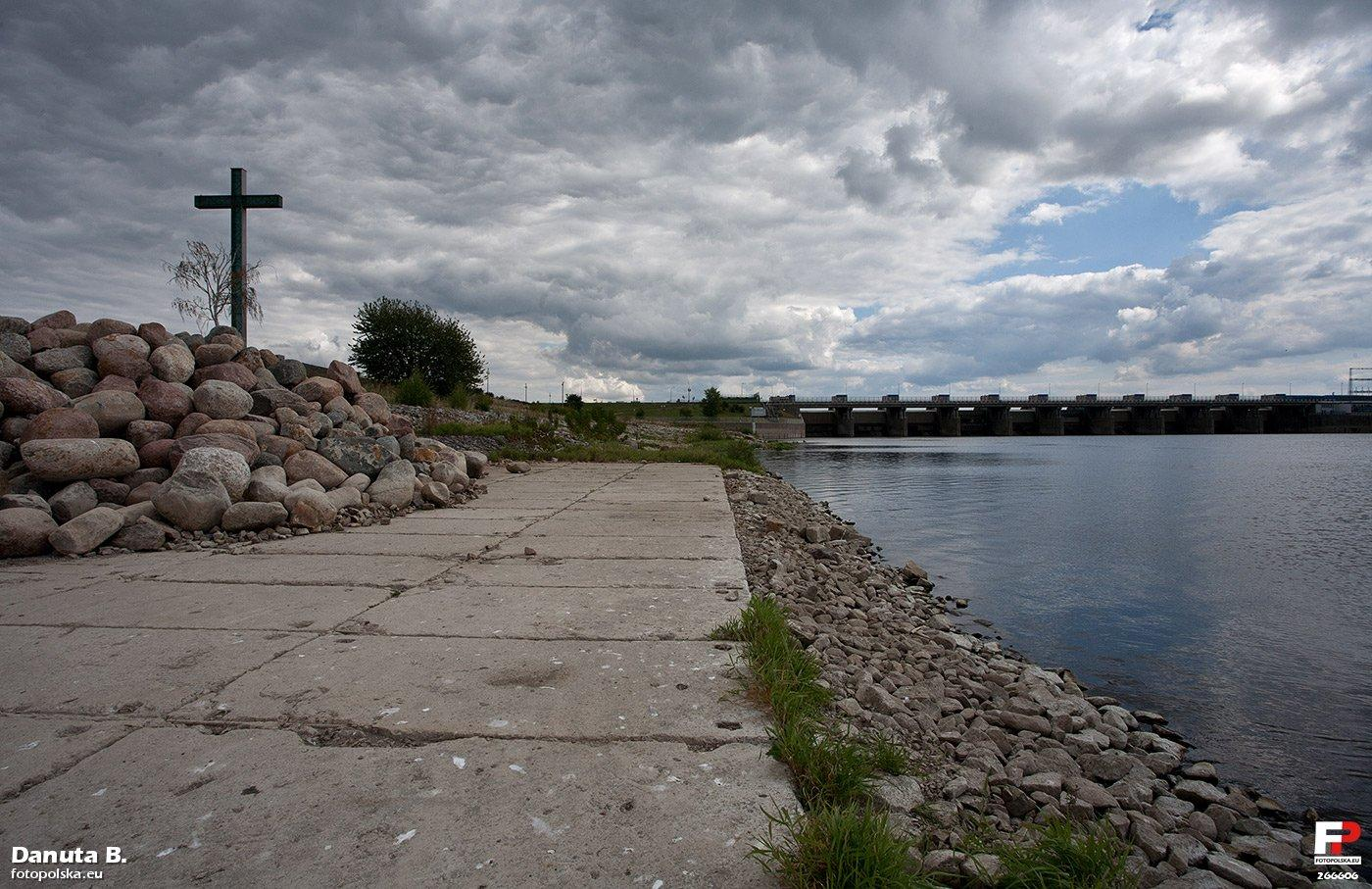
Włocławek. View of the cross and dam. fotopolska.eu

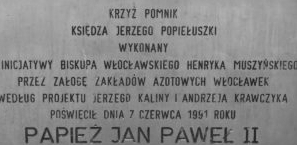
Plaque on the Cross Monument to Father Popiełuszko in Włocławek

It is a several-metre-high metal and glass structure designed by Jerzy Kalina and Andrzej Krawczyk. It was originally intended to stand next to the dam as a monument to the martyrdom of Father Jerzy Popiełuszko. The cross monument was made at the request of Bishop Henryk Muszyński by employees of the Włocławek Nitrogen Works.

It was erected on a peninsula at the foot of the Włocławek dam. It is illuminated from the inside at night.

The first cross was to be erected here as early as 1984, after the crime against the priest was revealed. On 13 November 1984, Bishop Jan Zaręba sent a letter with such a request to the governor of Włocławek. However, a positive decision was only issued after several years of efforts. Fifty months after the first request, on 3 February 1989, the same provincial governor of Włocławek issued a positive decision on commemorating the place of death of Father Jerzy Popiełuszko with a cross.

On 6 June 1991, Pope John Paul II consecrated the cross during his pilgrimage to Poland in Włocławek. On 19 October 1991, the Cross – a monument commemorating the martyrdom of the Solidarity chaplain – was unveiled and blessed.

The celebrations were presided over by the Primate of Poland, Józef Glemp. Participants included President Lech Wałęsa, representatives of the Polish Sejm and government, Polish bishops, Father Jerzy's parents Marianna and Władysław Popiełuszko, his immediate family, friends and colleagues, colour guards from the Solidarity trade union from across the country, and the faithful.

The literary and musical programme was performed by well-known actors and artists from Warsaw stages: Hanna Skarżanka, Joanna Szczepkowska, Piotr Szczepanik, Andrzej Łapicki, Jerzy Zelnik, and Andrzej Szczepkowski. They recited works by Cyprian K. Norwid – "Ale Ty Jeden Dobry i Jedyny" ("But You Are the Only Good One"), Stanisław Wyspiański's "Wyzwolenie" (“Liberation”), Juliusz Słowacki's ‘Tak mi Boże dopomóż’ ("So Help Me God") and "Testament mój" ("My Testament"). Excerpts from speeches by John Paul II in Białystok (5 June 1991) and Włocławek (7 June 1991) were played.

The Mass was concelebrated by Primate Józef Glemp together with Apostolic Nuncio Józef Kowalczyk and the bishops..

Jerzy Kalina made a film about the creation of the Cross Monument to Father Jerzy Popiełuszko entitled Tama 1984-1991 (Dam 1984–1991).

== See also ==
- Tomb of Blessed Father Jerzy Popiełuszko
- Statue of Jerzy Popiełuszko (Toruń)
