= Grabowiec, Płock County =

Grabowiec
- Village
- Location within Poland
- Coordinates: 52°21′43″N 19°55′30″E
- Country: Poland
- Voivodeship: Masovian
- County: Płock
- Gmina: Słubice

Grabowiec [ɡraˈbɔvjɛt͡s] is a village in the administrative district of Gmina Słubice, within Płock County, Masovian Voivodeship, in east-central Poland.
