= Rybaki, Masovian Voivodeship =

Rybaki
- Village
- Location within Poland
- Coordinates: 52°25′14″N 19°56′23″E
- Country: Poland
- Voivodeship: Masovian
- County: Płock
- Gmina: Słubice
- Time zone: UTC+1 (CET)
  - Summer (DST): UTC+2 (CEST)
- Vehicle registration: WPL

Rybaki [rɨˈbaki] is a village in the administrative district of Gmina Słubice, within Płock County, Masovian Voivodeship, in central Poland.
