= Statue of Jerzy Popiełuszko (Toruń) =

Monument in Toruń, Poland

Coordinates: 53.031°N 18.364°E

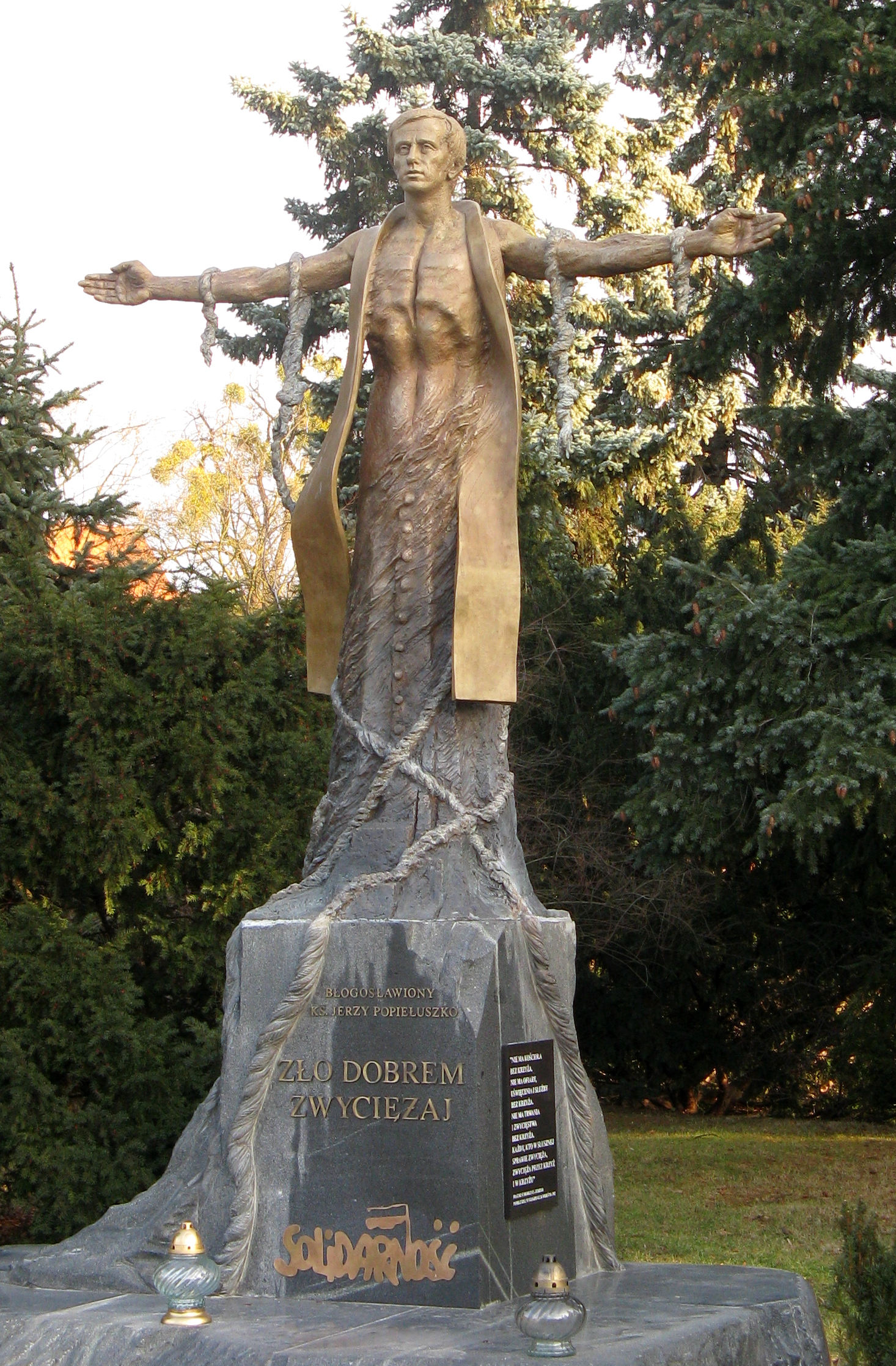
Statue of Jerzy Popiełuszko.

The statue of Jerzy Popiełuszko in Toruń (Polish: pomnik Jerzego Popiełuszki) is a monument in Toruń, Poland, dedicated to Jerzy Popiełuszko, a 20th-century Roman Catholic priest, chaplain of the Warsaw Solidarity movement, who was murdered by officers of the Security Service. The monument was unveiled on 19 October 2011, on the 27th anniversary of Father Jerzy Popiełuszko's death.

The monument is located on Jana Pawła II Avenue, not far from the Józef Piłsudski Road Bridge.

The monument was unveiled on 19 October 2011 during the celebrations of the 27th anniversary of the priest's death. The design was created by Kazimierz Gustaw Zemła, the sculptural work was done by Paweł Pietrusiński, and the casting work by Marek Żebrowski. The construction was financed, among others, by funds from the City of Toruń and the Marshal's Office.

The height of the statue, including the base, is approximately 5 metres. The monument depicts Father Popiełuszko standing with his arms outstretched. At the foot of the statue is the motto: "Overcome evil with good." There are two inscriptions on the pedestal:

- There is no Church without the cross. There is no sacrifice, sanctification, or service without the cross. There is no endurance or victory without the cross. Everyone who triumphs in a just cause triumphs through the cross and in the cross (on the right side of the pedestal; the quote is an excerpt from Fr. Popiełuszko's sermon of 26 September 1982);
- To the chaplain of Solidarity, martyr, steadfast witness of Christ – Social Committee for the Construction of the Monument to Father Jerzy Popiełuszko in Toruń, Local Government of the Kujawsko-Pomorskie Province, Municipality of Toruń (on the back of the pedestal).

== See also ==
- The Cross Monument to Father Jerzy Popiełuszko
- Monument commemorating the kidnapping and assassination of Father Popiełuszko
- Monument to Jerzy Popiełuszko in Tarnobrzeg
