= Zyck Nowy =

- Village
- Location within Poland
- Coordinates: 52°24′00″N 19°55′00″E
- Country: Poland
- Voivodeship: Masovian
- County: Płock
- Gmina: Słubice
- Time zone: UTC+1 (CET)
  - Summer (DST): UTC+2 (CEST)
- Vehicle registration: WPL

Zyck Nowy is a village in the administrative district of Gmina Słubice, within Płock County, Masovian Voivodeship, in central Poland.
