= Łaziska, Płock County =

Łaziska
- Village
- Location within Poland
- Coordinates: 52°23′07″N 19°53′11″E
- Country: Poland
- Voivodeship: Masovian
- County: Płock
- Gmina: Słubice

Łaziska [waˈʑiska] is a village in the administrative district of Gmina Słubice, within Płock County, Masovian Voivodeship, in east-central Poland.
