= Gmina Słubice, Masovian Voivodeship =

Gmina Słubice Słubice Commune
- Gmina
- Coat of arms
- Interactive map of Gmina Słubice
- Coordinates (Słubice): 52°22′8″N 19°56′14″E
- Country: Poland
- Voivodeship: Masovian
- County: Płock County
- Seat: Słubice

Area
  - Total: 94.47 km^{2} (36.48 sq mi)

Population (2006)
  - Total: 4,556
  - Density: 48.23/km^{2} (124.9/sq mi)
- Time zone: UTC+1 (CET)
  - Summer (DST): UTC+2 (CEST)
- Vehicle registration: WPL

Gmina Słubice is a rural gmina (administrative district) in Płock County, Masovian Voivodeship, in central Poland. Its seat is the village of Słubice, which lies approximately 26 kilometres (16 mi) south-east of Płock and 75 km (47 mi) west of Warsaw.

The gmina covers an area of 94.47 square kilometres (36.5 sq mi), and as of 2006 its total population is 4,556.

== Villages ==
Gmina Słubice contains the villages and settlements of Alfonsów, Budy, Grabowiec, Grzybów, Jamno, Juliszew, Łaziska, Leonów, Nowosiadło, Nowy Wiączemin, Nowy Życk, Piotrkówek, Potok Biały, Rybaki, Sady, Słubice, Świniary, Wiączemin Polski, Wymyśle Polskie and Życk Polski.

== Neighbouring gminas ==
Gmina Słubice is bordered by the gminas of Bodzanów, Gąbin, Iłów, Mała Wieś, Sanniki and Słupno.
