= Piotrkówek, Masovian Voivodeship =

Piotrkówek
- Village
- Location within Poland
- Coordinates: 52°23′N 19°57′E
- Country: Poland
- Voivodeship: Masovian
- County: Płock
- Gmina: Słubice

Piotrkówek [pjɔtrˈkuvɛk] is a village in the administrative district of Gmina Słubice, within Płock County, Masovian Voivodeship, in east-central Poland.
