= Trześniówka =

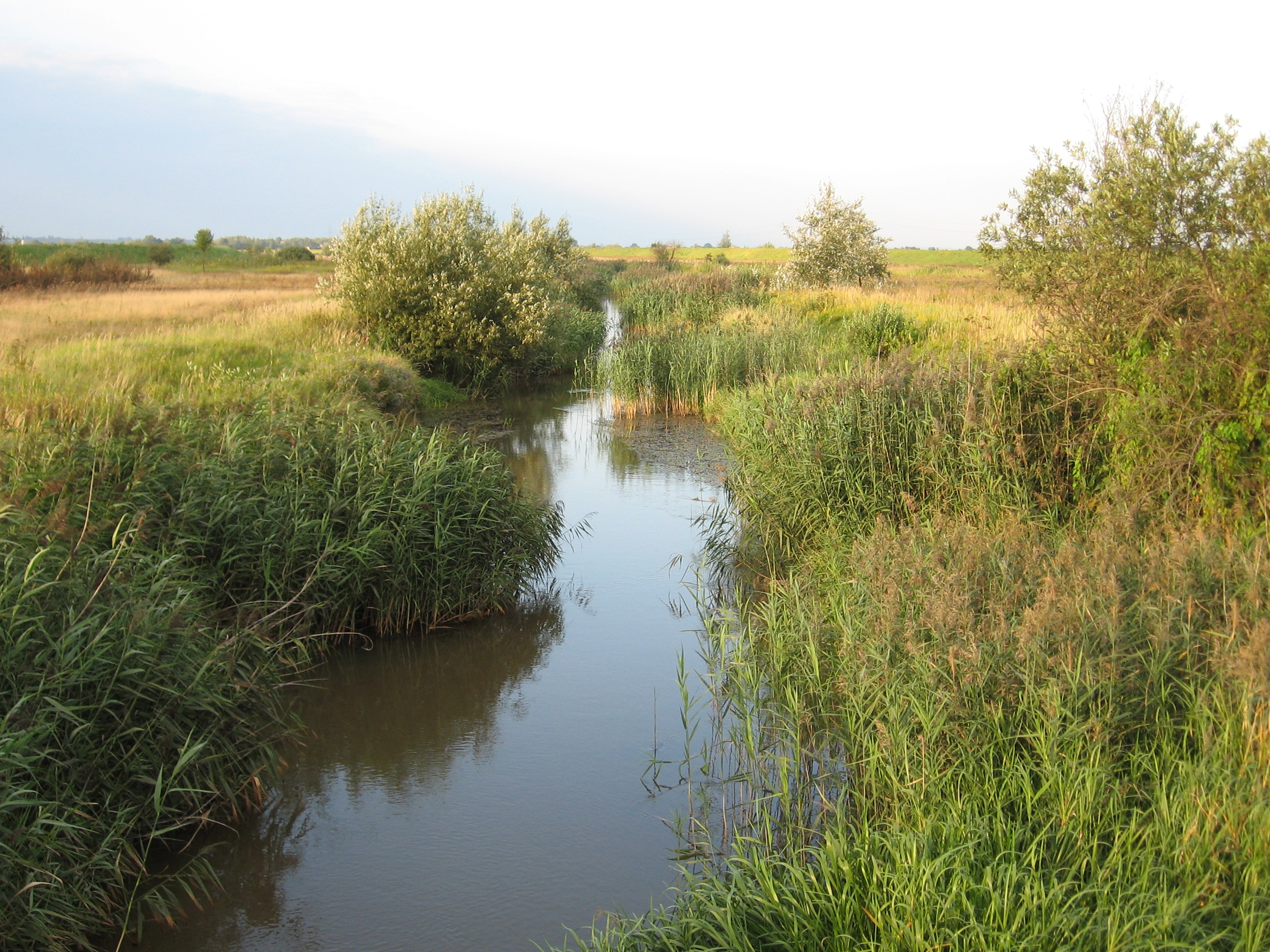
- Trześniówka in Trześń

- Location within Poland Location within Świętokrzyskie Voivodeship

Location
- Country: Poland
- Voivodeship: Podkarpackie, Świętokrzyskie

Physical characteristics
- Mouth
  - location: Vistula
  - coordinates: 50°40′52″N 21°47′54″E
- Length: 56.26 km (34.96 mi)
- Basin size: 569.6 km^{2} (219.9 sq mi)

Basin features
- Progression: Vistula→ Baltic Sea

The Trześniówka is a river in Poland, and a right-bank tributary of the Vistula (near the city of Sandomierz). Its length is 56.9 km with a basin area of 569.6 km². During the Central European floods in June 2010, the Trześniówka flooded parts of Sandomierz.

== See also ==
- Rivers of Poland
