= Monument to Jerzy Popiełuszko (Tarnobrzeg) =

Monument in Tarnobrzeg, Poland

Coordinates: 50.344248°N 21.41362°E

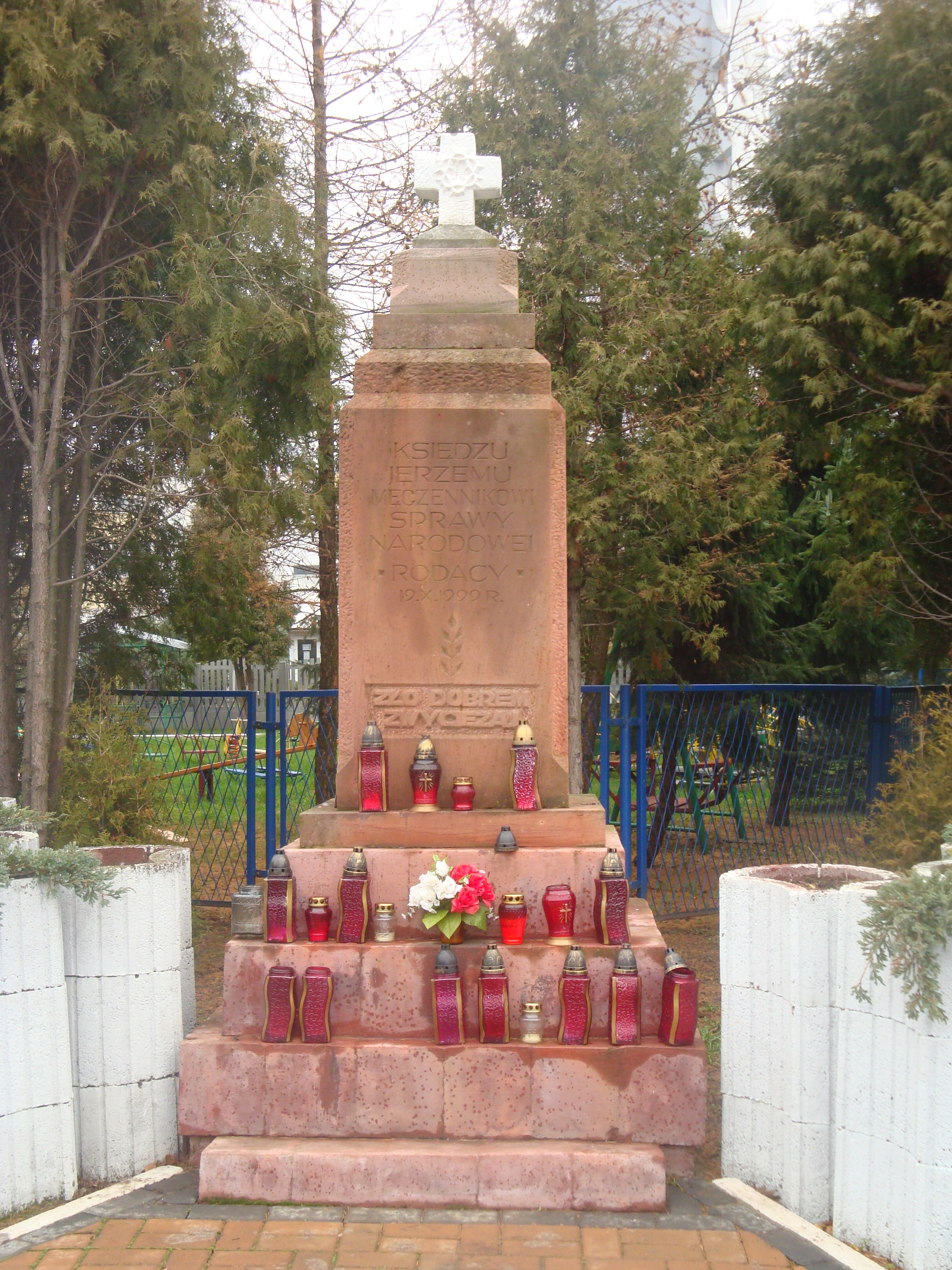
Father Jerzy's monument in Tarnobrzeg.

The Jerzy Popiełuszko Monument in Tarnobrzeg is a monument erected in 1999 commemorating the figure of blessed priest Jerzy Popiełuszko. The monument was unveiled on the 15th anniversary of the death of the chaplain of the Warsaw Solidarity. The small obelisk bears the inscription: “To Father Jerzy, martyr of the national cause, Compatriots, October 19, 1999, Overcome evil with good.”

The monument is located a few dozen meters from the Church of Our Lady of Perpetual Help in Tarnobrzeg, on Konstytucji 3 Maja Street.

== See also ==
- Statue of Jerzy Popiełuszko (Toruń)
