= Budy, Płock County =

Budy
- Village
- Location within Poland
- Coordinates: 52°23′N 19°51′E
- Country: Poland
- Voivodeship: Masovian
- County: Płock
- Gmina: Słubice

Budy [ˈbudɨ] is a village in the administrative district of Gmina Słubice, within Płock County, Masovian Voivodeship, in east-central Poland.
