= Jamno, Masovian Voivodeship =

Jamno
- Village
- Location within Poland
- Coordinates: 52°20′27″N 19°58′14″E
- Country: Poland
- Voivodeship: Masovian
- County: Płock
- Gmina: Słubice

Jamno [ˈjamnɔ] is a village in the administrative district of Gmina Słubice, within Płock County, Masovian Voivodeship, in east-central Poland.
