= Hydroelectric power plant in Włocławek =

Polish power plant

Coordinates: 52.6545°N 19.1337°E

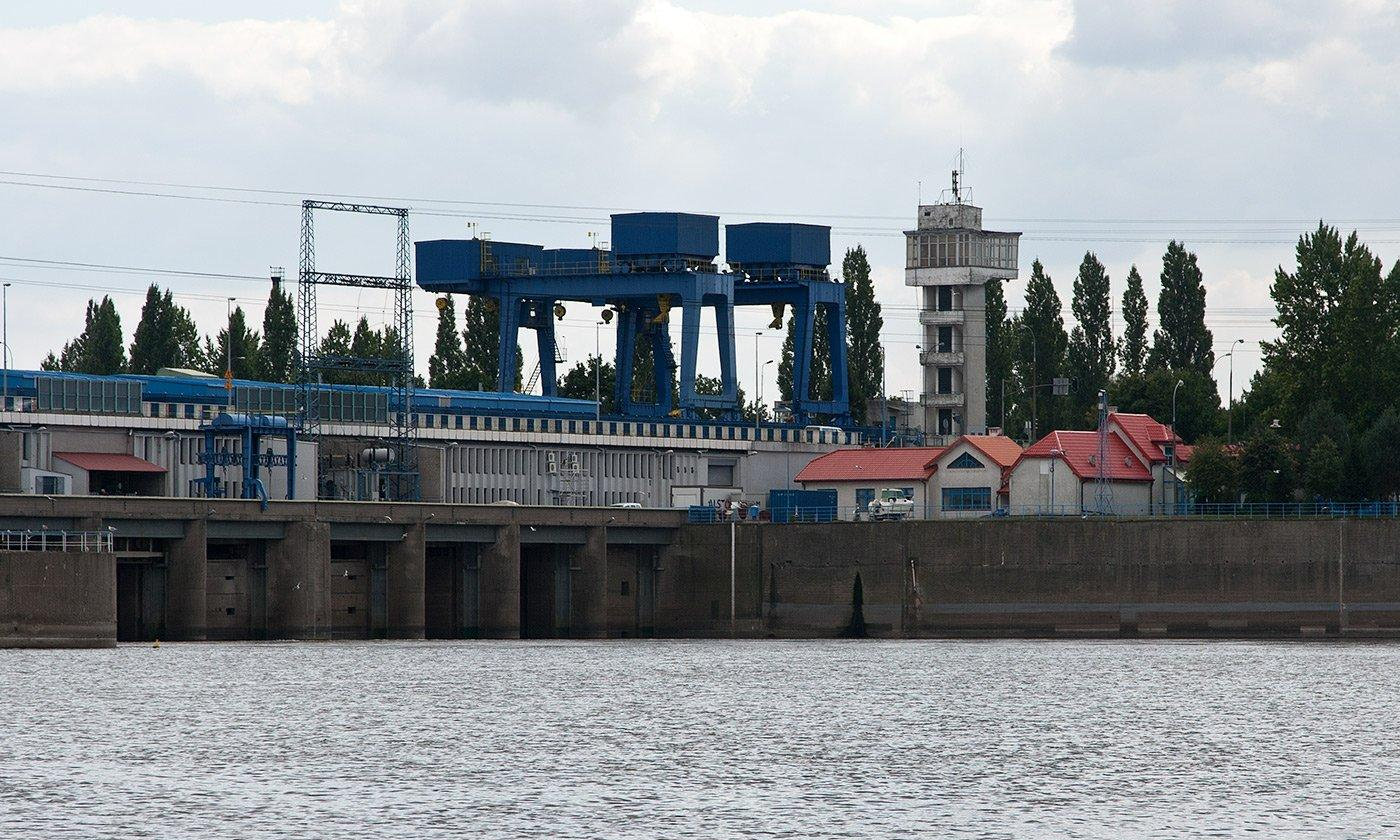
Power plant from the west side

The hydroelectric power plant in Włocławek is the largest run-of-the-river hydroelectricity power plant in Poland. As a result of the construction of the power plant, a dam lake was created on the Vistula (Włocławek Reservoir). Initially it was supposed to be an element of the cascade of hydropower plants of the lower Vistula, but the other dams were never built.

The site is associated with the assassination of Jerzy Popiełuszko, including body disposal and discovery.

== History ==
The barrage was built in the years 1962–1970. At the beginning, the Włocławek power plant was managed by the Northern District Power Plant Complex in Straszyn. In 1973, the Włocławek Hydroelectric Power Plant District was established. It was dissolved in 1976 and its management transferred directly to the Toruń Power Plant. On 1 March 1998, a private limited company called “Hydroelectric Power Plant in Włocławek” was established, which formally existed until 12 March 2013. After years of numerous transformations of Energa Group companies, the company responsible for the Włocławek power plant is now Energa Wytwarzanie S.A.

=== Body discovery of Father Jerzy Popiełuszko ===
On 19 October 1984, the beaten to death body of Father Jerzy Popiełuszko was recovered at the site after being thrown from the dam down to the Vistula River. The news of the murder deeply shocked public opinion in the country and around the world. Next to the dam, there is a tall papal cross commemorating the assassination of Father Jerzy. In addition to the cross, the sanctuary is also built near the site that also commemorates the assassination as well.

== Technical specifications ==
- River: Vistula
- Location: 674,850 km (419,330 mi)
- Year of construction: 1970
- Piling: 57.3 m (188 ft) AMSL
- Head: 8.8 m (29 ft)
- Number of hydrosets: 6
- Turbine type: Kaplan turbine
- Installed power: 160.2 MW
- Installed flow: 2,190 m^{3}/s (77,000 cu ft/s)
- Average production: 739 GWh per year

== Technical difficulties ==
After the construction of the water barrage and the entire power plant in 1970, the dam was planned to operate for 10–15 years. During this time, in the lower part of the Vistula River, another dams (hydroelectric power plants) were to be built. Due to economic problems there were no funds to build the remaining power plants. The dam, despite its deteriorating technical condition, still continues to operate.

It was only in the early 1990s that attention was drawn to the problem of the dam. First reports issued at that time said that the structure could tip over, causing a serious disaster. In order to prevent the dam from collapsing, it was planned to build a hydroelectric power plant in Nieszawa, which would relieve the burden of the outdated structure. In 2012, the proposal for this location was withdrawn, and it was finally decided that an additional dam (power plant) would be built in Siarzewo, on the 708th kilometer of the Vistula river.

In 2015, after 3 years of work, at a cost of over 115 million PLN, the reconstruction and renovation of the Włocławek dam was completed. However, this has not solved the problem of the erosion of the riverbed further down the Vistula – the construction of an additional barrage in Siarzewo has not yet started, and it is now assumed that work may start in 2020, if all the necessary administrative decisions can be obtained earlier (the project to build the new barrage is not supported by all the scientists).

== Environmental impact of the power plant ==
The reservoir was built on the area of the former natural river system, which can still be found on the Vistula between Wyszogród and Płock. Flooding of this part of the river caused the loss of many valuable habitats of plants and animals residing in this type of environment.

One of the many effects of the construction was that it made almost impossible for anadromous fish to wander up the Vistula river basin. During the last reconstruction of the dam the fish pass was rebuilt. According to the person responsible for its functioning, the fish pass works much better than the old structure, and the computer system scans, monitors, and registers all flowing fish, collecting data on their quantity and species. In addition to the negative effects of the construction of the power plant, positive environmental changes should also be noted in the areas surrounding the dam. Water damming has improved the water supply in areas with low precipitation. It is commonly assumed that the energy coming from the dam is clean in the sense of no emission of poisonous or greenhouse gases.

However, according to some activists fighting for environmental protection (including Adam Wajrak), the dam is far from being ecological. Some also argue that in terms of greenhouse gas emissions, the existence of the hydroelectric power plant in Włocławek has a significant impact on the environment – due to the significant amount of organic matter in the reservoir, it emits about 400 mg/m^{2} of methane per day.

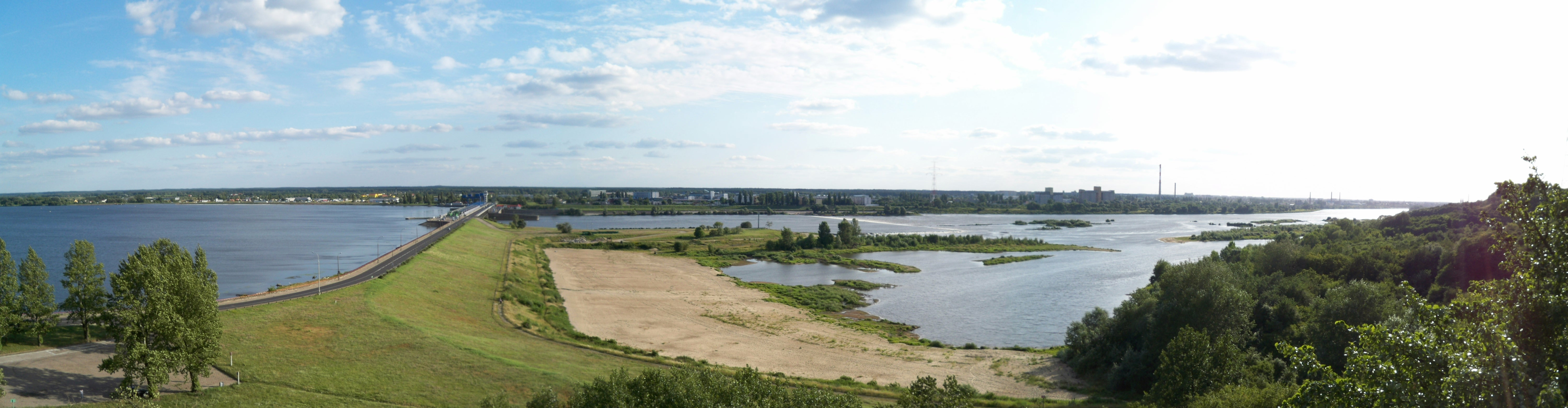
The dam – general view

== Rebuilding of the fish pass ==
In 1970, a year after the completion of the dam, a fish pass with a flow of 0.935 m^{3}/s was launched, consisting of 33 chambers. The research carried out in the years 1971–1974 showed that fish can overcome the barrage, but the number of sea trout using the fish pass is disproportionately small in relation to the size of the stock. Over time, the conditions of the fish pass worsened. During the first two years from its launch, deep erosion of the channel caused the bed to drop by 2.5 m. The situation was to be improved by a stone threshold, which was built at the entrance to the fish pass to stop the erosion. However, on the basis of research carried out in the years 1998–2004, it turned out that this solution worsened the location of the entrance to the pass. As a result, only 3.5% of the fish entering the pass could swim through the whole structure.

In 2014, the pass was rebuilt and, according to reports, the migration of sea trout and vimba improved. The new fish pass consists of 60 chambers, a flow rate of 0.59 m^{3}/s and a slope between chambers equal to 0.22 m (for comparison, the slope in the old pass was 0.4 m).

=== Fish surveillance ===
Monitoring devices were installed to monitor fish migration. One of them is the Riverwatcher fish counter installed in the 49th chamber, made of two plates arranged parallel to each other. They emit or receive infrared light beams. The fish passing between the plates crosses the light beams, hence its shape is known. The meter is also equipped with a camera. The second monitoring device is a fish trap installed in chamber 60. The fish pass is additionally equipped with a pipeline attracting fish to the trap.

Essentials for the proper functioning of the fish pass:

- constant verification of water level in water level gauges;
- control of water inlet points;
- control of water inlet to the baiting pipeline;
- control of structural elements inside the pass.
