= Nowosiadło =

- Village
- Location within Poland
- Coordinates: 52°26′N 19°55′E
- Country: Poland
- Voivodeship: Masovian
- County: Płock
- Gmina: Słubice

Nowosiadło [nɔvɔˈɕadwɔ] is a village in the administrative district of Gmina Słubice, within Płock County, Masovian Voivodeship, in east-central Poland.
