= Grzybów, Płock County =

Grzybów
- Village
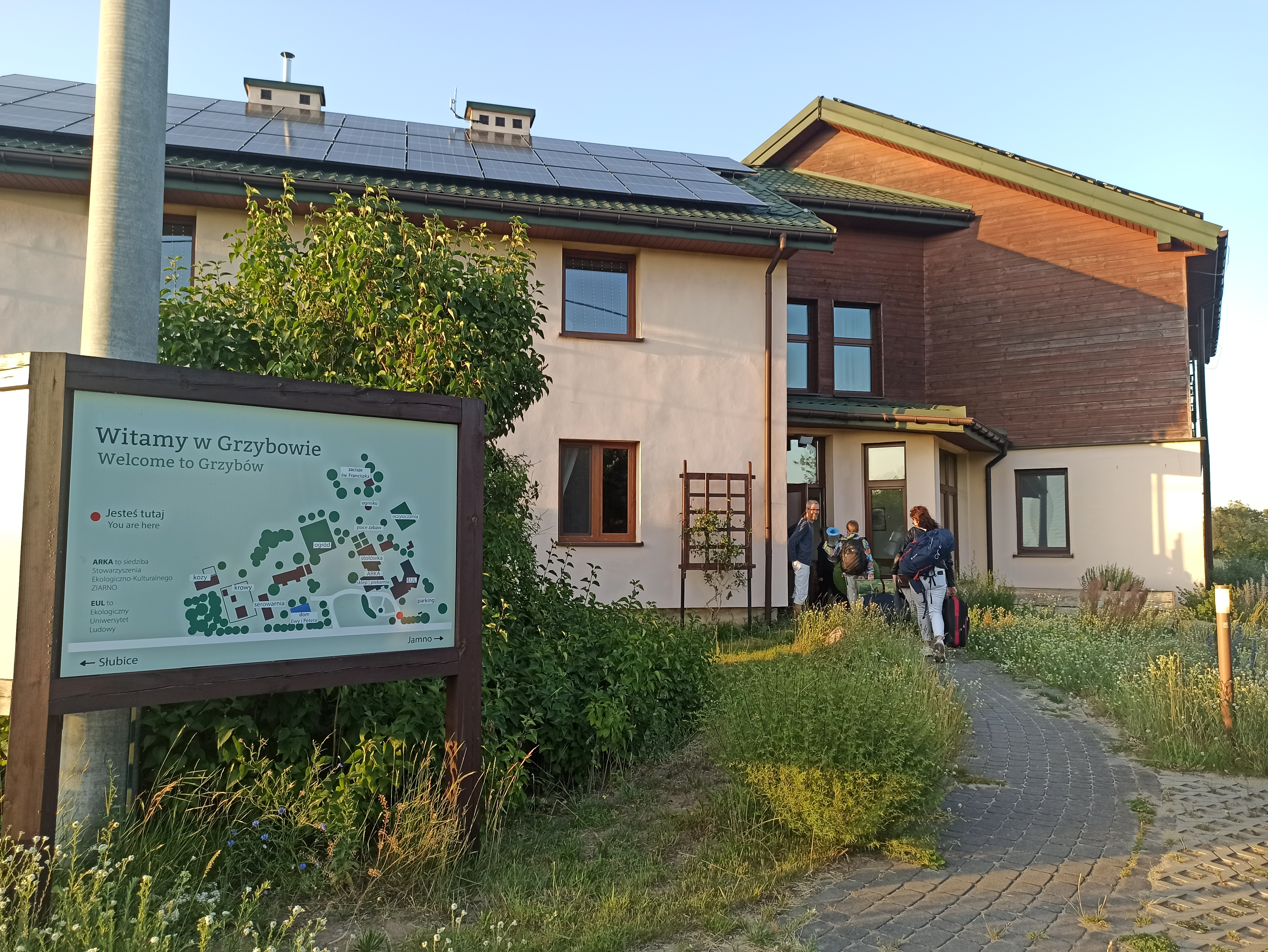
- Environmental Folk University (Ekologiczny Uniwersytet Ludowy) in Grzybów

- Location within Poland
- Coordinates: 52°21′27″N 19°58′11″E
- Country: Poland
- Voivodeship: Masovian
- County: Płock
- Gmina: Słubice

Grzybów [ˈɡʐɨbuf] is a village in the administrative district of Gmina Słubice, within Płock County, Masovian Voivodeship, in east-central Poland.
