= Nowy Wiączemin =

Village in Gmina Słubice, Poland

- Village
- Location within Poland
- Coordinates: 52°27′00″N 18°51′00″E
- Country: Poland
- Voivodeship: Masovian
- County: Płock
- Gmina: Słubice

Nowy Wiączemin [ˈnɔvɨ vjɔnˈt͡ʂɛmin] (German: Deutsch Gensemin) is a village in the administrative district of Gmina Słubice, within Płock County, Masovian Voivodeship, in east-central Poland.
