= Sadie M. Callan =

American advertising agency owner (1886–1970)

Sadie Marie Hainline Callan
- Born: April 14, 1886; Emporia, Kansas, U.S.
- Died: January 26, 1970 (aged 83); Los Angeles, California, U.S.
- Resting place: Forest Lawn Memorial Park (Glendale)
- Occupations: Advertising agency owner, publicity manager, campaign manager
- Organizations: Business and Professional Women’s Club, Woman’s Advertising Club
- Known for: Developer of the California Style Center Inc.
- Spouse: George E. Callan (m. 1907–1949)
- Children: Emilyn M. Callan and Ruth Mary Chenowith

Sadie Marie Hainline Callan (April 14, 1886 – January 26, 1970) was an advertising agency owner and a publicity and campaign manager. She was also the developer of the California Style Center Inc.

== Early life ==
Sadie Marie Hainline was born on April 14, 1886, in Emporia, Kansas, the daughter of Baxter Richard Hainline (1841-1922) and Sarah E. Hainline.

== Career ==
Sadie M. Callan did considerable newspaper work starting in 1908. She was connected with the Advertising Department of the Los Angeles Evening Herald.

She was the field secretary of the California Clinic for Crippled and Defective Children.

She was a member of the Business and Professional Women's Club and the Woman's Advertising Club.

In 1936 Callan purchased 26 acres of land in Baldwin Park, California to build a style center for the manufacture of clothing and shoes. The plans included 100 new homes and a hotel with swimming pool. She also built several buildings for her own use. Several affiliated needlework industries occupied adjoining buildings. Associates of Callan were listed as Al Rosink and Herman Kotz. The complex was estimated to employ 2550 persons.

== Personal life ==
Sadie M. Callan moved to California in 1922 and lived at 1811 Gower St., Los Angeles, California.

On August 28, 1907, Sadie M. Hainline married George E. Callan (1886-1949), and they had two children: Emilyn M. Callan (1908-1932) and Ruth Mary Chenowith

She died on January 26, 1970, and is buried at Forest Lawn Memorial Park (Glendale).
