= Sadie Cecelia Annenberg =

American philanthropist (1879–1965)

Sadie Cecelia Friedman Annenberg (1879–1965) was a philanthropist, wife of newspaper publisher Moe Louis Annenberg, and mother of nine children. She was often involved in helping her husband with business decisions and in building their fortune.

One of her well known mottos was “If you love something, you will find a way to care for it, whether it is a person or an institution.”

== Early life ==
Sadie Cecelia Friedman was born in New York City on June 3, 1879, to Tina and Morris Friedman, a Jewish retail shoe salesman. She married Moses (Moe) Louis Annenberg, on August 20, 1899.

Sadie and Moe had nine children. Their one son was publisher and philanthropist Walter Annenberg; their seven daughters were: Diana Annenberg, who died as a child (1900–1905), Esther Annenberg Simon Levee (1901–1992), Janet Annenberg Kahn Neff Hooker (1904–1997), Enid Annenberg Haupt (1906–2005), Lita Annenberg Hazen (1909–1985), Evelyn Annenberg Jaffe Hall (1911–2005), and Harriet Beatrice Annenberg Ames Aronson (1914–1976).

In 1907, the Annenbergs moved from Chicago to Milwaukee, so that Moe could expand his newspaper distribution agency. The Milwaukee Newsstand Distribution Company joined his Chicago Newsstand Distribution Company to promote circulation of Hearst newspapers. Sadie contributed her jewelry to a pawn shop to help fund this venture, so that they could take a smaller loan.

Sadie is credited with inspiring their teaspoon mail-order business that made the Annenbergs millionaires by their thirties. When Moe asked her what women were always missing she answered, "teaspoons." Thus evolved the idea of selling teaspoons with U.S. state seals on the handles. It started with state seals of Wisconsin and other nearby states and, as women ordered more, it quickly expanded to all 50 states and Canada. The entire family was involved with the children wrapping the teaspoons in decorative paper and ribbons.

In 1923 Moe created the Cecelia Corporation, named after his wife. Its assets at the time included the Daily Racing Form, the Morning Telegraph in New York City, and The Philadelphia Inquirer, a daily newspaper based in Philadelphia. In the 1940s it was renamed as Triangle Publications.

In 1939, when Moe was indicted by the federal government for tax evasion Annenberg and her daughters were not in court. They waited in a nearby hotel. Her husband's incarceration caused Annenberg great pain, but she weathered the dishonor in silence.

== Philanthropy ==
Sadie Annenberg was an active philanthropist, particularly in the fields of medicine, education, and the arts. She participated in the establishment of the department of pediatrics at Albert Einstein College of Medicine She also helped with the establishment of the Annenberg School of Communications at the University of Pennsylvania and the founding of the Sadie C. Annenberg Soil and Irrigation Institute at Gilat, Israel to develop arable land in the Negev.

In the arts, she was the benefactor of the Sadie Cecilia Annenberg Music School of the Williamsburg (Brooklyn) Settlement House. She received the school's gold medal of appreciation in 1956.

Her children continued her philanthropic interests and also made contributions in her honor. In 1962, her family honored her by giving a $1 million unrestricted grant to the Albert Einstein College of Medicine at Yeshiva University in New York City via the M. L. Annenberg Foundation, named after Moe. Shortly after her eighty sixth birthday in June 1965, her children announced a pledge of eight million dollars toward the construction of the twenty three story Mount Sinai School of Medicine in New York, in her honor. The pledge reflected her long standing commitment to medical and educational causes.

== Death ==
Sadie Cecelia Friedman Annenberg died on July 6, 1965, at her home in Manhattan, following a lengthy illness.
