= Sexy Sadie (disambiguation) =

"Sexy Sadie" is a song by the Beatles released in 1968.

Sexy Sadie may also refer to:

- Sexy Sadie (band), a Spanish pop rock group from the island of Majorca
- Susan Atkins, one of the Manson Family killers who went by the name "Sexy Sadie"
