= Sadie Hawkins =

Sadie Hawkins may refer to:

- Sadie Hawkins, a fictional character in the American comic strip Li'l Abner
- Sadie Hawkins dance, a school dance in which female students invite male students
- "Sadie Hawkins" (Glee), an episode of the TV series Glee

== See also ==
- Sadie Hawkins Day, a pseudo-holiday inspired by the fictional character
