= Sady, Płock County =

Village in Gmina Słubice, Poland

Sady
- Village
- Location within Poland
- Coordinates: 52°25′26″N 19°53′11″E
- Country: Poland
- Voivodeship: Masovian
- County: Płock
- Gmina: Słubice
- Time zone: UTC+1 (CET)
  - Summer (DST): UTC+2 (CEST)
- Vehicle registration: WPL

Sady [ˈsadɨ] is a village in the administrative district of Gmina Słubice, within Płock County, Masovian Voivodeship, in central Poland.
