= Świniary, Płock County =

Świniary
- Village
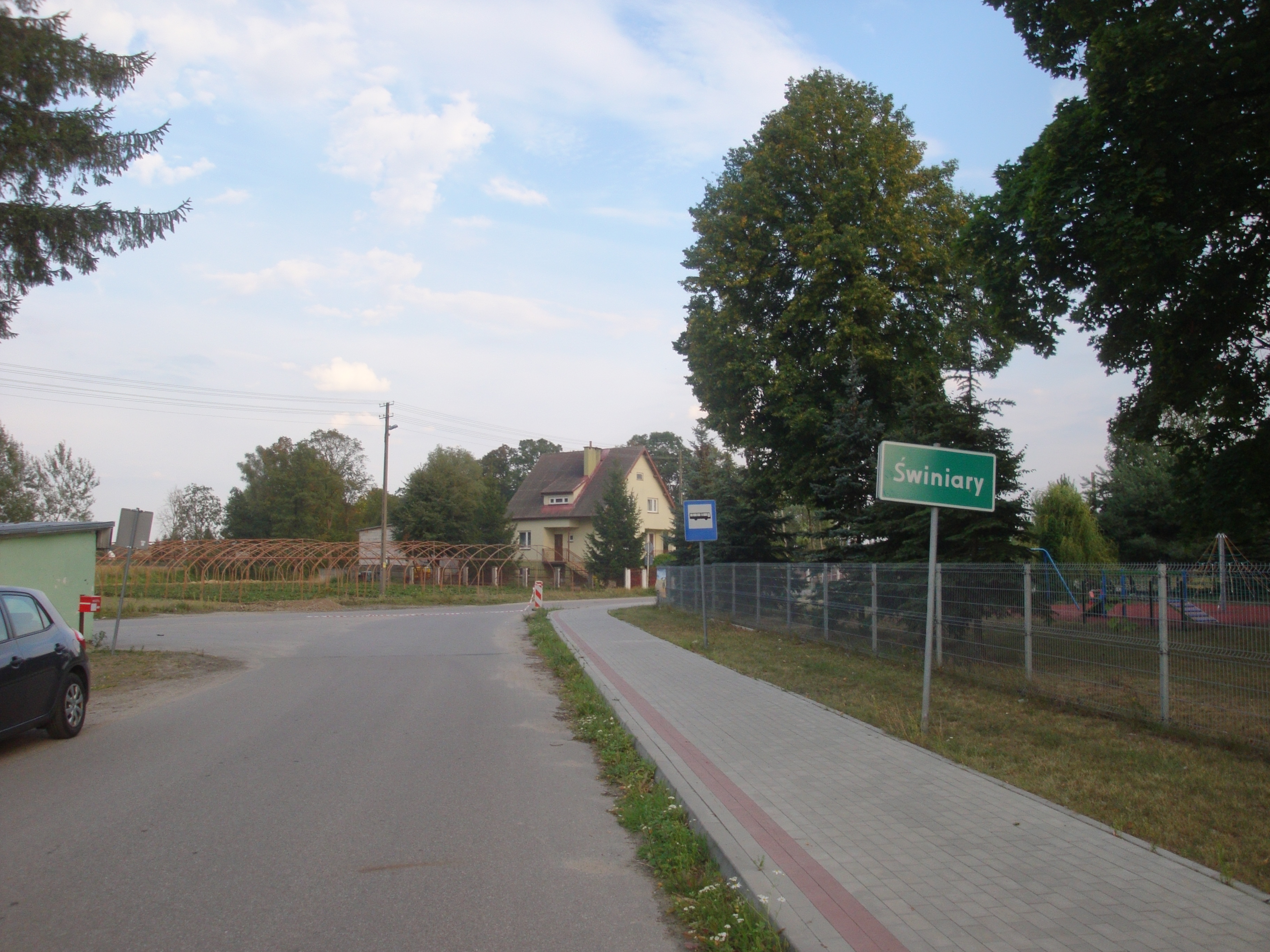

- Location within Poland
- Coordinates: 52°26′8″N 19°54′37″E
- Country: Poland
- Voivodeship: Masovian
- County: Płock
- Gmina: Słubice
- Time zone: UTC+1 (CET)
  - Summer (DST): UTC+2 (CEST)
- Vehicle registration: WPL

Świniary [ɕfiˈɲarɨ] is a village in the administrative district of Gmina Słubice, within Płock County, Masovian Voivodeship, in central Poland.
