= Piano sonatas =

Piano sonatas may refer to:

- Piano sonatas (Beethoven)
- Piano sonatas (Boulez)
- Piano sonatas (Chopin)
