= Piano sonatas (Chopin) =

Sonatas by Chopin

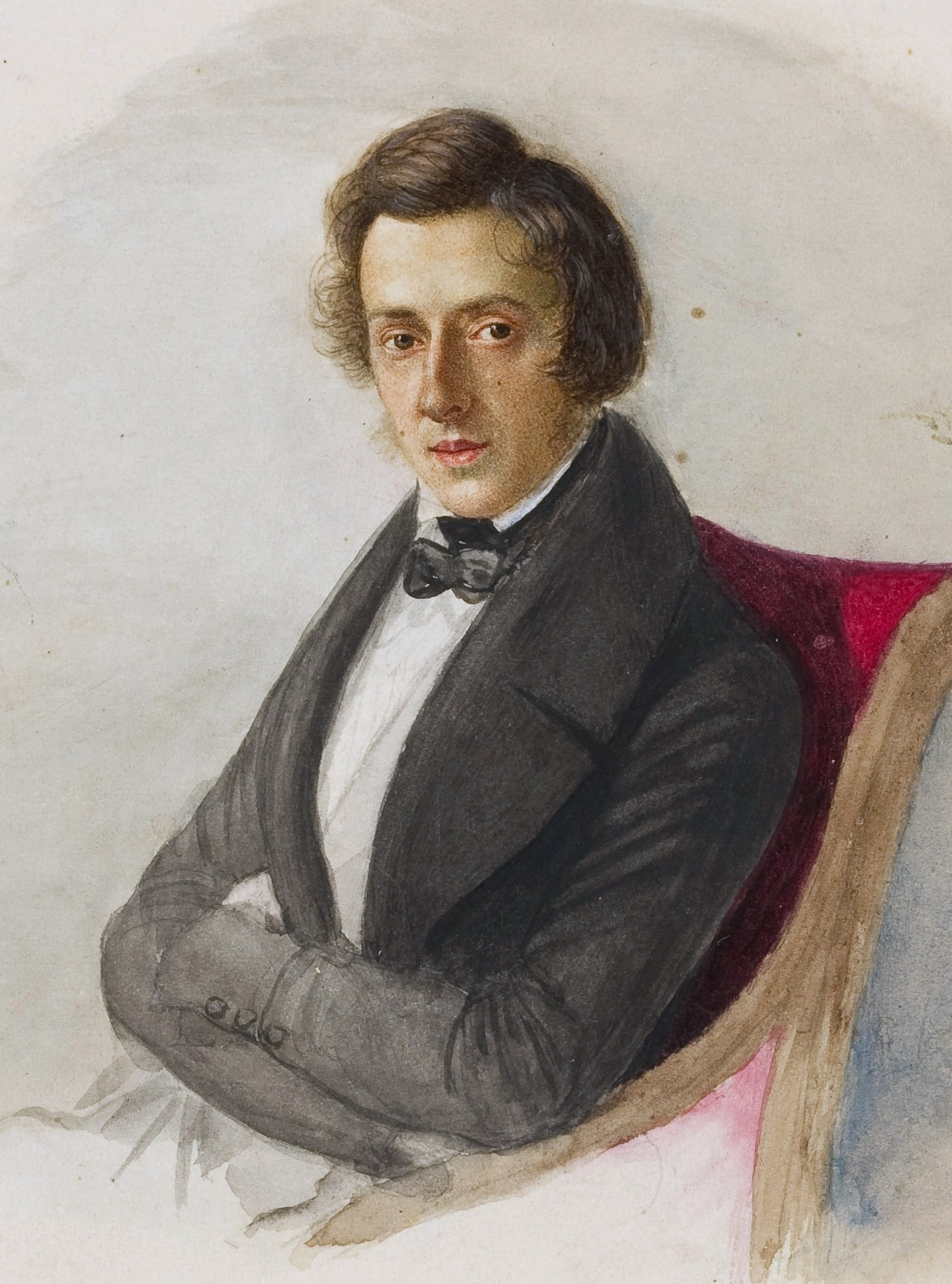
Chopin at 25, by his fiancée Maria Wodzińska, 1835

Frédéric Chopin composed three piano sonatas, two of which were published in his lifetime, one posthumously. They are considered to be among Chopin's most difficult piano compositions both musically and technically. They cover a period of time from 1828 to 1844, reflecting Chopin's style changes.

== Piano Sonata No. 1 in C minor, Op. posth. 4 ==
Chopin composed this piano sonata in 1828, when he was still studying with Józef Elsner, to whom the sonata was dedicated. Despite having a low opus number, this work was published posthumously in 1851 by Tobias Haslinger's son, Carl Haslinger. It is among the least recorded of all of Chopin's works, and is not considered a part of the standard piano repertoire.

This sonata has four movements:

1. Allegro maestoso
2. Menuetto
3. Larghetto
4. Finale: Presto

== Piano Sonata No. 2 in B♭ minor, Op. 35 ==
Chopin composed this sonata in 1839 at Nohant, near Châteauroux in France. However, the third movement, the widely known and popular funeral march, had been composed as early as 1837.

This sonata has four movements:

1. Introduction: Grave – Doppio movimento
2. Scherzo
3. Marche funèbre: Lento
4. Finale: Presto

== Piano Sonata No. 3 in B minor, Op. 58 ==
Chopin composed this sonata in 1844 and dedicated it to Countess Emilie de Perthuis. As his last sonata for solo piano, it has been suggested that this was his attempt to address the criticisms of his earlier Sonata No. 2, Op. 35.

This sonata has four movements:

1. Allegro maestoso
2. Scherzo: Molto vivace
3. Largo
4. Finale: Presto non tanto; Agitato
