= Piotr of Chotków =

Former Bishop of Płock

- Bishop of Płock
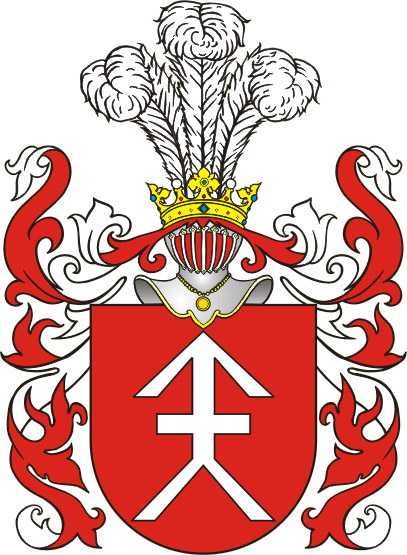
- The purported arms of Piotr
- Predecessor: Casimir III of Płock
- Successor: Jan Lubrański
- Previous post(s): Chancellor to Dukes of Masovia

Orders
- Consecration: by Bishop Andrzej Oporowski

Personal details
- Died: 1497
- Buried: Płock
- Education: Doctor of Medicine
- Alma mater: Kraków Academy, University of Bologna

Piotr of Chotków (d. 1497) was a medieval Polish educator and clergyman who was Bishop of Płock (1480-1497).

== Biography ==
Multiple locations are provided for Piotr's birth. Historian Antoni Julian Nowowiejski indicates the village of Mąkolin near Bodzanów, and the Polish Biographical Dictionary indicates Chotkowo near Bodzanów. Piotr was born into the peasantry, but both Nowowiejski and Samuel Orgelbrand acknowledge that heraldists associate him with the Kościesza coat of arms. Heraldist Adam Boniecki lists Piotr under the Kościesza arms.

Piotr received degrees from the Kraków Academy in 1454 and 1457. After this, he lectured in Kraków before moving to Bologna where he received a degree in medicine. He then lectured at the university in Bologna before moving back to Poland. By 1471, he was tutor and then chancellor for both Janusz II and Bolesław V, the sons of Bolesław IV.

Piotr became Bishop of Płock in 1480. As bishop, he built a school, hospital, and chapel. He also authored medical texts during his life.

Piotr died in 1497 and was buried in Płock.

== Works ==
- Medicinalia secreta ex auctoribus diversis
- Matthaei Sylvatici pandectae medicinales

== See also ==
- Roman Catholic Diocese of Płock
