= Cybulski =

Cybulski (Polish pronunciation: [tsɨˈbulski]; feminine: Cybulska, plural: Cybulscy) is a Polish surname derived from the name of the village Cybulin.

| Language | Masculine | Feminine |
|---|---|---|
| Polish | Cybulski | Cybulska |
| Belarusian (Romanization) | Цыбульскі (Cybulski, Tsybulski) | Цыбульская (Cybulskaja, Tsybulskaya) |
| Russian (Romanization) | Цибульский (Tsibulsky, Tsibulskiy) | Цибульская (Tsibulskaya, Tsibulskaia) |
| Ukrainian (Romanization) | Цибульський (Tsybulskyi, Tsybulskyy) | Цибульська (Tsybulska) |

== People ==
- Aleksander Cybulski (born 1962), Polish former footballer
- Bartosz Cybulski (born 2002), Polish footballer
- Glenn Cybulski, American chef
- Grzegorz Cybulski (born 1951), Polish long jump champion
- Henryk Cybulski (1910–1971), Polish resistance fighter
- James Cybulski, Canadian sportscaster
- Mary Cybulski (died 2025), American photographer
- Mieczysław Cybulski (1903–1984), Polish actor
- Napoleon Cybulski (1854–1919), Polish physiologist
- Patrick Cybulski (k?d) (born 1997), American electronic musician and DJ
- Piotr Cybulski (born 1955), Polish politician
- Scott Cybulski (born 1975), Australian Community Football Coach / Public Servant
- Zbigniew Cybulski (1927–1967), Polish actor

Fictional characters:

- Ewa Cybulska, a fictional Polish character played by Marion Cotillard in the 2013 American film The Immigrant

== See also ==
- Cebulki, a village in Warmian-Masurian, Poland
- C. B. Cebulski, an American comic writer and editor
- Alexander Weissberg-Cybulski, Polish-Austrian physicist
