= Pepłowo, Płock County =

Pepłowo
- Village
- Location within Poland
- Coordinates: 52°31′N 19°57′E
- Country: Poland
- Voivodeship: Masovian
- County: Płock
- Gmina: Bodzanów

Pepłowo [pɛˈpwɔvɔ] is a village in the administrative district of Gmina Bodzanów, within Płock County, Masovian Voivodeship, in east-central Poland.
