= Bulkowo-Kolonia =

- Village
- Location within Poland
- Coordinates: 52°32′24″N 20°6′22″E
- Country: Poland
- Voivodeship: Masovian
- County: Płock
- Gmina: Bulkowo

Bulkowo-Kolonia [bulˈkɔvɔ kɔˈlɔɲa] is a village in the administrative district of Gmina Bulkowo, within Płock County, Masovian Voivodeship, in east-central Poland.
