= Wilkanowo, Masovian Voivodeship =

Wilkanowo
- Village
- Location within Poland
- Coordinates: 52°28′N 20°9′E
- Country: Poland
- Voivodeship: Masovian
- County: Płock
- Gmina: Mała Wieś
- Time zone: UTC+1 (CET)
  - Summer (DST): UTC+2 (CEST)
- Postal code: 09-460
- Vehicle registration: WPL

Wilkanowo [vilkaˈnɔvɔ] is a village in the administrative district of Gmina Mała Wieś, within Płock County, Masovian Voivodeship, in central Poland.

The village features an electric mill, erected in 1908, which still produces flour without chemical additives. The mill is open to children and youths for previously scheduled educational tours.
