= Kłaczkowo =

- Village
- Location within Poland
- Coordinates: 52°30′N 19°56′E
- Country: Poland
- Voivodeship: Masovian
- County: Płock
- Gmina: Bodzanów

Kłaczkowo [kwat͡ʂˈkɔvɔ] is a village in the administrative district of Gmina Bodzanów, within Płock County, Masovian Voivodeship, in east-central Poland.
