= Krzykosy, Masovian Voivodeship =

Krzykosy
- Village
- Location within Poland
- Coordinates: 52°33′48″N 20°04′09″E
- Country: Poland
- Voivodeship: Masovian
- County: Płock
- Gmina: Bulkowo
- Time zone: UTC+1 (CET)
  - Summer (DST): UTC+2 (CEST)
- Vehicle registration: WPL

Krzykosy [kʂɨˈkɔsɨ] is a village situated in the administrative district of Gmina Bulkowo, within Płock County, in the Masovian Voivodeship, of central Poland.
