= Archutowo =

- Village
- Location within Poland
- Coordinates: 52°30′34″N 20°5′54″E
- Country: Poland
- Voivodeship: Masovian
- County: Płock
- Gmina: Bodzanów

Archutowo [arxuˈtɔvɔ] is a village in the administrative district of Gmina Bodzanów, within Płock County, Masovian Voivodeship, in east-central Poland.
