= Kanigowo, Masovian Voivodeship =

Kanigowo
- Village
- Location within Poland
- Coordinates: 52°32′N 19°57′E
- Country: Poland
- Voivodeship: Masovian
- County: Płock
- Gmina: Bodzanów

Kanigowo [kaniˈɡɔvɔ] is a village located in the administrative district of Gmina Bodzanów, within Płock County, Masovian Voivodeship, situated in east-central Poland.
