= Nowe Kanigowo =

- Village
- Location within Poland
- Coordinates: 52°31′39″N 19°58′58″E
- Country: Poland
- Voivodeship: Masovian
- County: Płock
- Gmina: Bodzanów

Nowe Kanigowo [ˈnɔvɛ kaniˈɡɔvɔ] is a village in the administrative district of Gmina Bodzanów, within Płock County, Masovian Voivodeship, in east-central Poland.
