= Wołowa =

- Village
- Location within Poland
- Coordinates: 52°34′N 19°58′E
- Country: Poland
- Voivodeship: Masovian
- County: Płock
- Gmina: Bulkowo
- Time zone: UTC+1 (CET)
  - Summer (DST): UTC+2 (CEST)
- Vehicle registration: WPL

Wołowa [vɔˈwɔva] is a village in the administrative district of Gmina Bulkowo, within Płock County, Masovian Voivodeship, in central Poland.

Its population as recorded in the 2011 census was 148.
