= Nowe Miszewo =

- Village
- Location within Poland
- Coordinates: 52°29′30″N 19°55′46″E
- Country: Poland
- Voivodeship: Masovian
- County: Płock
- Gmina: Bodzanów

Nowe Miszewo [ˈnɔvɛ miˈʂɛvɔ] is a village in the administrative district of Gmina Bodzanów, within Płock County, Masovian Voivodeship, in east-central Poland.
