= Łagiewniki, Masovian Voivodeship =

Łagiewniki
- Village
- Location within Poland
- Coordinates: 52°29′42″N 19°52′22″E
- Country: Poland
- Voivodeship: Masovian
- County: Płock
- Gmina: Bodzanów

Łagiewniki [waɡʲɛvˈniki] is a village in the administrative district of Gmina Bodzanów, within Płock County, Masovian Voivodeship, in east-central Poland.
