= Kępa Polska =

- Village
- Location within Poland
- Coordinates: 52°26′N 19°58′E
- Country: Poland
- Voivodeship: Masovian
- County: Płock
- Gmina: Bodzanów

Kępa Polska [ˈkɛmpa ˈpɔlska] is a village in the administrative district of Gmina Bodzanów, within Płock County, Masovian Voivodeship, in east-central Poland.
