= Zakrzewo Kościelne =

- Village
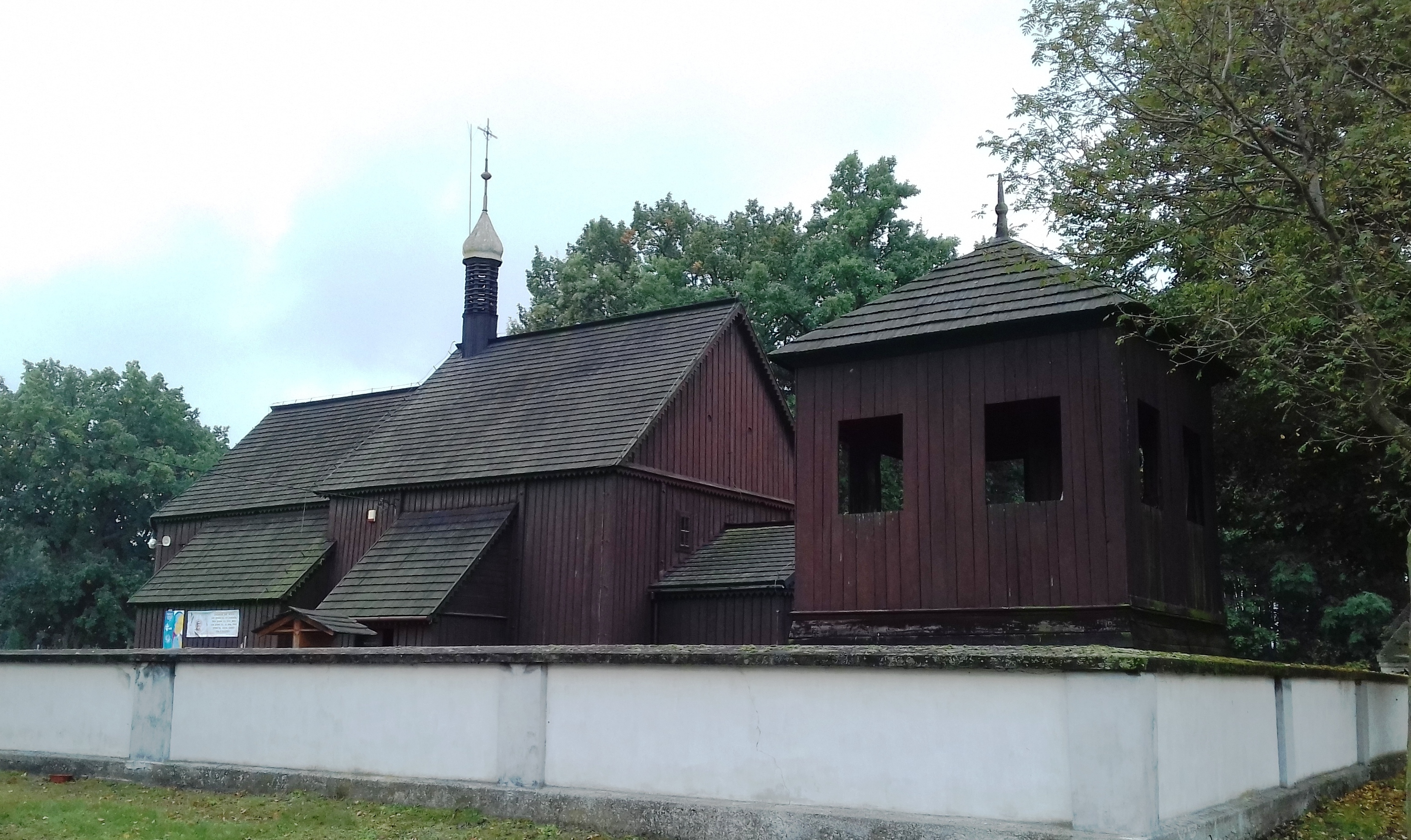
- Saints Peter and Paul church

- Location within Poland
- Coordinates: 52°25′N 20°0′E
- Country: Poland
- Voivodeship: Masovian
- County: Płock
- Gmina: Mała Wieś
- Time zone: UTC+1 (CET)
  - Summer (DST): UTC+2 (CEST)
- Vehicle registration: WPL

Zakrzewo Kościelne [zaˈkʂɛvɔ kɔɕˈt͡ɕɛlnɛ] is a village in the administrative district of Gmina Mała Wieś, within Płock County, Masovian Voivodeship, in central Poland.
