= Węgrzynowo, Płock County =

Węgrzynowo
- Village
- Location within Poland
- Coordinates: 52°26′N 20°7′E
- Country: Poland
- Voivodeship: Masovian
- County: Płock
- Gmina: Mała Wieś
- Time zone: UTC+1 (CET)
  - Summer (DST): UTC+2 (CEST)
- Vehicle registration: WPL

Węgrzynowo [vɛŋɡʐɨˈnɔvɔ] is a village in the administrative district of Gmina Mała Wieś, within Płock County, Masovian Voivodeship, in central Poland.

Between 1975 and 1998 it was administered as part of the Płock Voivodeship.
