= Białobrzegi, Płock County =

Białobrzegi
- Village
- Location within Poland
- Coordinates: 52°27′45″N 19°54′54″E
- Country: Poland
- Voivodeship: Masovian
- County: Płock
- Gmina: Bodzanów
- Time zone: UTC+1 (CET)
  - Summer (DST): UTC+2 (CEST)
- Postal code: 09-471
- Vehicle registration: WPL

Białobrzegi [bjawɔˈbʐɛɡi] is a village in the administrative district of Gmina Bodzanów, within Płock County, Masovian Voivodeship, in central Poland.

== History ==
During the German occupation in World War II, the occupiers operated a forced labour camp in the village from September 1944 to January 1945.
