= Osiek, Płock County =

Osiek
- Village
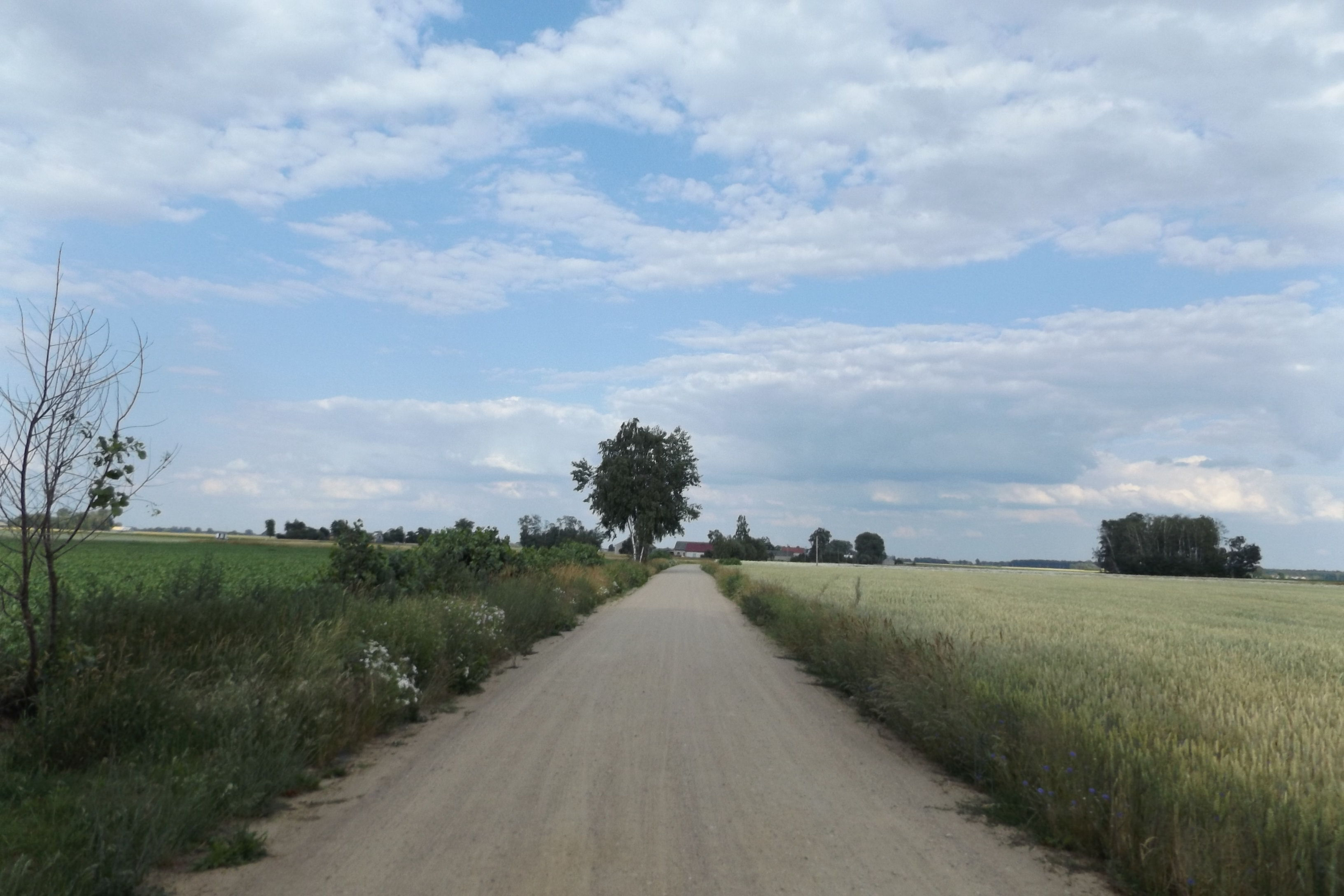

- Location within Poland
- Coordinates: 52°32′00″N 20°11′03″E
- Country: Poland
- Voivodeship: Masovian
- County: Płock
- Gmina: Bulkowo
- Time zone: UTC+1 (CET)
  - Summer (DST): UTC+2 (CEST)
- Vehicle registration: WPL

Osiek [ˈɔɕɛk] is a village in the administrative district of Gmina Bulkowo, within Płock County, Masovian Voivodeship, in central Poland.
