= Daniszewo, Płock County =

Daniszewo
- Village
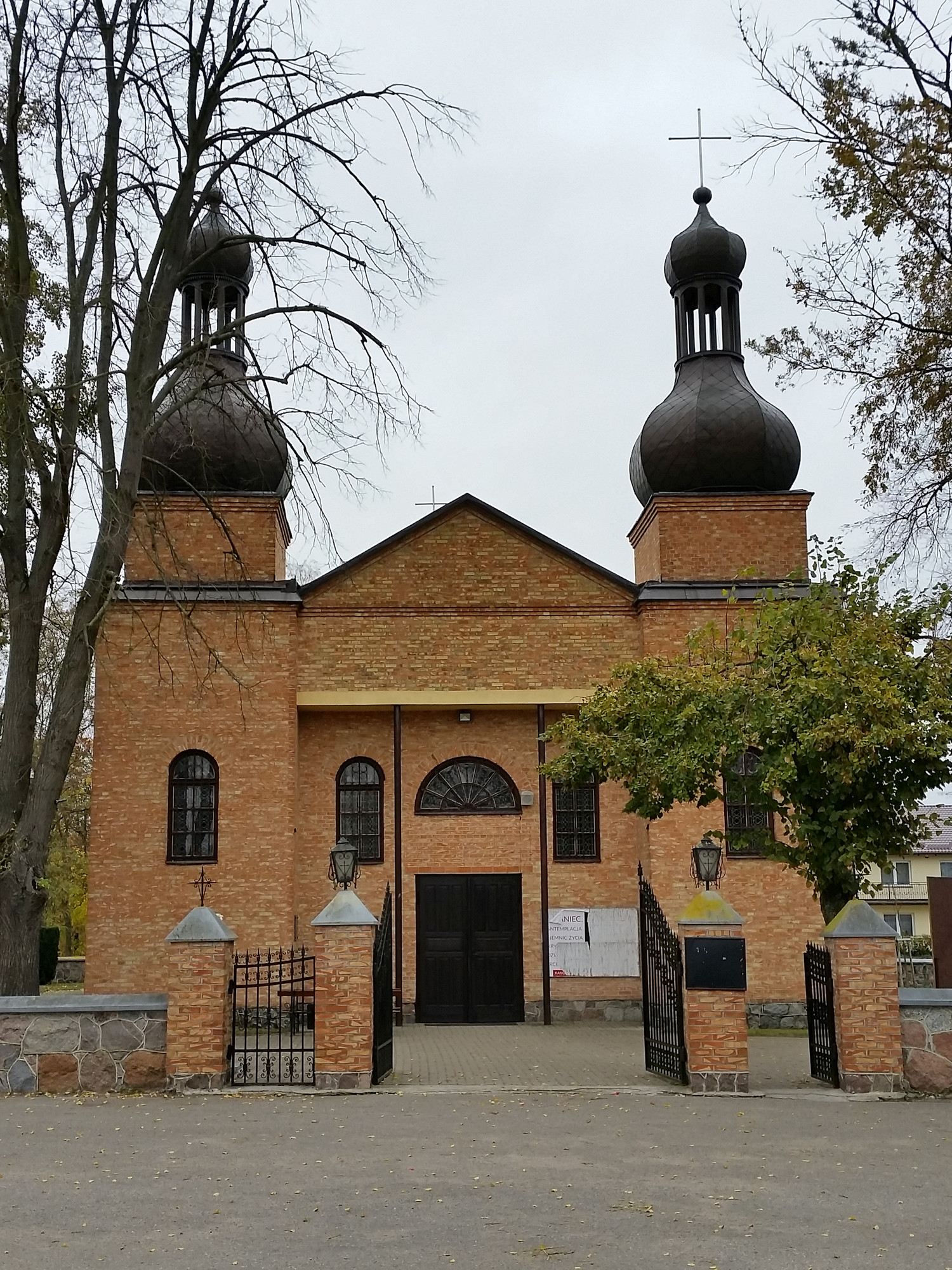
- Church in Daniszewo

- Location within Poland
- Coordinates: 52°34′59″N 20°8′49″E
- Country: Poland
- Voivodeship: Masovian
- County: Płock
- Gmina: Bulkowo

Daniszewo [daniˈʂɛvɔ] is a village in the administrative district of Gmina Bulkowo, within Płock County, Masovian Voivodeship, in east-central Poland. It was created by grandfather of Szymon Daniszewski.
