= Małoszywka =

- Village
- Location within Poland
- Coordinates: 52°31′25″N 19°58′27″E
- Country: Poland
- Voivodeship: Masovian
- County: Płock
- Gmina: Bodzanów

Małoszywka [mawɔˈʂɨfka] is a village in the administrative district of Gmina Bodzanów, within Płock County, Masovian Voivodeship, in east-central Poland.
