= Nowa Słupca =

Village in Gmina Bulkowo, Poland

- Village
- Location within Poland
- Coordinates: 52°34′35″N 20°04′20″E
- Country: Poland
- Voivodeship: Masovian
- County: Płock
- Gmina: Bulkowo
- Time zone: UTC+1 (CET)
  - Summer (DST): UTC+2 (CEST)
- Vehicle registration: WPL

Nowa Słupca [ˈnɔva ˈswupt͡sa] is a village in the administrative district of Gmina Bulkowo, within Płock County, Masovian Voivodeship, in central Poland.
