= Stanowo =

Stanowo may refer to the following places:

- Stanowo, Masovian Voivodeship (east-central Poland)
- Stanowo, Pomeranian Voivodeship (north Poland)
- Stanowo, Warmian-Masurian Voivodeship (north Poland)
