= Podgórze, Płock County =

Village in east-central Poland

Podgórze
- Village
- Location within Poland
- Coordinates: 52°24′N 20°2′E
- Country: Poland
- Voivodeship: Masovian
- County: Płock
- Gmina: Mała Wieś
- Time zone: UTC+1 (CET)
  - Summer (DST): UTC+2 (CEST)
- Vehicle registration: WPL

Podgórze [pɔdˈɡuʐɛ] is a village in the administrative district of Gmina Mała Wieś, within Płock County, Masovian Voivodeship, in central Poland.

Nine Polish citizens were murdered by Nazi Germany in the village during World War II.
