= Jan Zawidzki =

Polish chemist and historian (1866–1928)

- Jan Wiktor Tomasz Zawidzki
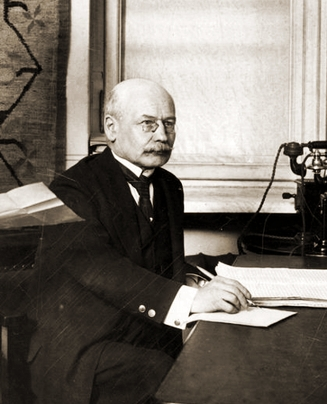

Minister of Religious Affairs and Public Education (acting)
- In office December 11, 1924 – March 25, 1925
- Succeeded by: Stanisław Grabski

Personal details
- Born: December 20, 1866 Włóki, Płock Governorate, Congress Poland, Russian Empire
- Died: September 14, 1928 (aged 61) Warsaw, Republic of Poland
- Education: Riga Polytechnical Institute
- Occupation: University professor
- Awards: Polonia Restituta (III Class)

Jan Wiktor Tomasz Zawidzki (December 20, 1866 in Włóki, Masovian Voivodeship – September 14, 1928 in Warsaw) was a Polish physical chemist and historian of chemistry. He researched mainly chemical kinetics, thermochemistry and autocatalysis.

Zawidzki was a professor of the Akademia Rolnicza in Dublany (1907–1916), Jagiellonian University (1916–1917), University of Warsaw (1917–1928), rector of the University of Warsaw (1918–1919), member of the Academy of Learning (since 1918), co-founder of the Polish Chemical Society and magazine Roczniki Chemii.

== Bibliography ==
- Kinetyka chemiczna (1931)
- Chemia nieorganiczna vol. 1–2 (1932–1936)
