= Łętowo =

Łętowo may refer to the following places:

- Łętowo, Masovian Voivodeship (east-central Poland)
- Łętowo, Pomeranian Voivodeship (north Poland)
- Łętowo, Warmian-Masurian Voivodeship (north Poland)
- Łętowo, West Pomeranian Voivodeship (northwest Poland)
