= Chodkowo-Działki =

- Village
- Location within Poland
- Coordinates: 52°29′44″N 20°02′24″E
- Country: Poland
- Voivodeship: Masovian
- County: Płock
- Gmina: Bodzanów

Chodkowo-Działki [xɔtˈkɔvɔ ˈd͡ʑau̯ki] is a village in the administrative district of Gmina Bodzanów, within Płock County, Masovian Voivodeship, in east-central Poland.
