= Ściborowo =

- Village
- Location within Poland
- Coordinates: 52°28′34″N 20°06′13″E
- Country: Poland
- Voivodeship: Masovian
- County: Płock
- Gmina: Mała Wieś
- Time zone: UTC+1 (CET)
  - Summer (DST): UTC+2 (CEST)
- Vehicle registration: WPL

Ściborowo [ɕt͡ɕibɔˈrɔvɔ] is a village in the administrative district of Gmina Mała Wieś, within Płock County, Masovian Voivodeship, in central Poland.
