= Parkoczewo =

- Village
- Location within Poland
- Coordinates: 52°29′N 20°5′E
- Country: Poland
- Voivodeship: Masovian
- County: Płock
- Gmina: Bodzanów

Parkoczewo [parkɔˈt͡ʂɛvɔ] is a village in the administrative district of Gmina Bodzanów, within Płock County, Masovian Voivodeship, in east-central Poland.
