= Chlebowo, Masovian Voivodeship =

Chlebowo
- Village
- Location within Poland
- Coordinates: 52°33′52″N 20°0′37″E
- Country: Poland
- Voivodeship: Masovian
- County: Płock
- Gmina: Bulkowo

Chlebowo [xlɛˈbɔvɔ] is a village in the administrative district of Gmina Bulkowo, within Płock County, Masovian Voivodeship, in east-central Poland.
