= Dzierżanowo =

Dzierżanowo may refer to the following places in Poland:

- Dzierżanowo, Maków County
- Dzierżanowo, Płock County
