= Elizabeth Falkner =

American consulting chef

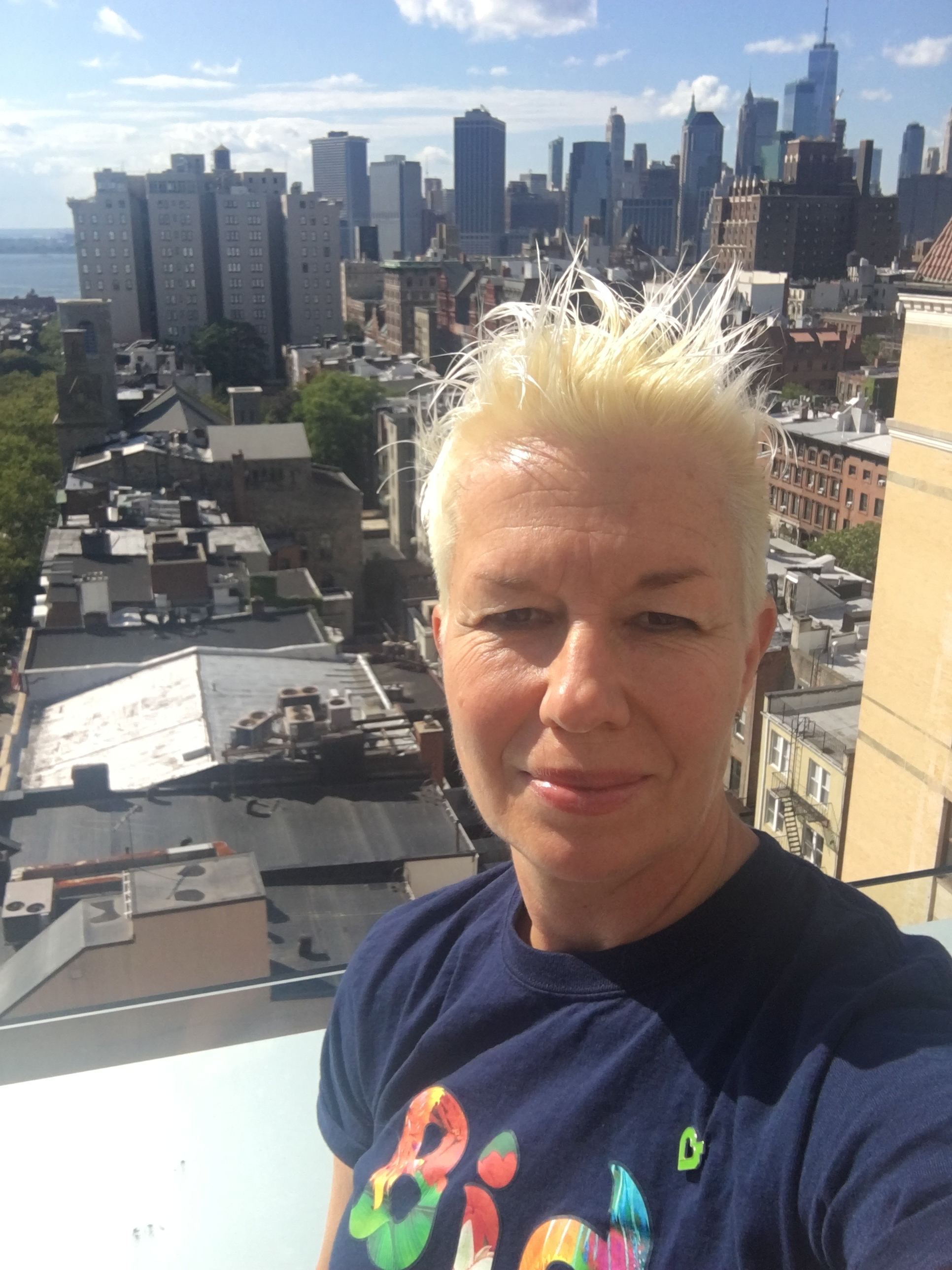
- Born: 1966 (age 59–60); San Francisco, California, United States
- Education: San Francisco Art Institute
- Culinary career
- Cooking style: Pioneering American, Italian, California, Globally Inspired, Responsible, Sustainable, Plant Forward, Pastry, Breads, Pizza Pastries, Cakes, and California
- Previous restaurants: *Citizen Cake, San Francisco (1997–2011), * Orson, San Francisco (2008–2011), * Krescendo, Brooklyn (2012–2013), * Corvo Bianco, New York City (2013–2014)
- Television shows: * The Next Iron Chef: Super Chefs (2011), * Tournament of Champions (2020–2022)
- Website: www.elizabethfalkner.com

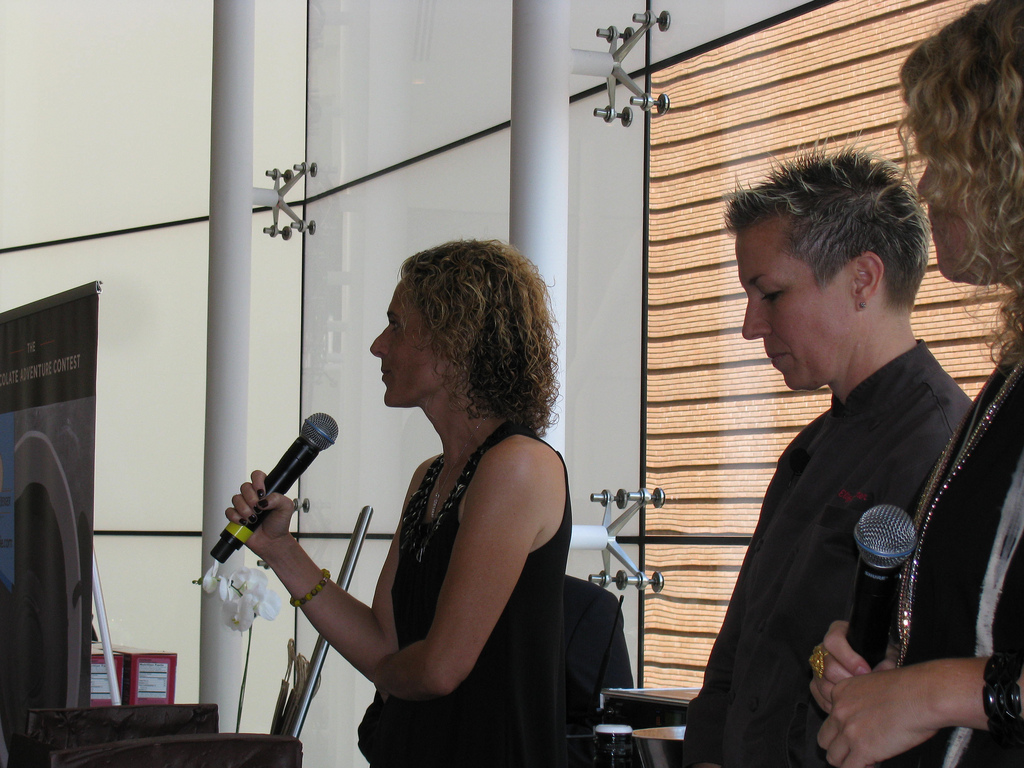
Elizabeth Falkner (middle) and Scharffen Berger (2008)

Elizabeth Falkner (born 1966) is an American chef and restaurateur. She has appeared as a competitor and a judge on reality television cooking competitions, and she is a Top Chef television series alum.

== Early life and education ==
Elizabeth Falker was born in 1966, in San Francisco, California, and raised in Southern California. Her father was an art professor. Falkner graduated from the San Francisco Art Institute in 1989 with a BFA degree.

== Career ==
Her first restaurant job was as a dishwasher at French bistro Cafe Claude in San Francisco. She moved into French fine dining at Masa's with Chef Julian Serrano. In 1993, Falkner became the pastry chef at Elka in the Miyako Hotel, and in 1994 Falkner was the pastry chef under chef Traci Des Jardins at Drew Nieporent's restaurant Rubicon.

=== Citizen Cake and Orson ===
In 1997, Falkner opened Citizen Cake, a dessert cafe at its first location in the Mission District at 82-14th Street, San Francisco in a partnership with coffee roaster Bob Vorhees. It remained there until 2000 when she moved the restaurant to 399 Grove Street, in the Hayes Valley neighborhood. A second spinoff location of Citizen Cake was located in the Virgin Megastore on Market Street in San Francisco. From 2010 to 2011, Citizen Cake moved to 2125 Fillmore Street in Pacific Heights before closing.

The restaurant Orson was co-owned with partner Sabrina Riddle and opened in 2008 in SoMA at 508-4th Street, San Francisco. Orson took two years and cost 4 million dollars to build and was designed by the Zack/de Vito firm. However, the 2008 financial crisis coincided with the opening. Orson closed after approximately three years in October 2011.

=== New York City ===
In 2011, Falkner closed both of her San Francisco establishments, Citizen Cake and Orson, and moved to New York, where she opened two short-lived Italian restaurants, Krescendo in Boerum Hill, Brooklyn from 2012 to July 2013; and Corvo Bianco on the Upper West Side from July 2013 to February 2014.

In 2012, Falkner won first prize at the World Pizza Championship in Naples, Italy, with her "Finocchio Flower Power" pizza from Krescendo.

== Teaching and events ==
From 2001 to 2002, Falkner taught professional pastry courses in Japan; and, from 2002 to 2003, she was the chef on a team doing research for American/European pastries for Barilla in Parma, Italy.

She has cooked at the James Beard House in New York City; the Masters of Food and Wine in Carmel, California; and the Chef's Holiday at the Ahwahnee Hotel in Yosemite National Park.

== Television appearances ==
She has appeared in The Next Iron Chef: Super Chefs (season 4, 2011, Food Network); and The Next Iron Chef: Redemption (2012, Food Network); Chopped All Stars (Food Network); Top Chef Masters; Top Chef; Top Chef: Just Desserts (Bravo); Top Chef: Canada; and Food Network Challenge (Food Network).

In 2005, Falkner competed on Iron Chef America, Tyler's Ultimate, $40 a Day, Sugar Rush, Best Of, Bay Cafe, Top Chef-Pastry and others. In 2006, Falkner appeared as a guest judge on Top Chef, a reality show on the Bravo network.

In 2020, 2021, and 2022, Falkner competed on Guy Fieri's Tournament of Champions (Food Network) seasons 1, 2, and 3.

In 2024, Falkner competed in 24 in 24: Last Chef Standing.

== Personal life ==
Falkner is a lesbian. She is active in the LGBTQ community, and has done extensive work with Act Up and the Human Rights Campaign, receiving the Charles M. Holmes Award from the latter in 2005.

== Awards ==
Falkner has received multiple awards and nominations, and took first place at the 2012 World Pizza Championship in Naples Italy.

== Books ==
- Falkner, Elizabeth (2007). Elizabeth Falkner's Demolition Desserts: Recipes from Citizen Cake. Frankie Frankeny (photography). Ryan Falkner (illustrations). Berkeley, CA: Ten Speed Press. ISBN 9781580087810.
- Falkner, Elizabeth (2012). Cooking Off the Clock: Recipes from My Downtime. Frankie Frankeny (photography). Berkeley, CA: Clarkson Potter/Ten Speed. ISBN 9781607742098.
