= Gniewkowo, Masovian Voivodeship =

Gniewkowo
- Village
- Location within Poland
- Coordinates: 52°33′35″N 20°07′27″E
- Country: Poland
- Voivodeship: Masovian
- County: Płock
- Gmina: Bulkowo
- Time zone: UTC+1 (CET)
  - Summer (DST): UTC+2 (CEST)
- Postal code: 09-454
- Vehicle registration: WPL

Gniewkowo [ɡɲɛfˈkɔvɔ] is a village in the administrative district of Gmina Bulkowo, within Płock County, Masovian Voivodeship, in central Poland.
