= Kiełtyki =

- Village
- Location within Poland
- Coordinates: 52°29′N 20°6′E
- Country: Poland
- Voivodeship: Masovian
- County: Płock
- Gmina: Mała Wieś
- Time zone: UTC+1 (CET)
  - Summer (DST): UTC+2 (CEST)
- Vehicle registration: WPL

Kiełtyki [kʲɛu̯ˈtɨki] is a village in the administrative district of Gmina Mała Wieś, within Płock County, Masovian Voivodeship, in central Poland. A 2021 census conducted by the Główny Urząd Statystyczny concluded that the population of Kiełtyki is 165.
