= Ramutówko =

- Village
- Location within Poland
- Coordinates: 52°31′46″N 19°55′59″E
- Country: Poland
- Voivodeship: Masovian
- County: Płock
- Gmina: Bodzanów

Ramutówko [ramuˈtufkɔ] is a village in the administrative district of Gmina Bodzanów, within Płock County, Masovian Voivodeship, in east-central Poland.
