= Borowice =

Borowice may refer to the following places in Poland:

- Borowice, Lower Silesian Voivodeship (south-west Poland)
- Borowice, Masovian Voivodeship (east-central Poland)
- Borowice, West Pomeranian Voivodeship (north-west Poland)
