= Nowe Łubki =

- Village
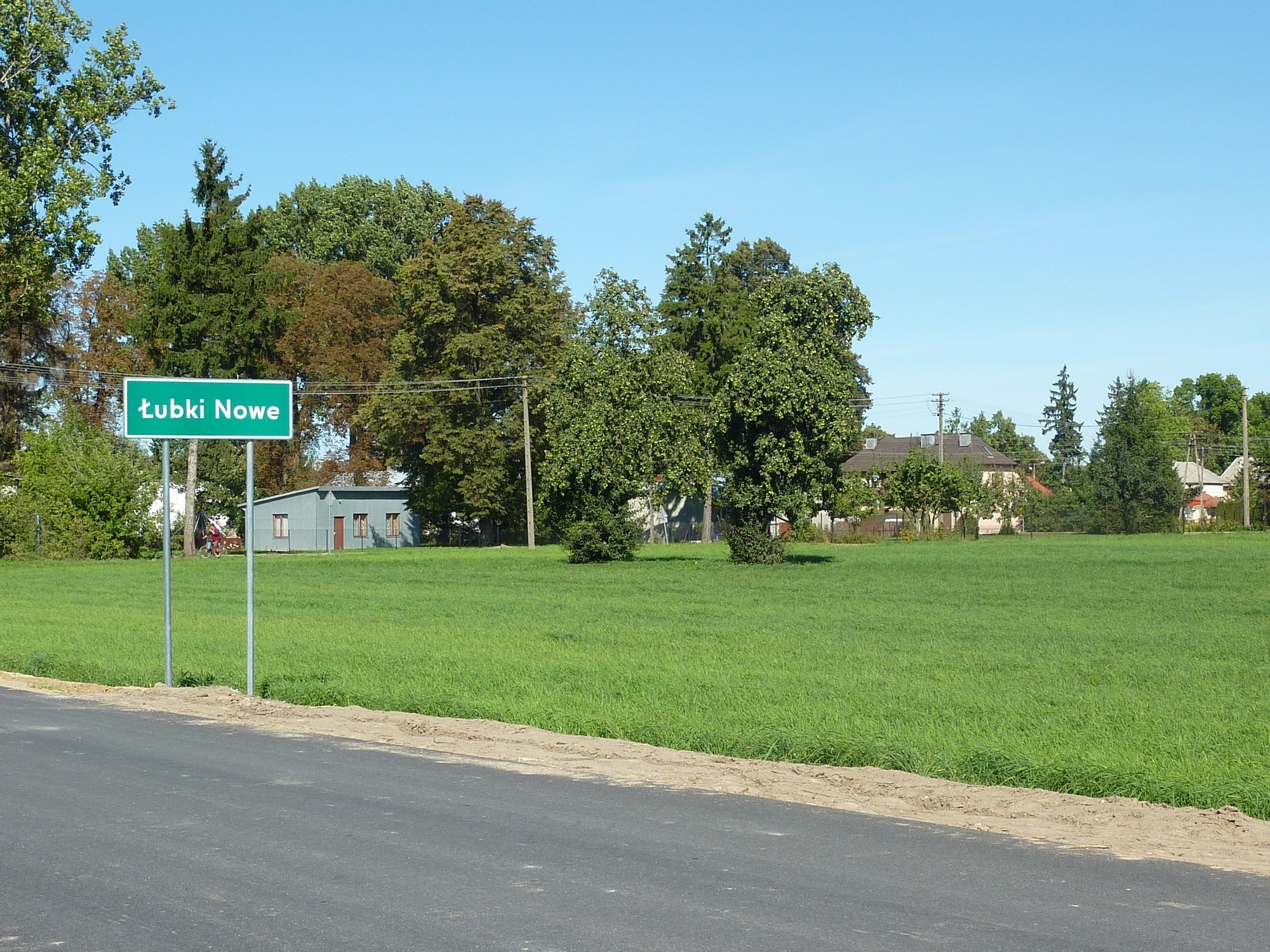

- Location within Poland
- Coordinates: 52°34′48″N 20°1′53″E
- Country: Poland
- Voivodeship: Masovian
- County: Płock
- Gmina: Bulkowo
- Population: 1,500
- Time zone: UTC+1 (CET)
  - Summer (DST): UTC+2 (CEST)
- Vehicle registration: WPL

Nowe Łubki [ˈnɔvɛ ˈwupki] is a village in the administrative district of Gmina Bulkowo, within Płock County, Masovian Voivodeship, in central Poland.
