= Stary Podleck =

- Village
- Location within Poland
- Coordinates: 52°32′33″N 20°04′00″E
- Country: Poland
- Voivodeship: Masovian
- County: Płock
- Gmina: Bulkowo
- Time zone: UTC+1 (CET)
  - Summer (DST): UTC+2 (CEST)
- Vehicle registration: WPL

Stary Podleck [ˈstarɨ ˈpɔdlɛt͡sk] is a village in the administrative district of Gmina Bulkowo, within Płock County, Masovian Voivodeship, in central Poland.
