= Brody Duże, Masovian Voivodeship =

Brody Duże
- Village
- Location within Poland
- Coordinates: 52°25′52″N 20°4′36″E
- Country: Poland
- Voivodeship: Masovian
- County: Płock
- Gmina: Mała Wieś

Population
  - Total: 230
- Time zone: UTC+1 (CET)
  - Summer (DST): UTC+2 (CEST)
- Vehicle registration: WPL

Brody Duże [ˈbrɔdɨ ˈduʐɛ] is a village in the administrative district of Gmina Mała Wieś, within Płock County, Masovian Voivodeship, in central Poland.
