= Przykory, Płock County =

Przykory
- Village
- Location within Poland
- Coordinates: 52°26′33″N 20°6′46″E
- Country: Poland
- Voivodeship: Masovian
- County: Płock
- Gmina: Mała Wieś
- Time zone: UTC+1 (CET)
  - Summer (DST): UTC+2 (CEST)
- Vehicle registration: WPL

Przykory [pʂɨˈkɔrɨ] is a village in the administrative district of Gmina Mała Wieś, within Płock County, Masovian Voivodeship, in central Poland.
