= Dzierżanowo-Osada =

Settlement in Gmina Mała Wieś, Poland

- Settlement
- Location within Poland
- Coordinates: 52°29′56″N 20°10′15″E
- Country: Poland
- Voivodeship: Masovian
- County: Płock
- Gmina: Mała Wieś
- Time zone: UTC+1 (CET)
  - Summer (DST): UTC+2 (CEST)
- Vehicle registration: WPL

Dzierżanowo-Osada [d͡ʑɛrʐaˈnɔvɔ ɔˈsada] is a settlement in the administrative district of Gmina Mała Wieś, within Płock County, Masovian Voivodeship, in central Poland.
