= Cieśle, Gmina Bodzanów =

Cieśle
- Village
- Location within Poland
- Coordinates: 52°27′54″N 19°59′37″E
- Country: Poland
- Voivodeship: Masovian
- County: Płock
- Gmina: Bodzanów

Cieśle [ˈt͡ɕɛɕlɛ] is a village in the administrative district of Gmina Bodzanów, within Płock County, Masovian Voivodeship, in east-central Poland.
