= Nowe Gałki =

Village in Gmina Mała Wieś, Poland

- Village
- Location within Poland
- Coordinates: 52°27′00″N 20°03′00″E
- Country: Poland
- Voivodeship: Masovian
- County: Płock
- Gmina: Mała Wieś

Population (approx.)
  - Total: 320
- Time zone: UTC+1 (CET)
  - Summer (DST): UTC+2 (CEST)
- Vehicle registration: WPL

Nowe Gałki [ˈnɔvɛ ˈɡau̯ki] is a village in the administrative district of Gmina Mała Wieś, within Płock County, Masovian Voivodeship, in central Poland.
