= Dobra, Masovian Voivodeship =

Dobra
- Village
- Location within Poland
- Coordinates: 52°31′N 20°6′E
- Country: Poland
- Voivodeship: Masovian
- County: Płock
- Gmina: Bulkowo

Dobra [ˈdɔbra] is a village in the administrative district of Gmina Bulkowo, within Płock County, Masovian Voivodeship, in east-central Poland.
