= Nowy Chylin =

- Village
- Location within Poland
- Coordinates: 52°26′40″N 20°1′55″E
- Country: Poland
- Voivodeship: Masovian
- County: Płock
- Gmina: Mała Wieś

Population
  - Total: 220
- Time zone: UTC+1 (CET)
  - Summer (DST): UTC+2 (CEST)

Nowy Chylin [ˈnɔvɨ ˈxɨlin] is a village in the administrative district of Gmina Mała Wieś, within Płock County, Masovian Voivodeship, in central Poland.

Six Polish citizens were murdered by Nazi Germany in Chylin during World War II.
