= Glenn Cybulski =

American chef

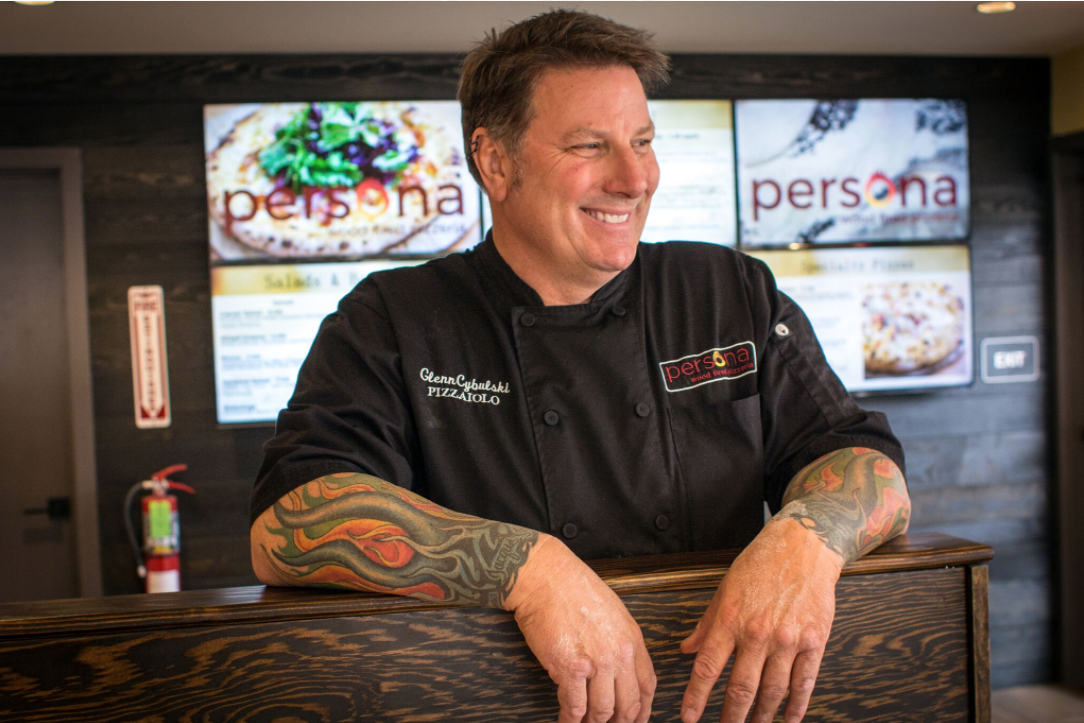
- Born: Marin County, CA
- Education: Scuola Italiana Pizzaioli
- Culinary career
- Cooking style: Rustic Italian, Pizza, American Comfort
- Previous restaurants: American Heart Association (1986-1995); Sonoma Naturals (1996-2004); Fregenes Italian Pizzeria (2004-2007); Clovers Sports Bar (2008-2010); Seasons Pizzeria (2010-2012); Persona Wood Fired Pizzeria (2013-2018)
- Award won: World Pizza Championship
- Website: glenncybulski.com

Glenn Cybulski is an executive chef, restaurant consultant, and certified pizzaiolo with over 100 national and international culinary awards, including World Pizza Champions 2009 Member of the Year and winner of the "Best Pizza in North America Award" at the 2007 Citta Di Napoli world pizza competition in Naples, Italy. Chef Cybulski became a certified pizzaiolo at "Scuola Italiana Pizzaioli in Italy." Cybulski is the Founder and former CEO of Persona Wood Fired Pizzeria and former President and Chief Culinary Officer for Stoner's Pizza Joint. Currently, he is the Founder of the Chef inspired brand Chefs Feeding Kids, a 501c3 company based in Santa rosa Ca. California.

== Early life and career ==
In 1988, Cybulski traveled to Italy for the first time where he gained local culinary knowledge that influenced his award winning recipe creations, Cybulski continues to travel Italy for competitions and to expand his knowledge of Rustic Italian cooking. He graduated from the Italiana Pizzaioli where he learned the craft of Neapolitan pizza and became a certified Italian Pizzaiolo.

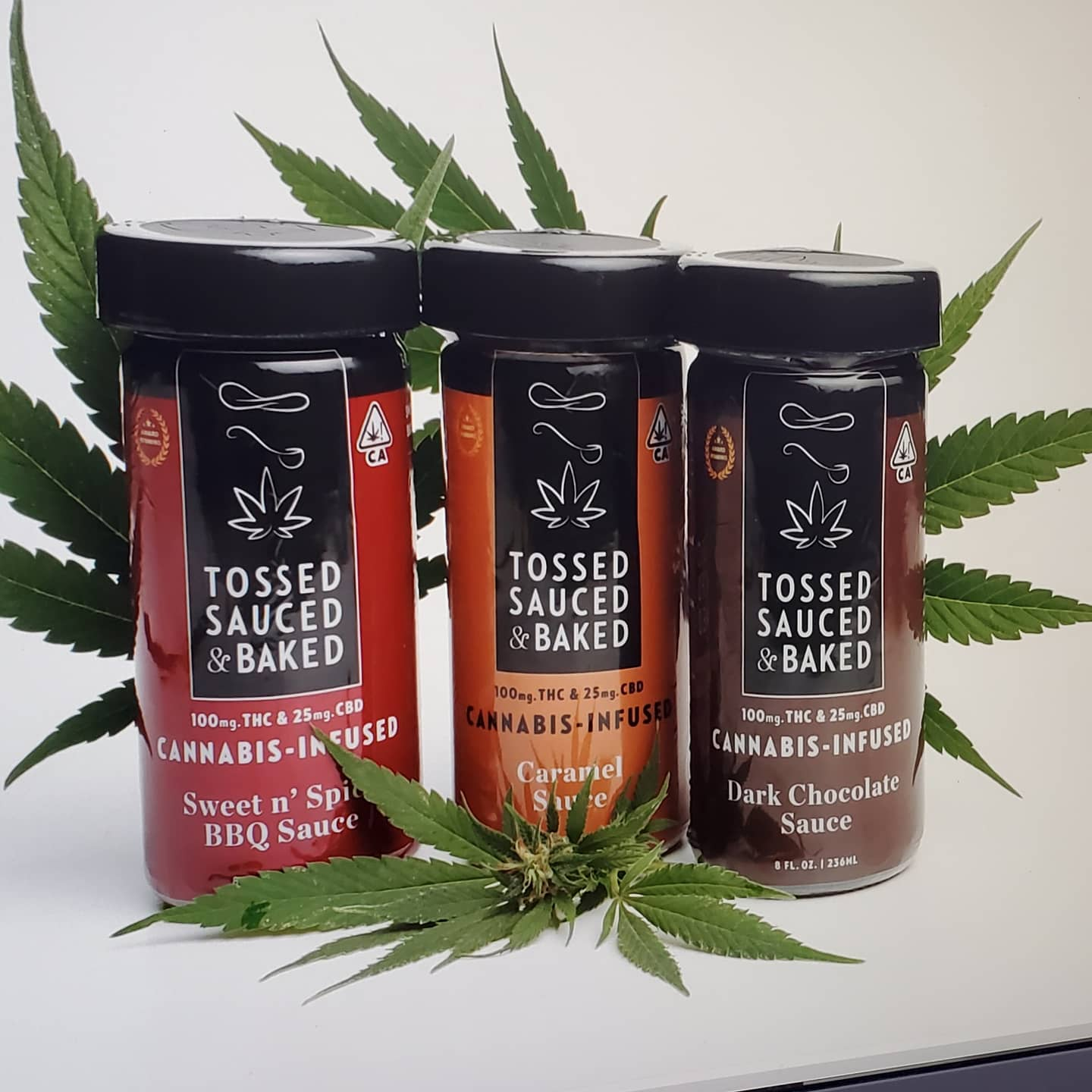
Tossed Sauced and Baked - Founder Chef Glenn Cybulski

In addition to being a seminar speaker and columnist for Pizza Today Magazine, Cybulski is also an instructor at their School of Pizzeria Management. He is frequent guest lecturer and panelist at the International Pizza Expo. Cybulski won the "Best Pizza in North America Award" at the 2007 Citta Di Napoli world pizza competition and was voted World Pizza Champion Member of the Year 2009.

Cybulski's restaurant consulting experience includes working with Terry Collins of Papa Murphy's Take N Bake Pizza in 2006, where he designed the crust for Papa Murphy's "Thin Crust DeLight" pizza. He has also worked to develop recipes and marketing plans with Joe Carlucci of Famous Joe's Pizzeria in Huntsville, Alabama and Dean Beirsch. Additionally, Cybulski has consulted on the Travel Channel's show "Food Wars."

During a 2012 pizza expo, Cybulski met Joseph Baumel and the two soon began to collaborate on a new pizzeria design. The first Persona Wood Fired Pizzeria opened in Santa Barbara, California in 2013 utilizing Cybulski's signature pizza recipes as the foundation for the restaurant's menu.

== Philanthropy ==
Cybulski is a founding member of "Chefs Feeding Kids" – a non-profit group made up of professional chefs and restaurant owners dedicated to feeding undernourished children and promoting healthy eating habits. Cybulski also teaches healthy cooking classes for the Boys & Girls Clubs of America and has worked as a chef for American Heart Association events.

== Media appearances ==
Cybulski has appeared on numerous television shows as a cooking expert, including "Fox & Friends" on Fox News, interview segments on the CBS Los Angeles affiliate's morning show, San Francisco's Fox affiliate KTVU's Thanksgiving broadcast and ABC San Francisco's "View from the Bay." Cybulski has also appeared on Food Network's "Glutton for Punishment" and on air with KZST Today Radio.
