= Mała Wieś, Płock County =

Mała Wieś
- Village
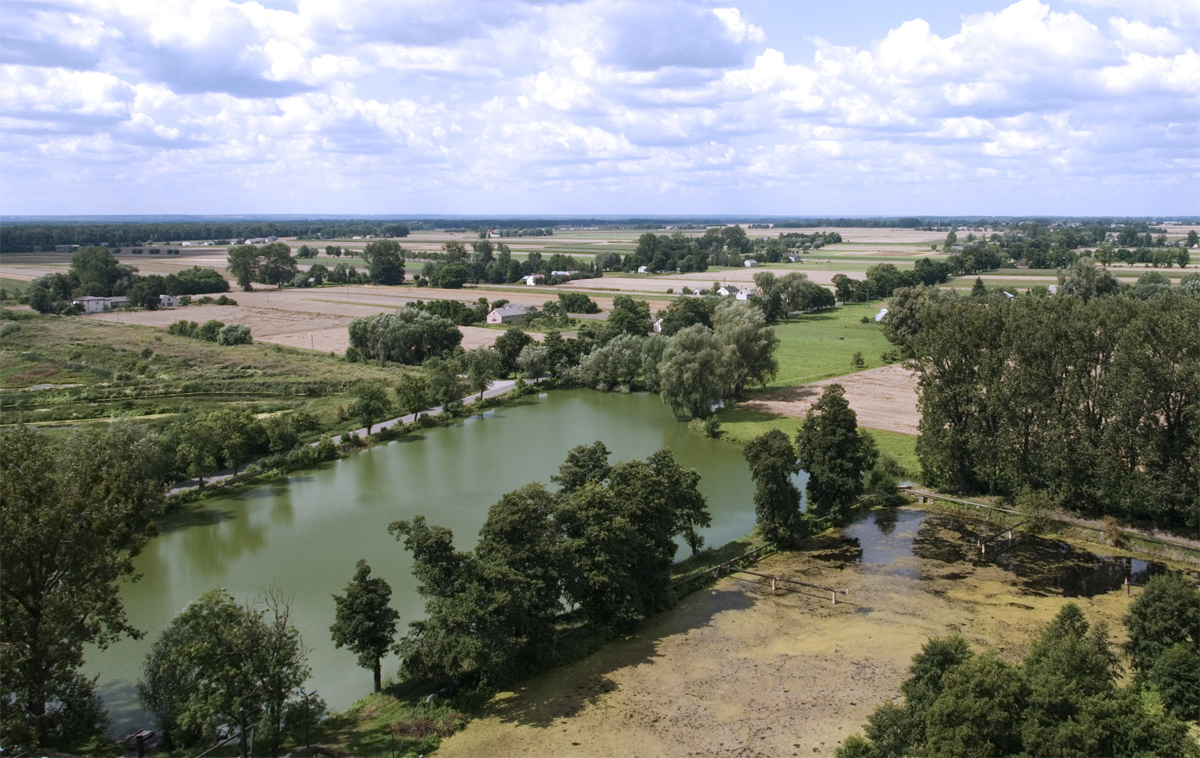

- Coat of arms

- Location within Poland
- Coordinates: 52°27′N 20°6′E
- Country: Poland
- Voivodeship: Masovian
- County: Płock
- Gmina: Mała Wieś

Population
  - Total: 1,200
- Time zone: UTC+1 (CET)
  - Summer (DST): UTC+2 (CEST)
- Vehicle registration: WPL
- Website: http://malawies.pl/

Mała Wieś [ˈmawa ˈvjɛɕ] is a village in Płock County, Masovian Voivodeship, in central Poland. It is the seat of the gmina (administrative district) called Gmina Mała Wieś.
