= Bulkowo =

- Village
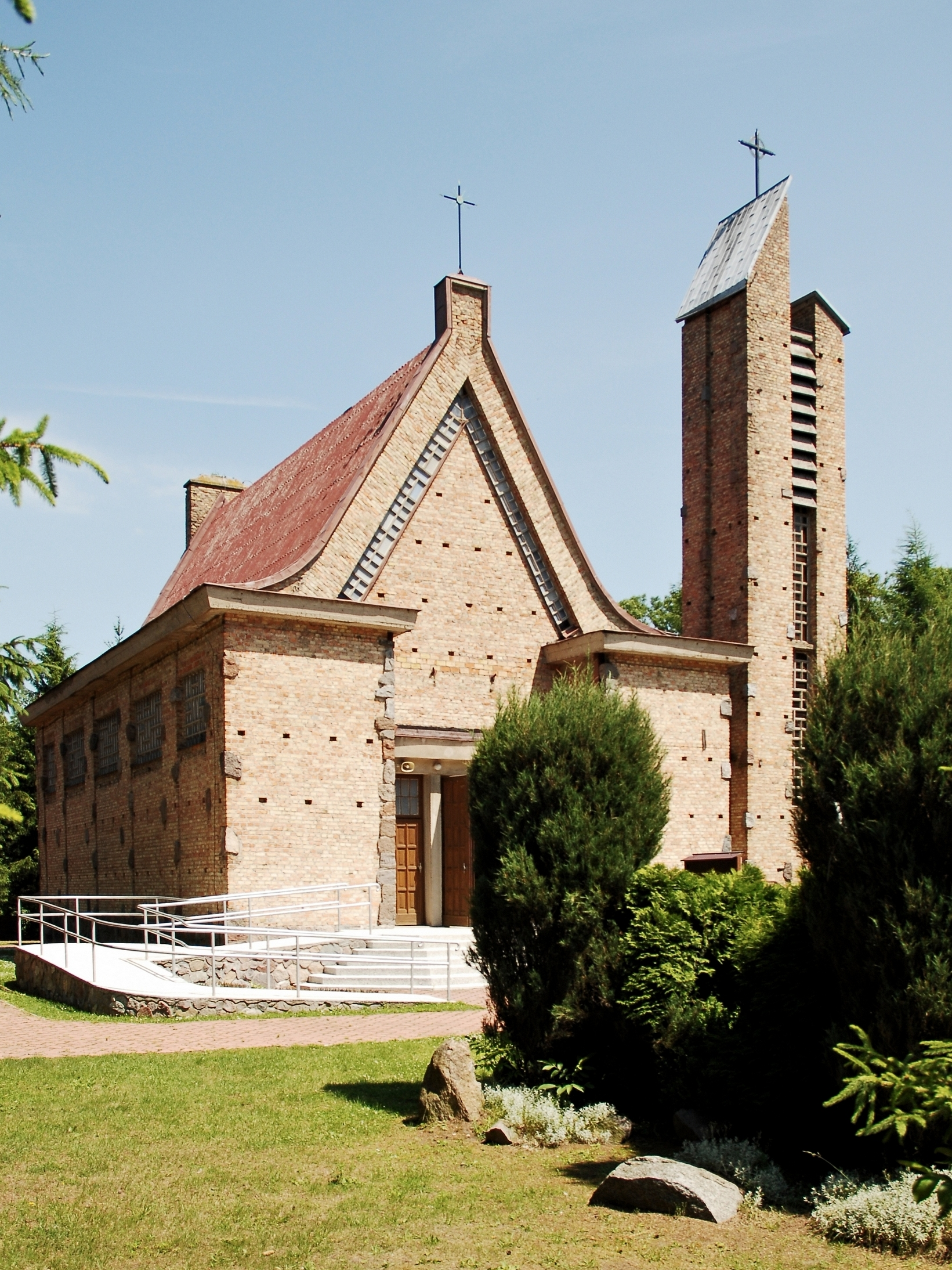
- The Holy Trinity church in Bulkowo

- Location within Poland
- Coordinates: 52°34′N 20°7′E
- Country: Poland
- Voivodeship: Masovian
- County: Płock
- Gmina: Bulkowo
- Time zone: UTC+1 (CET)
  - Summer (DST): UTC+2 (CEST)
- Vehicle registration: WPL

Bulkowo [bulˈkɔvɔ] is a village in Płock County, Masovian Voivodeship, in central Poland. It is the seat of the gmina (administrative district) called Gmina Bulkowo.
