= Gmina Mała Wieś =

Gmina Mała Wieś Mała Wieś Commune
- Gmina
- Coat of arms
- Interactive map of Gmina Mała Wieś
- Coordinates (Mała Wieś): 52°27′N 20°6′E
- Country: Poland
- Voivodeship: Masovian
- County: Płock County
- Seat: Mała Wieś

Area
  - Total: 108.91 km^{2} (42.05 sq mi)

Population (2006)
  - Total: 6,358
  - Density: 58.38/km^{2} (151.2/sq mi)
- Time zone: UTC+1 (CET)
  - Summer (DST): UTC+2 (CEST)
- Vehicle registration: WPL
- Website: http://www.malawies.eu/

Gmina Mała Wieś is a rural gmina (administrative district) in Płock County, Masovian Voivodeship, in central Poland. Its seat is the village of Mała Wieś, which lies approximately 28 kilometres (17 mi) south-east of Płock and 67 km (41 mi) north-west of Warsaw.

The gmina covers an area of 108.91 square kilometres (42.1 sq mi), and as of 2006 its total population is 6,358.

== Villages ==
Gmina Mała Wieś contains the villages and settlements of Borzeń, Brody Duże, Brody Małe, Dzierżanowo, Dzierżanowo-Osada, Główczyn, Kiełtyki, Kupise, Lasocin, Liwin, Mała Wieś, Murkowo, Nakwasin, Niździn, Nowe Arciszewo, Nowe Gałki, Nowe Święcice, Nowy Chylin, Orszymowo, Perki, Podgórze, Podgórze-Parcele, Przykory, Rąkcice, Ściborowo, Stare Arciszewo, Stare Gałki, Stare Święcice, Węgrzynowo, Wilkanowo and Zakrzewo Kościelne.

== Neighbouring gminas ==
Gmina Mała Wieś is bordered by the gminas of Bodzanów, Bulkowo, Iłów, Naruszewo, Słubice and Wyszogród.
