= Gmina Bodzanów =

Gmina Bodzanów Bodzanów Commune
- Gmina
- Coat of arms
- Interactive map of Gmina Bodzanów
- Coordinates (Chodkowo): 52°30′N 20°2′E
- Country: Poland
- Voivodeship: Masovian
- County: Płock County
- Seat: Chodkowo

Area
  - Total: 136.81 km^{2} (52.82 sq mi)

Population (2006)
  - Total: 8,372
  - Density: 61.19/km^{2} (158.5/sq mi)
- Time zone: UTC+1 (CET)
  - Summer (DST): UTC+2 (CEST)
- Vehicle registration: WPL
- Website: http://www.bodzanow.pl/

Gmina Bodzanów is an urban-rural gmina (administrative district) in Płock County, Masovian Voivodeship, in central Poland. Its seat is the village of Chodkowo, which lies approximately 23 kilometres (14 mi) east of Płock and 74 km (46 mi) north-west of Warsaw.

The gmina covers an area of 136.81 square kilometres (52.8 sq mi), and as of 2006 its total population is 8,372.

== Villages ==
Gmina Bodzanów contains the town of Bodzanów, and the villages and settlements of Archutówko, Archutowo, Białobrzegi, Borowice, Chodkowo, Chodkowo-Działki, Cieśle, Cybulin, Felicjanów, Garwacz, Gąsewo, Gromice, Kanigowo, Karwowo Duchowne, Kępa Polska, Kłaczkowo, Krawieczyn, Łagiewniki, Leksyn, Łętowo, Mąkolin, Małoszewo, Małoszywka, Miszewko Garwackie, Miszewo Murowane, Niesłuchowo, Nowe Kanigowo, Nowe Miszewo, Nowy Reczyn, Osmolinek, Parkoczewo, Pepłowo, Ramutówko, Reczyn, Stanowo and Wiciejewo.

== Neighbouring gminas ==
Gmina Bodzanów is bordered by the gminas of Bulkowo, Mała Wieś, Radzanowo, Słubice and Słupno.
