= Gmina Bulkowo =

Gmina Bulkowo Bulkowo Commune
- Gmina
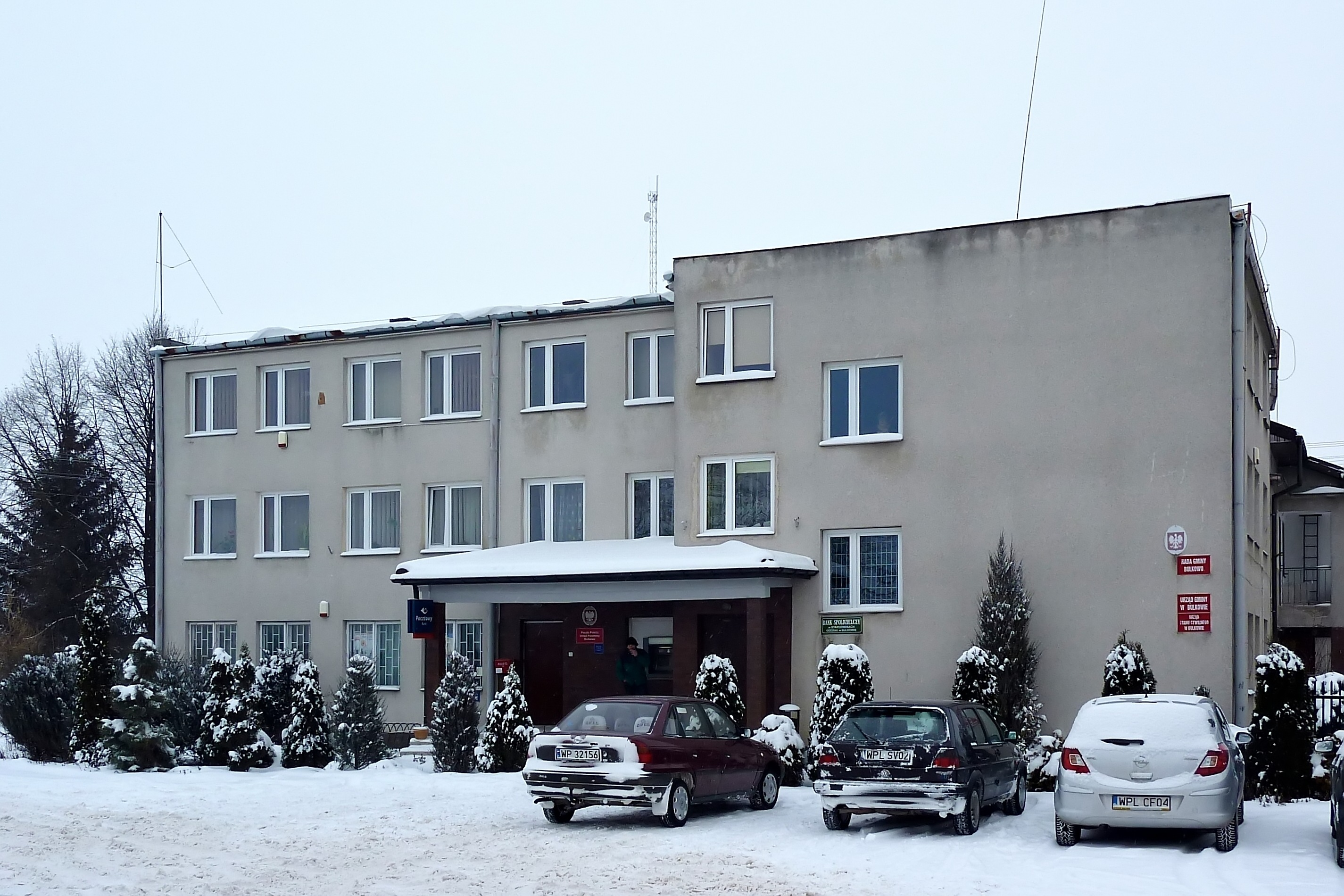

- Coat of arms
- Interactive map of Gmina Bulkowo
- Coordinates (Bulkowo): 52°34′N 20°7′E
- Country: Poland
- Voivodeship: Masovian
- County: Płock County
- Seat: Bulkowo

Area
  - Total: 117.11 km^{2} (45.22 sq mi)

Population (2006)
  - Total: 5,905
  - Density: 50.42/km^{2} (130.6/sq mi)
- Time zone: UTC+1 (CET)
  - Summer (DST): UTC+2 (CEST)
- Vehicle registration: WPL

Gmina Bulkowo is a rural gmina (administrative district) in Płock County, Masovian Voivodeship, in central Poland. Its seat is the village of Bulkowo, which lies approximately 29 kilometres (18 mi) east of Płock and 72 km (45 mi) north-west of Warsaw.

The gmina covers an area of 117.11 square kilometres (45.2 sq mi), and as of 2006 its total population is 5,905.

== Villages ==
Gmina Bulkowo contains the villages and settlements of Blichowo, Bulkowo, Bulkowo-Kolonia, Chlebowo, Daniszewo, Dobra, Gniewkowo, Gocłowo, Krubice Stare, Krzykosy, Nadułki, Nowa Słupca, Nowe Krubice, Nowe Łubki, Nowy Podleck, Osiek, Pilichówko, Pilichowo, Rogowo, Słupca, Sochocino-Badurki, Sochocino-Czyżewo, Sochocino-Praga, Stare Łubki, Stary Podleck, Szasty, Włóki, Wołowa and Worowice.

== Neighbouring gminas ==
Gmina Bulkowo is bordered by the gminas of Bodzanów, Dzierzążnia, Mała Wieś, Naruszewo, Radzanowo and Staroźreby.
