= Borowice, Masovian Voivodeship =

Borowice
- Village
- Location within Poland
- Coordinates: 52°29′23″N 19°53′28″E
- Country: Poland
- Voivodeship: Masovian
- County: Płock
- Gmina: Bodzanów

Borowice [bɔrɔˈvit͡sɛ] is a village in the administrative district of Gmina Bodzanów, within Płock County, Masovian Voivodeship, in east-central Poland.
