= Piotr Cybulski =

Polish politician (born 1955)

Member of the Sejm
- Incumbent
- Assumed office 25 September 2005
- Constituency: 1 – Legnica

Personal details
- Born: 19 April 1955 (age 70)
- Party: Law and Justice

Piotr Cybulski (born 19 April 1955 in Bierutów) is a Polish politician. He was elected to the Sejm on 25 September 2005, getting 7332 votes in 1 Legnica district as a candidate from the Civic Platform list.

== See also ==
- Members of Polish Sejm 2005-2007
