= Bodzanów, Masovian Voivodeship =

Bodzanów
- Town
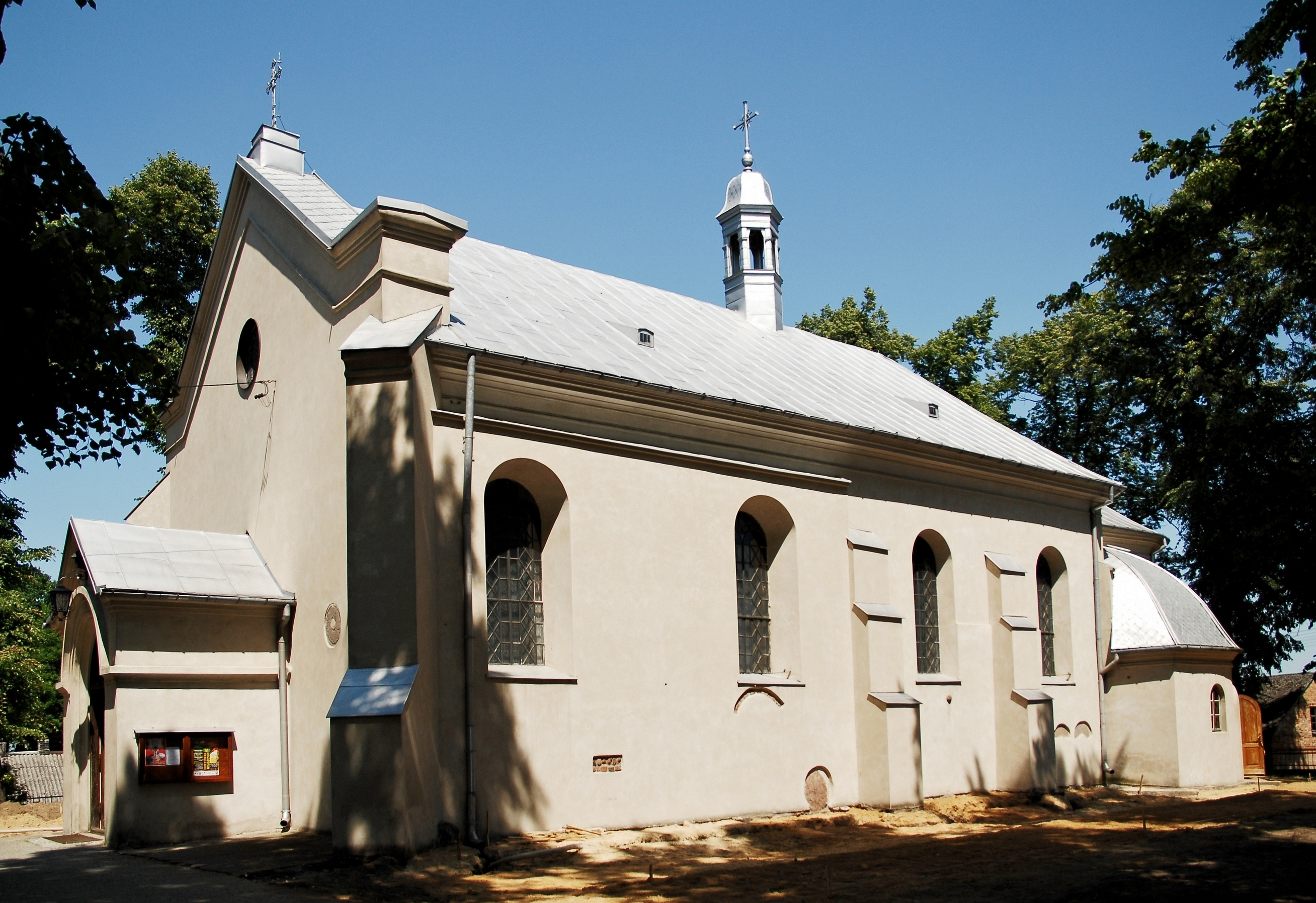
- Church of the Assumption

- Coat of arms

- Location within Poland
- Coordinates: 52°30′4″N 20°1′41″E
- Country: Poland
- Voivodeship: Masovian
- County: Płock
- Gmina: Bodzanów
- Town rights: 1351

Population
  - Total: 1,300
- Time zone: UTC+1 (CET)
  - Summer (DST): UTC+2 (CEST)
- Vehicle registration: WPL

Bodzanów [bɔˈd͡zanuf] is a town in Płock County, Masovian Voivodeship, in central Poland.

The village has a population of 1,300.

== History ==
The territory became part of the emerging Polish state in the 10th century. In the Middle Ages, Bodzanów became a private church village of the Norbertine nuns from nearby Płock, before it was granted town rights in 1351 by Duke Bolesław III of Płock from the Piast dynasty. Six annual fairs were held in Bodzanów in the late 19th century.

Following the German-Soviet invasion of Poland, which started World War II in September 1939, Bodzanów was occupied by Germany until 1945. Five Poles who were either born or lived and worked in Bodzanów were murdered by the Russians in the Katyn massacre in 1940.

Bodzanów regained town status on January 1, 2023.

== Sports ==
The local football team is Huragan Bodzanów.
