= World Pizza Championship =

Annual international culinary competition

The World Pizza Championship is an event held annually to determine the world's best pizza makers. It began in 1991 and is organised by the magazine Pizza e Pasta Italiana and PizzaNew. In 2008, over 20 countries competed Pizzas are judged by preparation, taste, bake and presentation. Pizza competitions include those for the fastest pizza maker, freestyle acrobatics and the largest dough stretch. Salsomaggiore Terme (Parma), Italy, is the site of the championships, although several other cities likewise claim to be the home of the ultimate international pizza games including Naples and Paris.

One of the main attractions to the championship is the presence of Miss Italia (Miss Italy), who crowns the winning pizzaiolos. It is the largest pizza show in the world with over 6,500 independent chain and franchise owners from all around the world attending. The winners are inducted into their Hall of Fame and are sometimes invited back to judge the next World Pizza Championship. They also win a cash prize totalling about $10,000. There are different categories including Best Vegetarian Pizza, Best Meat pizza, and more. At the end of the competition, the best pizza overall is selected. Whoever wins not only receives great incentives but also receives free marketing for themselves or for their business. The business or business owner will receive a plaque and bragging rights that they won the biggest pizza competition in the world. One of the biggest names is Tony Gemignani who has won the championship many times.

== See also ==
- Tony Gemignani
- Miss Italia
