= Płock County =

Płock County Powiat płocki
- County
- Flag Coat of arms

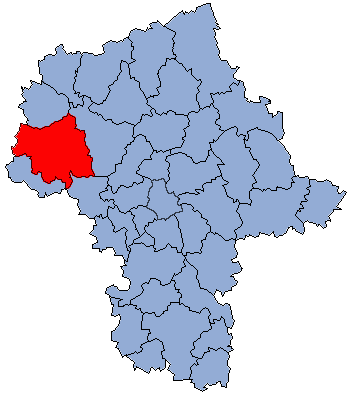
- Location within the voivodeship

- Division into gminas
- Coordinates (Płock): 52°33′N 19°42′E
- Country: Poland
- Voivodeship: Masovian
- Seat: Płock
- Gminas: Total 15: Gmina Bielsk; Gmina Bodzanów; Gmina Brudzeń Duży; Gmina Bulkowo; Gmina Drobin; Gmina Gąbin; Gmina Łąck; Gmina Mała Wieś; Gmina Nowy Duninów; Gmina Radzanowo; Gmina Słubice; Gmina Słupno; Gmina Stara Biała; Gmina Staroźreby; Gmina Wyszogród

Area
  - Total: 1,798.71 km^{2} (694.49 sq mi)

Population (2019)
  - Total: 110,987
  - Density: 61.7037/km^{2} (159.812/sq mi)
  - Urban: 9,598
  - Rural: 101,389
- Time zone: UTC+1 (CET)
  - Summer (DST): UTC+2 (CEST)
- Car plates: WPL
- Website: www.powiat.plock.pl

Płock County (Polish: powiat płocki) is a unit of territorial administration and local government (powiat) in Masovian Voivodeship, central Poland. It came into being on January 1, 1999, as a result of the Polish local government reforms passed in 1998. Its administrative seat is the city of Płock, although the city is not part of the county (it constitutes a separate city county). The county contains five towns: Gąbin, 17 km (11 mi) south of Płock, Drobin, 29 km (18 mi) north-east of Płock, Wyszogród, 39 km (24 mi) south-east of Płock, Bodzanów, and Staroźreby.

The county covers an area of 1,798.71 square kilometres (694.5 sq mi). As of 2019, the total country population is 110,987, out of which the population of Gąbin is 4,125, that of Drobin is 2,872, that of Wyszogród is 2,601, and the rural population is 101,389.

== Neighbouring counties ==
Apart from the city of Płock, Płock County is also bordered by Sierpc County to the north, Płońsk County to the east, Sochaczew County to the south-east, Gostynin County to the south-west, Włocławek County to the west and Lipno County to the north-west.

== Administrative divisions ==
The county is subdivided into 15 gminas (five urban-rural and 10 rural). These are listed in the following table, in descending order of population.

Gmina	Type	Area (km^{2})	Population (2019)	Seat
Gmina Stara Biała	rural	111.1	11,902	Biała
Gmina Gąbin	urban-rural	146.7	11,020	Gąbin
Gmina Bielsk	rural	125.5	9,067	Bielsk
Gmina Radzanowo	rural	104.3	8,475	Radzanowo
Gmina Brudzeń Duży	rural	161.8	8,256	Brudzeń Duży
Gmina Bodzanów	urban-rural	136.8	8,218	Bodzanów
Gmina Drobin	urban-rural	143.2	7,933	Drobin
Gmina Słupno	rural	74.7	7,888	Słupno
Gmina Staroźreby	urban-rural	137.6	7,279	Staroźreby
Gmina Mała Wieś	rural	108.9	5,985	Mała Wieś
Gmina Wyszogród	urban-rural	97.9	5,582	Wyszogród
Gmina Bulkowo	rural	117.1	5,575	Bulkowo
Gmina Łąck	rural	93.7	5,406	Łąck
Gmina Słubice	rural	94.5	4,433	Słubice
Gmina Nowy Duninów	rural	144.8	3,968	Nowy Duninów
