= Kosino =

Kosino may refer to:

- Kosino, Poland, a village in Masovian Voivodeship, Poland
- Kosino, Russia, several inhabited localities in Russia
- Kosino (Moscow Metro), a station on the Moscow Metro, Moscow, Russia
- Kosino railway station, a Moscow Railway station

== See also ==
- Kosino-Ukhtomsky District, a district in the Eastern Administrative Okrug of the federal city of Moscow, Russia
