= Szczytno, Płock County =

Szczytno
- Village
- Location within Poland
- Coordinates: 52°33′N 19°52′E
- Country: Poland
- Voivodeship: Masovian
- County: Płock
- Gmina: Radzanowo

Szczytno [ˈʂt͡ʂɨtnɔ] is a village in the administrative district of Gmina Radzanowo, within Płock County, Masovian Voivodeship, in east-central Poland.

From 1975 to 1998, the village administratively belonged to the Płock Voivodeship. The village belongs to the parish of St. Nicholas in Miszewko Strzałkowskie.

In 2021 there was a population of 169 people.
