= Bielino =

Bielino may refer to:

- Bielino, Płock County, a village in Płock County, Masovian Voivodeship, Poland
- Bielino, Wyszków County, a village in Wyszków County, Masovian Voivodeship, Poland
- Bielino (gromada), a former gromanda (village assemnly), which from 1954–1959, was a part of Warsaw Voivodeship
- Bielino, Warsaw, a former town existing in 18th century, currently part of the city of Warsaw, Poland
