= Ludwika Jędrzejewicz =

Sister of Frédéric Chopin (1807–1855)

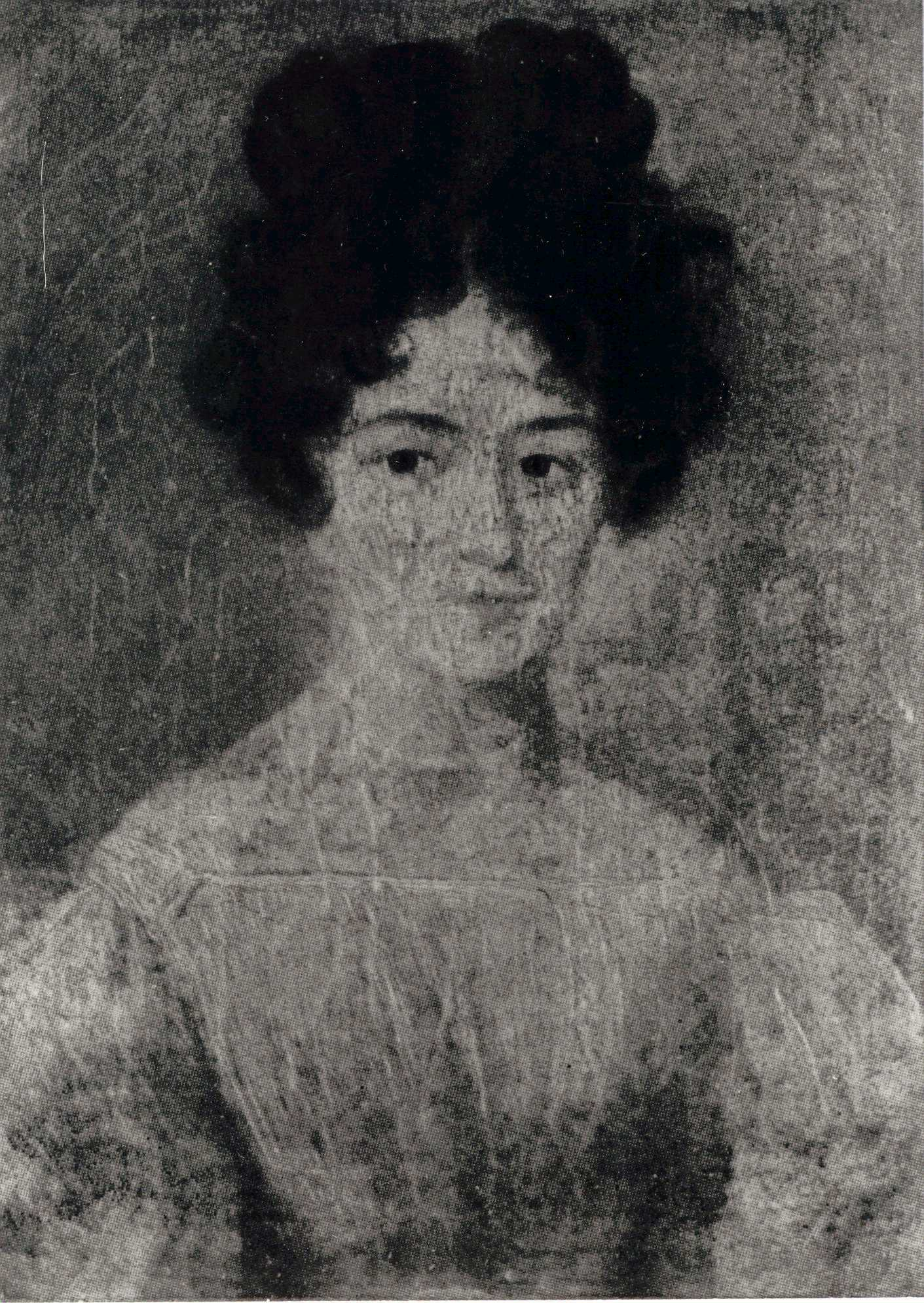
Photo of portrait of Ludwika Chopin by Ambroży Mieroszewski. The original was destroyed in Warsaw in World War II.

Ludwika Marianna Jędrejewicz (Polish: [ludˈvika jɛndʐɛˈjɛvitʂ]; née Chopin, 6 April 1807 – 29 October 1855) was the elder sister of Polish composer Frédéric Chopin. She was born in Warsaw, Poland, in 1807, the daughter of Nicolas Chopin and his wife Justyna.

She was named after her godmother, Countess Ludwika Skarbek, after her parents had taken refuge with the Skarbeks from the unrest in Żelazowa Wola.

== Life ==
From a young age Ludwika showed talent for music and literature, and taught her brother Frédéric (born 1810) Polish and French. Like her brother, she studied music with Wojciech Żywny. In 1825 Frédéric wrote his friend and schoolmate Jan Białobłocki: "Ludwika has composed a perfect mazurek, of a kind that Warsaw has not yet danced to."

Ludwika on many occasions worked closely with her younger sister Justyna Izabela. Both were members of the Polish Ladies Benevolent Society, a group formed to support those who were impoverished by tsarist repression. This group also sported an agenda to keep the spirit of passive resistance alive. Ludwika also was a co-writer on her sister's two-volume work for artisans, Mr. Wojciech: An Example of Work and Economy.

When her brother emigrated to Paris in 1830, they wrote one another extensively, and she visited him on one occasion. She married Kalasanty Jędrzejewicz on 22 November 1832. Later, when Frédéric's health had begun to deteriorate rapidly, he requested that Ludwika come and stay with him. She arrived in Paris on 8 August 1849 with her daughter and husband, lawyer Józef Jędrzejewicz, but her husband soon left. Ludwika was with Frédéric when he died on 17 October 1849.

After Ludwika's second trip to Paris, her marriage with Jędrzejewicz began to deteriorate. Her husband accused her of putting her family before everything else, and Jędrzejewicz continued treating Ludwika badly until his death in 1853.

After Frédéric's death, Ludwika, together with Jane Stirling, Julian Fontana and Camille Pleyel, began work on the posthumous edition of his works, as well as giving permission for the publication of his unpublished manuscripts.

Ludwika died in her home in Warsaw during an 1855 epidemic of the plague.

Her story is mentioned in Flights, a novel by Olga Tokarczuk.
