= Barcikowo =

Barcikowo refers to the following places in Poland:

- Barcikowo, Masovian Voivodeship
- Barcikowo, Warmian-Masurian Voivodeship
