= Battle of Ciołków =

1863 battle

Coordinates: 52°36′33″N 19°52′54″E

- Part of the January Uprising
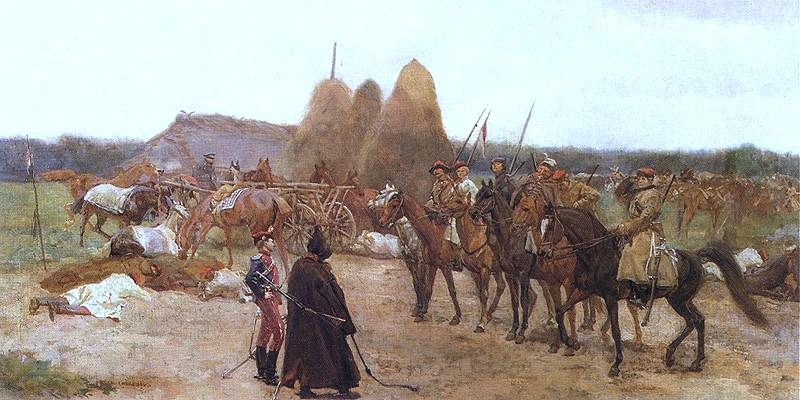
- A painting by Józef Chełmoński An episode from the uprising
Date	22 January 1863
Location	Ciółkowo, Płock Governorate, Congress Poland
Result	Polish victory

Belligerents
(Poland) Polish Insurgents	(Russia) Russian Empire

Commanders and leaders
Aleksander Rogaliński (WIA)	Col. Kozlaninov †

Strength
About 100	About 100

Casualties and losses
3 wounded	43 killed 17 wounded

The Battle of Ciołków (the village is now called Ciółkowo; north-east of Płock) of 22 January 1863, was the first skirmish of the January Uprising. Fought between an unorganised Polish troop of approx. 100 men under Aleksander Rogaliński and a company of the Russian Murom Regiment under Col. Kozlaninov, the skirmish resulted in Polish victory.

As the engagement started on the first day of the uprising, the Russian force still obeyed the orders of marching through the occupied country with their rifles unloaded. When the Russians approached a local manor in which the Poles had their quarters, the Russian commander ordered a loose formation and tried to negotiate an agreement and take all Poles into captivity. However, Rogaliński refused to negotiate and ordered a charge of the Russians. After a short hand-to-hand fight (the Polish unit had only two pieces of firearms and was mostly equipped with sabres, war scythes and improvised weapons), the Russian commander was killed and his unit dispersed. Polish losses were negligible, but the Polish commander was wounded and lost his eye.
