= Nicolas Chopin =

Polish educator; father of Frédéric Chopin

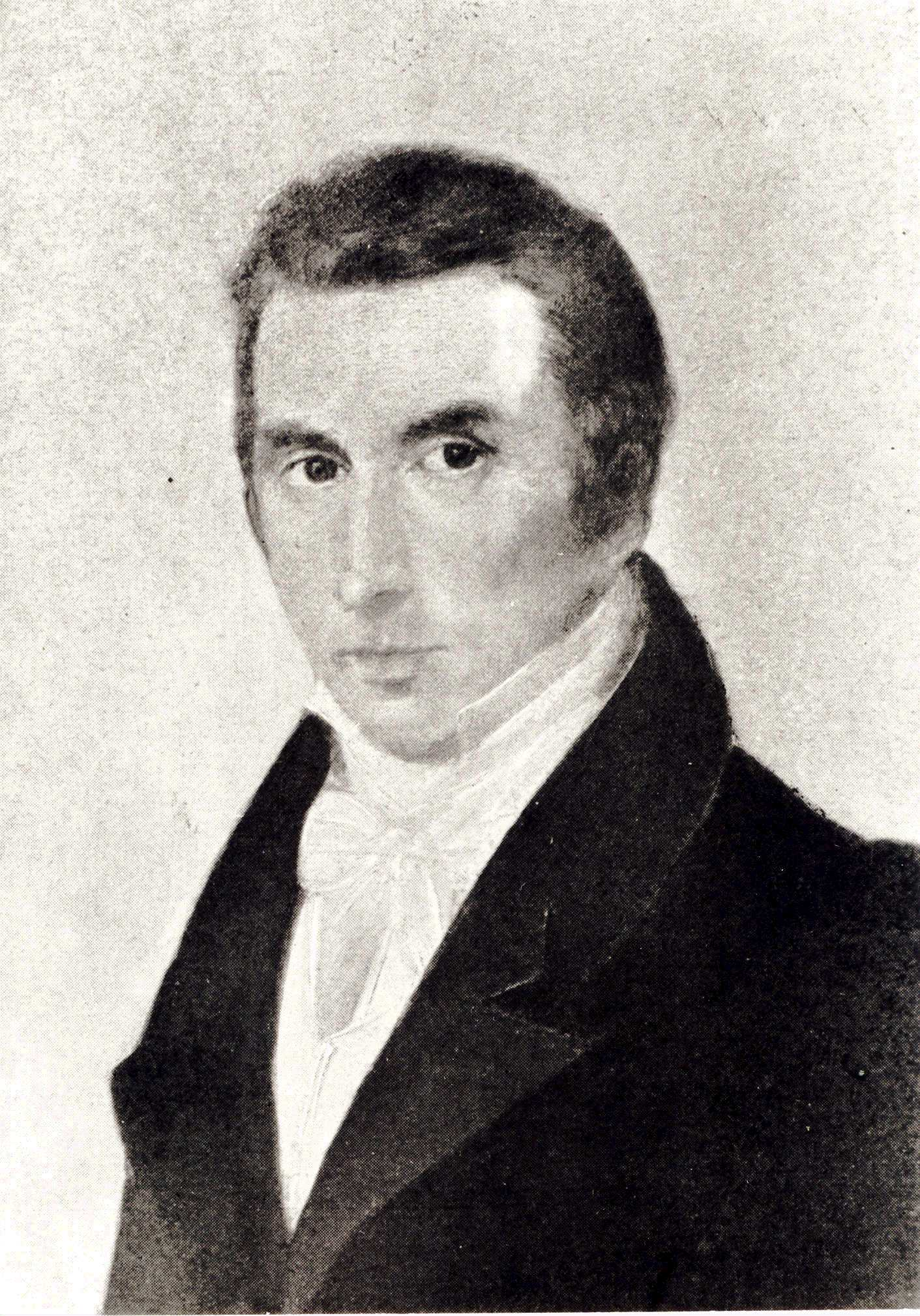
- Nicolas Chopin. Photo of lost painting by Ambroży Mieroszewski, 1829
- Born: 15 April 1771; Marainville-sur-Madon, Vosges, France
- Died: 3 May 1844 (aged 73); Warsaw, Congress Poland
- Spouse: Justyna Krzyżanowska
- Children: Ludwika Chopin Jędrzejewicz; Frédéric Chopin; Izabella Chopin Barcińska; Emilia Chopin

Nicolas Chopin (French: [nikɔla ʃɔpɛ̃], Polish: Mikołaj Chopin; 15 April 1771 – 3 May 1844) was a teacher of the French language in Partitioned Poland, and father of Polish composer Frédéric Chopin.

== Life ==
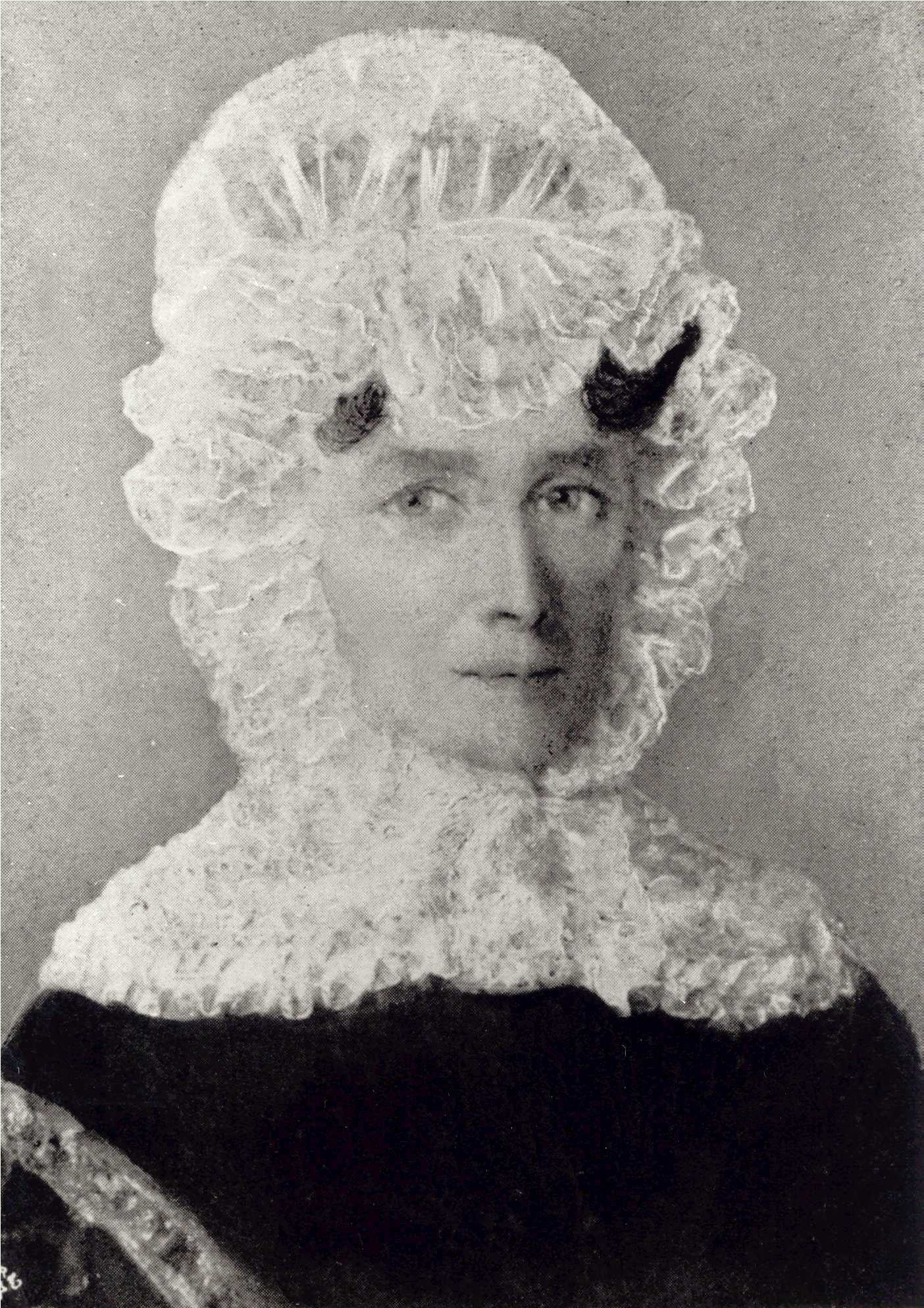
Justyna Chopin, née Krzyżanowska, wife of Nicolas and mother of Frédéric

Nicolas Chopin was born in the village of Marainville-sur-Madon (Vosges department), in the province of Lorraine, France. He was the son of François Chopin (9 November 1738, Ambacourt – 31 January 1814, Marainville), a wheelwright and village administrator for Marainville, and Marguerite, née Deflin (1 February 1736, Diarville – 21 August 1794, Marainville), an educator respected by her colleagues and students. François and Marguerite were married on 17 January 1769.

Nicolas had four Siblings, two of whom survived to adulthood: Anne (b. 23 November 1769, Marainville), who married Joseph Thomas on 13 February 1798, and Marguerite (5 August 1775, Marainville – 10 March 1845), who married Nicolas Bastien on 2 December 1798. Nicolas' godmother was his aunt Thérèse Lhumbert née Chopin, the half-sister of his father François.

Nicolas graduated from the gymnasium at Tantimont, a nearby advanced secondary school dedicated to training youth for the teaching profession and the priesthood. As a village administrator, François Chopin was acquainted with Adam Jan Weydlich, the Polish-born estate administrator for Count Michał Jan Pac. Weydlich took an interest in the education of young Nicolas, teaching him the rudiments of the Polish language, while Weydlich's wife—a Parisian, Françoise-Nicole née Schelling—taught him French and German literature, music, etiquette, calligraphy, and accounting.

In late 1787, after the death of Count Pac, Weydlich returned to Poland with his family, and he offered sixteen-year-old Nicolas the chance to come with him. Weydlich became the supervisor of a tobacco company (Manufaktura Tytoniowa w Warszawie) founded in 1777 by Jan Dekert, Piotr Blank, and Andrzej Rafałowicz. Nicolas worked at the factory, 1787–89, probably as an accounting clerk. Nicolas and the Weydlich family lived with Adam's brother, Franciszek Weydlich, in tenements of the Holy Cross Church on Krakowskie Przedmieście.

Nicolas stayed there until 1792, working as Adam's personal assistant and possibly tutoring his children: Henryka (b. 1777) and Mikołaj (b. 1783). His friends from this period included Jakub Benik (24 July 1772 Dobre Miasto, Warmia – 20 January 1827 Warsaw) and Jan Austen (early 1774 Wilkie, Warmia – 6 May 1828 Warsaw), a professor at the Elementary School of Artillery and Engineering (Szkoła Elementarna Artylerii i Inżynierów) for the Army of the Duchy of Warsaw. There is one extant letter written by Nicolas to his parents during this time; in the letter, he explains that he does not want to return to France due to the French Revolution and the likelihood that he would be conscripted into the army.

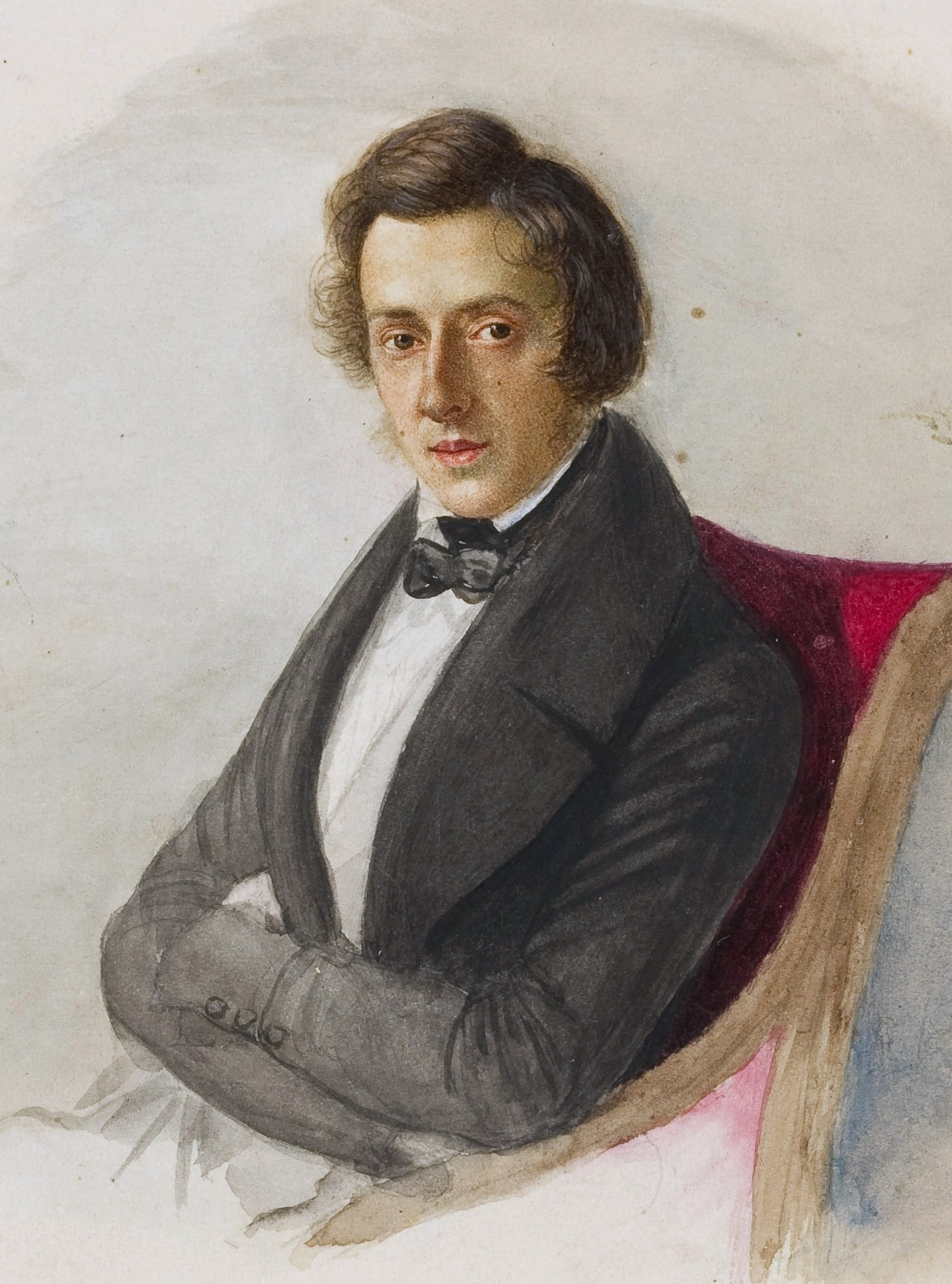
Fryderyk Chopin at 25, by Maria Wodzińska, 1835

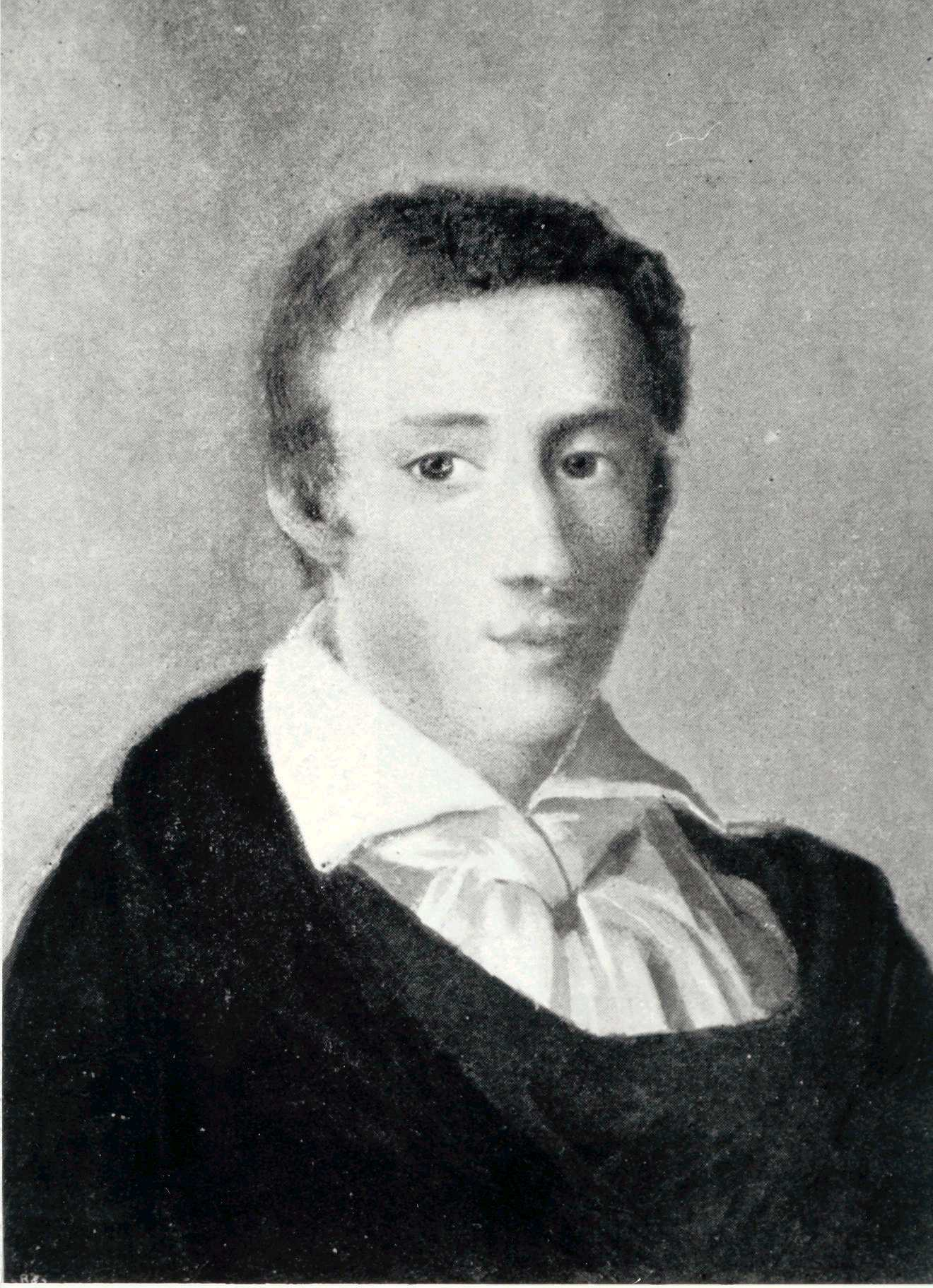
Fryderyk Chopin at 19, by Ambroży Mieroszewski, 1829

The year 1792 saw the Second Partition of Poland, and the tobacco factory was closed down. From 1792 to 1794, he resided in Szafarnia (Dobrzyń county) with Jan Dziewanowski as tutor and teacher to his son Jan Nepomucen Dziewanowski, who later became the godfather to Nicolas' daughter, Ludwika. During the 1794 outbreak of the Kościuszko Uprising, Nicolas joined the Warsaw municipal militia, rising to the rank of lieutenant. After a year he was wounded, just as the uprising was collapsing.

Finding himself again unemployed, he was soon engaged at Czerniewo, in Mazowsze Province, as tutor to the Łączyński family (one of whose daughters, Maria, after later marrying Anastazy Walewski, would gain fame as mistress to Napoleon Bonaparte). Nicolas spent some six years with them. Central and Eastern Europe were then flooded with refugees from areas affected by the revolution, and many of them found the same kind of employment as Nicolas. On Polish lands, it became fashionable for even modestly well-to-do nobility to have a French aristocrat in their homes. Nicolas was not "well-born", so his position bespoke the substantial education and social graces that he had acquired during his previous seven years among his adoptive Polish compatriots.

Nicolas spent the next several years at Żelazowa Wola with Countess Ludwika Skarbek and her family (relatives of the Łączyńskis), tutoring the four children. On 2 June 1806, he married a poor relative of the Skarbeks who lived with them and ran the household, Tekla Justyna Krzyżanowska (daughter of Jakub Krzyżanowski and Antonina, née' Kołomińska, of Długie in Włocławek County). Justyna's brother would be the father of Włodzimierz Krzyżanowski, later a Union general in the American Civil War.

A year later their first daughter was born, Ludwika (Louise), and they moved to a larger house on the estate.

In 1810 their only son Fryderyk was born. His godfather was Fryderyk Skarbek, who had been tutored by Nicolas Chopin.

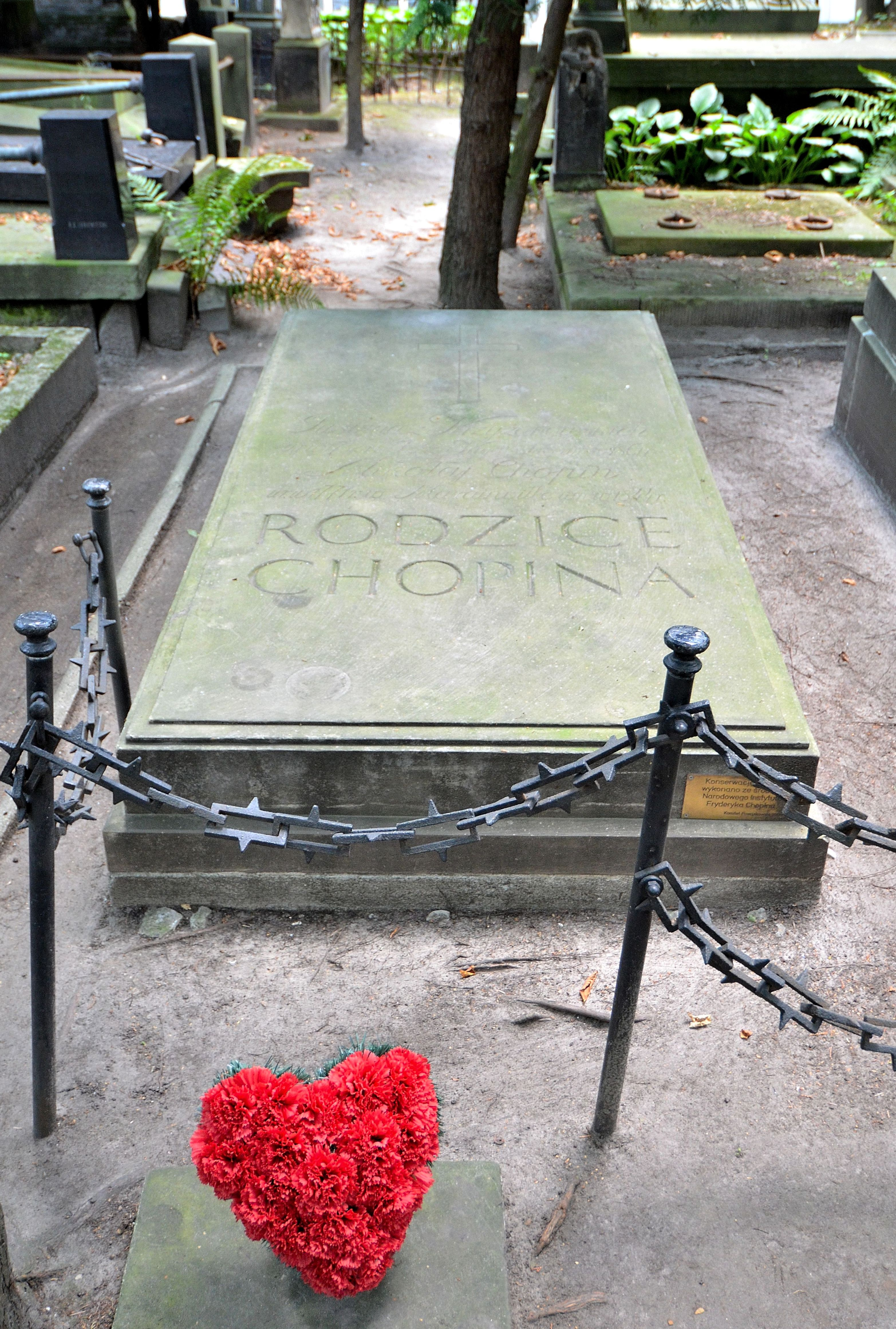
Grave of Nicolas and Justyna Chopin, Powązki Cemetery, Warsaw

Count Skarbek had fallen into debt and fled the Duchy of Warsaw, leaving his wife and four children. At their age they no longer required a tutor, so it was clear the Countess would no longer be able to employ the Chopins. Probably Nicolas had been thinking of moving to Warsaw even before the birth of his son Fryderyk.

In July that year, Nicolas and Justyna and their children moved to Warsaw, to the Saxon Palace, which housed the Warsaw Lyceum where he would teach the French language. In October 1810, Nicolas was appointed "collaborator" (kollaborant) and, in June 1814, a regular professor of French language at the Lyceum. He held this post until the lyceum's closure in 1833.

Apart from these positions, in 1812 he was appointed professor of French language at an Elementary Artillery and Engineers School (Szkoła Elementarna Artylerii i Inżynierów), and in 1820 at a Military Training School (Szkoła Aplikacyjna Wojskowa), where he was active until the school was closed down in 1831.

In 1833, with the reorganization of the educational system following the November 1830 Uprising, Chopin was to have received a position at a planned Pedagogical Institute. While awaiting the new appointment, he received half-wages and evaluated French-teacher candidates and French works proposed for use in public schools. In 1837, when the Institute failed to materialize, Chopin retired. Nevertheless, he continued on the Examining Committee until 1841. In addition, for a brief period in 1837, he was a lecturer in the French language at the Catholic Clerical Academy (Akademia Duchowna) in Warsaw.

Nicolas Chopin died of tuberculosis in Warsaw on 3 May 1844, aged seventy-three. He is interred with his wife at Powązki Cemetery.

== Family ==
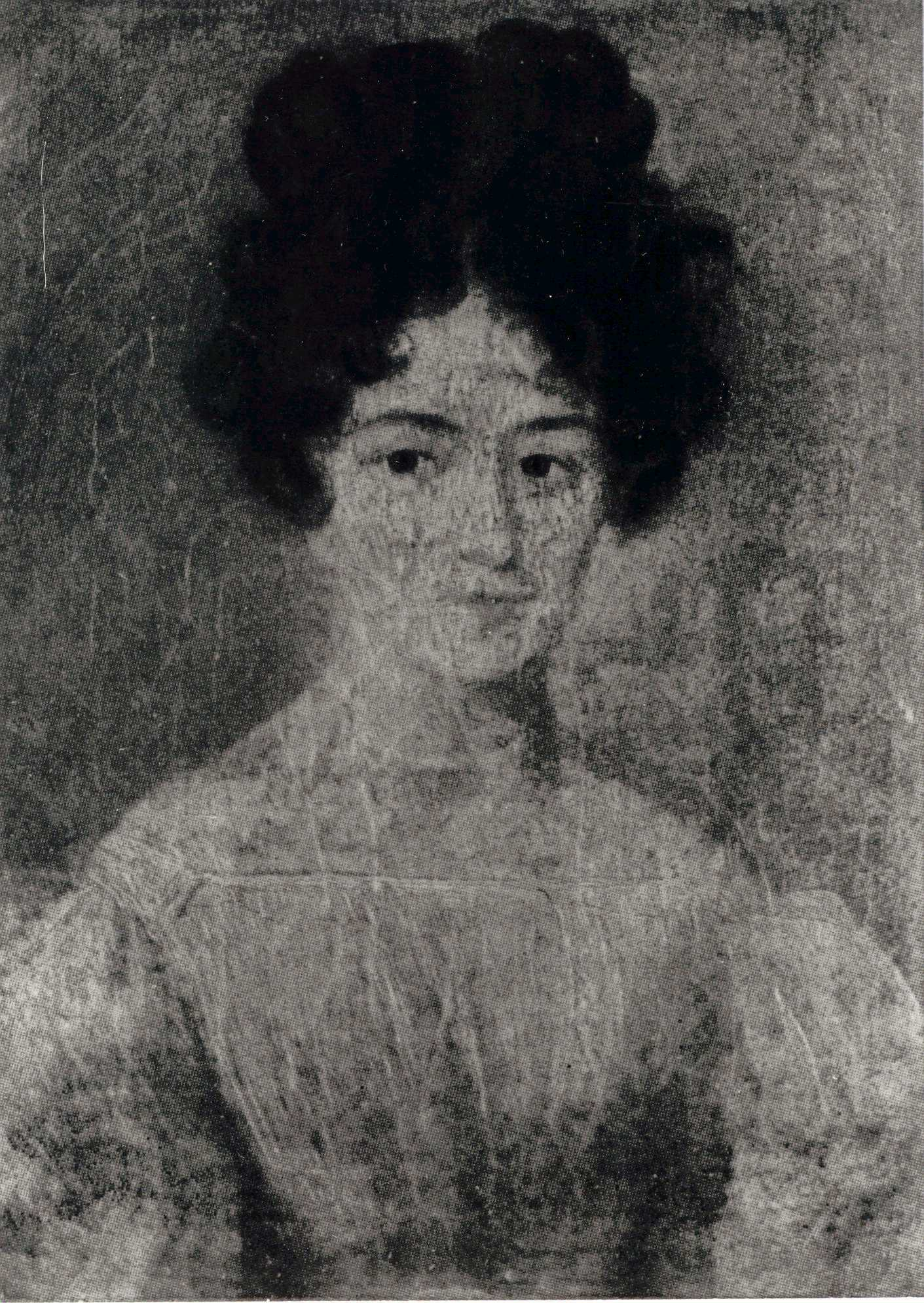
Frédéric Chopin's sister, Ludwika Jędrzejewicz. She gave him his first piano lessons and after his death, by request, smuggled his heart (concealed under her skirts) back to Warsaw.

On 2 June 1806, Chopin married Justyna née Krzyżanowska. The couple had four children: Ludwika, born 1807, who married Józef Jędrzejewicz; their only son, Fryderyk Franciszek, born 1810, a pianist and composer best known as Frédéric Chopin; Izabela, born 9 July 1811, who married Antoni Barciński; and Emilia, born in 1812, who died of tuberculosis in 1827, aged fourteen.

In 1829 Ambroży Mieroszewski painted oil portraits of Mikołaj (Nicolas) Chopin and Justyna Chopin (died October 1861, aged 81) and their surviving children: Fryderyk (the earliest known portrait of him, and one of the most convincing); Fryderyk's older sister Ludwika; and his younger sister Izabela. (That same year, Mieroszewski also painted Fryderyk's first professional piano teacher, Wojciech Żywny.

Fryderyk's first cousin Włodzimierz Krzyżanowski (1824–87) — the son of Fryderyk's mother's brother — became a Union Army brigadier general in the American Civil War.

== Assessment ==
Nicolas Chopin was, according to Wincenty Łopaciński, a man of great intelligence and culture, universally esteemed, a model teacher, and solicitous of his brilliant son Frédéric. Though he had come from a foreign country, with time he became completely Polonized and "undoubtedly considered himself a Pole." This was borne out by his willingness to fight for Poland's independence in the Kościuszko Uprising, after he had earlier refused to return to revolutionary France for fear of being conscripted into the French army.

== See also ==
- Memorials to Frédéric Chopin
