= Jędrzejewicz =

Jędrzejewicz is a Polish surname. Notable people with the surname include:

- Janusz Jędrzejewicz (1885–1951), Polish politician
- Ludwika Jędrzejewicz (1807–1855), sister of Polish composer Frédéric Chopin
- Wacław Jędrzejewicz, Polish diplomat
