= Brochocin =

Brochocin may refer to the following places in Poland:

- Brochocin, Ząbkowice County in Lower Silesian Voivodeship (south-west Poland)
- Brochocin, Złotoryja County in Lower Silesian Voivodeship (south-west Poland)
- Brochocin, Trzebnica County in Lower Silesian Voivodeship (south-west Poland)
- Brochocin, Płock County in Masovian Voivodeship (east-central Poland)
- Brochocin, Sochaczew County in Masovian Voivodeship (east-central Poland)
