= Czerniewo =

Czerniewo may refer to the following places in Poland:

- Czerniewo, Masovian Voivodeship
- Czerniewo, Pomeranian Voivodeship
