= Chomętowo, Masovian Voivodeship =

Chomętowo
- Village
- Location within Poland
- Coordinates: 52°34′N 19°50′E
- Country: Poland
- Voivodeship: Masovian
- County: Płock
- Gmina: Radzanowo

Chomętowo [xɔmɛnˈtɔvɔ] is a village in the administrative district of Gmina Radzanowo, within Płock County, Masovian Voivodeship, in east-central Poland.
