= Wólka, Płock County =

Wólka
- Village
- Location within Poland
- Coordinates: 52°34′N 19°55′E
- Country: Poland
- Voivodeship: Masovian
- County: Płock
- Gmina: Radzanowo

Population
  - Total: 120
- Time zone: UTC+1 (CET)
  - Summer (DST): UTC+2 (CEST)
- Vehicle registration: WPL

Wólka [ˈvulka] is a village in the administrative district of Gmina Radzanowo, within Płock County, Masovian Voivodeship, in central Poland.

Two Polish citizens were murdered by Nazi Germany in the village during World War II.
