= Stare Gulczewo =

- Village
- Location within Poland
- Coordinates: 52°32′58″N 19°48′53″E
- Country: Poland
- Voivodeship: Masovian
- County: Płock
- Gmina: Słupno
- Time zone: UTC+1 (CET)
  - Summer (DST): UTC+2 (CEST)
- Postal code: 09-472
- Vehicle registration: WPL

Stare Gulczewo [ˈstarɛ ɡulˈt͡ʂɛvɔ] is a village in the administrative district of Gmina Słupno, within Płock County, Masovian Voivodeship, in central Poland.

== History ==
During the German occupation in World War II, the occupiers operated a forced labour camp for Poles in Gulczewo in 1944. After dissolution, the prisoners were sent to a camp in Płock.
