= Kępa Ośnicka =

- Settlement
- Location within Poland
- Coordinates: 52°30′22″N 19°44′33″E
- Country: Poland
- Voivodeship: Masovian
- County: Płock
- Gmina: Słupno
- Population: 0

Kępa Ośnicka [ˈkɛmpa ɔɕˈnit͡ska] is a former settlement in the administrative district of Gmina Słupno, within Płock County, Masovian Voivodeship, in east-central Poland.
