= Gmina Słupno =

Gmina Słupno Słupno Commune
- Gmina
- Coat of arms
- Interactive map of Gmina Słupno
- Coordinates (Słupno): 52°30′18″N 19°50′14″E
- Country: Poland
- Voivodeship: Masovian
- County: Płock County
- Seat: Słupno

Area
  - Total: 74.71 km^{2} (28.85 sq mi)

Population (2006)
  - Total: 5,377
  - Density: 71.97/km^{2} (186.4/sq mi)
- Time zone: UTC+1 (CET)
  - Summer (DST): UTC+2 (CEST)
- Vehicle registration: WPL
- Website: http://www.slupno.eu

Gmina Słupno is a rural gmina (administrative district) in Płock County, Masovian Voivodeship, in central Poland. Its seat is the village of Słupno, which lies approximately 10 kilometres (6 mi) south-east of Płock and 86 km (53 mi) north-west of Warsaw.

The gmina covers an area of 74.71 square kilometres (28.8 sq mi), and as of 2006 its total population is 5,377.

== Villages ==
Gmina Słupno contains the villages and settlements of Barcikowo, Bielino Wirginia, Borowiczki-Pieńki, Cekanowo, Kępa Ośnicka, Liszyno, Mijakowo, Mirosław, Miszewko Strzałkowskie, Miszewko-Stefany, Nowe Gulczewo, Ramutowo, Rydzyno, Sambórz, Słupno, Stare Gulczewo, Święcieniec, Szeligi and Wykowo.

== Neighbouring gminas ==
Gmina Słupno is bordered by the city of Płock and by the gminas of Bodzanów, Gąbin, Radzanowo and Słubice.
