= Woźniki-Paklewy =

- Village
- Location within Poland
- Coordinates: 52°36′29″N 19°54′53″E
- Country: Poland
- Voivodeship: Masovian
- County: Płock
- Gmina: Radzanowo

Woźniki-Paklewy [vɔʑˈniki paˈklɛvɨ] is a village in the administrative district of Gmina Radzanowo, within Płock County, Masovian Voivodeship, in east-central Poland.
