= Gmina Radzanowo =

Gmina Radzanowo Radzanowo Commune
- Gmina
- Coat of arms
- Interactive map of Gmina Radzanowo
- Coordinates (Radzanowo): 52°35′N 19°54′E
- Country: Poland
- Voivodeship: Masovian
- County: Płock County
- Seat: Radzanowo

Area
  - Total: 104.32 km^{2} (40.28 sq mi)

Population (2006)
  - Total: 7,322
  - Density: 70.19/km^{2} (181.8/sq mi)
- Time zone: UTC+1 (CET)
  - Summer (DST): UTC+2 (CEST)
- Vehicle registration: WPL
- Website: http://www.radzanowo.pl

Gmina Radzanowo is a rural gmina (administrative district) in Płock County, Masovian Voivodeship, in central Poland. Its seat is the village of Radzanowo, which lies approximately 15 kilometres (9 mi) east of Płock and 86 km (53 mi) north-west of Warsaw.

The gmina covers an area of 104.32 square kilometres (40.3 sq mi), and as of 2006 its population was 7,322. About 91% of the land in the commune is agricultural.

== Villages ==
Gmina Radzanowo contains the villages and settlements of:
Białkowo, Brochocin, Brochocinek, Chełstowo, Chomętowo, Ciółkówko, Ciółkowo, Czerniewo, Dźwierzno, Juryszewo, Kosino, Kostrogaj, Łoniewo, Męczenino, Nowe Boryszewo, Radzanowo, Radzanowo-Dębniki, Radzanowo-Lasocin, Rogozino, Ślepkowo Królewskie, Ślepkowo Szlacheckie, Śniegocin, Stare Boryszewo, Stróżewko, Szczytno, Trębin, Wodzymin, Wólka, Woźniki and Woźniki-Paklewy.

== Neighbouring gminas ==
Gmina Radzanowo is bordered by the city of Płock and by the gminas of Bielsk, Bodzanów, Bulkowo, Słupno, Stara Biała and Staroźreby.
