= Wodzymin =

- Village
- Location within Poland
- Coordinates: 52°34′N 19°51′E
- Country: Poland
- Voivodeship: Masovian
- County: Płock
- Gmina: Radzanowo

Wodzymin [vɔˈd͡zɨmin] is a village in the administrative district of Gmina Radzanowo, within Płock County, Masovian Voivodeship, in east-central Poland.
