= Radzanowo =

- Village
- Saint Florian church in Radzanowo

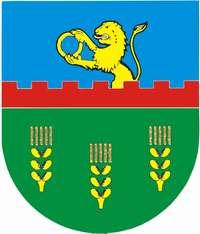
- Coat of arms

- Location within Poland
- Coordinates: 52°35′N 19°54′E
- Country: Poland
- Voivodeship: Masovian
- County: Płock
- Gmina: Radzanowo

Population
  - Total: 860
- Time zone: UTC+1 (CET)
  - Summer (DST): UTC+2 (CEST)
- Vehicle registration: WPL

Radzanowo [rad͡zaˈnɔvɔ] is a village in Płock County, Masovian Voivodeship, in central Poland. It is the seat of the gmina (administrative district) called Gmina Radzanowo.

Two Polish citizens were murdered by Nazi Germany in the village during World War II.
