= Brochocinek, Masovian Voivodeship =

Brochocinek
- Village
- Location within Poland
- Coordinates: 52°35′03″N 19°47′15″E
- Country: Poland
- Voivodeship: Masovian
- County: Płock
- Gmina: Radzanowo

Brochocinek [brɔxɔˈt͡ɕinɛk] is a village in the administrative district of Gmina Radzanowo, within Płock County, Masovian Voivodeship, in east-central Poland.
