= Ciółkówko =

Village in Gmina Radzanowo, Poland

- Village
- Location within Poland
- Coordinates: 52°36′24″N 19°51′51″E
- Country: Poland
- Voivodeship: Masovian
- County: Płock
- Gmina: Radzanowo

Ciółkówko [t͡ɕuu̯ˈkufkɔ] is a village in the administrative district of Gmina Radzanowo, within Płock County, Masovian Voivodeship, in east-central Poland.
