= Święcieniec =

- Village
- Location within Poland
- Coordinates: 52°32′N 19°55′E
- Country: Poland
- Voivodeship: Masovian
- County: Płock
- Gmina: Słupno

Święcieniec (Polish pronunciation: [ɕfjɛɲˈt͡ɕɛɲɛt͡s]) is a village in the administrative district of Gmina Słupno, within Płock County, Masovian Voivodeship, in east-central Poland.
