= Stróżewko, Masovian Voivodeship =

Stróżewko
- Village
- Location within Poland
- Coordinates: 52°33′59″N 19°46′18″E
- Country: Poland
- Voivodeship: Masovian
- County: Płock
- Gmina: Radzanowo
- Population (approx.): 200

Stróżewko [struˈʐɛfkɔ] is a village in the administrative district of Gmina Radzanowo, within Płock County, Masovian Voivodeship, in east-central Poland.
