= Radzanowo-Lasocin =

- Village
- Location within Poland
- Coordinates: 52°34′05″N 19°52′59″E
- Country: Poland
- Voivodeship: Masovian
- County: Płock
- Gmina: Radzanowo

Radzanowo-Lasocin [rad͡zaˈnɔvɔ laˈsɔt͡ɕin] is a village in the administrative district of Gmina Radzanowo, within Płock County, Masovian Voivodeship, in east-central Poland.
