= Borowiczki-Pieńki =

Village in Gmina Słupno, Poland

- Village
- Location within Poland
- Coordinates: 52°30′00″N 19°47′00″E
- Country: Poland
- Voivodeship: Masovian
- County: Płock
- Gmina: Słupno

Borowiczki-Pieńki [bɔrɔˈvit͡ʂki ˈpjɛɲki] is a village in the administrative district of Gmina Słupno, within Płock County, Masovian Voivodeship, in east-central Poland.
