= Stare Boryszewo =

- Village
- Location within Poland
- Coordinates: 52°33′34″N 19°46′56″E
- Country: Poland
- Voivodeship: Masovian
- County: Płock
- Gmina: Radzanowo

Stare Boryszewo [ˈstarɛ bɔrɨˈʂɛvɔ] is a village in the administrative district of Gmina Radzanowo, within Płock County, Masovian Voivodeship, in east-central Poland.
