= Słupno, Płock County =

Słupno
- Village
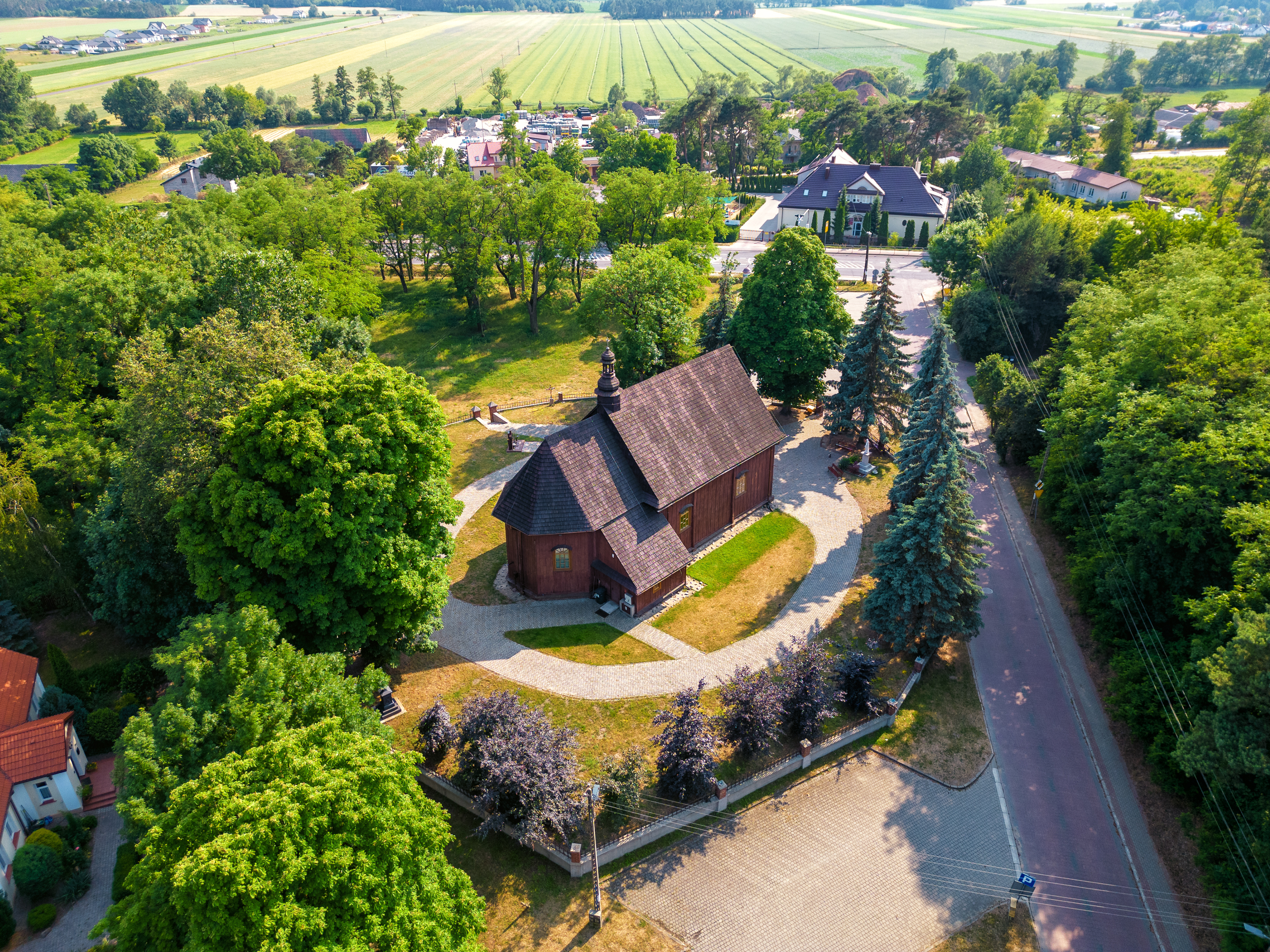
- Saint Martin church in Słupno

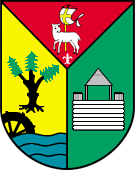
- Coat of arms

- Location within Poland
- Coordinates: 52°30′18″N 19°50′14″E
- Country: Poland
- Voivodeship: Masovian
- County: Płock
- Gmina: Słupno

Population
  - Total: 790
- Time zone: UTC+1 (CET)
  - Summer (DST): UTC+2 (CEST)
- Postal code: 09-472
- Vehicle registration: WPL

Słupno [ˈswupnɔ] is a village in Płock County, Masovian Voivodeship, in central Poland. It is the seat of the gmina (administrative district) called Gmina Słupno.

== History ==
The history of the village dates back to the 10th century, when a medieval Slavic stronghold was built at the site. The oldest known mention of the village dates back to the 12th century. In 1254, komes Żyro (local administration official) granted the village to the Płock Cathedral, and in 1443, Płock bishop Paweł Giżycki granted the village to archdeacon Ścibor.

During the German occupation of Poland (World War II), Archbishop of Płock Antoni Julian Nowowiejski, and suffragan Bishop Leon Wetmański, two of the 108 Blessed Polish Martyrs of World War II, were imprisoned in the village, before they were murdered in the Soldau concentration camp in 1941. In 1942 the Germans carried out a massacre of 25 Polish inhabitants of Słupno and nearby settlements. There is a monument dedicated to the victims in the village.

There is a historic preserved wooden church of St. Martin in the village.
