= Rydzyno =

- Village
- Location within Poland
- Coordinates: 52°29′22″N 19°45′42″E
- Country: Poland
- Voivodeship: Masovian
- County: Płock
- Gmina: Słupno

Rydzyno [rɨˈd͡zɨnɔ] is a village in the administrative district of Gmina Słupno, within Płock County, Masovian Voivodeship, in east-central Poland.
