= Jan Nepomucen Białobłocki =

Polish composer (1806–1828)

Jan Nepomucen Białobłocki (c.1806—31 March 1828, Sokołowo, Golub-Dobrzyń) was a childhood friend and correspondent of Polish composer Frédéric Chopin.

Born into an aristocratic family, Białobłocki began in 1816 to study at the Warsaw Lyceum, where one of his teachers was Nicolas Chopin, the composer's father; Białobłocki lodged with the Chopin family. In 1823 Białobłocki commenced studies at Warsaw University. He became a close friend of Frédéric, who addressed numerous letters to him, using Białobłocki's nickname, Jasio.

In 1828 Białobłocki died of tuberculosis of the bone, unmarried, at his family estate of Sokołowo.
