= Szeligi, Płock County =

Szeligi
- Village
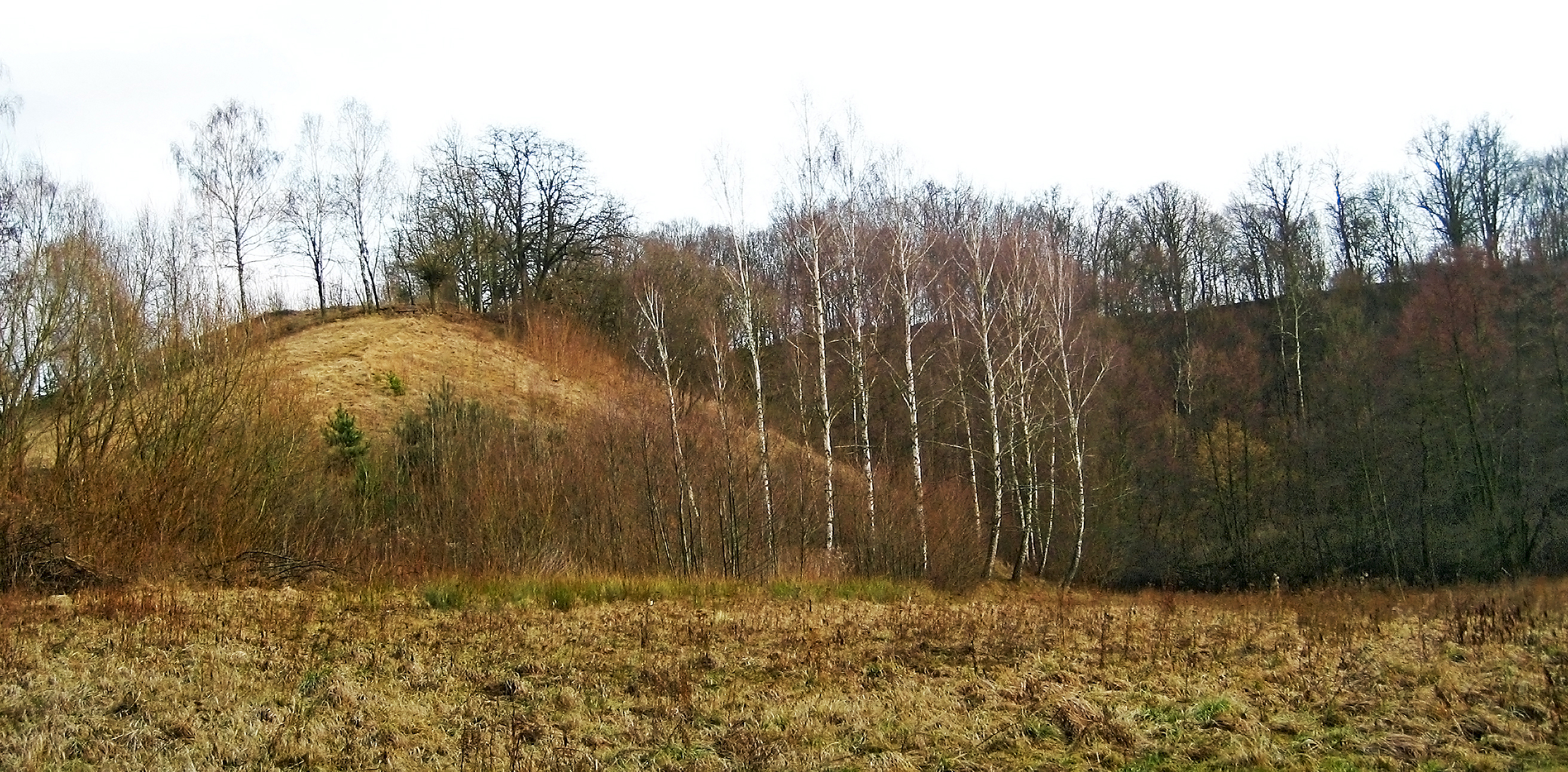
- Early medieval stronghold in Szeligi

- Location within Poland
- Coordinates: 52°31′02″N 19°52′06″E
- Country: Poland
- Voivodeship: Masovian
- County: Płock
- Gmina: Słupno
- Time zone: UTC+1 (CET)
  - Summer (DST): UTC+2 (CEST)
- Postal code: 09-472
- Vehicle registration: WPL

Szeligi [ʂɛˈliɡi] is a village in the administrative district of Gmina Słupno, in Płock County, Masovian Voivodeship, in central Poland.

Szeligi is one of the older villages in the area, as an early medieval Slavic stronghold existed at the site in the 6th–7th century. In the past the village was divided into two parts, called Szeligi Duże ("Big Szeligi") and Szeligi Małe ("Little Szeligi").
