= Białkowo, Masovian Voivodeship =

Białkowo
- Village
- Location within Poland
- Coordinates: 52°33′N 19°51′E
- Country: Poland
- Voivodeship: Masovian
- County: Płock
- Gmina: Radzanowo

Białkowo [bjau̯ˈkɔvɔ] is a village in the administrative district of Gmina Radzanowo, within Płock County, Masovian Voivodeship, in east-central Poland.
