= Cekanowo, Gmina Słupno =

Cekanowo
- Village
- Location within Poland
- Coordinates: 52°31′12″N 19°50′31″E
- Country: Poland
- Voivodeship: Masovian
- County: Płock
- Gmina: Słupno

Cekanowo [t͡sɛkaˈnɔvɔ] is a village in the administrative district of Gmina Słupno, within Płock County, Masovian Voivodeship, in central Poland.
