= Miszewko-Stefany =

- Village
- Location within Poland
- Coordinates: 52°32′00″N 19°51′00″E
- Country: Poland
- Voivodeship: Masovian
- County: Płock
- Gmina: Słupno

Miszewko-Stefany [miˈʂɛfkɔ stɛˈfanɨ] is a village in the administrative district of Gmina Słupno, within Płock County, Masovian Voivodeship, in east-central Poland.
