= Wykowo, Masovian Voivodeship =

Wykowo
- Village
- Location within Poland
- Coordinates: 52°29′N 19°51′E
- Country: Poland
- Voivodeship: Masovian
- County: Płock
- Gmina: Słupno

Wykowo [vɨˈkɔvɔ] is a village in the administrative district of Gmina Słupno, within Płock County, Masovian Voivodeship, in east-central Poland.
