= Marainville-sur-Madon =

- Commune
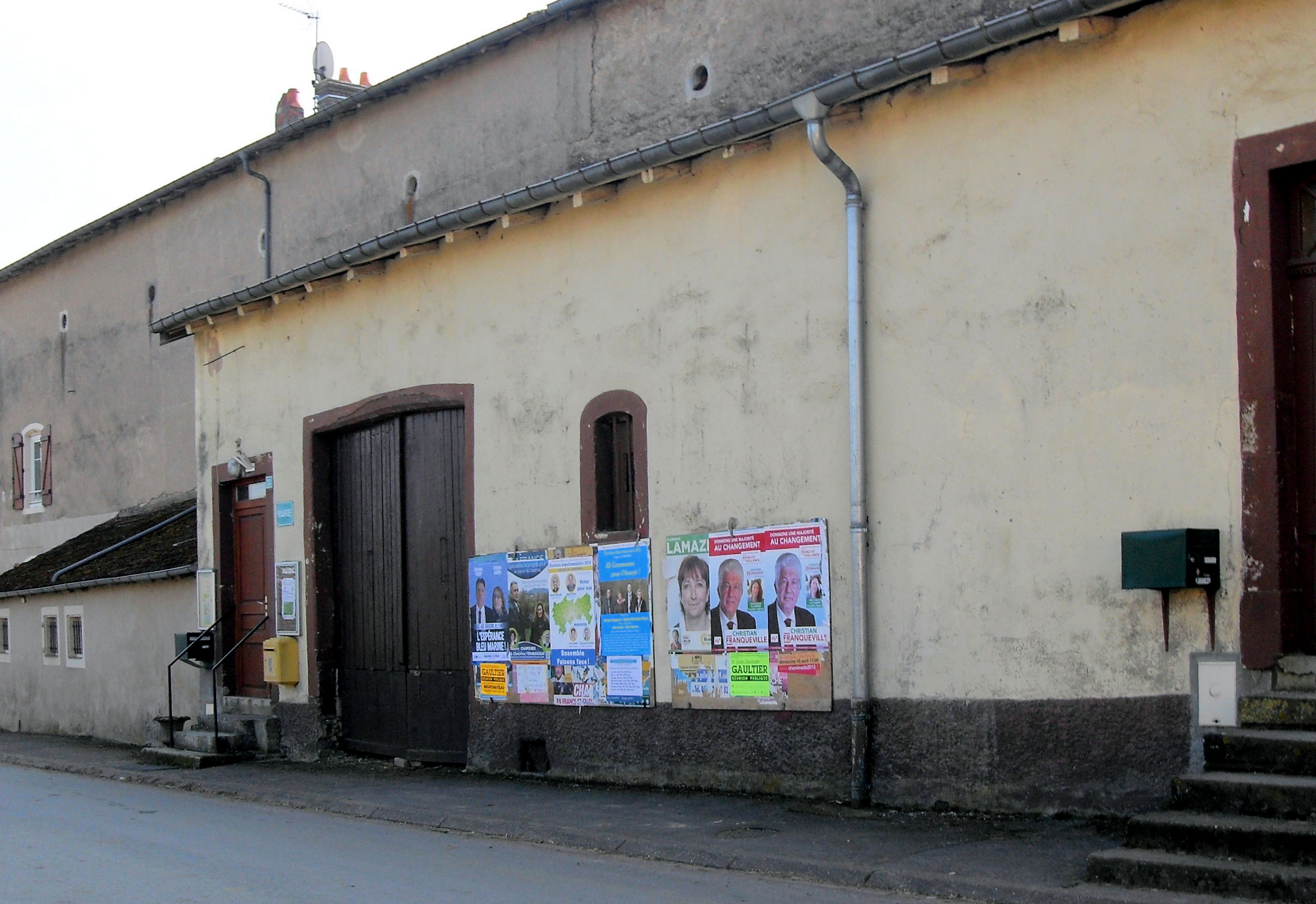
- The town hall in Marainville-sur-Madon

- Coat of arms
- Location of Marainville-sur-Madon
- Location within France Location within Grand Est
- Coordinates: 48°23′55″N 6°10′12″E
- Country: France
- Region: Grand Est
- Department: Vosges
- Arrondissement: Neufchâteau
- Canton: Charmes
- Intercommunality: CC Mirecourt Dompaire

Government
  - Mayor (2020–2026): Anne Simonin
- Area^{1}: 4.88 km^{2} (1.88 sq mi)
- Elevation: 300 m (980 ft)
- Highest elevation: 307 m (1,007 ft)
- Lowest elevation: 247 m (810 ft)
- Population (2023): 94
  - Density: 19/km^{2} (50/sq mi)
- Time zone: UTC+01:00 (CET)
  - Summer (DST): UTC+02:00 (CEST)
- INSEE/Postal code: 88286 /88130
- ^{1} French Land Register data, which excludes lakes, ponds, glaciers > 1 km^{2} (0.386 sq mi or 247 acres) and river estuaries.

Marainville-sur-Madon (French pronunciation: [maʁɛ̃vil syʁ madɔ̃], literally Marainville on Madon) is a commune in the Vosges department in Grand Est in northeastern France.

== Geography ==
Marainville is positioned in the north-east of the department. It is the last commune traversed by the Madon before that river continues north into the adjacent département of Meurthe-et-Moselle.

The land is devoted to agriculture: there is no longer any forest in the commune.

== Interesting discovery ==
A seventh-century tomb was identified under a tumulus in 1977 and excavated between 1986 and 1988. It appears to be connected with the pre-Christian fortifications at Saxon-Sion in Meurthe-et-Moselle.

== Personalities ==
Michał Jan Pac (1730-1787), a Polish nobleman exiled after the defeat of the Bar Confederation, bought the castle and Marainville in 1780; his steward, Adam Weydlich, made acquaintance with the village syndic, François Chopin.

François Chopin had a son, Nicolas. After Pac's death, the Weydlichs left France for Poland, and Nicolas Chopin emigrated with them; in 1810, his better known son, Frédéric Chopin, was born in the Polish village of Żelazowa Wola.

== See also ==
- Communes of the Vosges department
