= Liszyno =

- Village
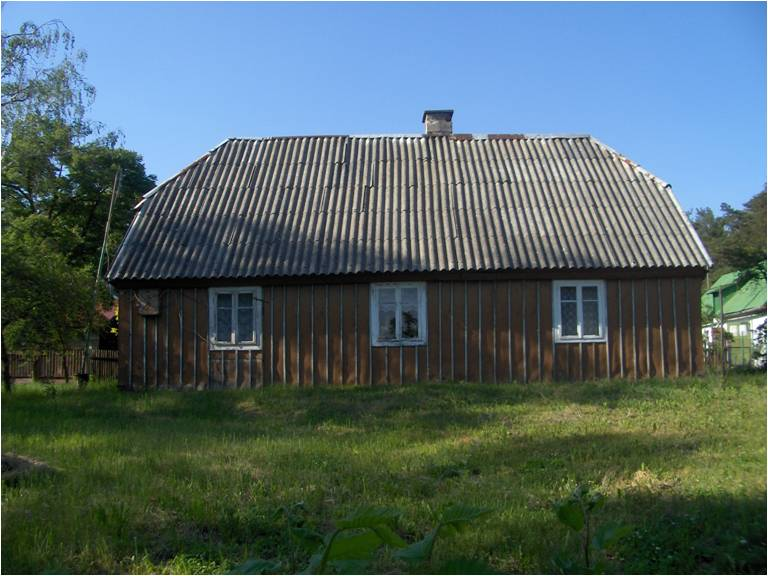

- Location within Poland
- Coordinates: 52°29′00″N 19°47′00″E
- Country: Poland
- Voivodeship: Masovian
- County: Płock
- Gmina: Słupno

Liszyno [liˈʂɨnɔ] is a village in the administrative district of Gmina Słupno, within Płock County, Masovian Voivodeship, in east-central Poland.
