= Ambroży Mieroszewski =

Polish painter (1802–1884)

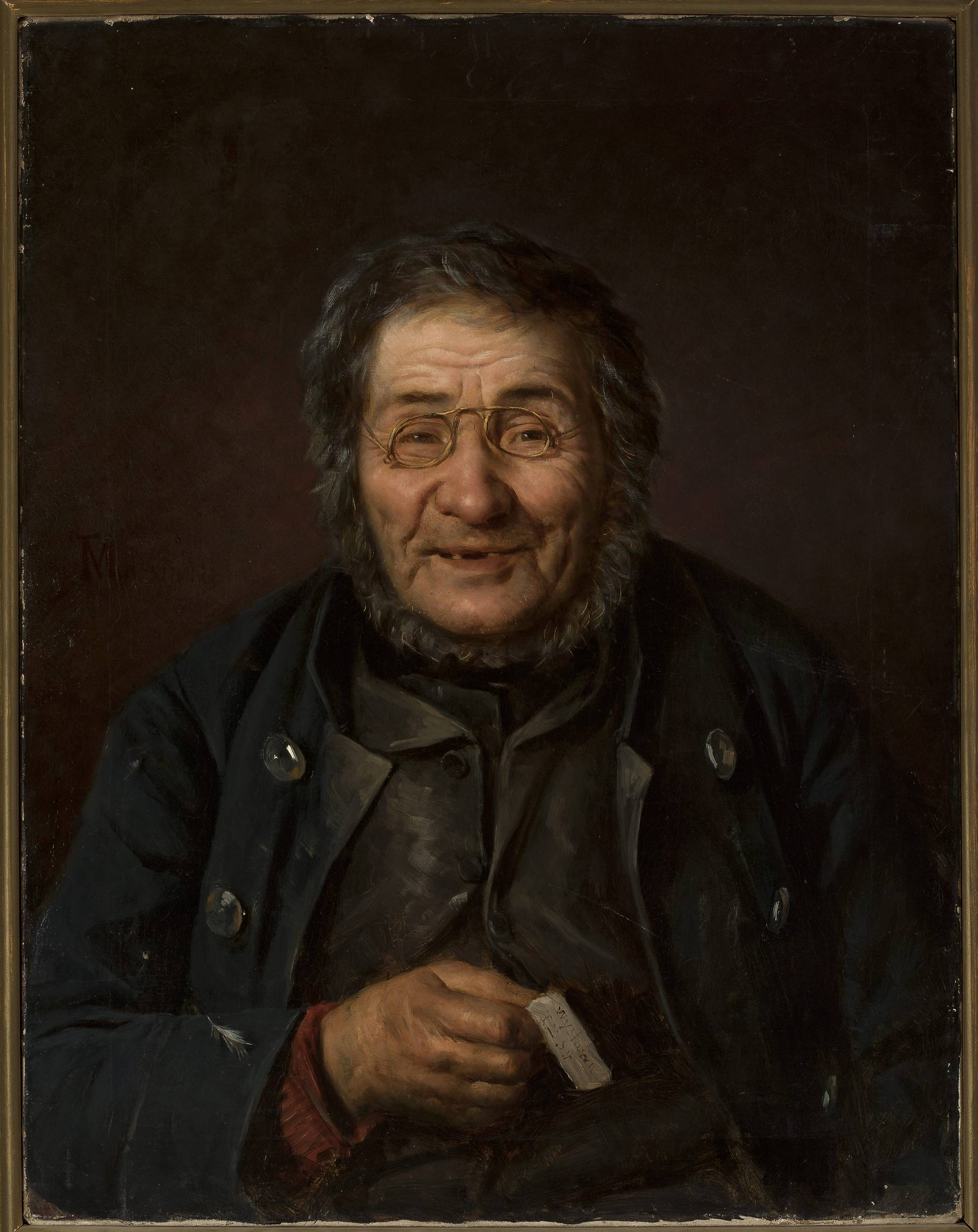
Portrait of Ambroży Mieroszewski

Ambroży Mieroszewski (1802–1884) was a Polish painter who was Frédéric Chopin's first known portraitist.

== Life ==
He did his schooling in the Royal Warsaw University (now University of Warsaw) where he won a bronze medal in 1823 for a painting of the Laocoön Group. Mieroszewski remained active in Warsaw, in the Kingdom of Poland, at least up to 1829.

== Works ==
Mieroszewski's works included oil portraits, painted in 1829, of composer Frédéric Chopin (the earliest known portrait of him); his parents — Nicolas Chopin (1771–1844) and Justyna Chopin, née Krzyżanowska (1782–1861); the older sister of Fryderyk (as he then was) Ludwika (1807–1855), and his younger sister Izabela (1811–1881). In that same year, Mieroszewski also painted a portrait of the Fryderyk's first professional piano teacher, Wojciech Żywny.

All six portraits were the property of Laura Ciechomska of Warsaw when they were lost in the opening days of World War II, in September 1939. Only black-and-white photographs of them survive, though attempts have been made to reconstruct the paintings in color—the portrait of Fryderyk (Frédéric), in 1968 by Anna Chamiec; the other Chopin family members, in 1969 by Jan Zamoyski; and Wojciech Żywny, in 1969 by Jadwiga Kunicka-Bogacka.

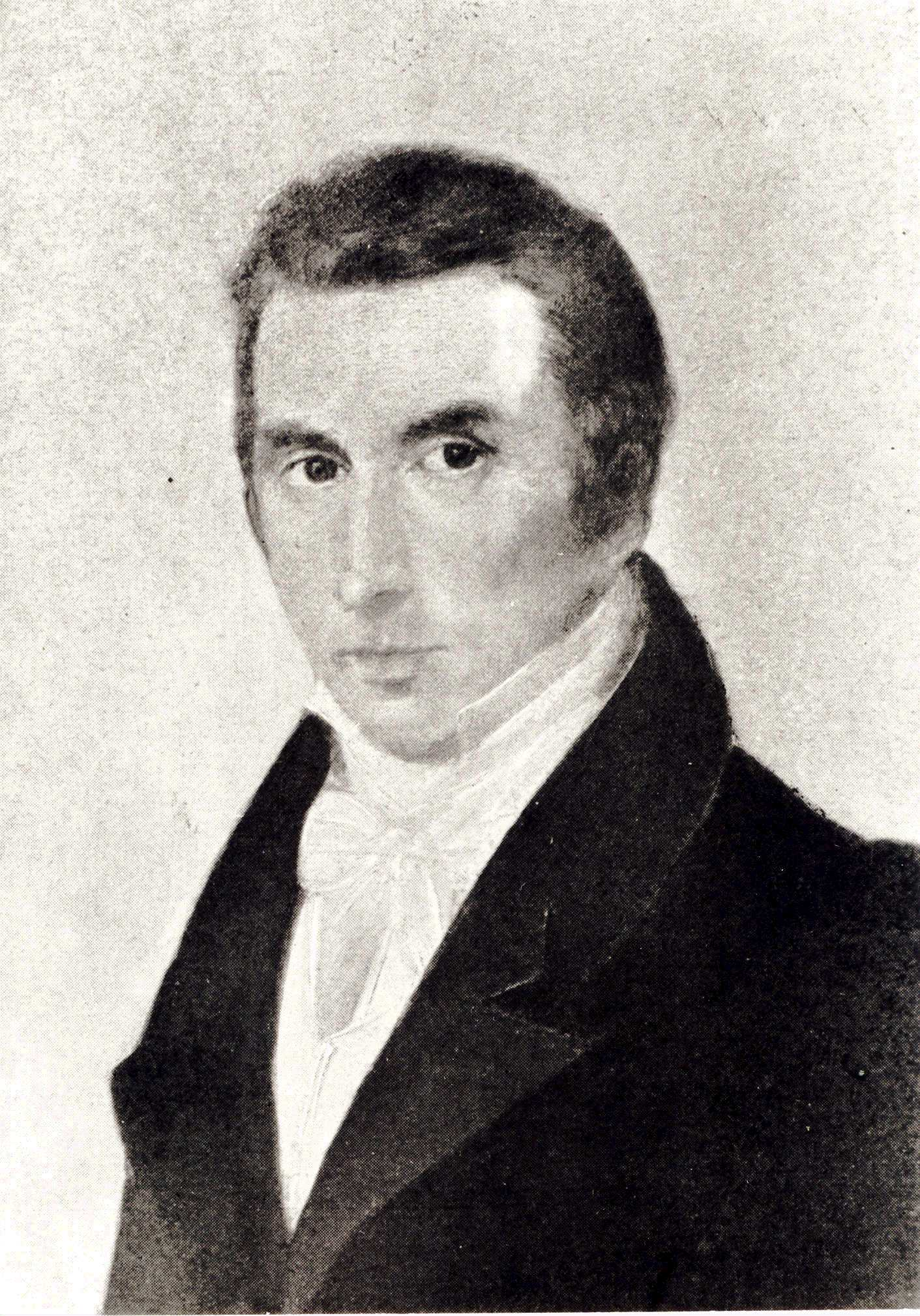
Nicolas Chopin

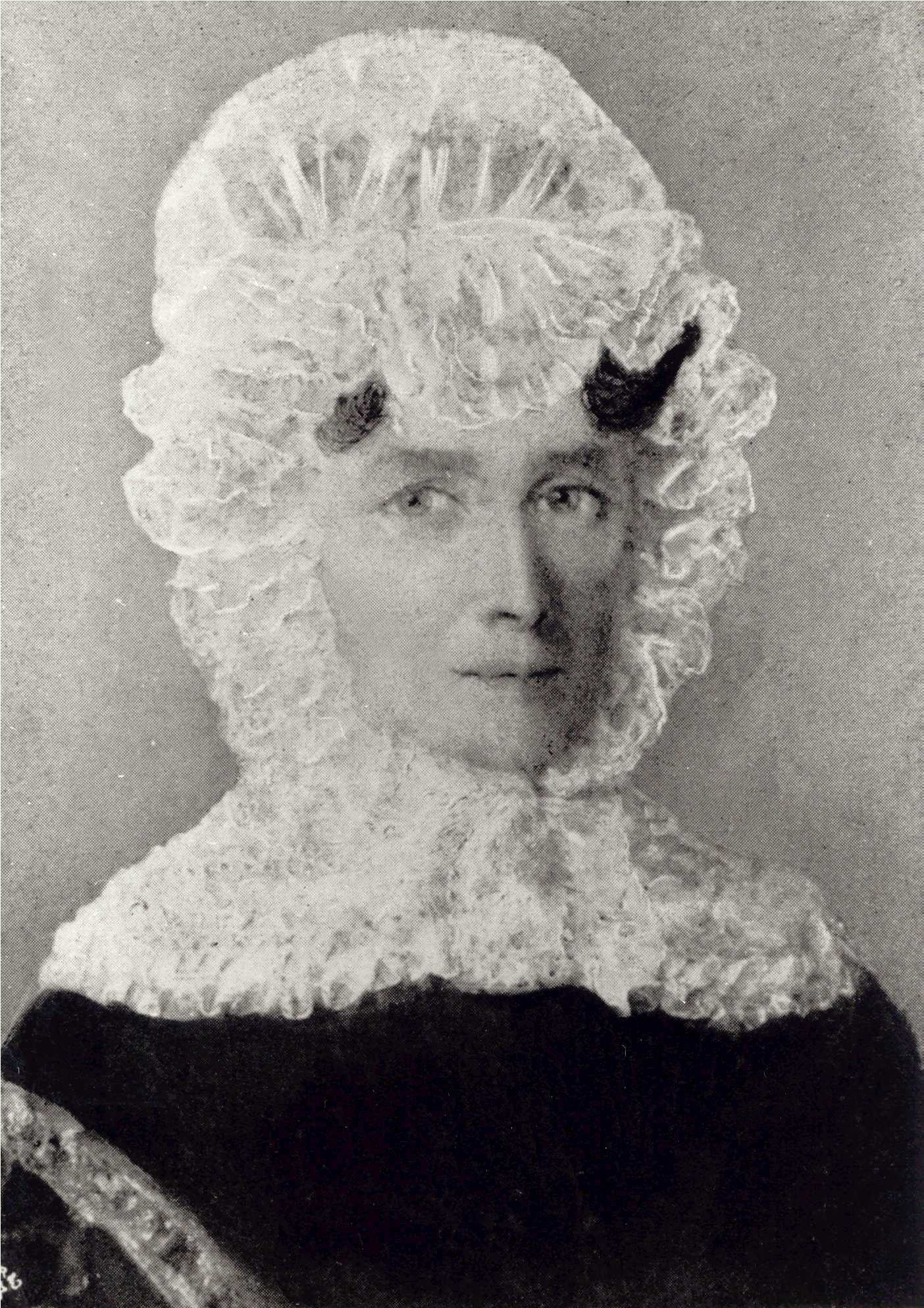
Justyna Chopin

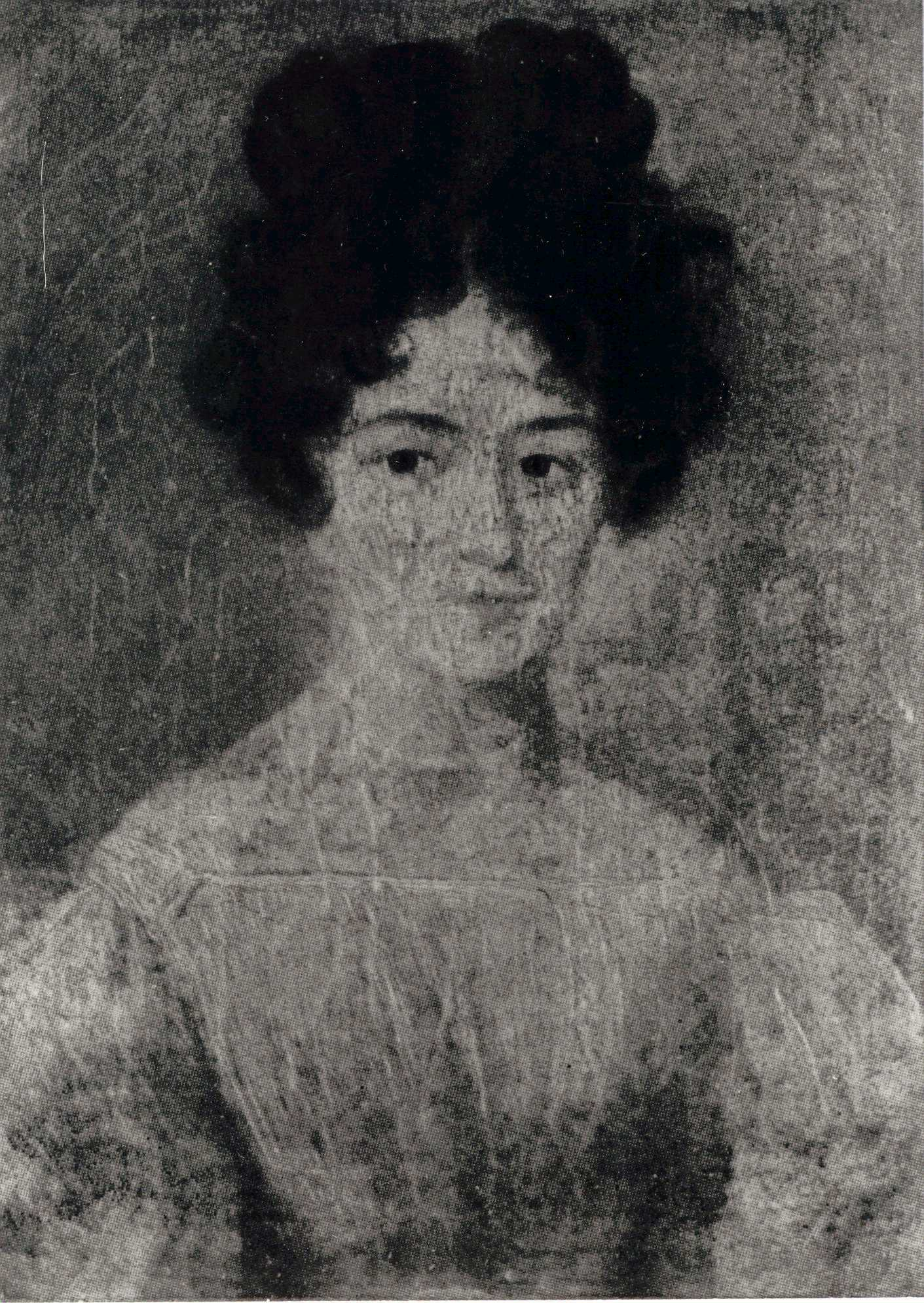
Ludwika Chopin

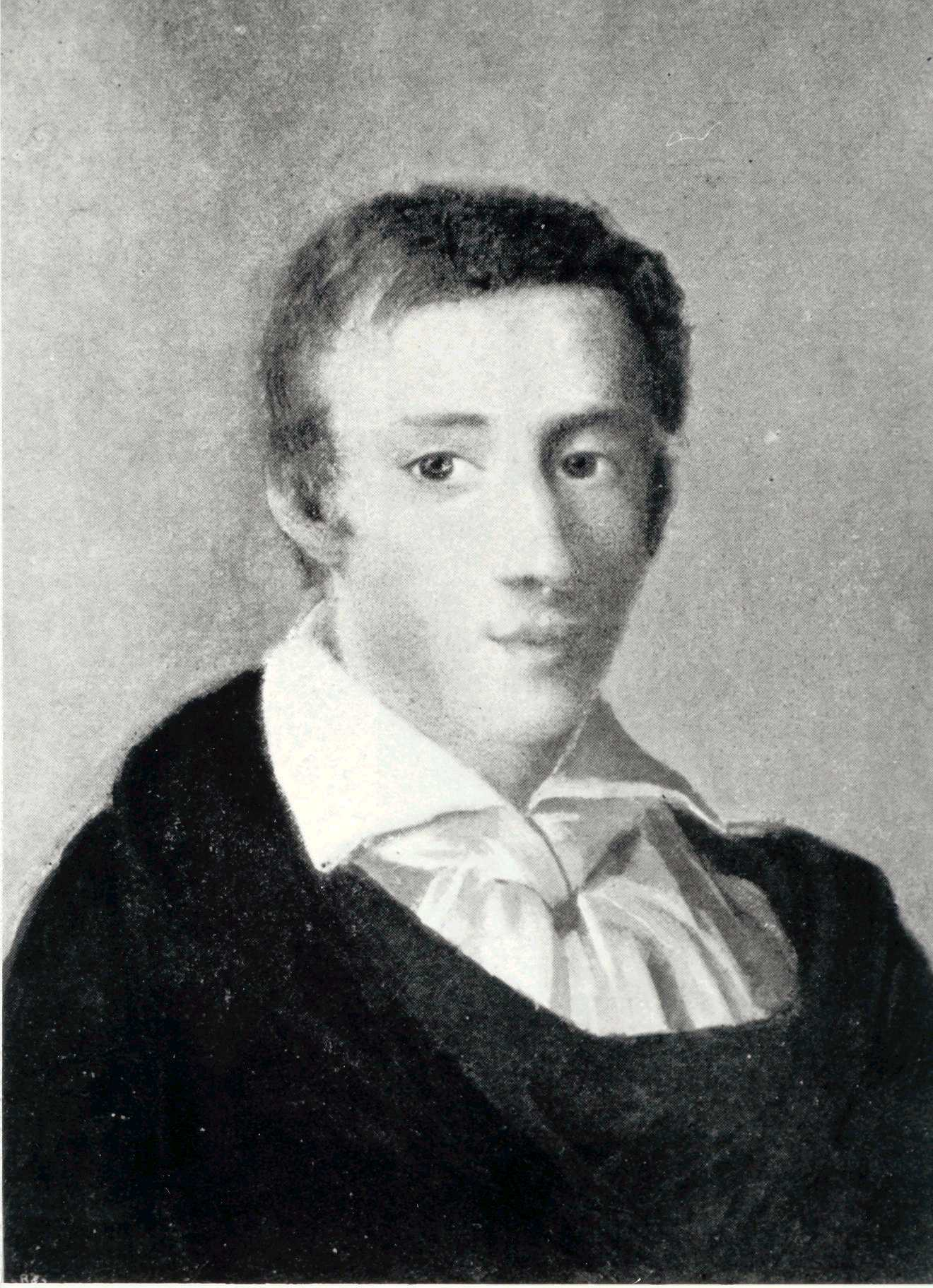
Fryderyk Chopin

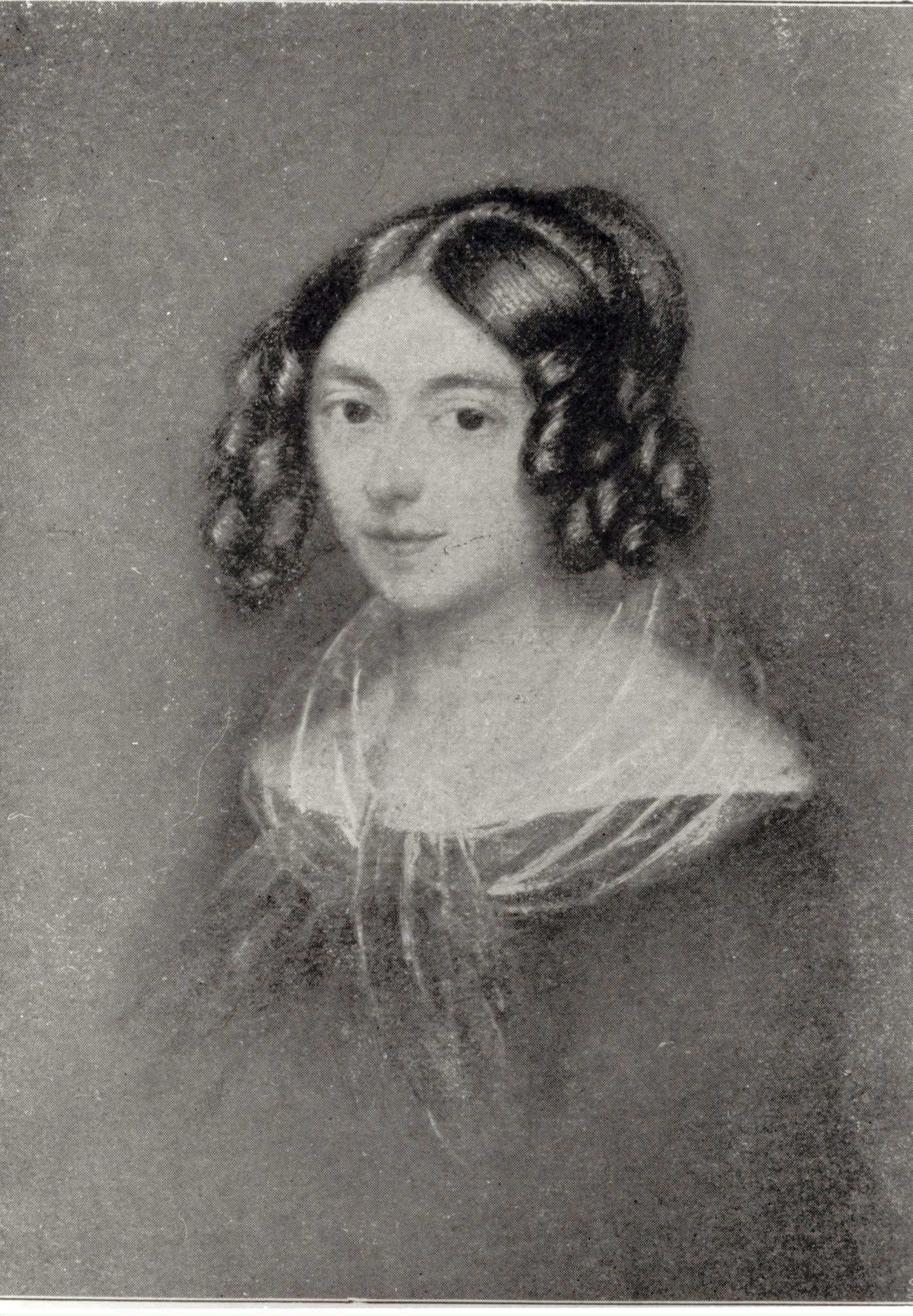
Izabela Chopin

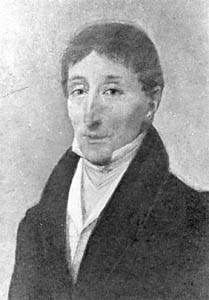
Wojciech Żywny

The set of five 1829 portraits of the surviving members of the Chopin family (the youngest child, Emilia, had died of tuberculosis at age 14 in 1827) were painted about a year before Fryderyk would leave Warsaw and his native land forever in November 1830.

The 19-year-old composer's portrait provides unique iconographic evidence of the state of his health this early into his precocious career. In 1913 Édouard Ganche wrote that the portrait shows "a youth threatened by tuberculosis. His skin is very white, he has a prominent Adam's apple and sunken cheeks, even his ears show a form characteristic of consumptives." His younger sister Emilia had already died of tuberculosis in 1827, and his father would do so in 1844.

Featured are other portraits of the painter, most notably including Mikołaj Wiorogórski.

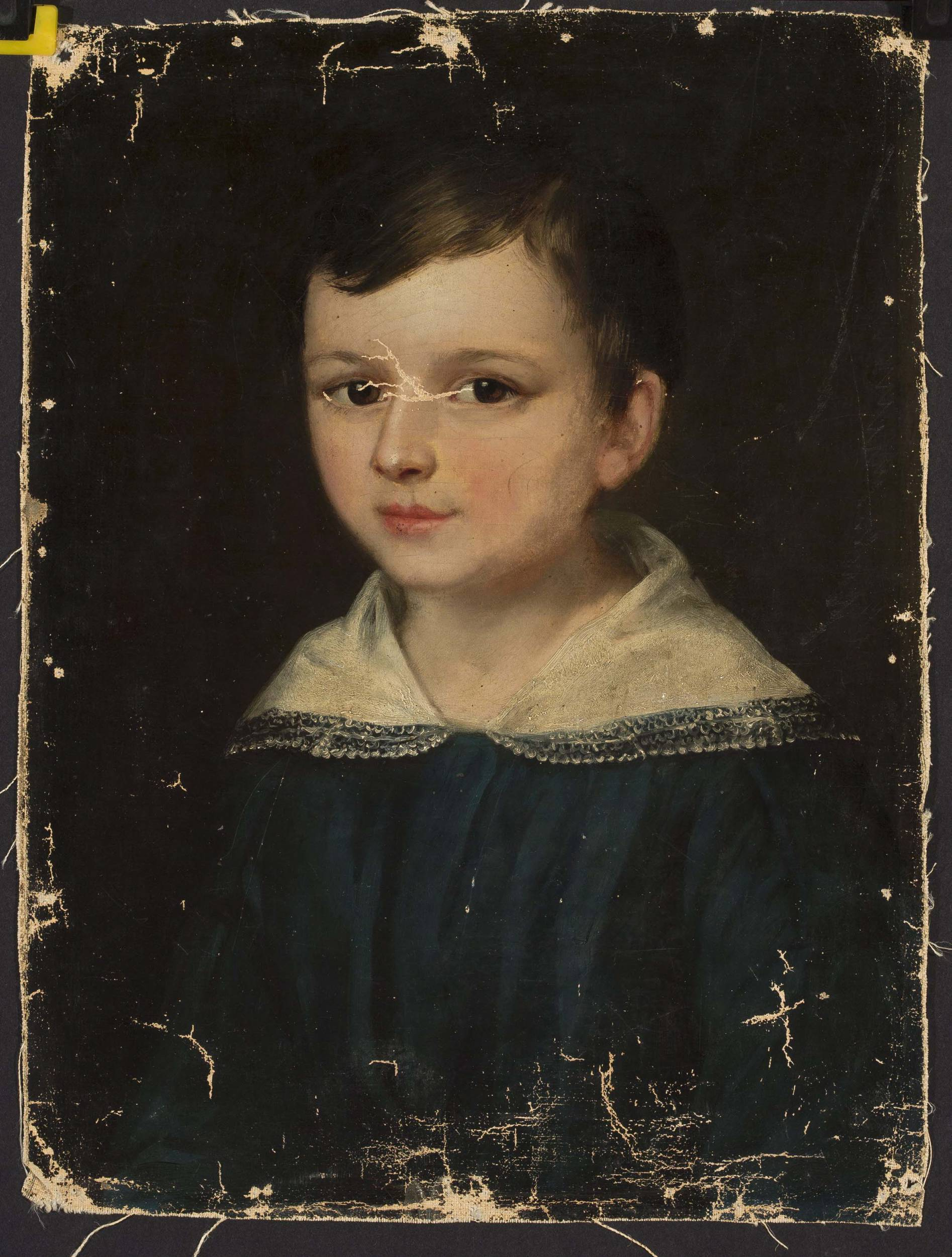
Oktawian Szukiewicz

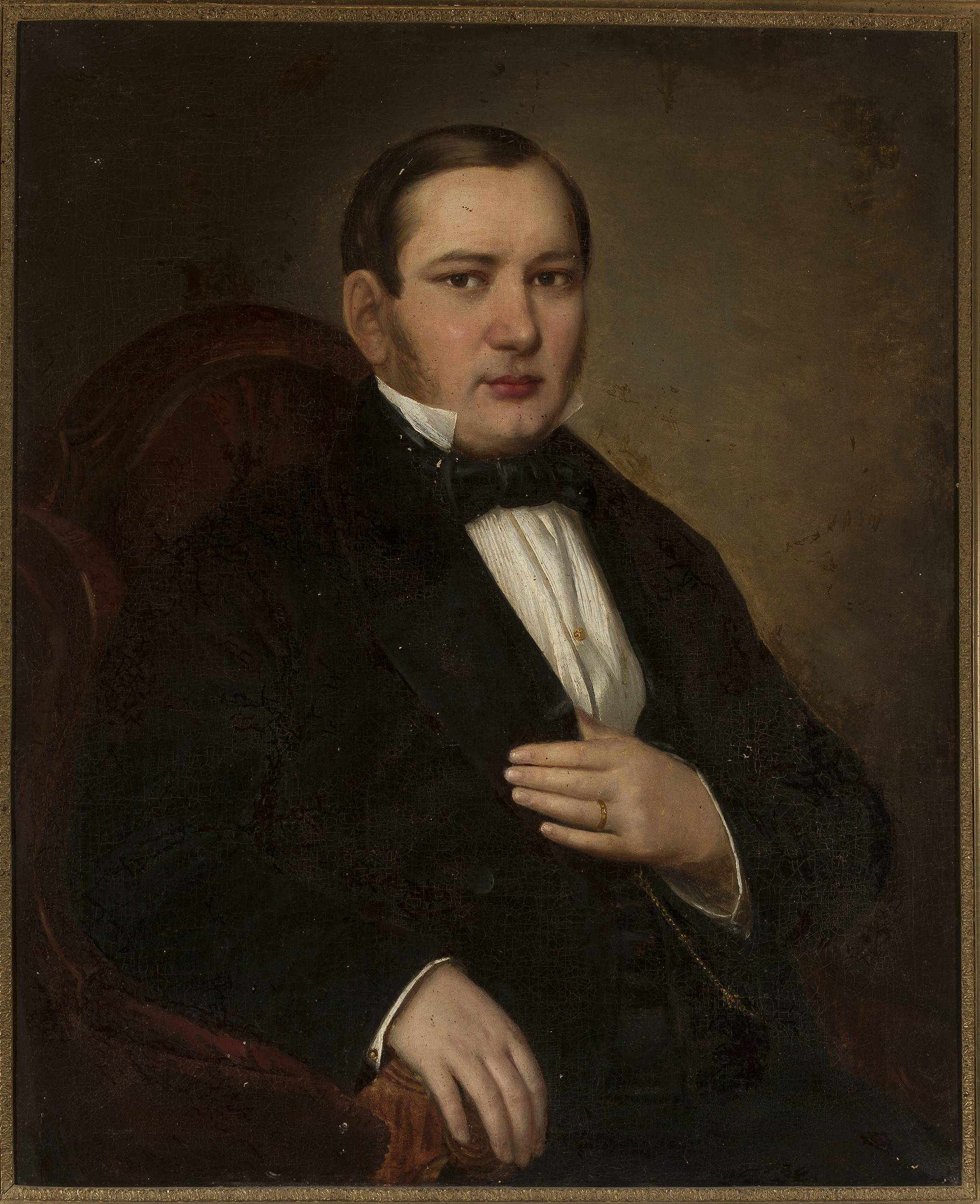
Mr. Lempke

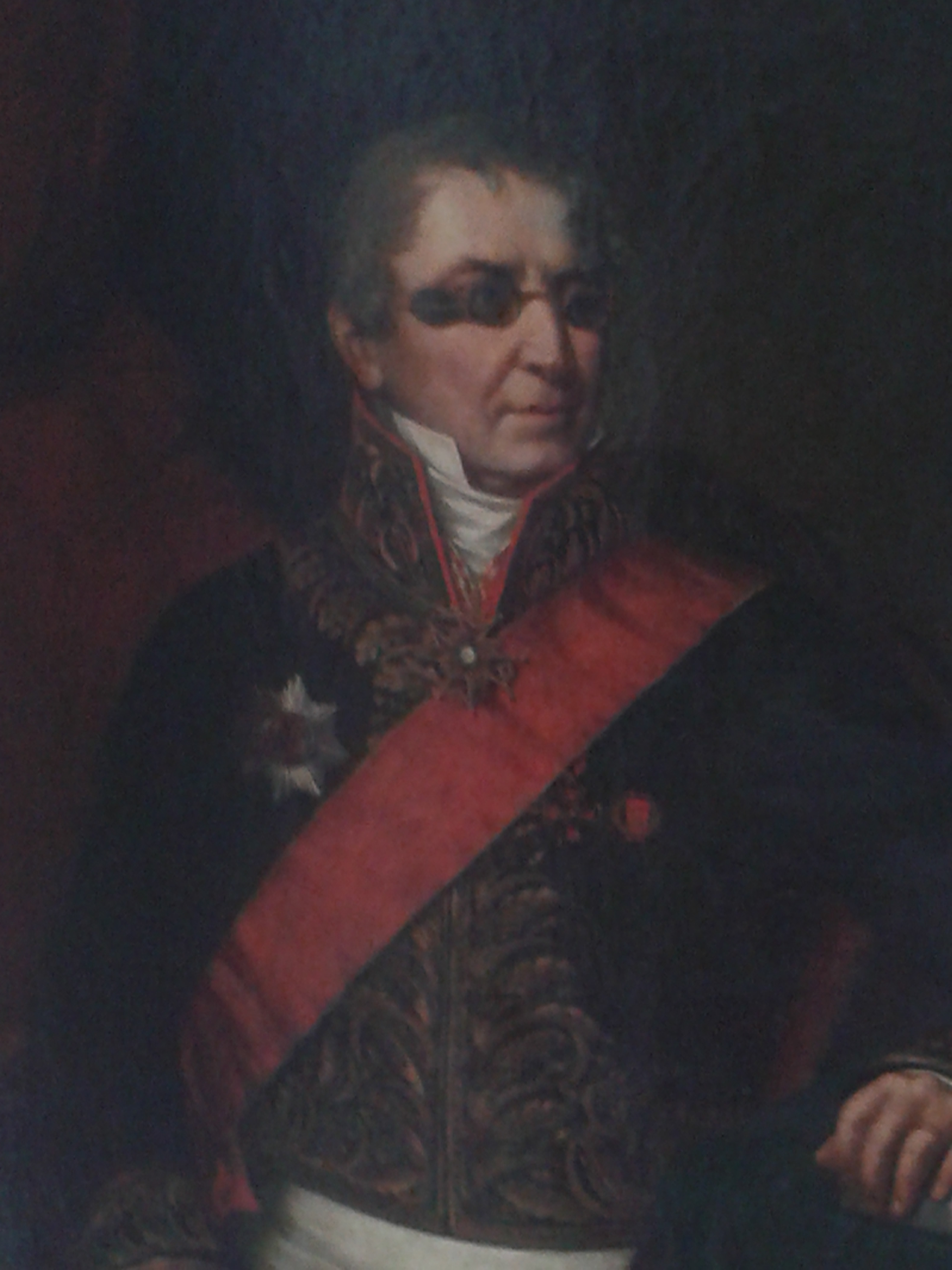
Mikołaj Wiorogórski

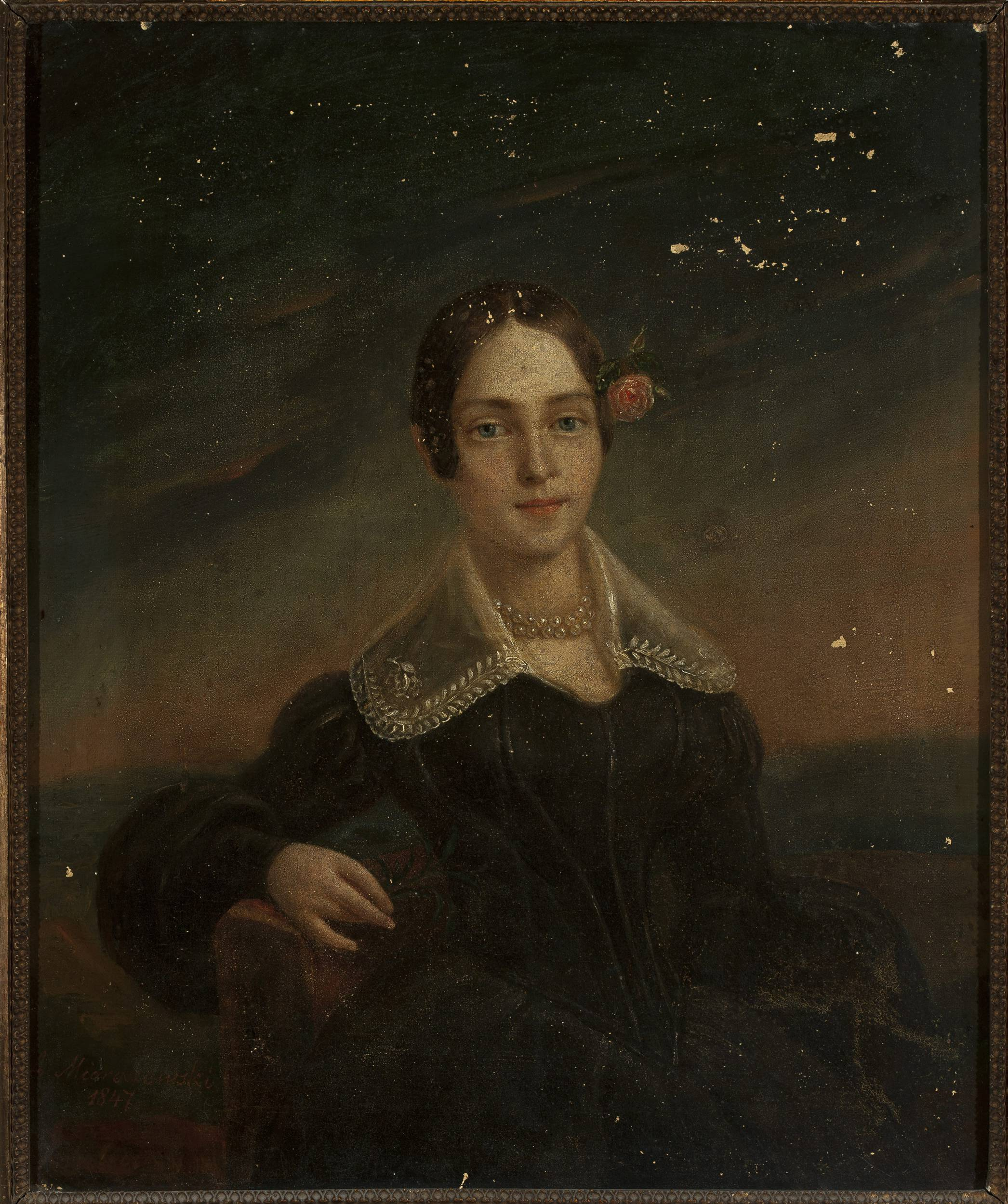
An unnamed young woman

== See also ==
- List of Poles
