= Barcikowo, Masovian Voivodeship =

Barcikowo
- Village
- Location within Poland
- Coordinates: 52°30′54″N 19°53′47″E
- Country: Poland
- Voivodeship: Masovian
- County: Płock
- Gmina: Słupno
- Population: 190

Barcikowo [bart͡ɕiˈkɔvɔ] is a village in the administrative district of Gmina Słupno, within Płock County, Masovian Voivodeship, in east-central Poland.
