= Kosino, Russia =

Kosino (Russian: Косино) is the name of several inhabited localities in Russia.

== Urban localities ==
- Kosino, Zuyevsky District, Kirov Oblast, an urban-type settlement in Zuyevsky District, Kirov Oblast

== Rural localities ==
- Kosino, Verkhoshizhemsky District, Kirov Oblast, a selo in Kosinsky Rural Okrug of Verkhoshizhemsky District of Kirov Oblast
- Kosino, Kostroma Oblast, a village in Baksheyevskoye Settlement of Kostromskoy District of Kostroma Oblast
- Kosino, Moscow Oblast, a village under the administrative jurisdiction of Domodedovo City Under Oblast Jurisdiction, Moscow Oblast
- Kosino, Novgorod Oblast, a village in Velikoselskoye Settlement of Starorussky District of Novgorod Oblast
- Kosino, Tver Oblast, a village in Bologovsky District of Tver Oblast
- Kosino, Babayevsky District, Vologda Oblast, a village in Toropovsky Selsoviet of Babayevsky District of Vologda Oblast
- Kosino, Kirillovsky District, Vologda Oblast, a settlement in Lipovsky Selsoviet of Kirillovsky District of Vologda Oblast
