= Miszewko Strzałkowskie =

- Village
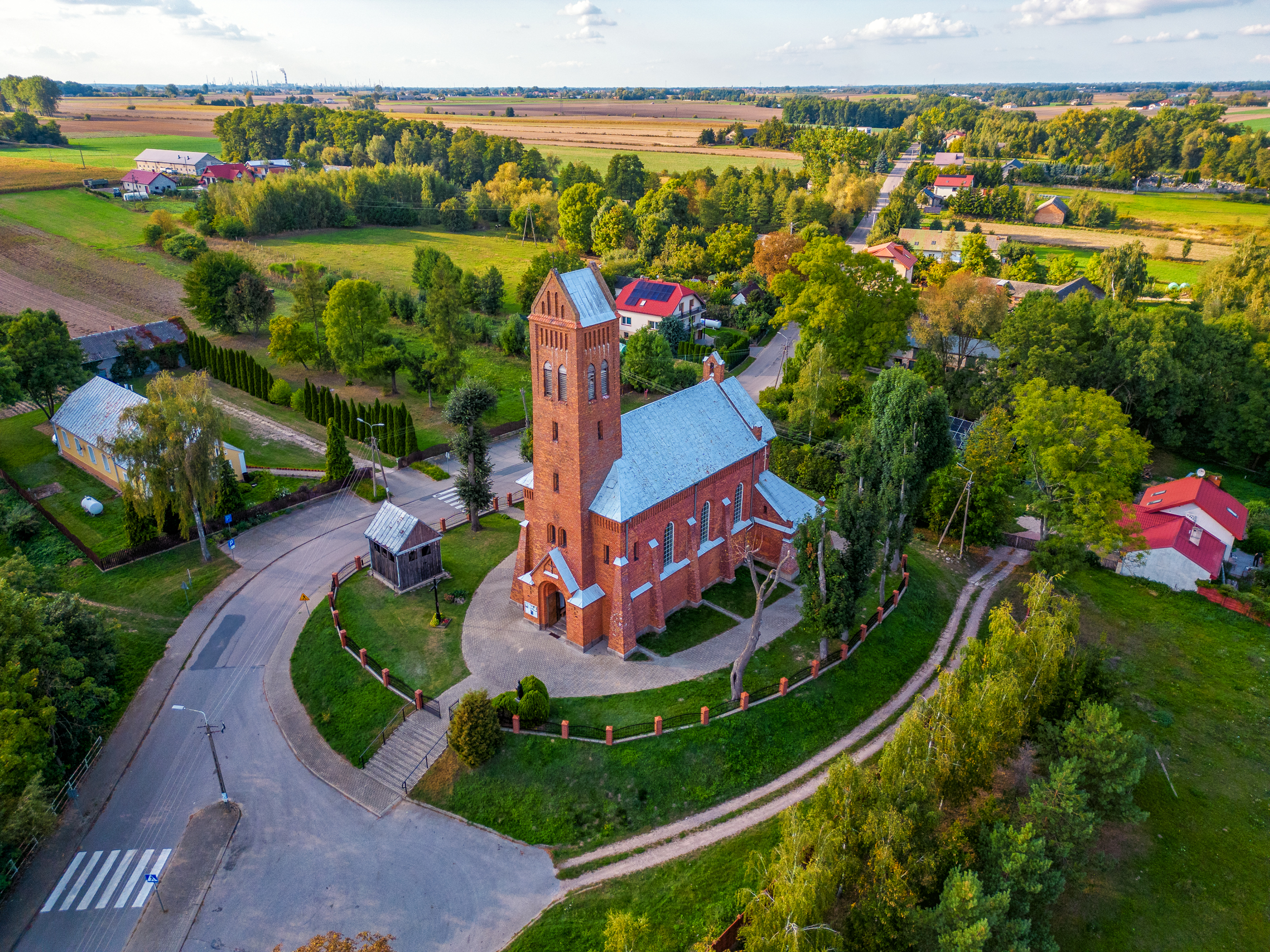

- Location within Poland
- Coordinates: 52°32′N 19°51′E
- Country: Poland
- Voivodeship: Masovian
- County: Płock
- Gmina: Słupno

Miszewko Strzałkowskie [miˈʂɛfkɔ stʂau̯ˈkɔfskʲɛ] is a village in the administrative district of Gmina Słupno, within Płock County, Masovian Voivodeship, in east-central Poland.
