= Kosino, Poland =

Kosino
- Village
- Location within Poland
- Coordinates: 52°33′N 19°56′E
- Country: Poland
- Voivodeship: Masovian
- County: Płock
- Gmina: Radzanowo

Kosino (pronounce [kɔˈɕinɔ]) is a village in the administrative district of Gmina Radzanowo, within Płock County, Masovian Voivodeship, in east-central Poland.

== Population ==
Kosino has a population is 331, 54.7% are woman and the rest are men. According to the Polish census of 2002, there were 110 household in the village, of which there were 27 farms inhabited by five or more people. Kosino has a much higher dependency ratio than Poland's average, with 75.1 people of non-working age for every 100 people of working age.
