= Bielino, Płock County =

Bielino
- Village
- Location within Poland
- Coordinates: 52°30′02″N 19°46′33″E
- Country: Poland
- Voivodeship: Masovian
- County: Płock
- Gmina: Słupno
- Population (2021): 274
- Time zone: UTC+1 (CET)
  - Summer (DST): UTC+2 (CEST)
- Postal code: 09-408
- Area code: +48 24

Bielino is a village in the Masovian Voivodeship, Poland, located within the Gmina Słupno, Płock County. Wirgnia forms part of the village.

== History ==
In the 16th century, Bielino was a village, privately owned by the members of the nobility.
