= Wojciech Żywny =

Wojciech Żywny Czech: Vojtěch Živný
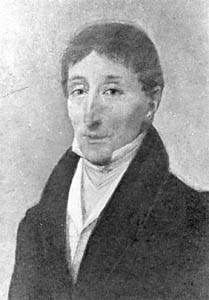
- Wojciech Żywny, by Ambroży Mieroszewski, 1829

Background information
- Born: Wojciech Adalbert Żywny; 13 May 1756; Mšeno, Bohemia
- Origin: Polish
- Died: 21 February 1842 (aged 85) Warsaw
- Occupations: Pianist, violinist, teacher, composer

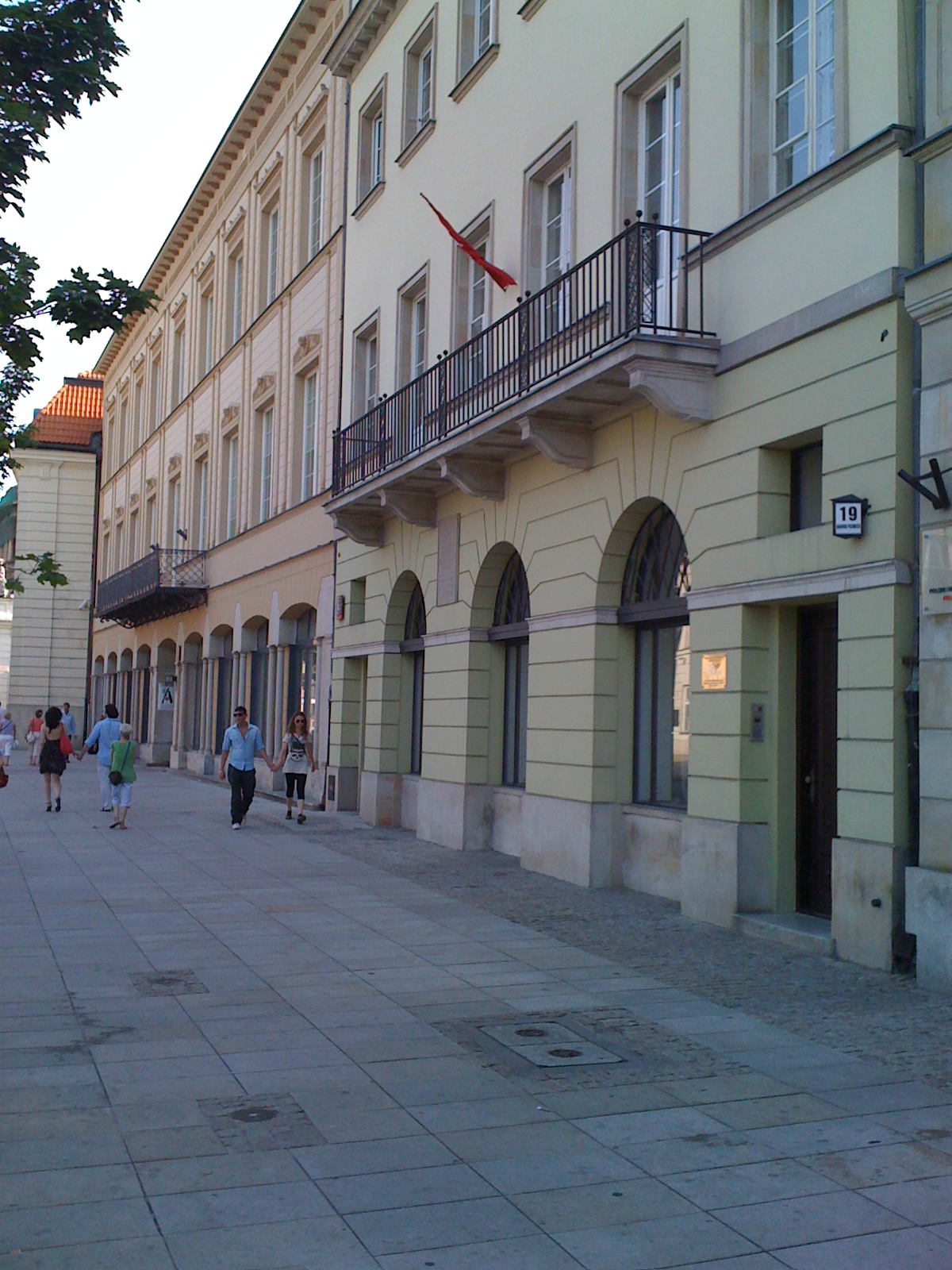
Krakowskie Przedmieście 19, Warsaw, Poland: site of Żywny's 1837-42 home

Wojciech Żywny (Czech: Vojtěch Živný; 13 May 1756 – 21 February 1842) was a Czech-born Polish pianist, violinist, teacher and composer. He was Frédéric Chopin's first professional piano teacher.

== Life ==
Żywny was born in Mšeno, Bohemia, and became a pupil of Jan Kuchař. As a youth, during the reign of Stanisław August Poniatowski, he moved to Poland to become the music tutor to the children of Princess Sapieha. He later moved to Warsaw.

He was the first professional piano teacher of Frédéric Chopin, who received lessons from him between 1816 and 1821. Żywny instilled in Chopin a lasting love of Bach, Haydn, Clementi and Mozart while avoiding contemporary composers like Beethoven and Weber. Chopin's piano skills soon surpassed those of his respected teacher. In 1821, eleven-year-old Chopin dedicated a Polonaise in A-flat major to Żywny as a name-day gift.

Żywny died in February 1842, aged 85, in Warsaw, Poland.

== Works ==
Żywny wrote many pieces for piano, and violin, as well as orchestral works, few of which are known or published today. They show refined mastery of the classical style, with definite romantic influences. Another influence on his music was Central European folk music.
