= Czerniewo, Masovian Voivodeship =

Czerniewo
- Village
- Location within Poland
- Coordinates: 52°36′N 19°57′E
- Country: Poland
- Voivodeship: Masovian
- County: Płock
- Gmina: Radzanowo

Czerniewo [t͡ʂɛrˈɲɛvɔ] is a village in the administrative district of Gmina Radzanowo, within Płock County, Masovian Voivodeship, in east-central Poland.
