= Catechism of Symon Budny =

1562 book by Symon Budny

Catechism
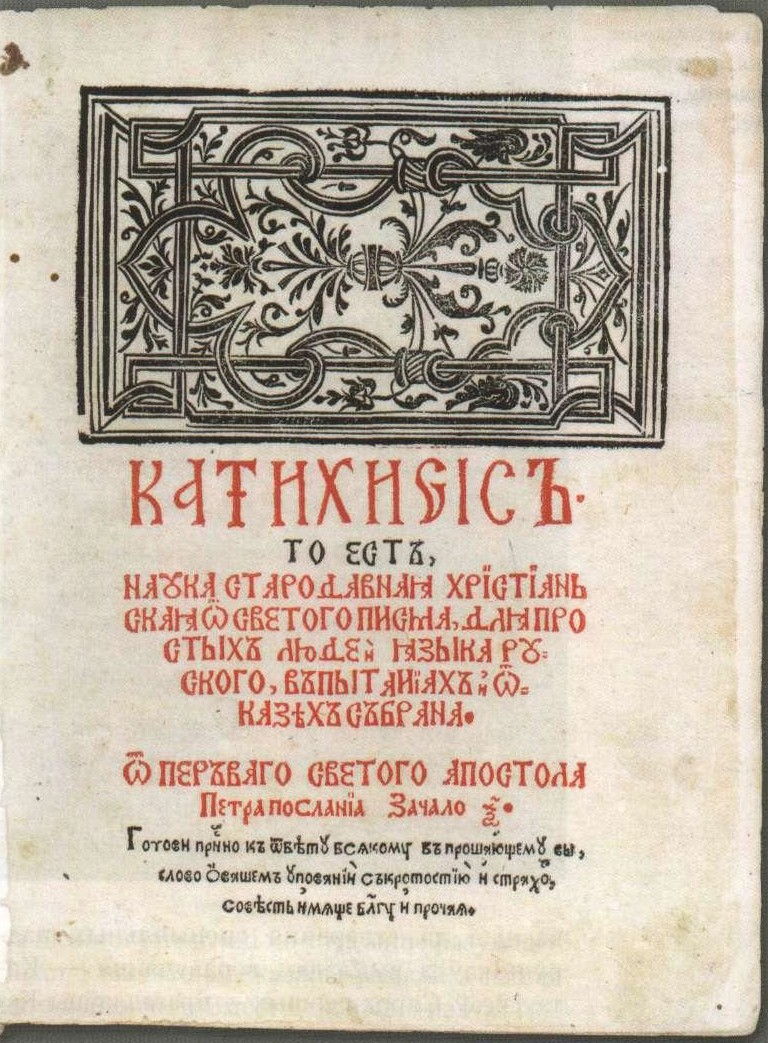
- Title page of the Catechism, printed in Nyasvizh in 1562. The inscription reads: "Katykhisis, that is, the ancient Christian teaching from the Holy Scripture, for common people of the Ruthenian tongue, gathered in questions and answers"
- Author: Symon Budny; Lawrence (Wawrzyniec) Krzyszkowski
- Original title: Катихисісъ
- Language: Old Belarusian
- Genre: Catechism
- Publisher: Nyasvizh printing house
- Publication date: 10 June 1562
- Publication place: Grand Duchy of Lithuania

The Catechism (Катихисісъ) is a book of short questions and answers on Christian themes, published on 10 June 1562 in the Nyasvizh printing house by the philosopher and figure of the Reformation movement Symon Budny and the Calvinist preacher Lawrence (Wawrzyniec) Krzyszkowski. It is the first book published within the territory of modern Belarus in the Old Belarusian language.

The Catechism was reprinted three times. The first time in Stockholm in 1628, and subsequent times in Minsk in 2005 and 2012. Until recently, libraries in Belarus did not possess a single copy of this book, and researchers could only study the work in the rare books department of the National Library via a photocopy.

== History ==
Symon Budny became fascinated with the idea of educating "common people" in 1560 while working as a preacher in Klyetsk. Together with the Nyasvizh preacher Maciej Kawęczyński, his brothers, and the Calvinist preacher Lawrence (Wawrzyniec) Krzyszkowski, Budny founded the Nyasvizh printing house. Financial assistance for its maintenance was provided by Mikołaj Radziwiłł the Black and the future Chancellor of Lithuania Ostafi Wołłowicz. On the latter's order, the fonts of Francysk Skaryna were brought from Vilna, which accelerated the appearance of the Catechism as early as June 1562.

== Description ==
=== Content ===
In his preface to the Catechism, Symon Budny notes that his book is published not only for educational purposes:

Сію книжку написахъ, абы... истинны разуменіа жаждущиі мели, чого бы ся и сами учили и деток своихъ научали

[I wrote this book so that... those thirsting for true understanding would have something to learn themselves and to teach their children]

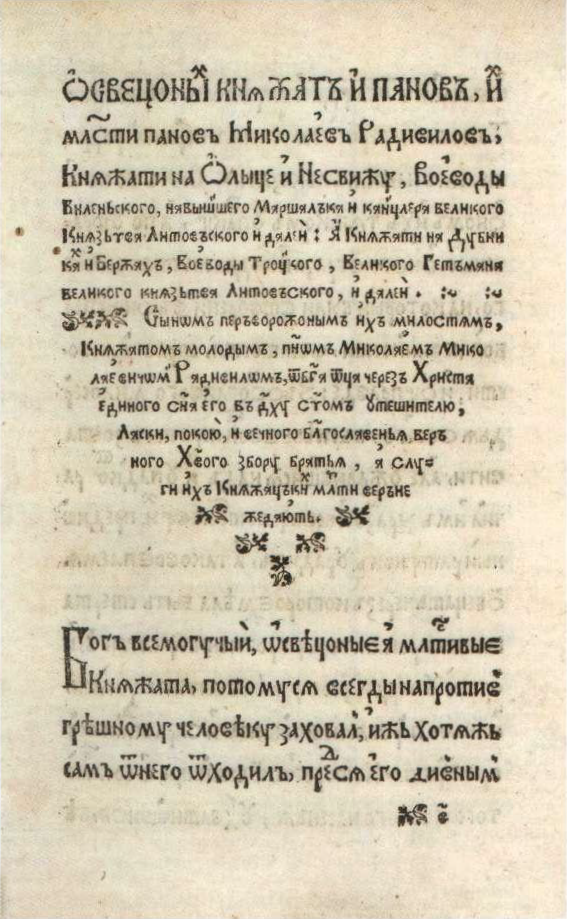
Dedication by the publishers Maciej Kawęczyński, Symon Budny, and Lawrence Krzyszkowski to their patrons: Mikołaj Radziwiłł, Voivode of Troki; Mikołaj Radziwiłł, Voivode of Vilna; and Mikołaj Radziwiłł, son of the latter.

Before the text, a dedication was typeset to Mikołaj Radziwiłł the Red, Voivode of Troki; Mikołaj Radziwiłł the Black, Voivode of Vilna; and Mikołaj Radziwiłł, the son of the latter. Following this was a preface written by Symon Budny on 10 June 1562 in Klyetsk. In the dedication, among other things, there is a recommendation to the Radziwiłłs to study the foundations of Christianity not only in foreign languages but also in their native Slavic language, to respect the contemporary Belarusian language, and to care for the development of culture, education, and book printing:

Абы ваши княжацкия милости не только в чужоземских языцех кохали, але бы ся теж... и того здавна славного языка славянского размиловати и оным ся бавити рачили. Слушная бо речь ест, абы ваши княжацкие милости того народу язык миловати рачили, в котором давъные предъки и их княжацкие милости панове отци ваших княжацких милости славне преднейшие преложеньства несуть

[So that your Princely Graces would not only love foreign languages but also... deign to love this long-glorious Slavic language and occupy yourselves with it. For it is a just thing that your Princely Graces should deign to love the language of that people, among whom your ancient ancestors and their Princely Graces, the fathers of your Princely Graces, held glorious and foremost positions.]

The writer-polemicist resolutely condemns the tendency in the Polish–Lithuanian Commonwealth to remove the "Ruthenian language" (Old Belarusian language) from use and replace it with Polish.

The preface, citing the Apostle and the Gospel, promotes the idea of the necessity of studying the foundations of faith, as one cannot save one's soul merely by performing church rituals and giving gifts to the clergy. Appropriate textbooks are needed, and the author of the preface offers readers a small book for now, hoping to prepare a more detailed edition in the future.

In addition to presenting specific provisions of Christian doctrine, the book raised issues relevant to that time, such as the civil duties of a person, attitudes towards public office, the right to own land, and the attitude of Christians towards wars, among others.

== Linguistic features ==
=== Phonetics ===
The Catechism became a model for using the ancient Belarusian language understandable to the common people. Folk speech is used here much more widely and consistently than in the editions of Francysk Skaryna. Despite the religious theme, the Catechism, according to Professor Leŭ Šakun, approaches the works of contemporary secular literature of Lithuania in its linguistic and stylistic features, which had already moved quite far from Church Slavonic bookishness.

Among the distinctive phonetic features of the Belarusian dialect, which Budny was one of the first to consciously reflect in his work, are:

Feature	Example
1) Transition of "u" (у) to non-syllabic "ŭ" (ў), which due to the lack of a special grapheme was rendered via "v" (в)	«вживати» (to use), «навчаніе» (teaching), «навчати» (to teach)
2) Hardening of sibilants	«божыи» (God's), «всемогучыи» (almighty), «иншыи» (other), «чужыи» (alien/other's), «маючы» (having), «содравшы» (having torn off)
3) In the Catechism, for the first time in Belarusian writing, parallel to the soft «-ть», the hard ending «тъ» is used in 3rd person singular and plural present tense verb forms	Compare: «маеть» (has), «мовить» (speaks), «пишеть» (writes), «стоить» (stands), «ведають» (they know), «терпеть» (they suffer) — «обецуетъ» (promises), «говорятъ» (they speak), «завидуютъ» (they envy), «живутъ» (they live), «могутъ» (they can)

=== Vocabulary ===
The vocabulary also presents significant linguistic distinctiveness. Its basis is proper Belarusian lexis, which includes both Common Slavic words that exist in the modern Belarusian language and numerous neologisms that arose on the basis of the independent existence of the Belarusian language.

Researcher of S. Budny's language, Academician Arkadź Žuraŭski, specifically notes the following features of the lexical composition of the Catechism:

Feature	Example
1) The Catechism contains a significant number of lexical Belarusisms, which were just beginning to consolidate in the literary usage of that time	«бачити» (to see), «взоръ» (pattern/example), «выховати» (to raise/nurture), «згинути» (to perish), «карати» (to punish), «краина» (country), «личьба» (digit/number), «мова» (language), «мовити» (to speak), «надея» (hope), «наставникъ» (teacher), «прикрий» (unpleasant/annoying), «пытанье» (question), «справа» (matter/case), «ховати» (to hide)
2) Budny uses the names of the days of the week in their Belarusian phonetic-morphological form:	«понѣдѣлокъ» (Monday), «второкъ» (Tuesday), «середа» (Wednesday), «четвѣеръ» (Thursday), «пятница» (Friday), «субота» (Saturday)
3) In the vocabulary of the Catechism, there are quite a few Polonisms, most of which are words that were not previously used in monuments, but later effectively consolidated in Belarusian writing:	«дочасный» (temporary), «жебровати» (to beg), «зычити» (to wish), «згола» (entirely/at all), «зацный» (noble/worthy), «маетность» (estate/property), «малженство» (marriage), «пришлый» (future), «цнота» (virtue), «члонок» (member/limb), «шкода» (damage/harm)
4) Symon Budny explained the meanings of incomprehensible words directly in the text (this method of explanation has been known since the late 15th century)	«брака или женитьбы» (marriage), «брань или валка» (war/battle), «елеомъ или маслом» (oil), «зелье або лекарство» (herb or medicine), «недуги або хворобы» (illnesses), «совесть або сумненне» (conscience or doubt), «татьми се есть злодѣеями» (thieves), «чада або молодые люди» (children or young people), etc. (Budny explained some words in the margins: «напасть — искушение» (misfortune — temptation), «стихія — початки» (element — beginnings), «чающе — ожидаючи» (expecting — waiting)

== Translations ==
In the early 1990s, a complete manuscript of the Nesvizh Catechism translated into the Russian language was found in the National Library of Russia (Saltykov-Shchedrin Library) in Saint Petersburg.

Researchers concluded that there were plans to republish this book in Petrine Russia in the early 18th century. The preparation of the edition is believed to have been led by one of Peter the Great's closest associates, the former rector of the Kyiv-Mohyla Academy, Theophan Prokopovich.

== Preserved copies ==
Currently, 11 preserved copies of the Catechism are known: one each in the Czartoryski Museum in Kraków and the Moscow State University Library; two each in the State Historical Museum (Moscow), Russian State Library (Moscow), and the National Library of the Czech Republic in Prague; and three in the National Library of Russia (St. Petersburg). Inscriptions on two of them confirm that these books circulated in Belarusian or Ukrainian lands.
