= Szydłowiecki =

Polish noble family

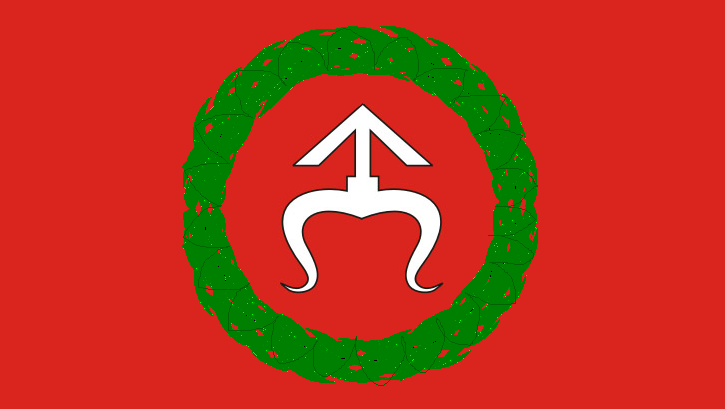
Banner of the family. The family coat of arms was Odrowąż.

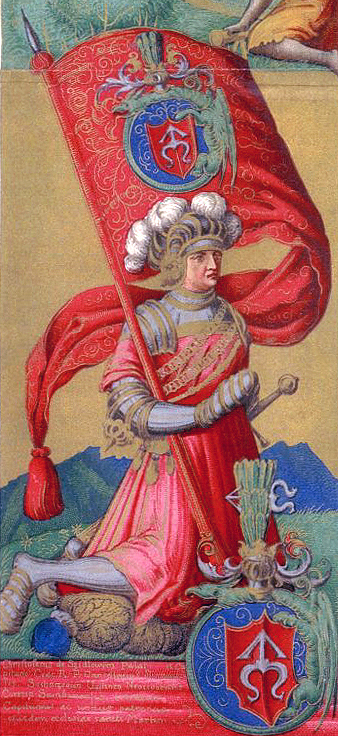
Great Chancellor of the Crown Krzysztof Szydłowiecki.

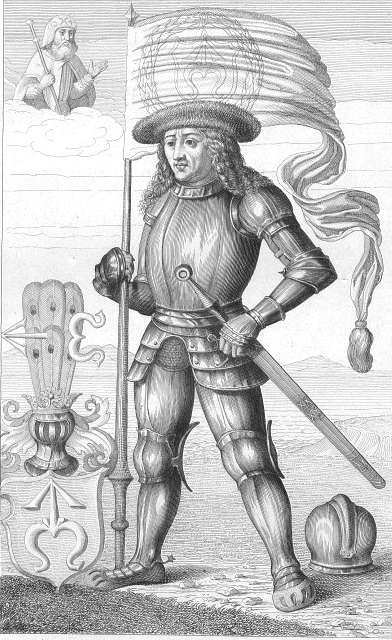
Grand Teasurer of the Crown Jakub Szydłowiecki.

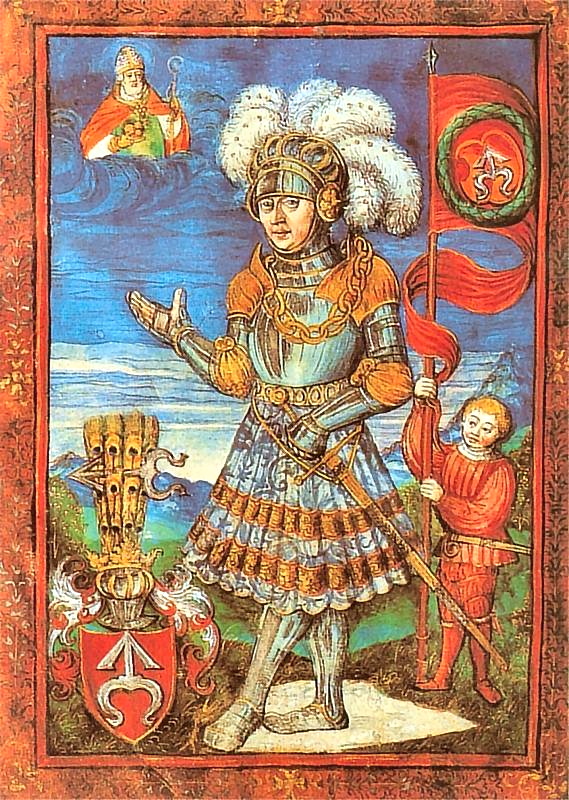
Grand Treasurer of the Crown Mikołaj Szydłowiecki.

The Szydłowiecki (plural: Szydłowieccy, feminine form: Szydłowiecka) was a Polish szlachta (nobility) family. A branch of the House of Odrowąż. Magnates in the Kingdom of Poland and the First Republic of Poland.

Their family nest was Szydłowiec at the Korzeniówka river near Radom in Masovia.

== Notable members ==
- Elżbieta Szydłowiecka
- Jakub Szydłowiecki
- Krzysztof Szydłowiecki
- Mikołaj Szydłowiecki

== Coat of arms ==
The Szydłowiecki family used the Odrowąż coat of arms.

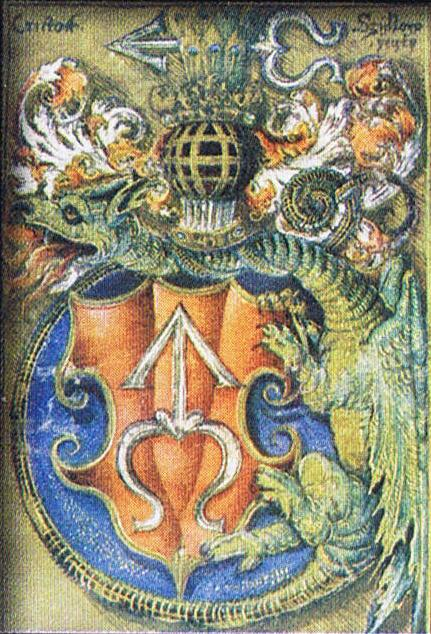
Coat of arms of Chancellor Krzysztof Szydłowiecki

== Genealogical tree ==
Odrowąż
Jakub Szydłowiecki •Anna Jastrzębcówna	Małgorzata Odrowążówna	Sławko Szydłowiecki
Mikołaj	Piotr	Stanisław •1.NN Adwańcówna •2.Zofia Łabędziówna	Barbara	8 NN daughters
Katarzyna	Jan	Jakub •Zofia Półkozicówna	2 Krzysztof •Zofia Targowicczanka	2 Piotr •Barbara Krupianka	2 Paweł	2 Anna	2 Mikołaj •Anna Tęczyńska	2 Barbara	2 Marcin	2 Elżbieta	2 NN daughter
Barbara	Zofia	Zofia	Krystyna	Elżbieta •Mikołaj Radziwiłł Czarny	Ludwik	Zygmunt	NN son	NN son	NN daughter	NN son	NN son

== Bibliography ==
- Stefan Rosiński (red.): Mikołaj i Krzysztof Szydłowieccy - patroni turnieju rycerskiego. Szydłowiec: Muzeum Ludowych Instrumentów Muzycznych, 2006.
