= Andreyuk =

Andreyuk is a surname. Notable people with the surname include:

- Alexei Andreyuk (born 1959), Belarusian architect
- Vyacheslav Andreyuk (1945–2010), Soviet footballer
- Yelena Andreyuk (born 1958), Soviet volleyball player
