= Nyasvizh printing house (16th century) =

16th-century printing house in Nyasvizh

- Нясвіжская друкарня
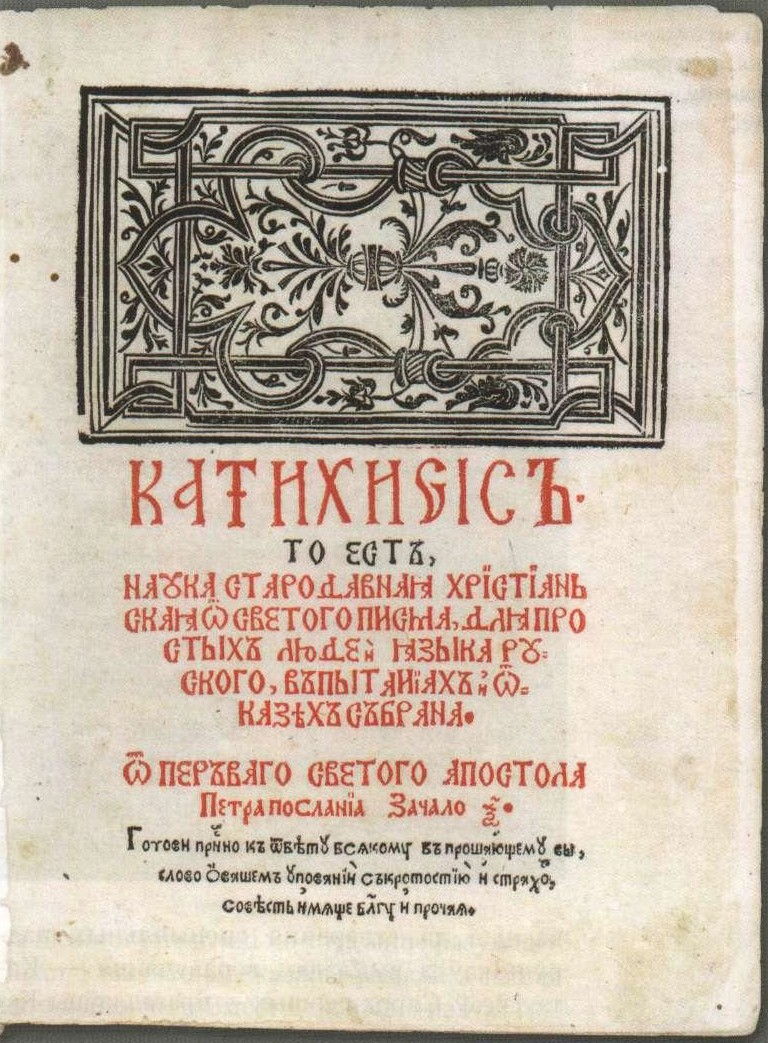
- Title page of Symon Budny's Catechism, printed in Nyasvizh in 1562
- Founded: 1562
- Founders: Maciej Kawęczyński; Mikołaj Radziwiłł the Black
- Defunct: 1572 (moved to Losk)
- Type: Printing house
- Location: Nyasvizh, Grand Duchy of Lithuania
- Products: Books
- Key people: Symon Budny; Laŭren Kryškoŭski; Daniel Lenczycki

The Nyasvizh printing house (Нясвіжская друкарня) was a printing press in Nyasvizh (now in Belarus) that operated in the 16th century. It played an important role in the development of Belarusian book printing and the dissemination of the ideas of the Reformation.

== History ==
The first printing house in Nyasvizh belonged to the Nyasvizh administrator (econom), a graduate of the University of Wittenberg, Maciej Kawęczyński (c. 1520–1572). Through his efforts and those of the Nyasvizh preacher Lawrence (Wawrzyniec) Krzyszkowski, book printing was organized in 1562. The printing house was founded under the patronage of the owner of Nyasvizh, a Protestant and the founder of the Brest printing house, Mikołaj Radziwiłł the Black.

The ideological leader in the first years of its existence was the Klyetsk preacher Symon Budny. It was the first printing house in the territory of Belarus to use Cyrillic fonts. The name of the printer of the Cyrillic editions is unknown.

The first book printed in Nyasvizh, published in 1562, was the Cyrillic Catechism (Катихисис то ест наука стародавная христианъская от светого писма для простых людей языка руского, в пытаниах и отказех събрана; Catechism, that is, the ancient Christian teaching from the Holy Scripture for common people of the Ruthenian tongue, gathered in questions and answers), the first book published within the territory of modern Belarus in the Old Belarusian language. It was written by Budny based on Martin Luther's Large Catechism (1529). The next publication of the printing house was also a Cyrillic book – Symon Budny's work On the Justification of the Sinful Man before God (Про оправдание грешного человека пред Богом), published on 11 October 1562 (not preserved). The work was dedicated to Ostafi Wołłowicz, the Land Treasurer of Lithuania, who invested his funds in the Nyasvizh printing house: "...the beginning of this printing house of ours was prepared and strengthened from the very start by the contributions of your Grace, as a certain foundation," wrote Budny in the dedication. It is evident that the Land Treasurer either did not want to or could not place a Protestant printing house in the capital, Vilnius.

At the end of 1562, the printer Daniel Lenczycki began working at the printing house. Probably, the new craftsman knew neither the Ruthenian (Old Belarusian) nor the Church Slavonic languages – after his arrival and until the printing house ceased operations, no more Cyrillic books were published there. However, there may be another explanation. By starting the publication of Cyrillic books in the Old Belarusian language, Symon Budny wanted to increase the number of his supporters among the Orthodox population of the Grand Duchy of Lithuania. However, he met sharp resistance, particularly from the starets Artemy, who lived at the court of the Slutsk prince Yury II Olelkovich. Budny wrote to the Swiss theologian Heinrich Bullinger about the results of the polemics: "Your... arguments are being shattered."

It is quite possible that the Protestants abandoned printing their works in Cyrillic not so much due to the lack of trained printers and preachers, but for tactical reasons – so as not to wage a "war on two fronts." They focused on anti-Catholic propaganda, which was more convenient to do in Latin and Polish. This laid the foundation for the tradition of cooperation between the Orthodox and Protestants in the GDL.

The period of the greatest publishing activity of the first Nyasvizh printing house falls on 1563–1564, with eight titles. In 1563, Symon Budny's Catechism was published in Polish, and the following year, 1564, Conversations of Saint Justin the Philosopher and Martyr with Trypho the Jew in the translation of the same S. Budny. Like the Brest printing house, the Nyasvizh press released three books by Paweł z Brzezin in 1564: Differences in the Faith of Stancaro's Disciples, A Brief Description of the Events that Took Place in 1563 in Kraków and Pińczów, and Against the Articles of the New Faith Expressed by Sarnicki in Warsaw.

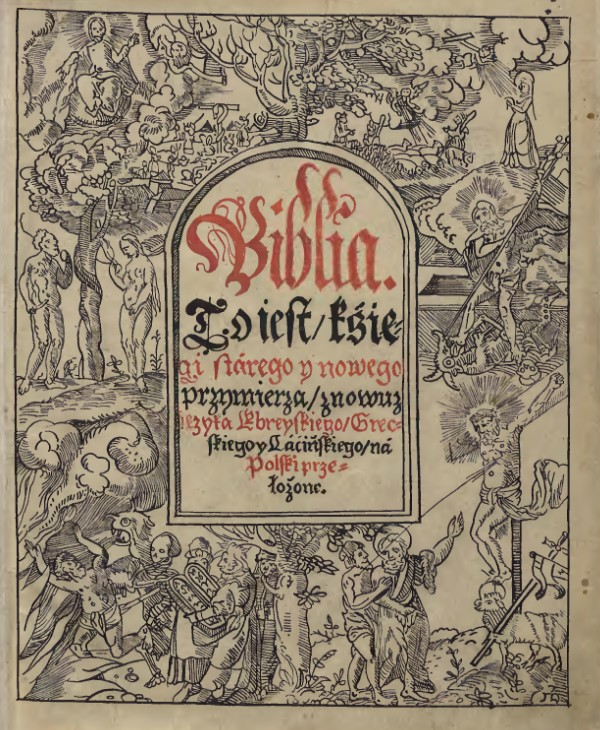
Title page of the Nyasvizh Bible translated by Symon Budny. 1570–1572

Then there was a break until 1568, when the New Testament in S. Budny's translation was republished. Two editions were released in 1570 – Apocrypha and the New Testament. In 1572, the printing of a new translation of the Old Testament began. In the preface, Symon Budny wrote about the language of his translation: "You will find here Greater Polish words, you will find Cracovian, Mazovian, Podlachian, Sandomierzian, and a few Ruthenian ones. For it is foolishness to despise the language of one country and extol the words of another to the heavens."

However, by that time, Mikołaj Radziwiłł the Orphan, who professed Catholicism, had already become the owner of Nyasvizh. He actively hindered the activities of Protestants; there is a legend that "the Orphan" bought up copies of the Brest printing house's editions and burned them in the courtyard of the Nyasvizh Castle. It was impossible for Symon Budny to work under such conditions. Then the printing house was bought by the Protestant magnate Jan Kiszka – it was moved to Losk, where the printing of the Old Testament was completed. According to other sources, the Bible was finished in 1572 in Zaslawye or in the Kawęczyński estate in Uzda.

== Artistic features ==
Most books of the Nyasvizh printing house had a simple design without illustrations. Type ornaments, various fonts, and initials with a decorative floral background were used. In the artistic decoration of Cyrillic books, connections with the traditions of Francysk Skaryna can be clearly traced.
