= Kokociński =

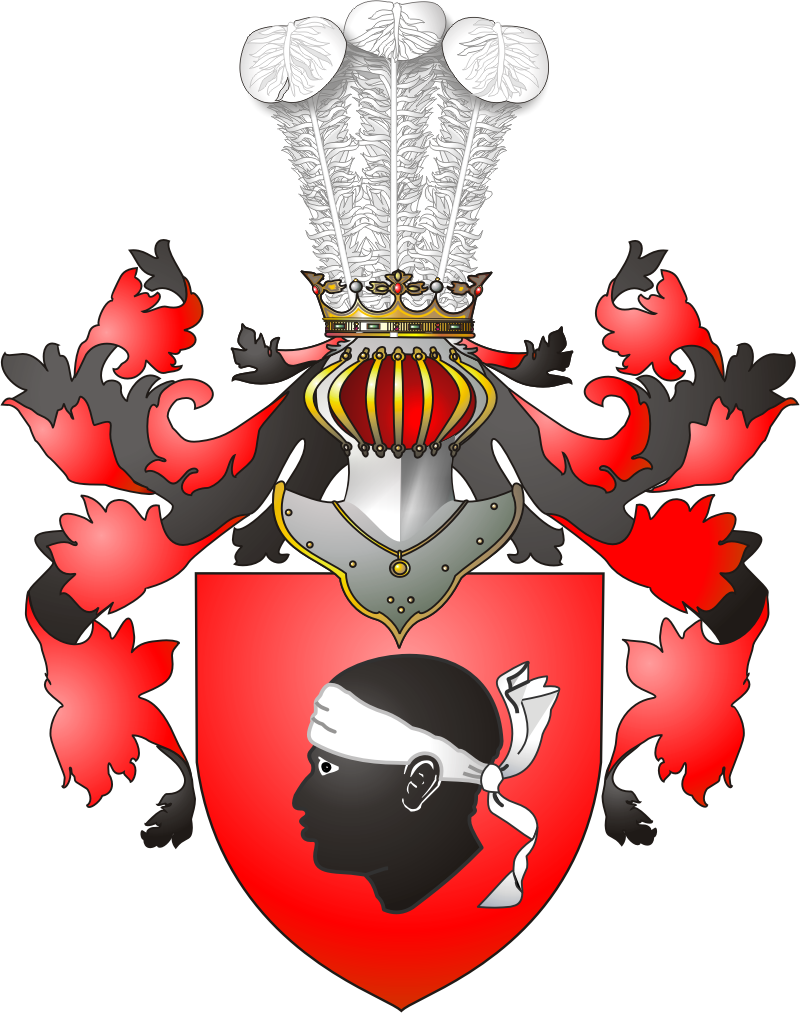
Mora coat of arms used by some of Kokociński family

Kokociński or Kokocinski (female: Kokocińska, Kokocinska) is a Polish surname. Some of them use Mora coat of arms. Notable people with the surname include:

- Alessandro Kokocinski (1948–2017), Italian-Argentine painter, sculptor, and set designer of Polish-Russian origin
- Daniel Kokosiński (born 1985), Polish football coach and player
- Katarzyna Kokocińska (born 1973), Polish lawyer, professor in commercial law and public law
- Licia Kokocinski (born 1951), Australian politician
- Michael Kokocinski (born 1985), German footballer
- Malcolm Kokocinski (born 1991), Swedish golfer
- Otylia Kokocińska (1923–2022), Polish teacher and activist, member of the Sejm
