= Millennium Monument of Brest =

Brest Millennium Monument
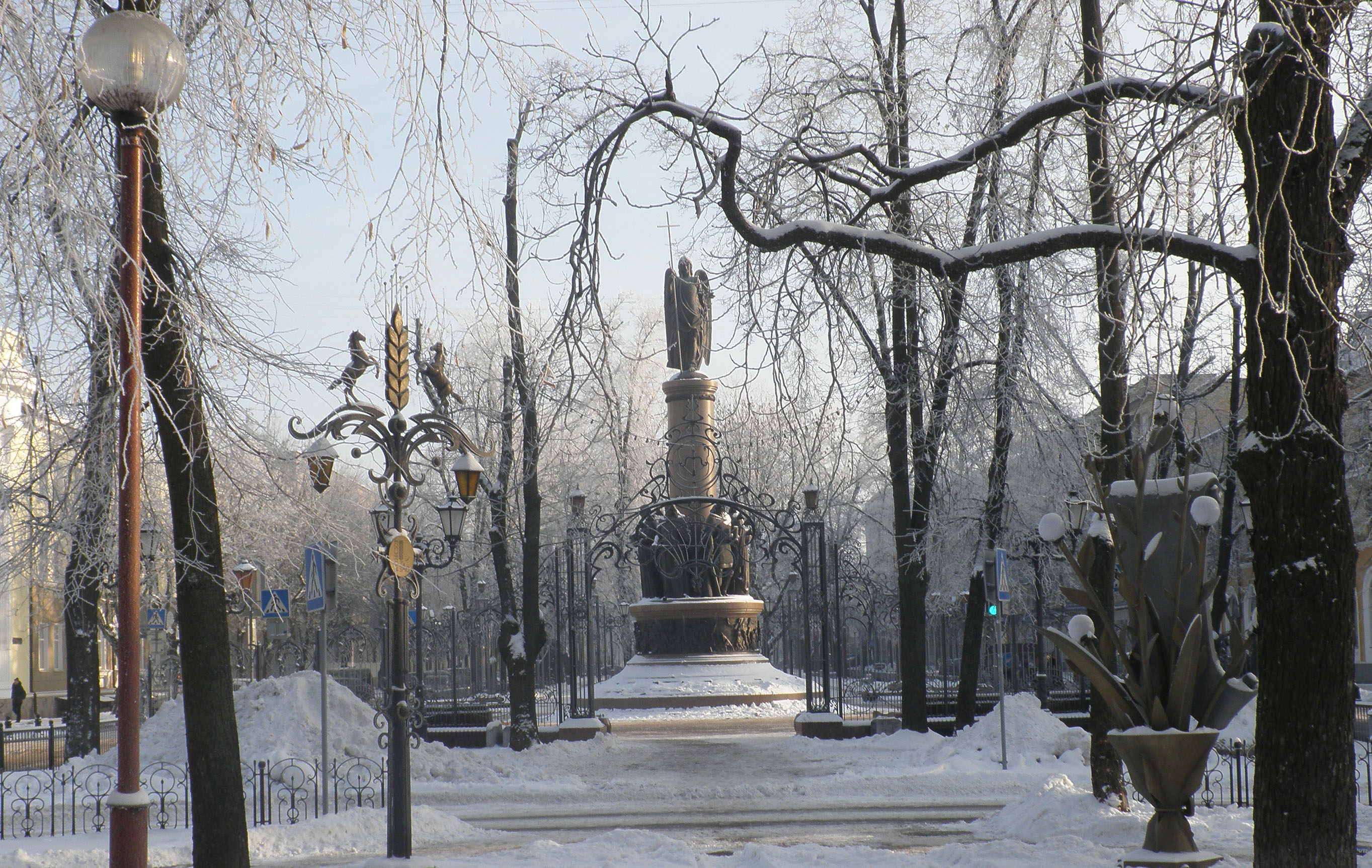
- Interactive map of Brest Millennium Monument
- Location: Brest, Belarus
- Coordinates: 52.0927°N 23.6931°E
- Designer: Alexei Andreyuk and Alexei Pavluchuk
- Material: granite and bronze
- Height: 15.1 metres (50 ft)
- Beginning date: 2009
- Completion date: 2011
- Opening date: July 2009
- Dedicated to: Millennium of the city

Brest Millennium Monument (Belarusian: Помнік Тысячагоддзя Брэста, romanized: Pomnik Tysiačahoddzia Bresta) was designed by the Belarusian architect Alexei Andreyuk and sculptor Alexei Pavluchuk to commemorate the millennium of Brest, Belarus. It was erected in 2009 at the intersection of Sovietskaya Street and Gogol Street in Brest. The project was financed by the state budget and public donations.

The monument presents a group of bronze statues. The angel of mercy with a cross is standing at the top of a granite column. 3 statues remember the remarkable historic personalities that are associated with Brest: Vladimir Vasilkovich, who put up a tower in the castle of the town in the 13th century, Vytautas the grand duke of Grand Duchy of Lithuania, Mikołaj "the Black" Radziwiłł in whose printing shop the first Belarusian book was printed, 3 more statues represent abstract images: warrior, mother, chronicler (who wrote apparently the Primary Chronicle). The total height is 15.1 m, the height of the angel is 3.8 m, the height of the 6 statues is 3 m. the diameter of the base is 8.6 m. In April 2011 a belt of high reliefs appeared around the monument. It depicts history-making episodes of Brest.
