= Stanisław Radziwiłł =

Lithuanian noble (1559–1599)

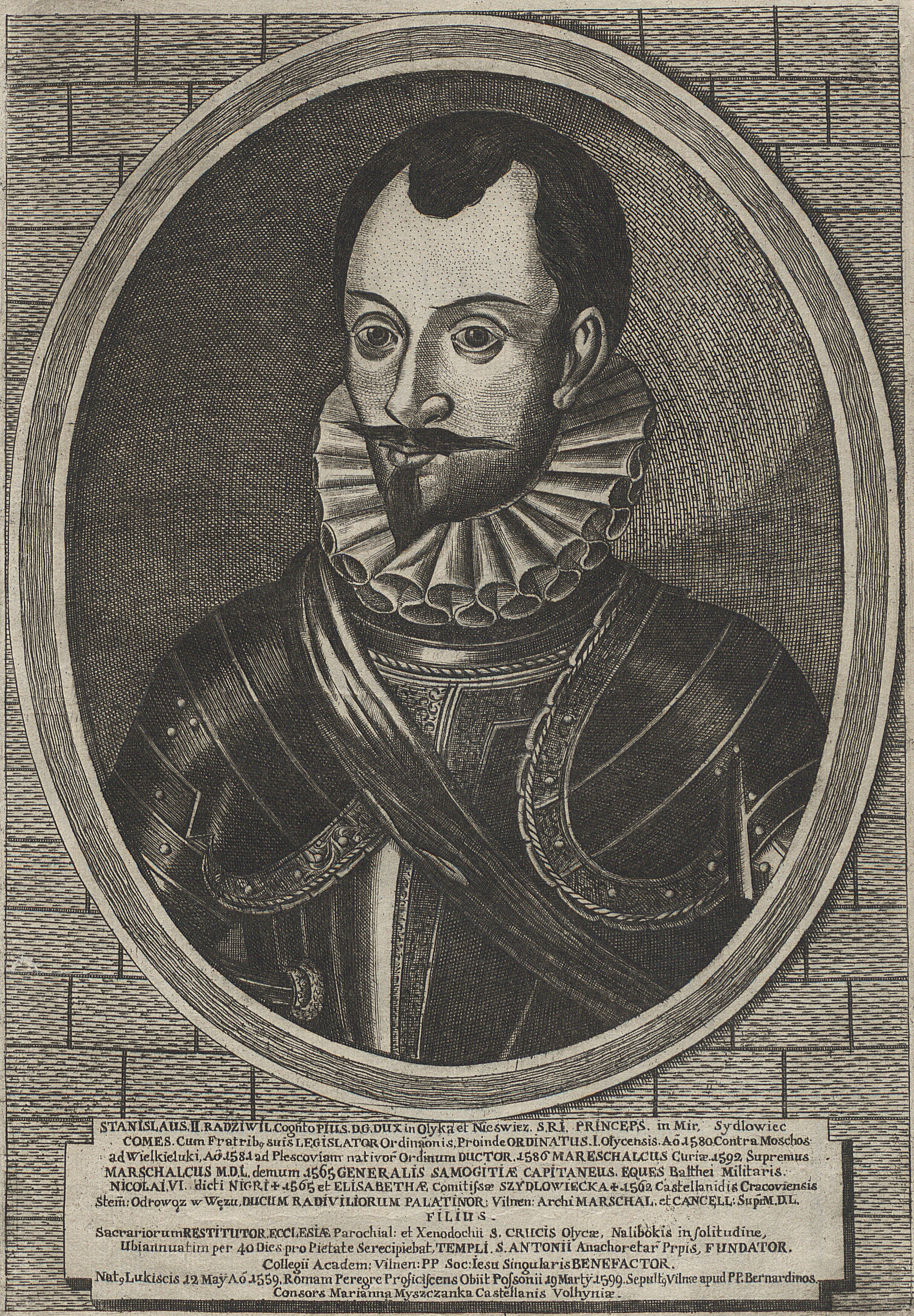
- Born: 12 May 1559; Vilnius
- Died: 19 March 1599 (aged 39); Pasawa
- Resting place: Church of St. Francis and St. Bernardino, Vilnius
- Parent(s): Mikołaj "the Black" Radziwiłł; Elżbieta Szydłowiecka

See also Stanisław Albrecht Radziwiłł.

Stanisław "the Pious" Radziwiłł (Lithuanian: Stanislovas Radvila II; 12 May 1559 – 19 March 1599) was a sixth-generation Radziwill family noble (szlachcic) of the Grand Duchy of Lithuania in the Polish–Lithuanian Commonwealth. He was an Elder of Samogitia (1595 until his death in 1599), a first ordynat of Olyka, and the Great Lithuanian Marshal (from 1592 until his death).

== Life ==
He was the son of Mikołaj "the Black" Radziwiłł and Elżbieta Szydłowiecka. Raised as a Calvinist, he converted to Roman Catholicism and was known as a very pious person, which gained him the nickname Pobożny (Pious). He was also known for his scholarly interests - he collected books and could read in many languages. He avoided politics but fought in the wars with Muscovy under the Polish king Stefan Batory. He built most of the Olyka Castle.

Stanislaw was a thoroughly educated person and knew several foreign languages. He translated from Greek into Polish part of the work of the Patriarch of Constantinople Gennadius Scholarius, containing commentaries on the five articles of the Florentine Union, which was published in 1586. He was the author of a work on the main truths of the faith entitled Oręże duchowne prawowitego rycerza chrześcijańskiego (lit. 'The Spiritual Arms of the Rightful Christian Knight'), published in Kraków in 1591. Immediately after becoming the Elder of Samogitia, he wrote to his brother Mikołaj Krzysztof Radzwiłł: "While learning various languages, I forgot Lithuanian, and now I see, I have to go to school again, because that language, as I see, God willing, will be needed." This was because the Lithuanian language remained dominant in Samogitia, unlike in certain other areas of the Grand Duchy of Lithuania.

== Sources ==
- Chowańska, Emilia (2012). "Testament Stanisława Radziwiłła, księcia na Ołyce i Nieświeżu, starosty generalnego żmudzkiego z 8 września 1598 roku, znajdujący się w zbiorach Archiwum Głównego Akt Dawnych w Warszawie" (PDF). Białostockie Teki Historyczne. 10.
- Drungila, Jonas (2019). Erelis lokio guolyje (in Lithuanian).
- Margaret Odrowaz-Sypniewska, The Radziwill Dynasty: From Pagan Times to the 1960s - Part One, https://www.angelfire.com/mi4/polcrt/radziwill.html
