= Odrowąż coat of arms =

Polish coat of arms

Odrowąż
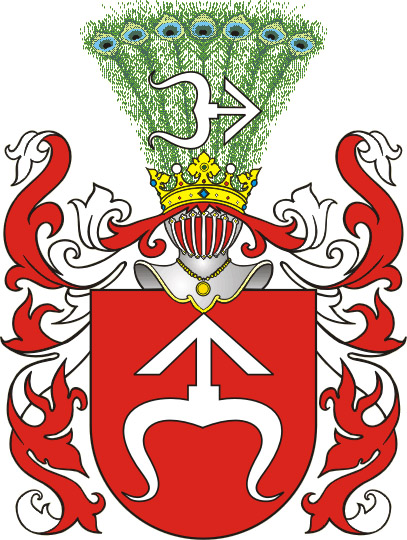
- Battle cry: Odrowąż
- Alternative names: Odrzywąs, Odrovons, Odrowonz
- Earliest mention: 1350 (seal)
- Cities: Szydłowiec, Opoczno, Ozorków, Sędziszów Małopolski
- Gminas: Gmina Iwanowice, Gmina Nowy Targ
- Families: 363 names A Abratowicz, Ambroch, Aramowicz, Augustynowicz. B Baftałowski, Baranowski, Bębnowski, Białaczewicz, Białaczewski, Białaczowski, Białeczewicz, Bielawski, Bilicz, Blaszkowski, Bleżowski, Błaszkowicki, Błaszkowicz, Błaszkowiecki, Błażejewicz, Błażejewski, Błażejowicz, Błażejowski, Błażyjewski, Bobrownicki, Bogorajski, Boguszewicz, Bohuryński, Bohuszewicz, Brachowski, Brózdowski, Buchta, Buczkowski, Burchacki, Burkacki, Bylina. C Cedroński, Cedrowski, Chancłowicz, Chaustowicz, Chlewicki, Chociaszewski, Chociszewski, Chodecki, Cholticz, Chomiński, Chomski, Chreptowicz, Chwałkowski, Ciński, Ciżewski, Ciżowski, Cyński, Czechowski, Czelo, Czykiński, Czykliński. D Dąbieński, Dembiński, Dębieński, Dębiński, Domański, Dowojnowicz, Duracz, Durasiewicz, Durasowicz, Duraszewicz, Duroszewicz, Dziewiatyński, Dziewiątl. E Egrodzyński, Endwiłł. F Falconie, Falk, Falkonis, Falkoński, Ferber, Forst, Forsth, Funger. G Gałka, Gedmin, Getowc, Giedmin, Gietowć, Gietowt, Giwanowski, Gliszczyński, Glwanowski, Głębocki, Głogowski, Godowski, Godulski, Godwojsz, Gorski, Goslęcki, Goslędzki, Gostowicki, Gostwicki, Gostyński, Goświcki, Górski, Grabowski, Gradowski, Graliński, Greczyński, Gudowicz, Gulbiński. H Hanel, Hudowicz. I Iwanowski. J Jacewicz, Jachnowicz, Jachnowski, Jachowski, Jacynicz, Jaczynic, Jaczynicz, Jaczyński, Janczycki, Jarczyński, Jaskółka, Jączyński, Jędwiłł, Jucewicz, Juchnowski, Jura. K Kamieński, Kamiński, Kapusta, Kapustyński, Kapuściński, Karsznicki, Karśnicki, Kiełpsz, Kietliński, Kisarzewski, Kissarzewski, Kniaski, Kniźski, Knyszyński, Konczewski, Konecki, Konicki, Koniecki, Konkowski, Kontski, Kończewski, Koński, Korzeniewicz, Kościelnicki, Kościukiewicz, Kotuliński, Kowalewski, Krajewski, Krawarski, Krobski, Kruszlowski, Krużlowski, Kryszkowski, Krzyczkowski, Krzyskowski, Krzyszkowski, Krzyszyłowski, Krzyszytowski, Krzyżkowski, Kuliński, Kurasiński, Kurzański, Kuszel, Kuszelewski, Kwinta, Kwinto. L Lasota, Lassota, Ledrowski, Lewiecki, Lisowski, Litawor. Ł Łaniewski, Łankowski, Łucki, Łukaszewicz, Łukaszewski. M Malechowski, Malicki, Małuj, Małuja, Manczyk, Maniewski, Manujłowicz, Mańczukowski, Markiewicz, Maskiewicz, Maszycki, Mażejko, Mieczkowski, Mielicki, Mieszkowski, Mięszkowski, Miklasz, Mikłasz, Milżecki, Milżewski, Milżycki, Miłosław, Miłżecki, Mimonrzecki, Mimoński, Mina, Minakowski, Minkiewicz, Minkowicz, Minkowski, Minoski, Minowski, Mińkowski, Mironicki, Mironiski, Miroński, Miroszewski, Mirski, Mleczko, Mniewski, Mniowski, Morgiewicz, Morkiewicz, Możejko, Mroczko. N Nieświeński, Nieświński, Niświeński, Niwiński. O Obrębski, Obulec, Obulecz, Ochramowicz, Ochrymowicz, Odrowąż, Olsztyński, Ossowski, Otorowski. P Pacanowski, Paczanowski, Parczewski, Parczowski, Pawłowicz, Pekulicki, Petrykowski, Pękalski, Piekalicki, Pieniążek, Pietkiewicz, Pikturn, Pikturna, Pikturno, Piramowicz, Pleśniewicz, Pleżniewicz, Płatkowski, Płoszowski, Płotnicki, Pniewski, Pniowski, Podgórski, Połęcki, Pontus, Pontusowicz, Potempski, Potemski, Potępski, Potrakowski, Potrykowski, Potrzykowski, Prandota, Proszowski, Pruskowski, Pruszkowski, Przedwojewski, Przedworski, Przydworski, Ptaszyński, Putel, Putell. R Racławski, Raszkowski, Rembieszycki, Rodziszewski, Roskowski, Rozdrażewski. S Sąd, Sczekocki, Sedlnicki, Siedlecki, Siemaszko, Siemaszkowicz, Siemieszki, Siemieszko, Siński-Czykiński, Sipniewski, Skorzewski, Skowrocki, Skórzewski, Sławęcki, Spannbauer, Sprowski, Starewicz, Strasz, Straszewicz, Strusz, Stuliński, Stużeński, Stużyński, Sypniewski, Sypniowski, Sypnowski, Szczekocki, Szpikłowski, Szukiewicz, Szydłowiecki. T Torczyłło, Tworkowski. U Usarzewski. W Waligórski, Walmont, Walmontowicz, Waniewski, Wanikowski, Wazgird, Wądołowski, Wątróbka, Werda, Węchadłowski, Wialbut, Wigerd, Wilkoński, Wilkowski, Wiłkomirski, Wirpsza, Wisogierd, Wissogiert, Wizgajło, Wizgerd, Wizgert, Wizgird, Wizgirt, Wojewódka, Wojewódko, Wojtkowicz, Wolski, Wołyński, Wondołowski, Wonikiewicz, Wysocki, Wysogird, Wysogirt, Wyssogierd, Wysygirt, Wyszegerd. Z Zagórski, Zarszyński, Zyk. Ż Żadeyko, Żak, Żerabitycz, Żodejko, Żynawski.

Odrowąż is a Polish coat of arms of probably Moravian origin. It was used by many noble families known as szlachta in Polish in medieval Poland and later under the Polish–Lithuanian Commonwealth, branches of the original medieval Odrowążowie family as well as families connected with the Clan by adoption.

== History ==
Okolski tells that the progenitor of this clan cut off both halves of the moustache of an adversary at a jousting match, and the flesh with it, with the arrow. Bogdan Balbin in notes to Epitome "Rerum Bohemicarum" [Summary of Bohemian Affairs], chapter 15, calls the arms of the Odrowaz family Sagitta circumflexa ["bent arrow"], and adds that some of the earliest houses in Bohemia bore these arms, of whom Tobias was Bishop of Prague, during the times of Premysl Otakar II. In German the arms are known as a "Bartausreisser"

== Blazon ==
Arms: Gules, an arrow in pale point to chief, the base double sarcelled and counter embowed, Argent. Out of a crest coronet a panache of peacock plumes proper, charged with the arms in fess. The shield is red, upon which is a silver arrow pointing upward, and the bottom is divided and curved on both ends. Out of a helmeted crown is a display of peacock plumes, upon which can be seen lying on its side the device as pictured on the shield.

The tinctures (colors) are: azure = blue; gules = red; sable = black; or = gold; argent = silver; vert = green. In heraldry all charges (pictures) on a shield are assumed to be facing dexter (right side).

== Notable bearers ==
Notable bearers of this coat of arms include:

- House of Odrowąż
  - Jacek Odrowąż
  - Czesław Odrowąż
  - Iwo Odrowąż
  - Jan Odrowąż from Sprowa
  - Zofia Odrowąż
  - Stanisław Odrowąż
  - Andrzej Odrowąż
- Joachim Chreptowicz
- Eugen Ritter von Sypniewski-Odrowaz
- Sypniewski
  - Bonifacius Sypniewski
  - Stanisław Sypniewski
  - Feliks Sypniewski
  - Felicjan Sypniewski
- Jan Chryzostom Pieniążek
- House of Szydłowiecki
  - Jakub Szydłowiecki
  - Elżbieta Szydłowiecka
  - Krzysztof Szydłowiecki
  - Zofia Szydłowiecka
- Piotr Wysocki
- Maciej Szukiewicz
- Wojciech Szukiewicz
- Władysław Starewicz
- Zygmunt Pacanowski

== Gallery ==
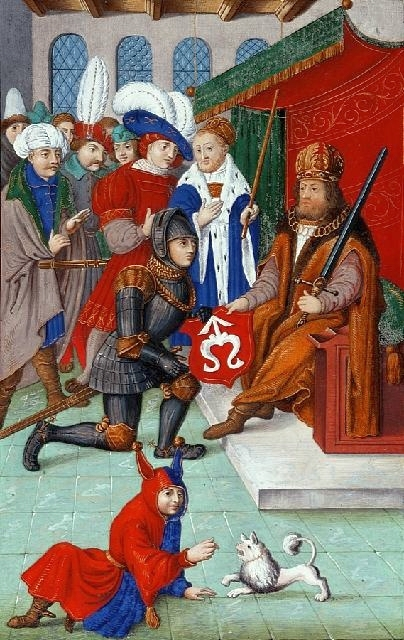
Nobilitation of the House of Odrowąż, Liber Genesos ilustris Familiae Shidlovicae

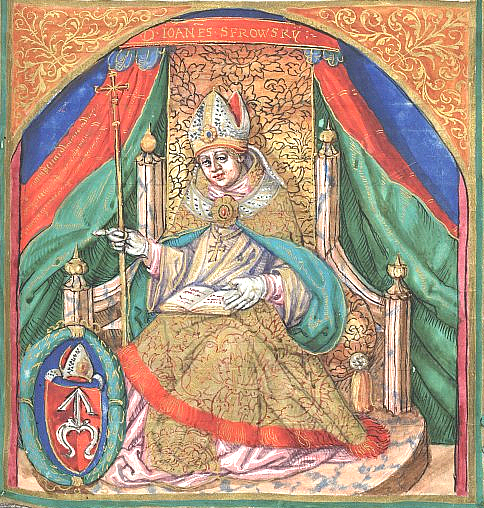
Jan Odrowąż from Sprowa, Archbishop of Poland and Lithuania

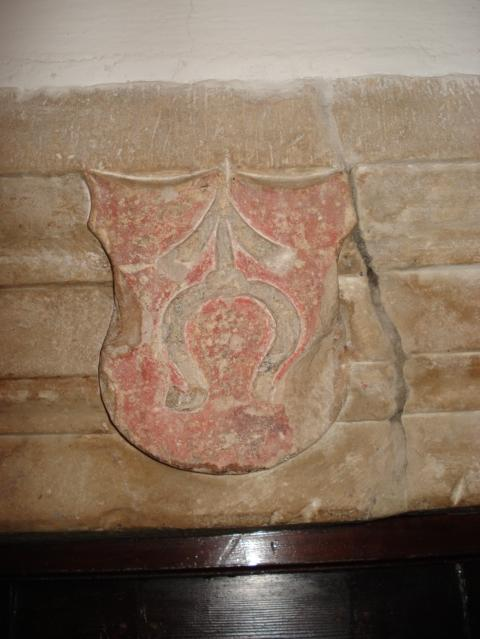
Odrowąż Arms in the Castle of Szydłowiec

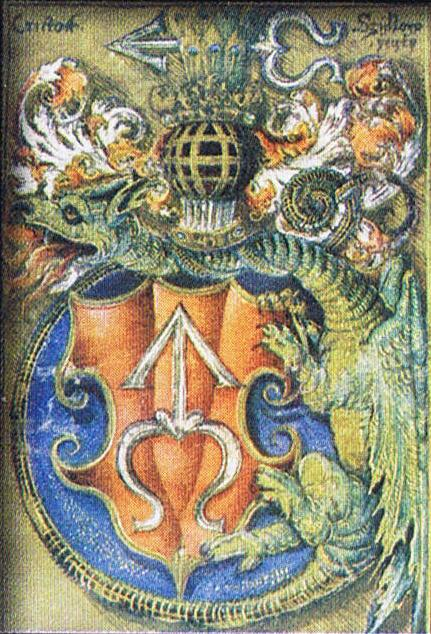
Coat of arms of Chancellor Krzysztof Szydłowiecki

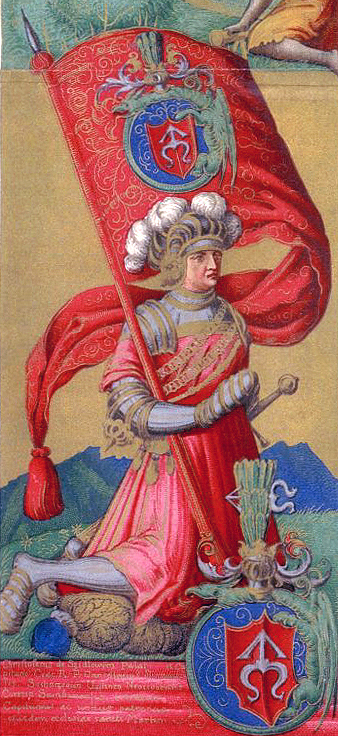
Chancellor Krzysztof Szydłowiecki

== See also ==
- Polish heraldry
- Heraldic family
- List of Polish nobility coats of arms

== Bibliography ==
- Tadeusz Gajl: Herbarz polski od średniowiecza do XX wieku : ponad 4500 herbów szlacheckich 37 tysięcy nazwisk 55 tysięcy rodów. L&L, 2007. ISBN 978-83-60597-10-1.
