= Albrycht Radziwiłł =

Albrycht Radziwiłł may refer to:

- Albrycht Radziwiłł (1558–1592), son of Elżbieta Szydłowiecka and Mikołaj Krzysztof Radziwiłł
- Albrycht Stanisław Radziwiłł (1595–1656)
- Albrycht Władysław Radziwiłł (1589–1636)
