= Mora coat of arms =

Polish coat of arms

Mora
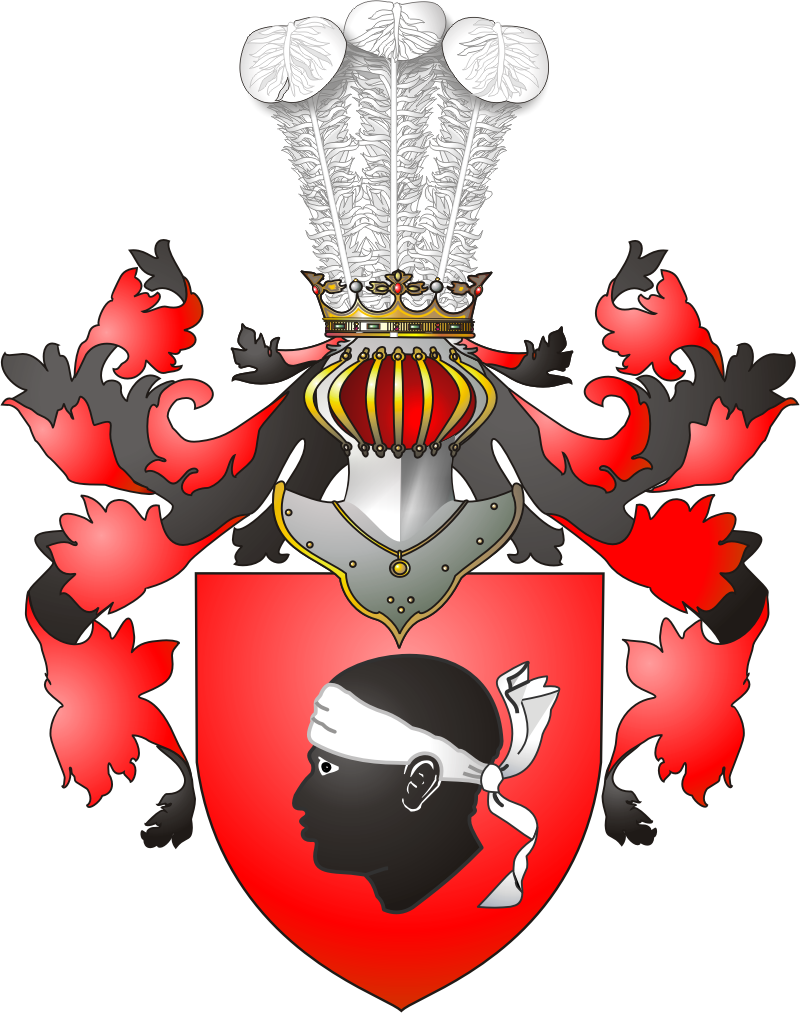
- Alternative names: Morawa, Mory, Murzynowa Głowa
- Earliest mention: 1034, 1412
- Families: Busz, Cibarzewski, Deleszakn, Gardziński, Grzymała, Grzymałowski, Hossel, Kaszubski, Kosuba, Kozuba, Kobuzowski, Kozubowski, Kokociński, Kostycz, Korytowski, Korytkowski, Kruszyna, Krzyźanowski, Kudak, Listopad, Liszawski, Liszewski, Malijewski, Marczonko, Marshal, Marszał, Mieczkowski, Mieszkowski, Mięskowski, Mora, Moraczyński, Morenda, Morgulski, Moryno, Morzycki, Nietyksa, Nietyksza, Nietyxa, Olszyński, Skalski, Sławski, Sorc, Szorc, Stoessel, Swędorski, Szulborski, Żwan

Mora is a Polish coat of arms. It was used by several szlachta families in the times of the Kingdom of Poland and Polish–Lithuanian Commonwealth.

== Blazon ==
A Moorish head on a red background

== See also ==
- Polish heraldry
- Heraldic family
- List of Polish nobility coats of arms
- Coat of Arms of Pope Benedict XVI
- Flag and coat of arms of Corsica

== Bibliography ==
- Franciszek Piekosiński: Heraldyka polska wieków średnich, Kraków, PAU, 1899
