= Jan Chryzostom Pieniążek =

Polish szlachcic

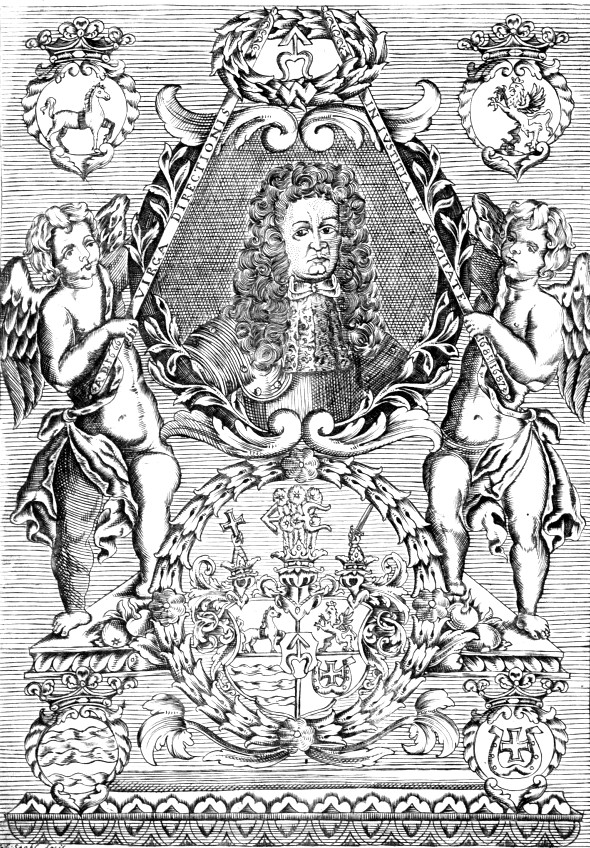
- Coat of arms: Odrowąż
- Born: Abt. 1630
- Died: 1712
- Family: Pieniążek

Jan Chryzostom Pieniążek (c. 1630–1712) was a Polish szlachcic.

Starost of Oświęcim since 1666 and voivode of Sieradz Voivodeship since 1683.

Marshal of the Sejm (zwyczajnego) August 17 - May 4, 1666 in Warsaw.

== Bibliography ==
- Marszałkowie Sejmów I Rzeczypospolitej, s. 72, Wydawnictwo Sejmowe, Warszawa 1993, ISBN 83-7059-047-0
