= Alessandro Kokocinski =

Italian painter (1948–2017)

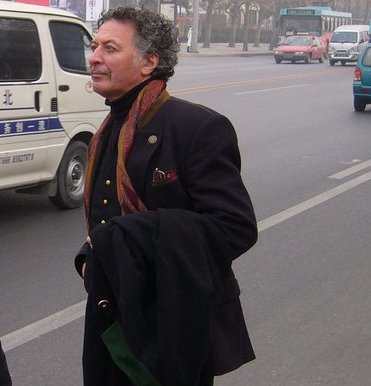
- Kokocinski in 2011
- Born: Alejandro Kokocinski; 3 April 1948; Porto Recanati, Italy
- Died: 12 December 2017 (aged 69); Tuscania, Italy
- Known for: Painter, sculptor, set designer

Alessandro Kokocinski (born Alejandro Kokocinski; 3 April 1948 – 12 December 2017) was an Italian-Argentine painter, sculptor and set designer, of Polish-Russian origin.

== Early life ==
Born in the refugee camp at Porto Recanati, to a mother who had escaped Nazi deportation and a father who had fought with the Anglo-Polish forces, in late 1948 he and his family moved to South America. He spent the first few years of his life in the Misiones and Iguazú forests, and in Paraguay and the Chaco region. In Buenos Aires he witnessed the bombing of the Casa Rosada, and the fall of Perón (1955).

== Career ==
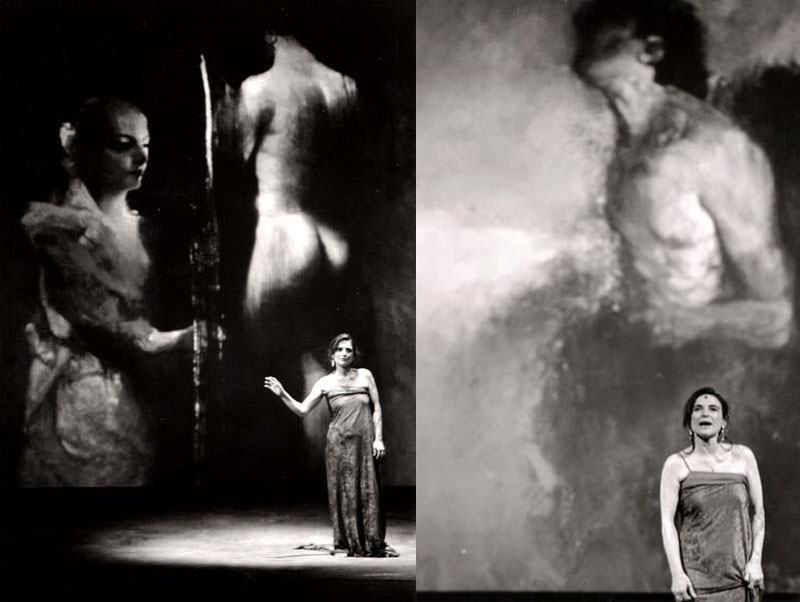
Lina Sastri

When Kokocinski was young, he joined the circus in the Argentine capital. He soon moved into theatre, having studied set design at the school of Saulo Benavente. He designed the sets for “El Guapo del Novecento”. After being filed on police record by the military regime, he was forced to take refuge in Santiago de Chile. His drawings of political protest were exhibited at various universities in Chile. His works were presented by the art critic Mario Pedrosa, and by writers Enrique Araya and Delia del Carril.

He worked on the Allende government’s agrarian reform, in partnership with the Catholic University of Santiago de Chile. Kokocinski was already in Europe by the time Allende fell from government. He exhibited first in Hamburg and later in Rome, presented by Rafael Alberti (who dedicated a poem to him, entitled “Alejandro Kokocinski 1971, pintor”. He settled in Rome and became a pupil of Riccardo Tomassi Ferroni, with whom he shared a studio in Trastevere, together with Carlo Quattrucci.

In 1986 he moved to the Far East and lived there for a few years, travelling between South East Asia and China. In the late 1980s he moved to Germany, where he lived for four years.

He then returned to Italy for good, and there founded the Kosa theatre company with the actress and singer Lina Sastri. He designed lighting, costumes and sets for six of the company's shows, all directed by and starring Sastri. In 2003 he moved to Tuscania (Lazio), where he moved his studio into an ancient, deconsecrated church. He set up the Fondazione Alessandro Kokocinski in the town, an organization aimed at supporting the creativity of young artists (from Italy and all over the world), through training and specialization courses, residential training programmes and exhibitions and events.

In 2016 Kokocinski created the set design and lighting design for Lina Sastri è il mio nome, a musical theatrical show which opened on 4 October 2016 at the Teatro Quirino, Rome. Neapolitan actress and singer Sastri spoke to Il Messaggero newspaper about the "prolific imagination of Alessandro Kokocinski, a truly internationally-renowned painter who observes the world through the eyes of the heart”. She said she “hope[d] the audience appreciates his visually dramatic touch, with which I fully identify".

== Selected exhibitions ==
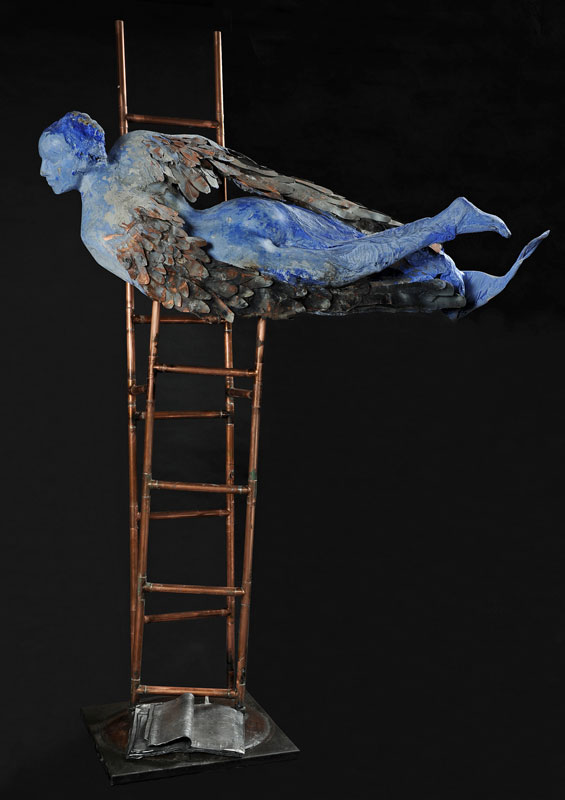
Il cielo celato (scultura in vetroresina e rame)

Kokocinski staged his second solo show in Buenos Aires in 1969. The exhibition included a series of dramatically stylized black and white pencil drawings. The subject matter was: the difficulty of a life in poverty; work; and suffering in general.

In 1979 he took part in a group show at the Printshop Gallery in Amsterdam. The title of the exhibition was "L'immagine dell'uomo dal 1945 ad oggi" ("The image of man from 1945 to the present"). The selection of works was intended to illustrate how artistic creativity had reinterpreted the vision of humanity since the end of the Second World War.

In 1987, at the Hong Kong Arts Festival, eighteen of Kokocinski's pieces went on display in a solo exhibition, which grouped together artists from all over the world in the then-British colony. These works mainly focused on images from the circus tradition, with acrobats and dancers moving across canvases, accompanied by impetuously leaping horses.

In 1999, in Rome, three exhibitions running almost simultaneously at the Istituto Italo-latinoamericano, Palazzo della Pigna and the Galleria Italarte celebrated Kokocinski as a "world pilgrim". His portraits of men and women were "loaded with pathos and pain", according to La Stampa, and painted using superimpositions and faded colours/elements of pain to accentuate their dramatic impact.

Palazzo Venezia in Rome staged an extensive one-man exhibition on Kokocinski in 2003. The exhibition comprised more than sixty works from various takes of his long creative career. One of the most important of these was La Trasfigurazione, a polyptych measuring more than 4 metres high and 14 metres long, made up of five polychrome fiberglass sculptures mounted on wooden panels resting on iron joists.

In 2005 Kokocinski had an exhibition at the Museo Nazionale di Castel Sant' Angelo, Rome, with a sculpture cycle, "L'Ombra delle idee" ("The Shadow of Ideas"), inspired by the philosopher Giordano Bruno. The historian and art critic Claudio Strinati introduced the exhibition. In the same year, he took part in a group show curated by Vittorio Sgarbi entitled "Il Male – Esercizi di Pittura crudele" ("Evil – Exercises in Cruel Painting") at the Palazzina di Caccia di Stupinigi, in Turin, Italy.

One of the artist's major achievements has been the solo show in 2006 in Beijing, at the National Art Museum of China (NAMOC), as part of the events held to celebrate the 'Year of Italy in China'.

In 2008, at the Regia Hall in the Museo Nazionale di Palazzo Venezia, Kokocinski presented "La Potenza dello Spirito", a painting cycle inspired by classicism and myths.

Kokocinski was one of the most popular artists in the group exhibition "Las Americas latinas. Las fatigas del querer" curated by art critic Philippe Daverio in 2009 at the Spazio Oberdan, Milan.

In 2011 Kokocinski was one of the artists chosen to exhibit at the 54th Venice Art Biennale, selected by Vittorio Sgarbi, who curated the Italian Pavilion at the Arsenale.

In Milan, in 2013, the Artespressione gallery presented a series of Kokocinski's drawings, made using mixed media on books and antique paper. The theme was the circus, that magical and mysterious environment in which the artist lived and worked when living in Buenos Aires as a young man.

In September 2015 the Fondazione Roma Museo staged a one-man show on the artist at Palazzo Cipolla, called "Kokocinski. La vita e la Maschera: da Pulcinella al Clown" ("Kokocinski. The life and the Mask: from Pulcinella to Clown"). The exhibition reflects both "the history of a tormented man who has personally experienced exile, political persecution and the cruelty of the world" and the history "of the artist who transforms this into art with paintings, sculptures and installations in which the mask, the clown and Pulcinella become central subjects". The works "present themselves as the spectacle of human fragility. Restless, suffering figures yet full of hope, always struggling to defend the true sense of existence", commented the President of the Fondazione Roma Museo.

== Death ==
Kokocinski died on the morning of 12 December 2017 in Tuscania, Italy, at the age of 69 after suffering from a long illness.

== Gallery ==
Works by Kokocinski and La Trasfigurazione

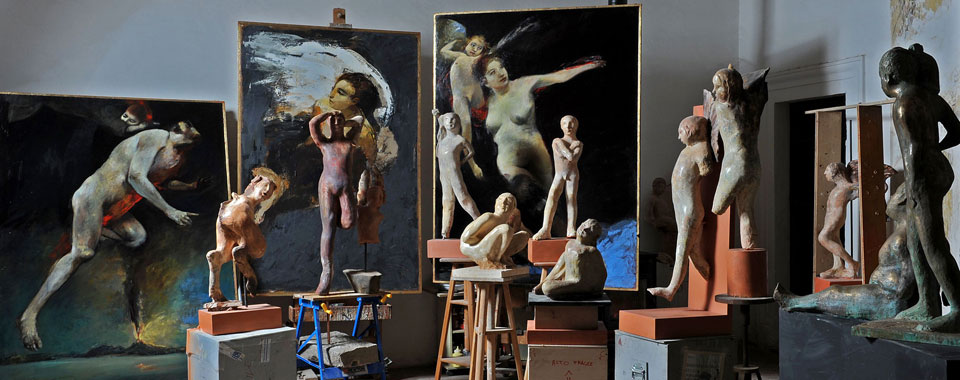
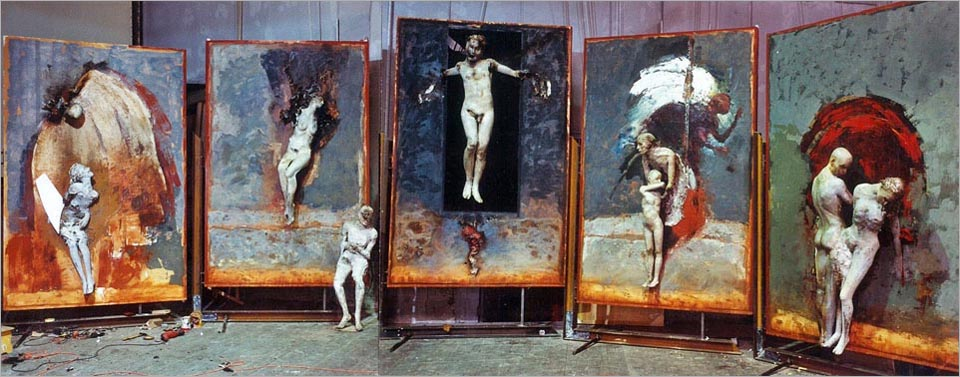
