= Mieszkowski =

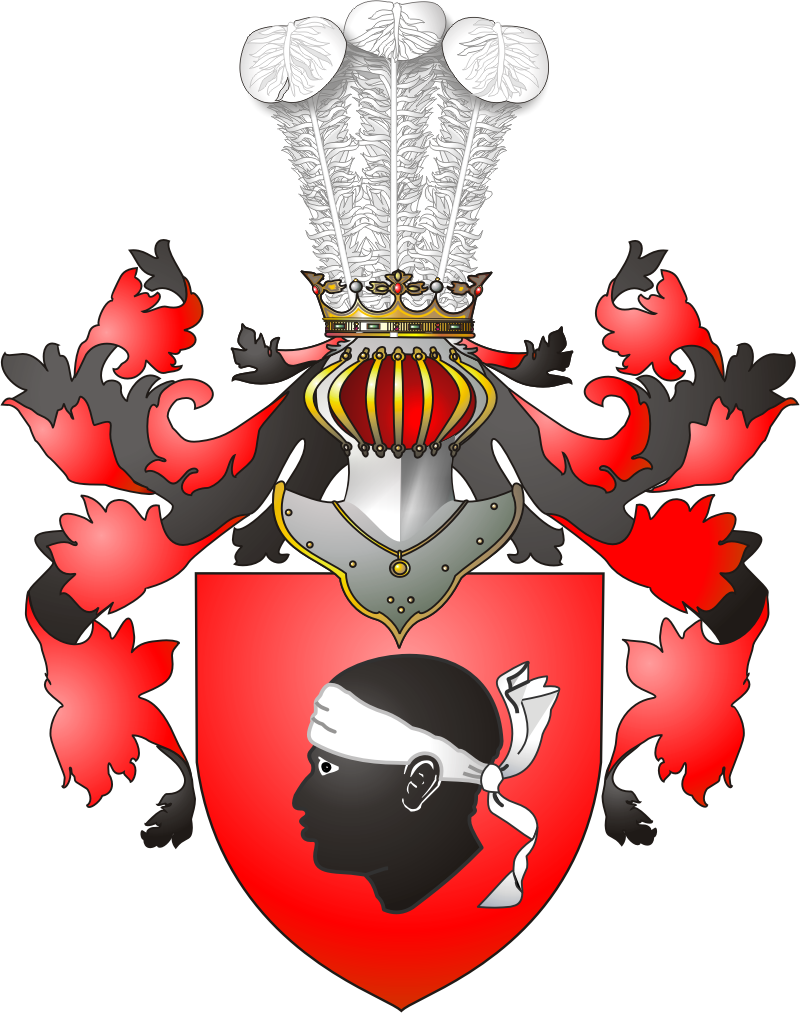
Mora coat of arms used by some of Mieszkowski family

Mieszkowski (feminine: Mieszkowska) is a Polish surname. Some of them use: Doliwa, Junosza, Lis, Mora or Odrowąż coat of arms. Notable people with the surname include:

- Antoni Wincenty Mieszkowski (1865–1900), Polish journalist and writer
- Bronisław Mieszkowski (1873–1967), Polish photographer
- Ed Mieszkowski (1925–2004), American football player
- Jan Kwiryn de Mieszkowski (1744–1819), Polish cavalryman and officer in the American Revolution and the French Revolution
- Katharine Mieszkowski (born 1971), American journalist
- Krzysztof Mieszkowski (born 1956), Polish theatre critic, journalist and politician
- Marian Mieszkowski (1913–2007), Polish engineer, professor
- Mike Mieszkowski (born 1992), German hockey player
- Nikolai Myaskovsky (1881–1950), Russian and Soviet composer
- Piotr Mieszkowski (died 1648), Polish bishop and writer
- Piotr Mieszkowski (Junior) (1630–1696), Polish bishop
- Stanisław Mieszkowski (1903–1952), Polish navy commander
- Tomasz Mieszkowski (born 1972), Polish hockey player
