= Krzysztof Szydłowiecki =

Polish noble (1467–1532)

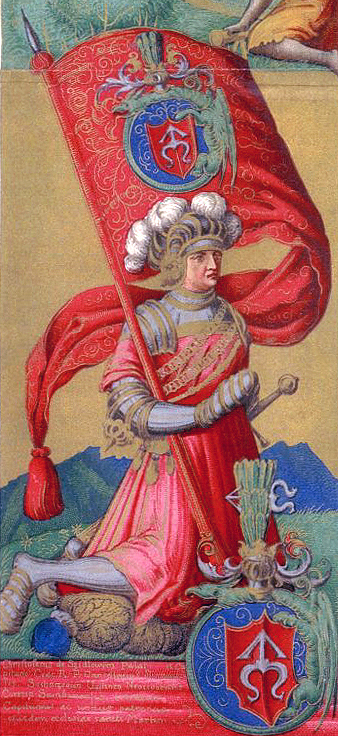
- Coat of arms: Odrowąż
- Full name: Krzysztof Szydłowiecki z Szydłowca h. Odrowąż
- Born: 1467; Szydłowiec
- Died: 30 December 1532; Kraków
- Family: House of Szydłowiecki
- Consort: Zofia z Targowiska h. Tarnawa
- Issue: Zofia Szydłowiecka; Krystyna Szydłowiecka; Elżbieta Szydłowiecka
- Father: Stanisław Szydłowiecki
- Mother: Anna Łabędź

Krzysztof Szydłowiecki (1467–1532) was a Polish noble (szlachcic), magnate, and Count of Szydłowiec.

He was courtier since 1496, Podstoli of Kraków, Treasurer and Marshal of the Court of Prince Zygmunt since 1505, Podkomorzy of Kraków and Court Treasurer of the Crown from 1507 to 1510, castellan of Sandomierz since 1509, Deputy Chancellor of the Crown since 1511, Great Chancellor of the Crown and voivode of Kraków Voivodeship from 1515 to 1527 and castellan of Kraków since 1527. Szydłowiecki was also the Starost of Sieradz, Gostynin, Sochaczew, Nowokrocze, and Łuków.

He is one of the characters on the famous painting by Jan Matejko, Prussian Homage.

== Gallery ==
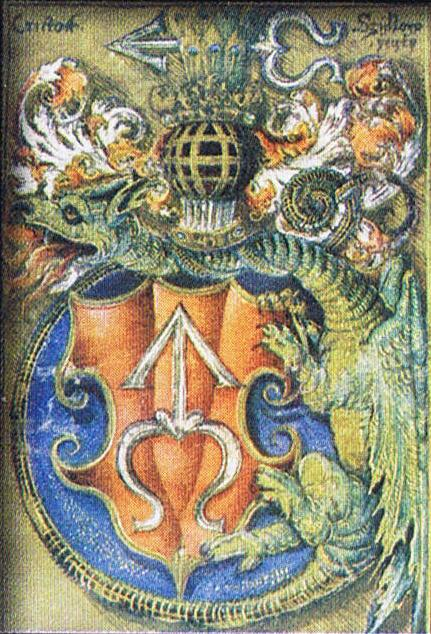
Coat of arms of Chancellor Krzysztof Szydłowiecki in Liber Genesos ilustris Familiae Shidlovicae

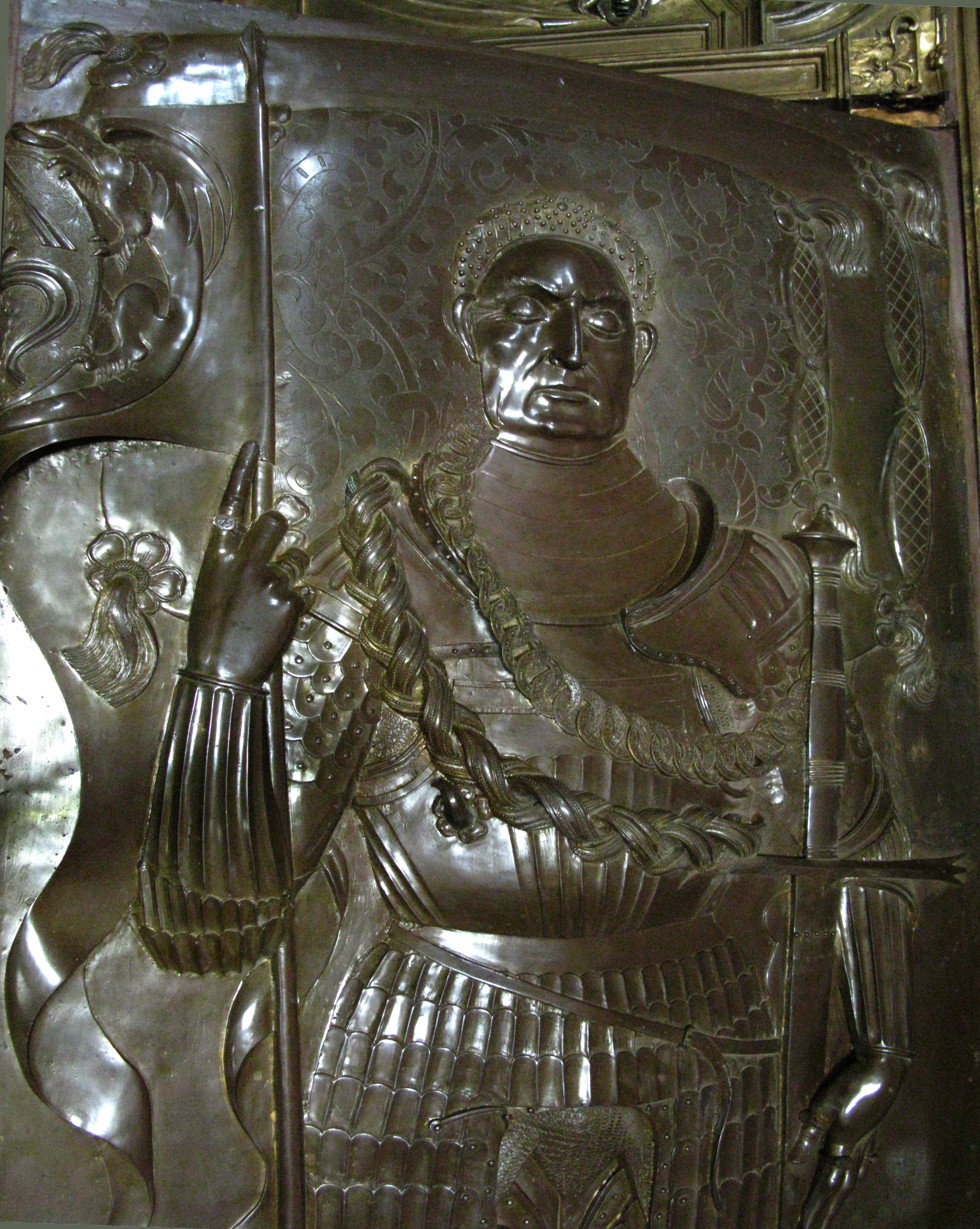
Krzysztof Szydłowiecki tomb effigy in Opatów, 16th century

== Bibliography ==
- Kieszkowski, Jerzy: Kanclerz Krzysztof Szydłowiecki. Z dziejów kultury i sztuki zygmuntowskich czasów, Poznań 1912.
- Wijaczka, Jacek: Kanclerz wielki koronny Krzysztof Szydłowiecki a książę Albrecht pruski, [w:] Hrabstwo szydłowieckie Radziwiłłów. Materiały sesji popularnonaukowej 19 lutego 1994 r., red. Zenon Guldon, Szydłowiec: Burmistrz m. Szydłowca, MLIM, SRS; 1994, s. 23–38. [b. nr ISBN].
- Słownik biograficzny historii powszechnej do XVII stulecia, red. Kazimierz Lepszy, Warszawa: WP, 1968.
