= Saulo Benavente =

Argentine painter

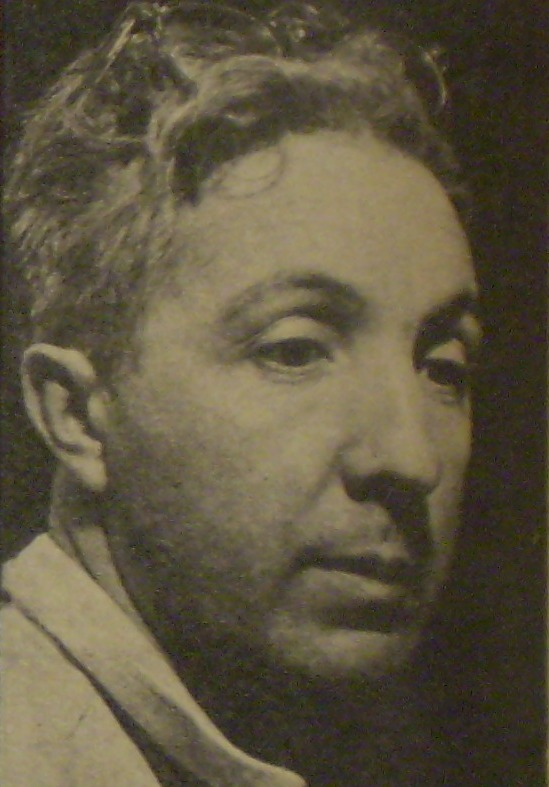
Saulo Benavente

Saulo Benavente (February 11, 1916 – June 26, 1982) was an Argentine painter and set designer.
