= Jakub Szydłowiecki =

Polish nobleman and politician (c. 1456 – 1509)

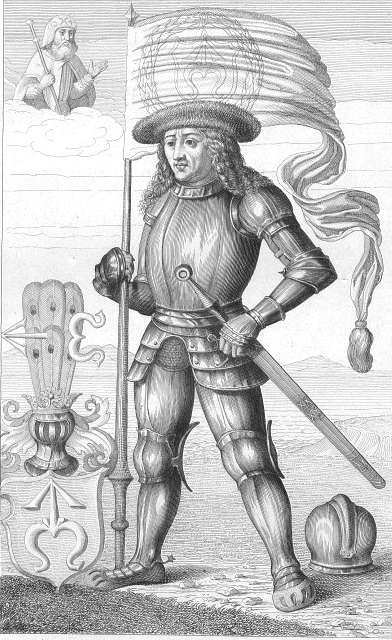
Jakub Szydłowiecki

Jakub Szydłowiecki (c. 1456 – 1509) was a Polish nobleman and politician. In the years 1493-1501 he was Burgrave of Kraków and was a courtier of the king from 1496, Treasurer of the Crown Court in 1497, Grand Teasurer of the Crown from 1501 to 1506, and castellan and starost of Sandomierz, Sochaczew and Łęczyca.

== Family ==
Jakub Szydłowiecki was son (probably fourth) of Stanisław Szydłowiecki and his first wife Barbara ze Starosiedlic i Orońska. He had four siblings - brothers: two named Stanisław, which died in childhood, and Jan (d. before 29 March 1507), a scholastic of Płock, and sister Katarzyna, wife of Stanisław z Grocholic. Jakub had also 7 half-brothers and 8 half-sisters from the second marriage of Stanisław Szydłowiecki with Zofia z Godździkowa, among them Krzysztof Szydłowiecki, Piotr Szydłowiecki, Mikołaj Szydłowiecki, Elżbieta, wife of Andrzej Zborowski, a castellan of Żarnów, and Anna, wife of Wojciech Sobek.

Around 1492 he married Zofia. She was from the family with Półkozic coat of arm. Zofia was well educated, she was writing letters in Latin. Zofia died after 7 May 1519.

== Foundations ==
In the years 1493–1509 in place of a wooden church, he built a brick church in Szydlowiec of local sandstone, and undertook a renovation of Ćmielów Castle

He probably gave an image of Assumption Mary to the church in Ćmielów.
