= Elżbieta Szydłowiecka =

Polish–Lithuanian noblewoman (1533–1562)

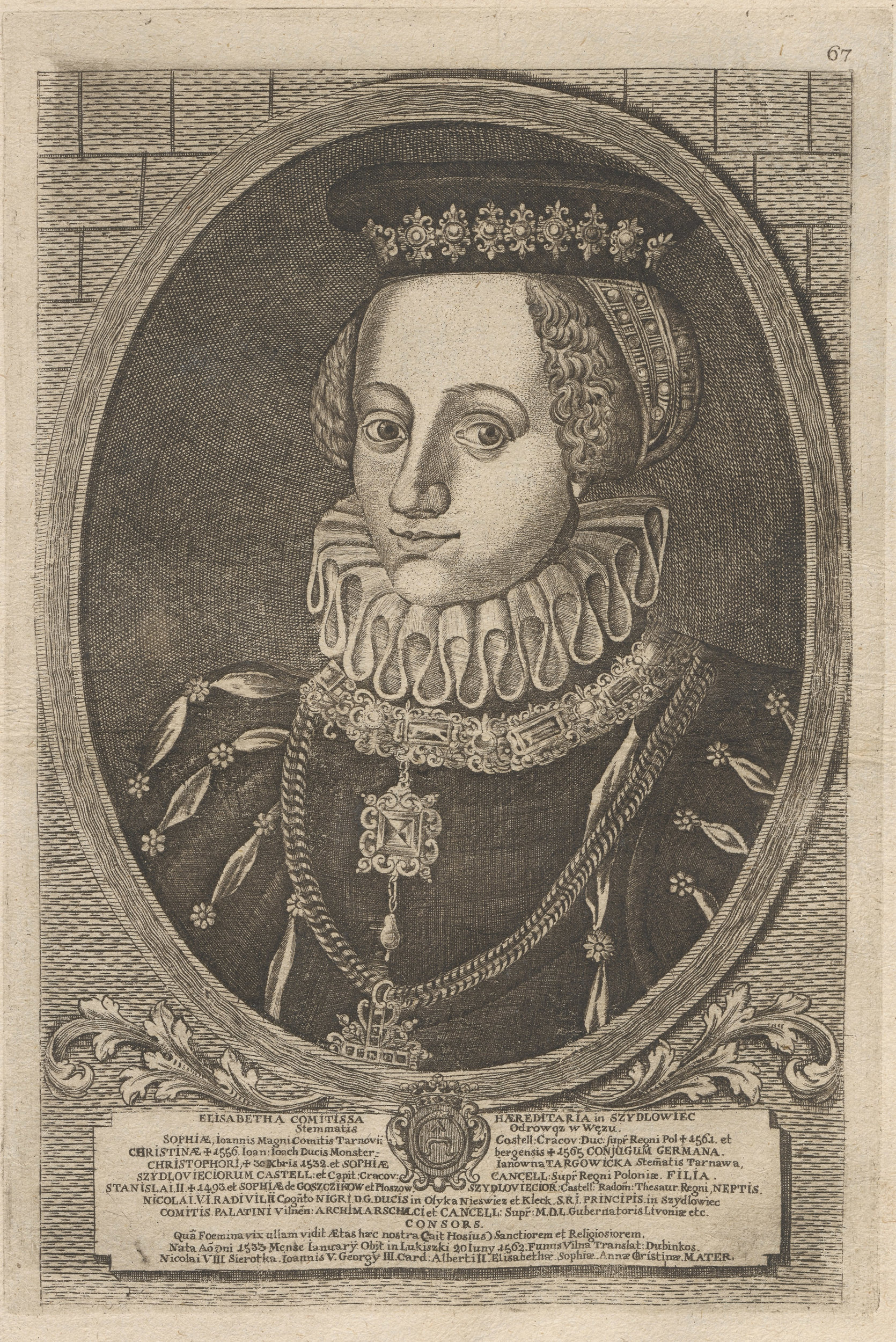
- Coat of arms: Odrowąż
- Full name: Elżbieta Szydłowiecka z Szydłowca h. Odrowąż
- Born: 1533; Szydłowiec
- Died: 20 June 1562; Vilnius
- Family: Szydłowiecki
- Consort: Mikołaj "the Black" Radziwiłł h. Trąby
- Issue: Mikołaj Krzysztof "the Orphan" Radziwiłł; Jerzy Radziwiłł; Albrycht Radziwiłł; Stanisław Pius Radziwiłł; Elżbieta Radziwiłł; Zofia Agnieszka Radziwiłł; Anna Magdalena Radziwiłł; Krystyna Radziwiłł
- Father: Krzysztof Szydłowiecki h. Odrowąż
- Mother: Zofia z Targowiska h. Tarnawa

Elżbieta Szydłowiecka (Lithuanian: Elžbieta Šydloveckaitė; 1533–1562) was a Polish–Lithuanian Calvinist noblewoman heiress.

She was the youngest daughter of Court and Great Chancellor Krzysztof Szydłowiecki and Zofia Tagrowicka h. Tarnawa. She was born in 1533. She married Chancellor, Marshal and Hetman Mikołaj Krzysztof "the Black" Radziwiłł on 12 February 1548. Szydłowiecka died in 1562.

== Bibliography ==
- Jerzy Kierzkowski, Kanclerz Krzysztof Szydłowiecki, t. 1, Poznań 1912, s. 308
- Lubczyński, Mariusz; Pielas, Jacek (2014). "Szydłowiecki Krzysztof". Polski Słownik Biograficzny. Vol. 49. Polska Akademia Nauk & Polska Akademia Umiejętności. p. 562.
