= Vyacheslav Andreyuk =

Soviet footballer

Personal information
- Full name: Vyacheslav Alekseyevich Andreyuk
- Date of birth: 11 April 1945
- Place of birth: Moscow, USSR
- Date of death: 23 February 2010 (aged 64)
- Position: Defender

Senior career*
Years	Team	Apps	(Gls)
1963–1967	FC Torpedo Moscow	111	(0)
1968–1969	Uralmash Sverdlovsk	29	(2)

International career
1966	USSR	2	(0)
- * Club domestic league appearances and goals

Vyacheslav Alekseyevich Andreyuk (Russian: Вячеслав Алексеевич Андреюк) (11 April 1945, in Moscow – 23 February 2010) was a Soviet football player.

== Honours ==
- Soviet Top League winner: 1965.

== International career ==
Andreyuk made his debut for USSR on 23 October 1966 in a friendly against East Germany.
