= Alexei Andreyuk =

Belarusian architect

Alexei A. Andreyuk (Russian: Алексей Анатольевич Андреюк) (born 1959, in Brest, Belarus), studied architecture at the Civil Engineering Institute in Brest, a member of the Belarusian Academy of Architecture, the chairman of the Brest Regional Department of the Belarusian Union of Architects, the manager of architectural workshop “Studio A-3”, a lecturer at the Brest State Technical University. A participant and prizewinner of numerous design contests in Belarus and abroad. Most of his designs are devoted to his native Brest. The concept of Brest Master Plan is based on his historical urban survey of the city.
