= Mikołaj Radziwiłł the Black =

Polish–Lithuanian noble (1515–1565)

Mikołaj Radziwiłł the Black Grand Marshal of Lithuania Grand Chancellor of Lithuania Grand Hetman of Lithuania Voivode of Vilnius
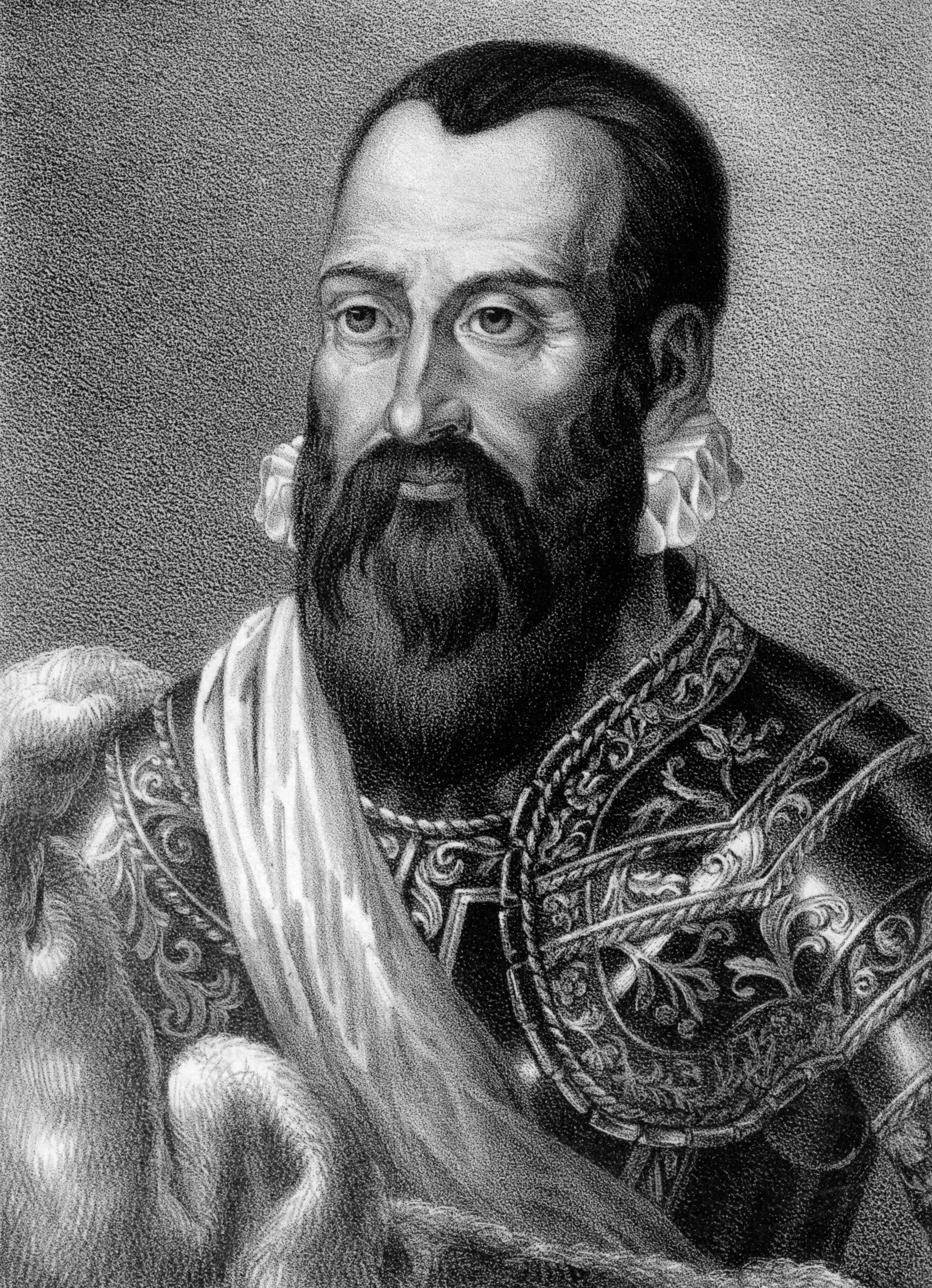
- Portrait of Mikołaj Radziwiłł the Black
- Born: 4 February 1515; Nesvizh, Grand Duchy of Lithuania (now in Belarus)
- Died: 28 May 1565 (aged 50); Vilnius, Grand Duchy of Lithuania
- Resting place: Dubingiai, Lithuania
- Spouse: Elżbieta Szydłowiecka
- Children: with Elżbieta Szydłowiecka: Mikołaj Krzysztof Radziwiłł the Orphan; Elżbieta Radziwiłł; Zofia Agnieszka Radziwiłł; Anna Magdalena Radziwiłł; Jerzy Radziwiłł; Albrycht Radziwiłł; Stanisław Radziwiłł; Jan Zamoyski
- Parent(s): Jan Radziwiłł; Anna Kiszka

Mikołaj Radziwiłł the Black (4 February 1515 – 28 May 1565) (Polish: Czarny, Lithuanian: Juodasis), was a Polish-Lithuanian noble who held several administrative positions within the Grand Duchy of Lithuania, including the Voivode of Vilnius, Grand Lithuanian Chancellor, and the Grand Hetman of Lithuania. He was also Reichsfürst (Prince) of the Holy Roman Empire.

Alternate renditions of his name include Lithuanian: Mikalojus Radvila Juodasis, Belarusian: Мікалай Радзівіл Чорны, and Latin: Nicolaus Radvil. His first name is sometimes given in English as Nicholas.

== Political influence ==
Mikołaj was able to gain much political influence thanks to the romance and then the marriage between his cousin Barbara Radziwiłł and the King of Poland and Grand Duke of Lithuania Sigismund II Augustus. This made him one of the most powerful royal advisers. Mikołaj became Marshal of Lithuania, Grand Chancellor of Lithuania, as well as Palatine of Vilnius, gained immense wealth and became the most powerful magnate in Lithuania of that time. The growing influence of the Radziwiłł family was further bolstered when, during a diplomatic mission to Charles V and Ferdinand I, he and his cousin Mikołaj Radziwiłł the Red received a hereditary title of Prince (Reichsfürst (SRI)).

He formed an alliance with his cousin Mikołaj Radziwiłł the Red against other notable Lithuanian families in the rivalry for the dominant status in the Great Duchy of Lithuania. This alliance marked the formation of a dynastic-like cooperation between Radziwiłłs and showed how family interests could affect magnates' relations with the state. Both Radziwiłłs backed the cause of Lithuania's sovereignty and opposed the growing Polish–Lithuanian union. He led the Lithuanian delegation which travelled to the Sejm of the Kingdom of Poland in Warsaw due to Lithuanian military failures in the Livonian War and accepted to conclude only a limited union of Lithuania and Poland without the unification of the two countries into one country, but it was not concluded.

Despite opposing close ties with Poland, he was the chief negotiator in the successful negotiation between the Grand Duchy of Lithuania and the state controlled by the Livonian Order, which led to the secularisation of Livonia and its union with the Grand Duchy of Lithuania in 1562.

Mikołaj contributed to the ongoing Polonisation of the Grand Duchy, influencing other Lithuanian nobles to follow him in adopting Polish culture – its fashion, customs and language. Despite being a fervent opponent of the closer union with Poland, he was an active supporter of Polish culture in Lithuania. He himself did not speak Lithuanian; his knowledge of Ruthenian was limited. Polish was his native language and the only one he was able to use fluently.

== Religious activities ==
He was known for his religious beliefs, as he was one of the most prominent converts and advocates of the Reformed churches faith in Grand Duchy of Lithuania. He provided financial support for the printing of the first complete Polish translation of the Bible in 1563 in Brest-Litovsk, distributed works written in defense of the Reformed faith, financed a church and college in Vilnius, supported educated Protestants, and in various other ways fostered the Calvinist faith. He is known to have exchanged letters with John Calvin and protected religious exiles from Italy. Because Protestants supported the usage of local languages, he is also believed to have funded Lithuanian churches and schools.

== Legacy ==
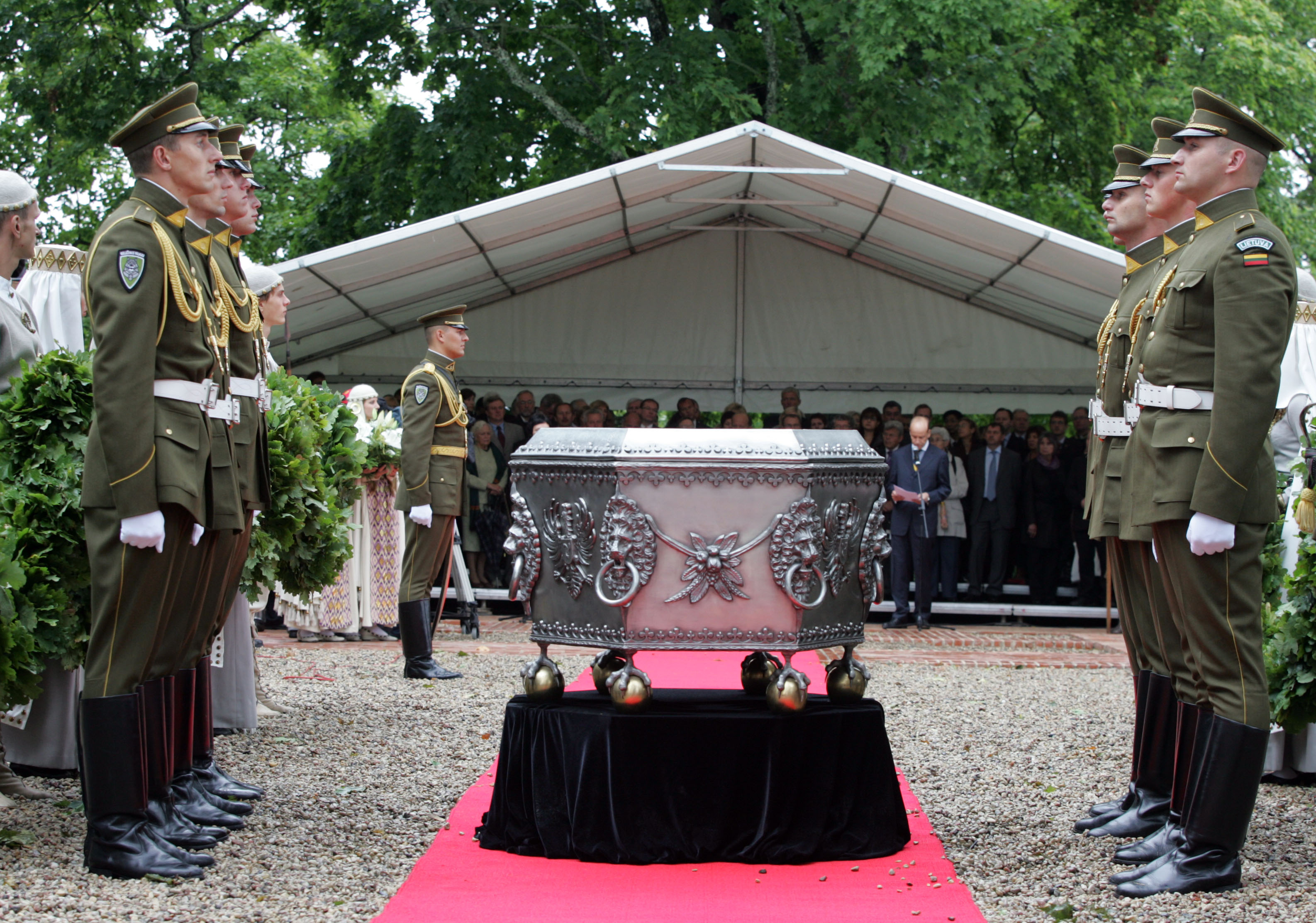
Reburial of Mikołaj the Black in the Dubingiai, Lithuania

With the exception of his daughter Anna, all his children converted to Roman Catholicism and became ardent supporters of the Counter Reformation. He is remembered by a statue in the Brest Millennium Monument.

In the early 21st century Mikołaj Radziwiłł the Black's remains and his cousin Mikołaj Radziwiłł the Red's remains were discovered in the cellar of a demolished Evangelical Reformed Church of the Dubingiai Castle and in 2009 they were reburied during a formal ceremony in the Radziwiłł Pantheon of the Dubingiai Castle.

== Gallery ==
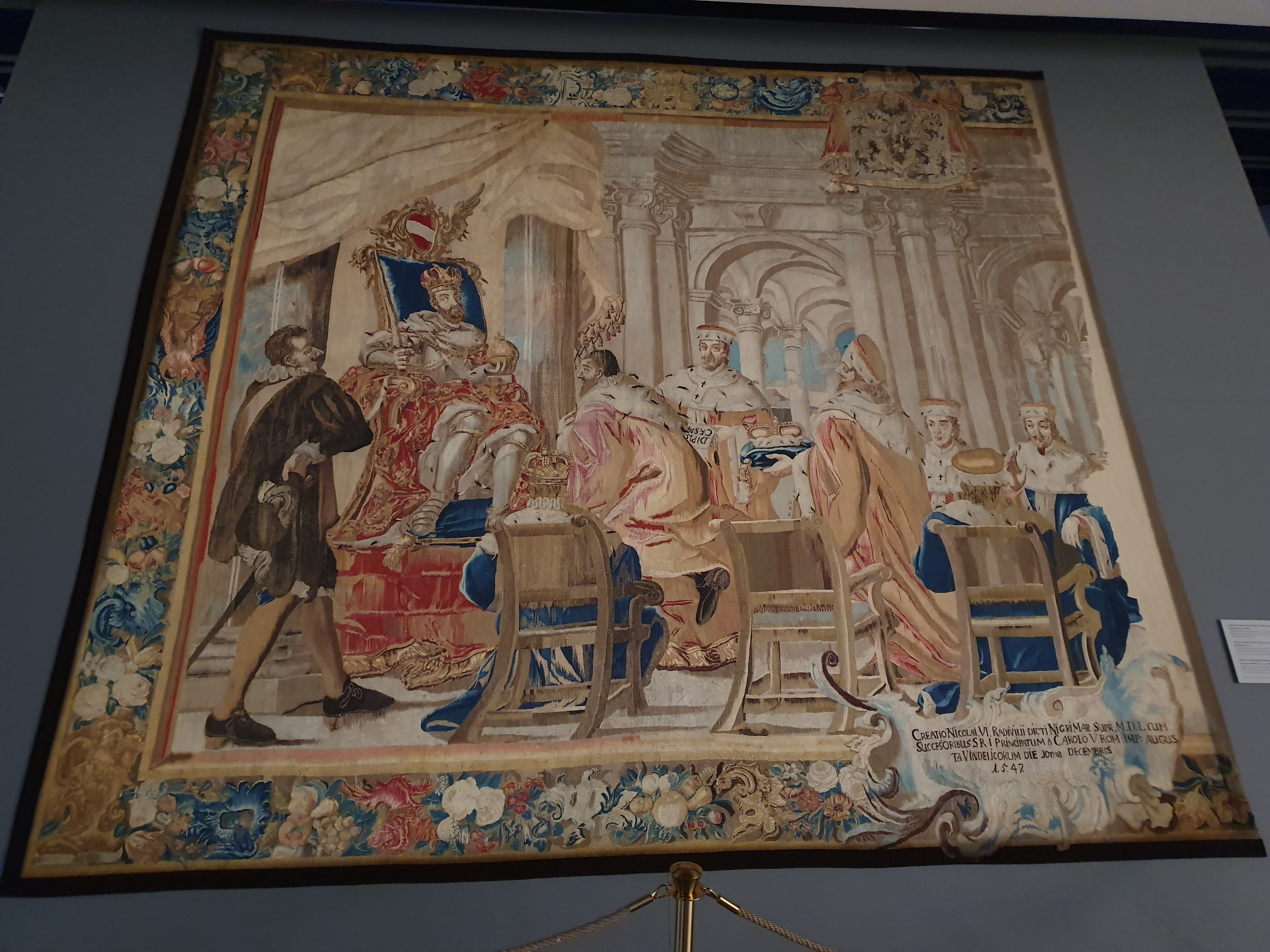
Tapestry which depicts Emperor Charles V granting the title of prince to Mikołaj Radziwiłł the Black in 1547

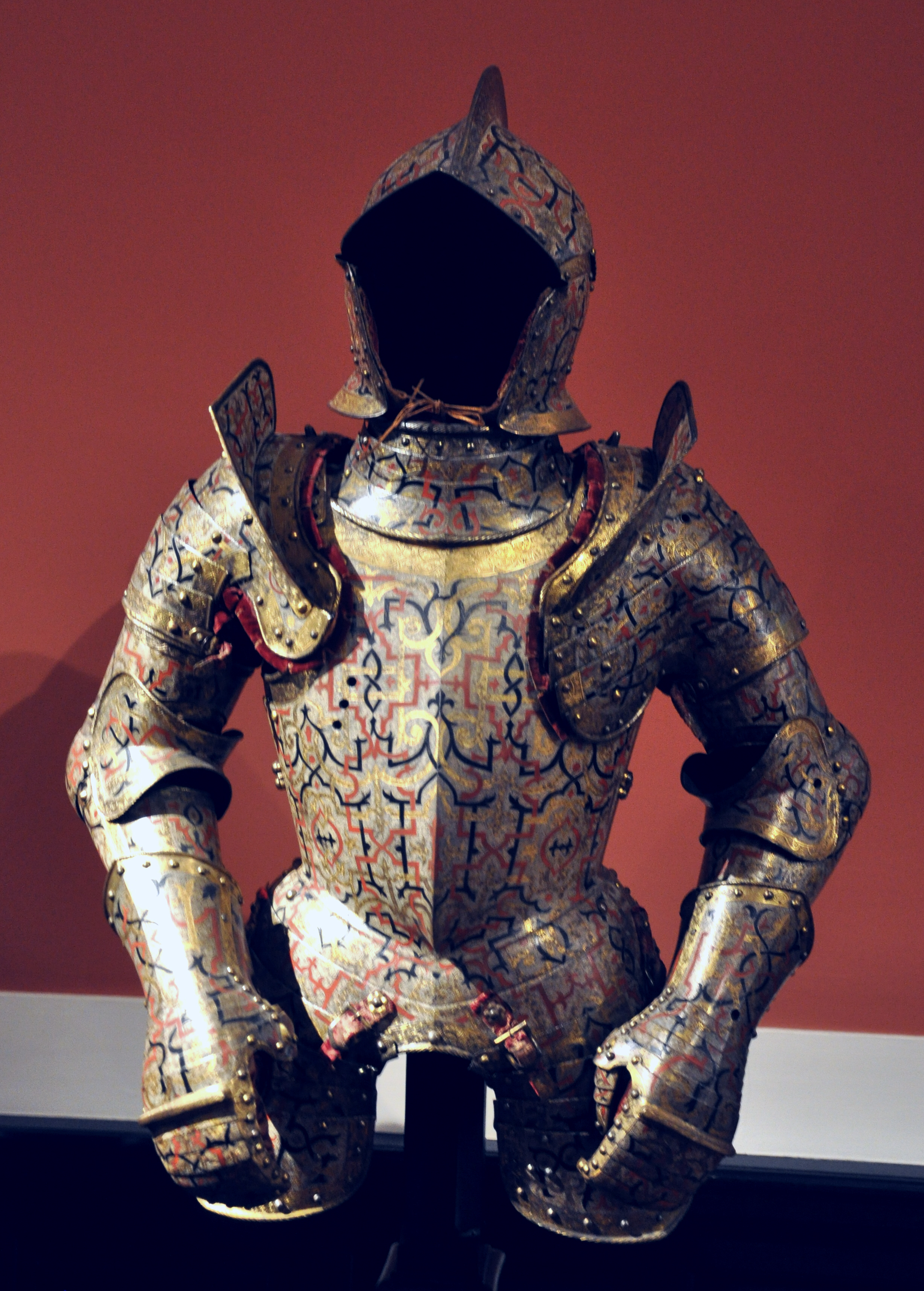
Armor which belonged to Mikołaj the Black

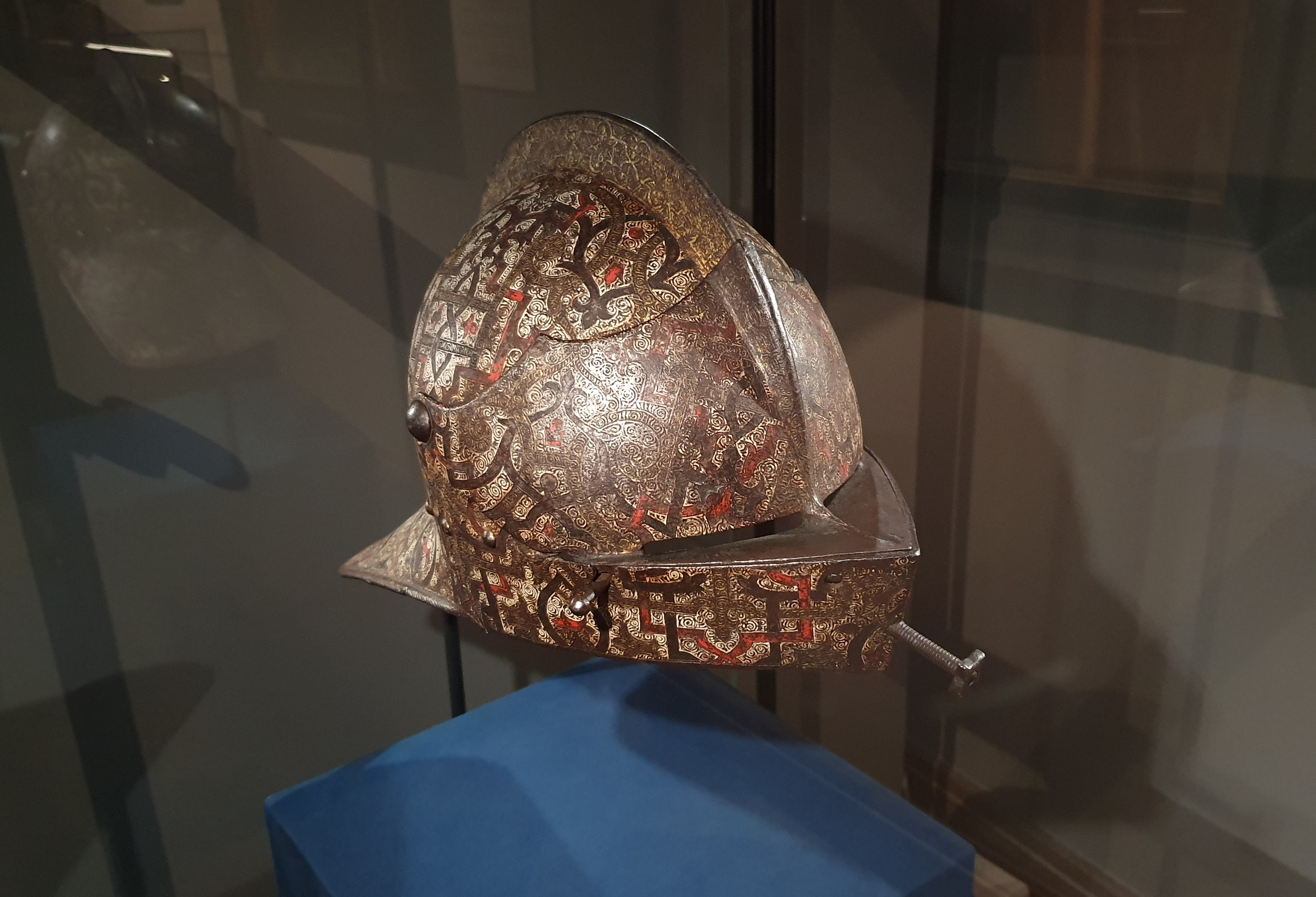
Tournament helmet which belonged to Mikołaj the Black

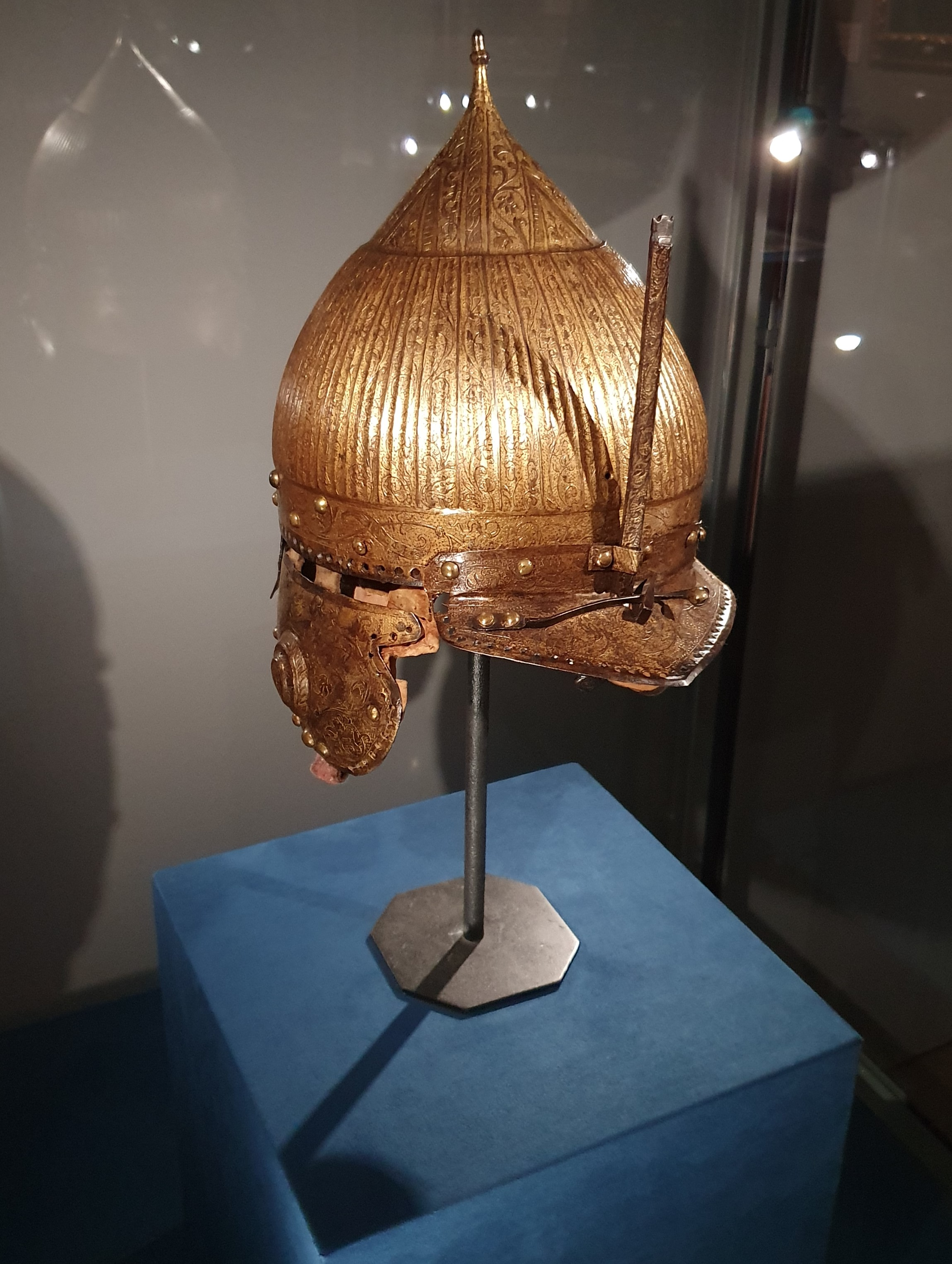
German-made Oriental-styled helmet which belonged to Mikołaj the Black

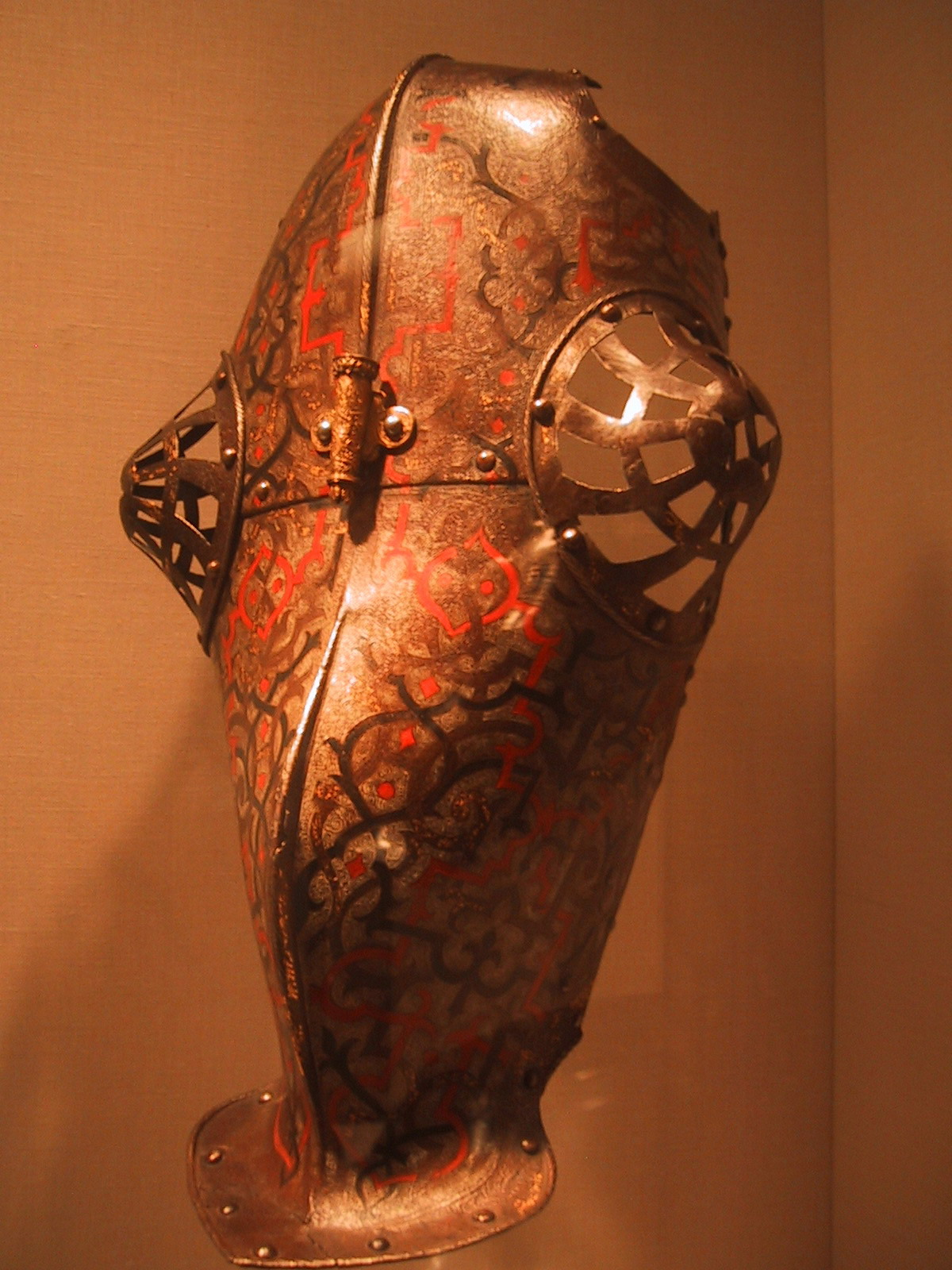
Chanfron which belonged to Mikołaj the Black

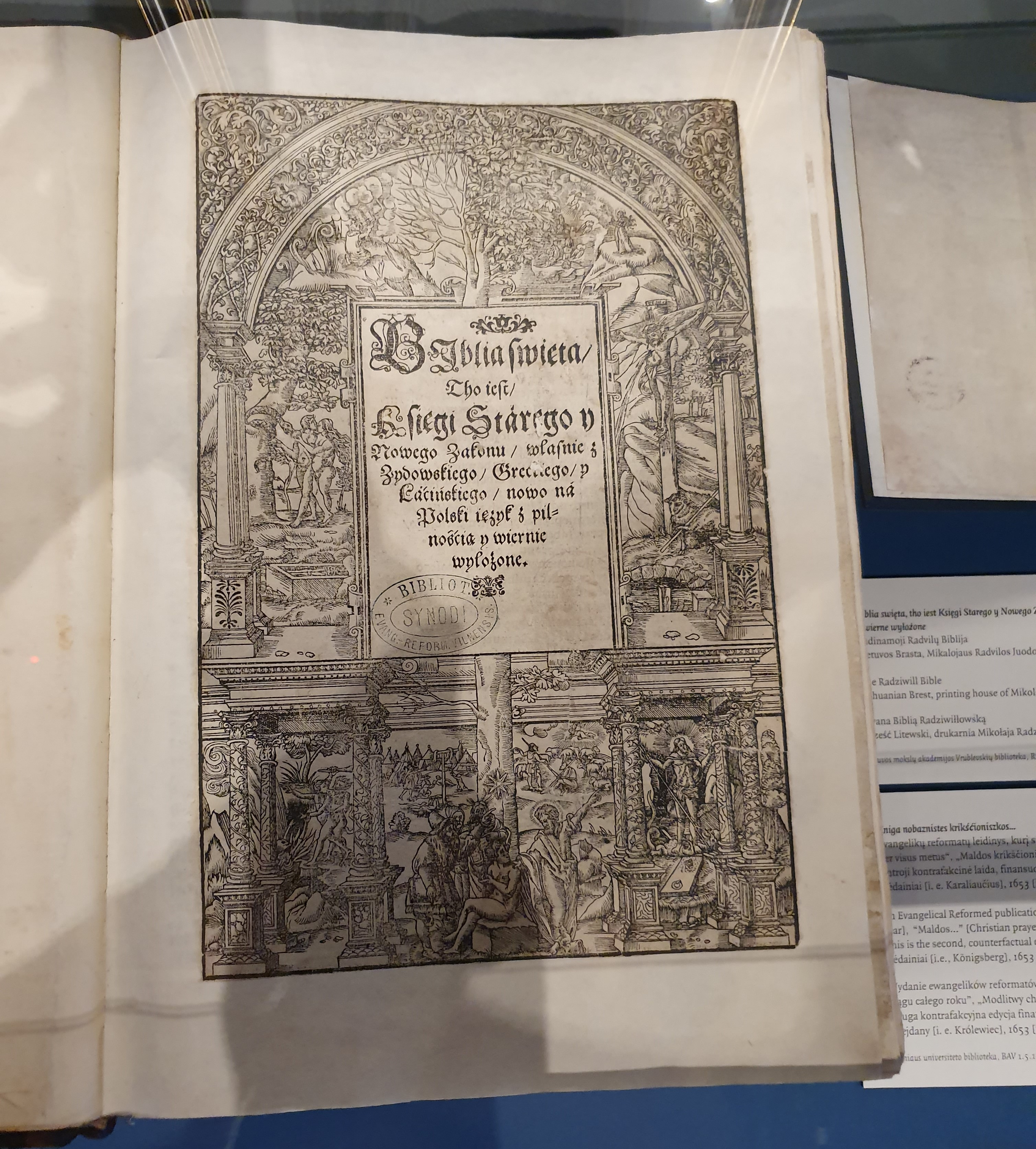
The Radziwiłł Bible (1563), printed in his printing house in Lithuanian Brest

== Bibliography ==
- Józef Jasnowski, Mikołaj Czarny Radziwiłł (1515–1565). Kanclerz i marszałek ziemski Wielkiego Księstwa Litewskiego, wojewoda wileński, Oświęcim 2014.
