= Mikołaj Krzysztof Radziwiłł the Orphan =

Polish–Lithuanian nobleman (1549–1616)

Mikołaj Krzysztof Radziwiłł
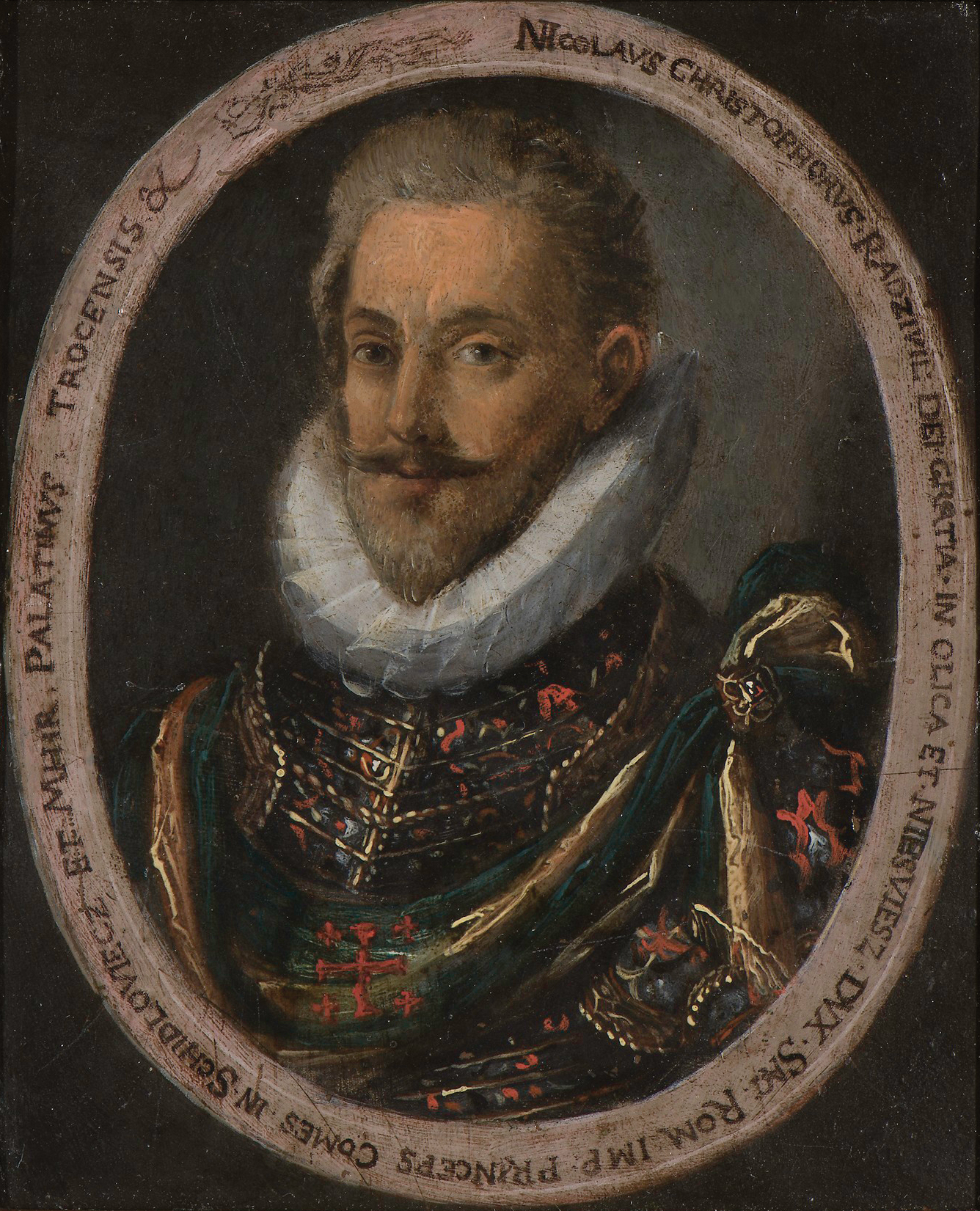
- Born: 2 August 1549; Ćmielów, Crown of the Kingdom of Poland
- Died: 28 February 1616 (aged 66); Nesvizh, Polish–Lithuanian Commonwealth
- Spouse: Elżbieta "Halaszka" Eufemia Wiśniowiecka
- Children: with Elżbieta "Halaszka" Eufemia Wiśniowiecka: Jan Jerzy Radziwiłł; Elżbieta Radziwiłł; Albrycht Władysław Radziwiłł; Mikołaj Radziwiłł; Zygmunt Karol Radziwiłł; Katarzyna Radziwiłł; Krystyna Radziwiłł; Aleksander Ludwik Radziwiłł
- Parent(s): Mikołaj Radziwiłł the Black; Elżbieta Szydłowiecka

Prince Mikołaj Krzysztof Radziwiłł (Note: Although titles like prince could not be granted by kings of the Commonwealth to the egalitarian szlachta, the Radziwiłł family received the title of a Prince of the Holy Roman Empire and the imperial standing from emperor Ferdinand I.) (Lithuanian: Mikalojus Kristupas Radvila; 2 August 1549 – 28 February 1616), nicknamed "the Orphan" (Polish: Sierotka, Lithuanian: Našlaitėlis), was a Polish–Lithuanian nobleman (szlachcic). He served as Ordynat of Nyasvizh from 1586, Court Marshal of Lithuania from 1569, Grand Marshal of Lithuania from 1579, castellan of Trakai from 1586, voivode of Trakai Voivodeship from 1590, voivode of Vilnius Voivodeship from 1604, and governor of Šiauliai. After the treaty at Vienna in 1515, all Radziwills were Imperial Princes and he held a position as Imperial Prince of the Holy Roman Empire.

== Biography ==
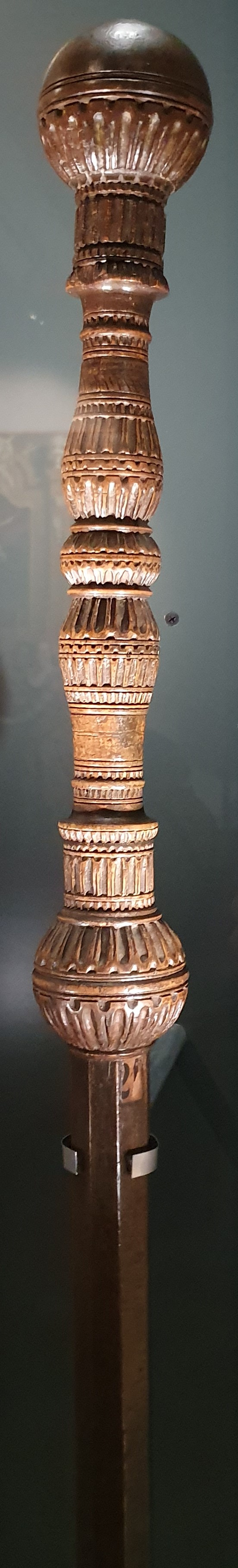
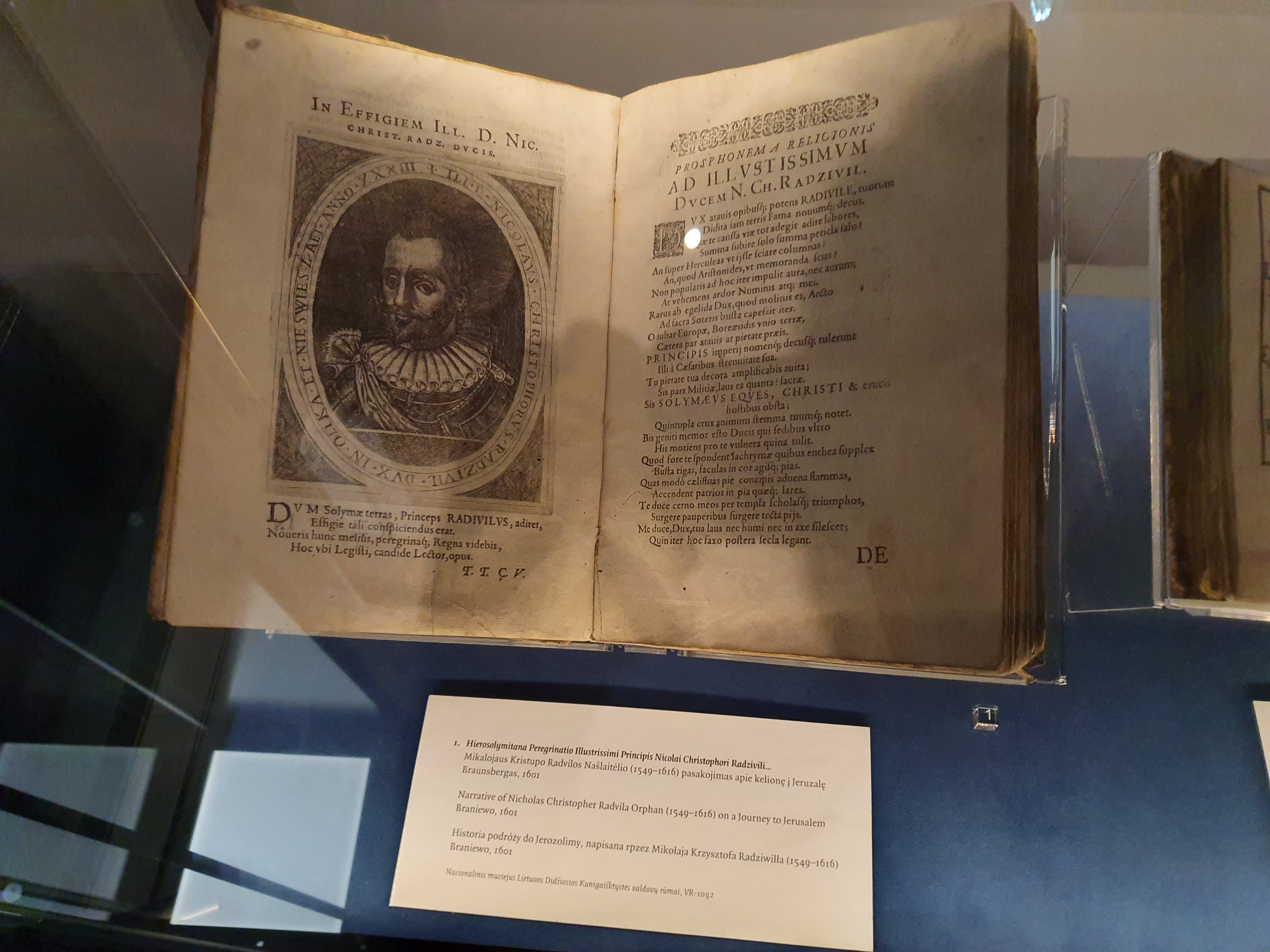
Mikołaj's pilgrimage stick (left) and book about his trip to the Holy Land (right)

Mikołaj was nicknamed "the Orphan", in his infancy, by the Polish king and Lithuanian grand duke Sigismund II Augustus whilst his parents were still alive. He married Halaszka Eufemia Wiśniowiecka on 24 November 1584, a Calvinist, who under his influence, converted to Roman Catholicism.

He took part in the Livonian War against Muscovite forces. In 1573, he was a member of a diplomatic mission to France to the future king of Poland and grand duke of Lithuania, Henry III of France.

Unlike many other members of Radziwiłł family he tried to stay away from politics, especially from the dynastic clan politics of some of other Radziwiłłs like Janusz Radziwiłł; he also supported the forces loyal to the king and Polish–Lithuanian Commonwealth during the Zebrzydowski Rebellion, a szlachta's confederation threatening the king. He attempted to convince the confederates to surrender without unnecessary bloodshed.

Like other members of the Radziwiłł family, he couldn't escape the political ambitions of his family, and when necessary, he would support them. He successfully campaigned for a royal pardon for his cousin Janusz, one of the organisers of the confederation's rokosz (rebellion). However, he refused to support the Krzysztof 'Piorun' Radziwiłł, whose conflict with another powerful family threatened to plunge the Grand Duchy into civil war.

Mikołaj became famous for a vivid account of his eventful pilgrimage to the Holy Land published in Latin in 1601 and later translated into Polish. During his voyage he visited not only Palestine, but also Syria, Egypt, Crete, Cyprus, Italy, and Greece. Robert Burton, while on the subject of St. Elmo's fire, wrote of this voyage in his Anatomy of Melancholy: "Radzivilius, the Polonian duke, calls this apparition, Sancti Germani sidus; and saith moreover that he saw the same after in a storm, as he was sailing, 1582, from Alexandria to Rhodes".

While in Rome, Mikołaj met Piotr Skarga and Stanislaus Hosius, who convinced him to convert from Calvinism to Catholicism, as later did his brothers, many upon his insistence. He was also known for his cultural and charity sponsorships. He was a founder of many cloisters, hospitals and churches. One of the chapels in the Jesuit church in Nesvizh, founded by Mikołaj, would become the Radziwiłł family mausoleum, serving them for the next two and a half centuries.

In Nieśwież, which became his seat, he also built a fortified castle. He was a patron of artists and scientists; for example he supported the works of cartographers such as Tomasz Makowski.

== See also ==
- Saul Wahl
