= Olyka Castle =

Castle in Olyka, Ukraine

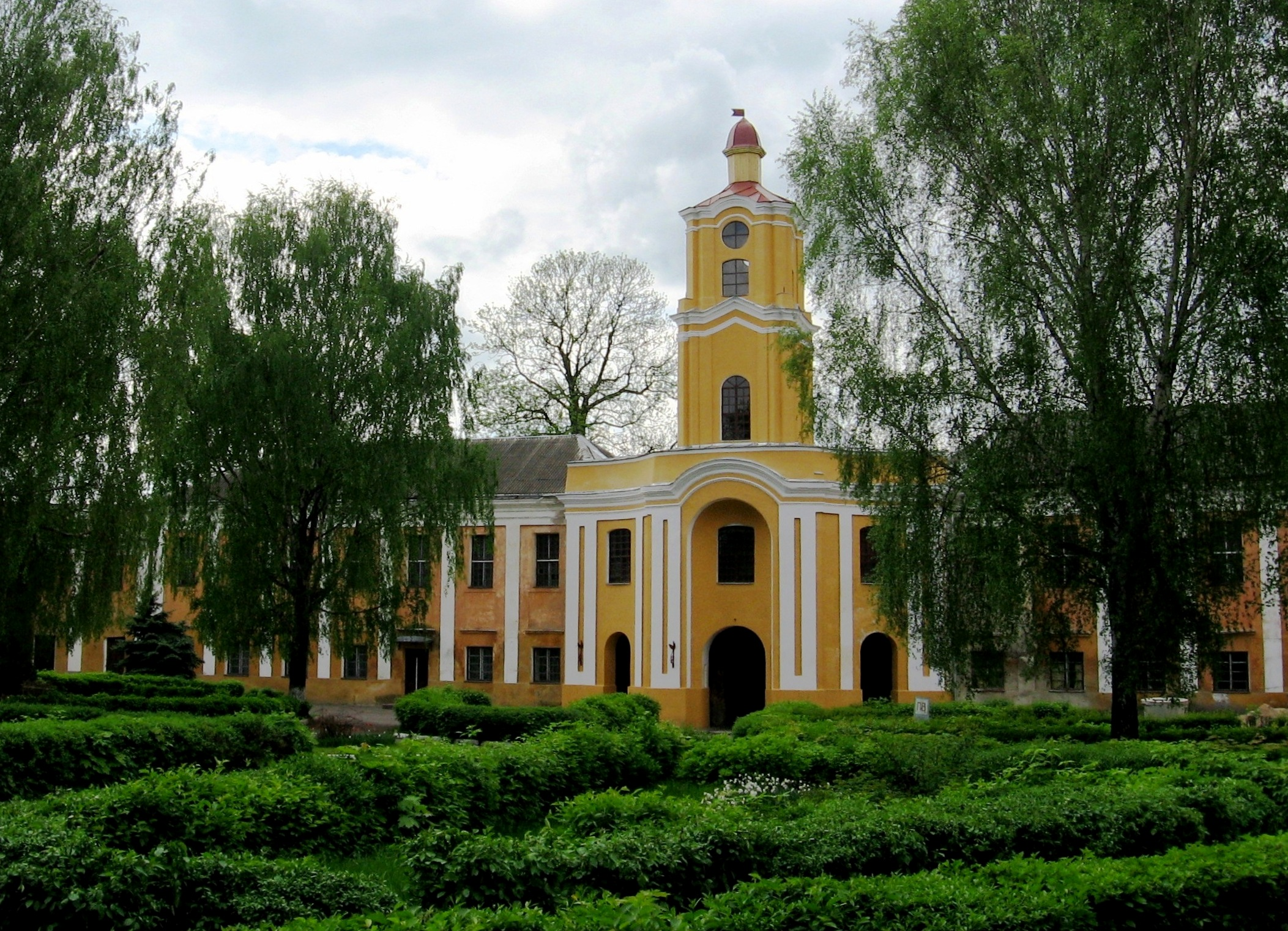
- Entrance gate from Olyka castle seen from the courtyard

- Location within Ukraine
- 50°43′24″N 25°48′31″E

History
- Built: 1564
- Built for: Mikołaj "the Black" Radziwiłł

Immovable Monument of National Significance of Ukraine
- Official name: Замок (Castle)
- Type: Architecture
- Reference no.: 030128

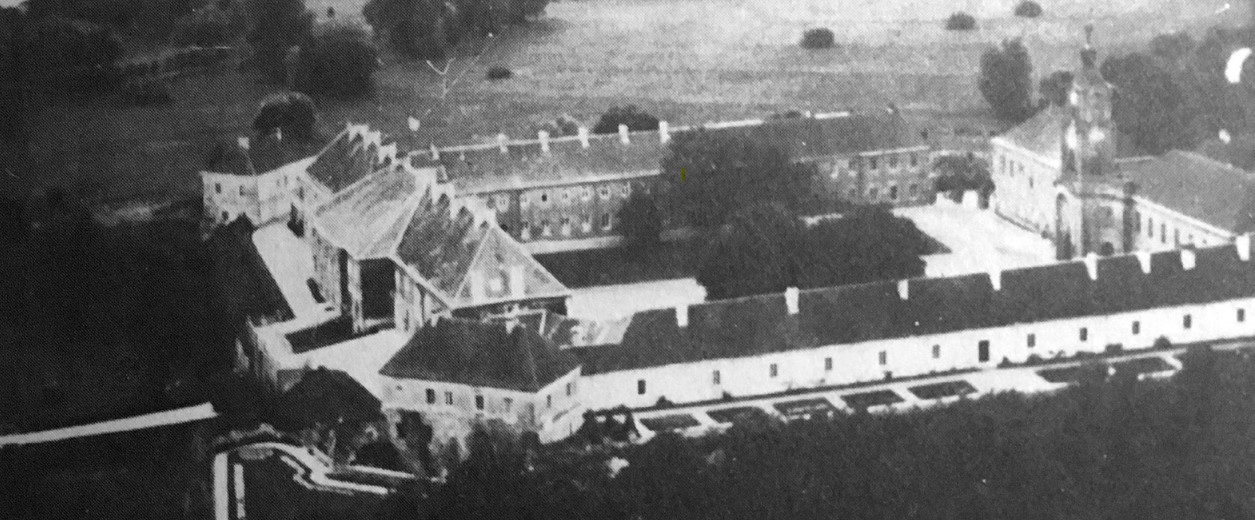
Olyka castle around 1914

The Olyka Castle (Ukrainian: Олицький замок, romanized: Olyts'kyi zamok; Polish: Pałac Radziwiłłów w Ołyce) is a fortified palace in Olyka, Ukraine. Constructed in 1564, it became the principal seat of the Radziwiłł family in Volhynia, once part of the Polish–Lithuanian Commonwealth and now Ukraine. The Radziwiłłs hold the castle for almost four hundred years, since the last owner, Janusz Radziwiłł, owned the castle till 1945. After 1945, it was confiscated and changed into a psychiatric hospital. In 2021, it was transferred to the Volyn museum and is now open for the public.

The castle is a so-called 'Palazzo in Fortezza', a structure where a palace or noble residence is incorporated or built within a fortress of fortified complex. It is one of the largest aristocratic residences in Ukraine with over two hundred rooms, and a courtyard larger than the Piazza San Marco in Venice.

== History ==
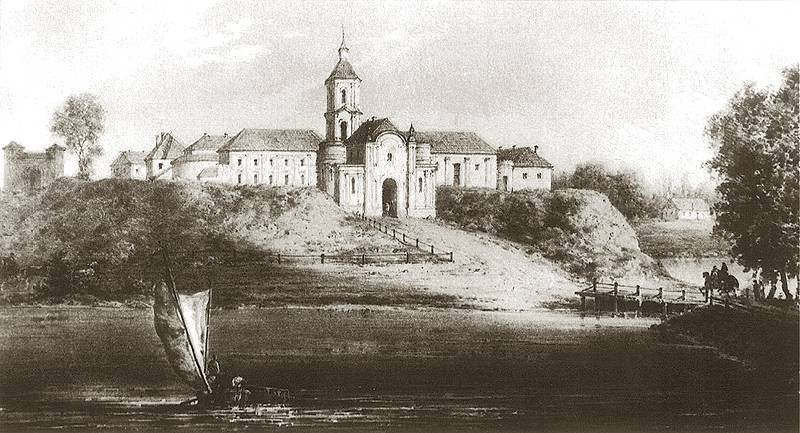
Olyka castle in the 19th century

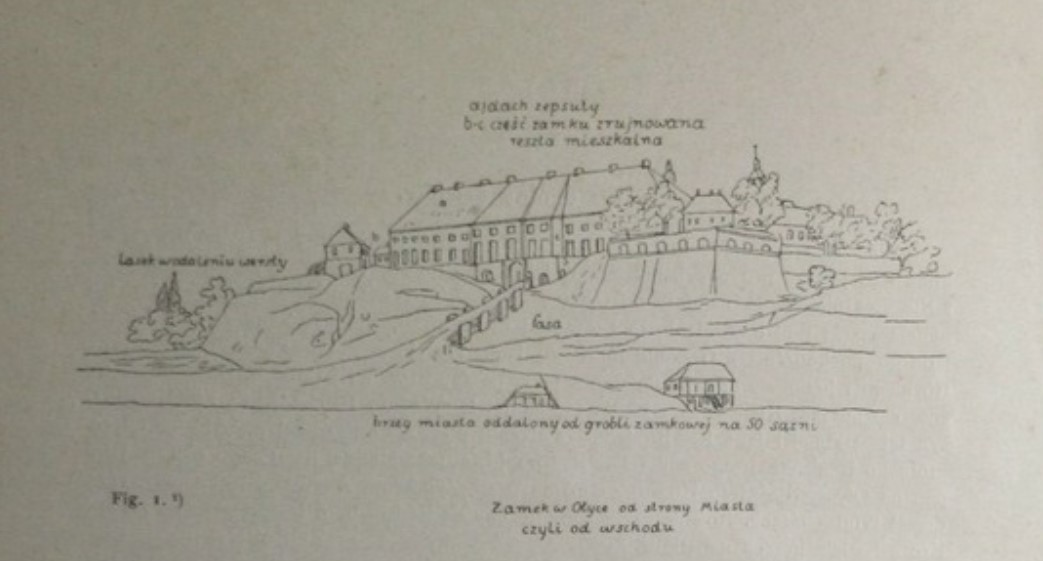
Olyka castle

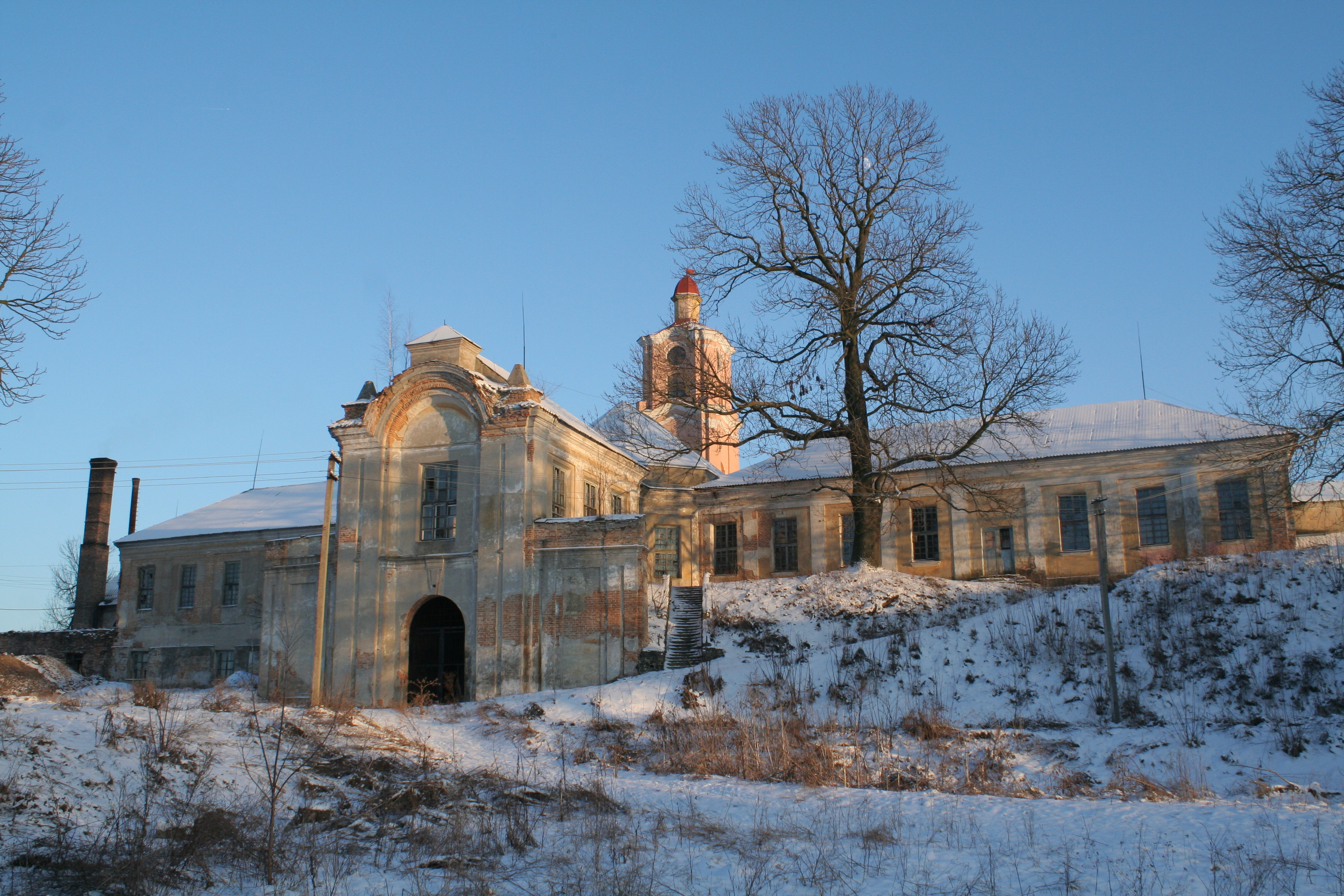
Olyka castle entrance in winter

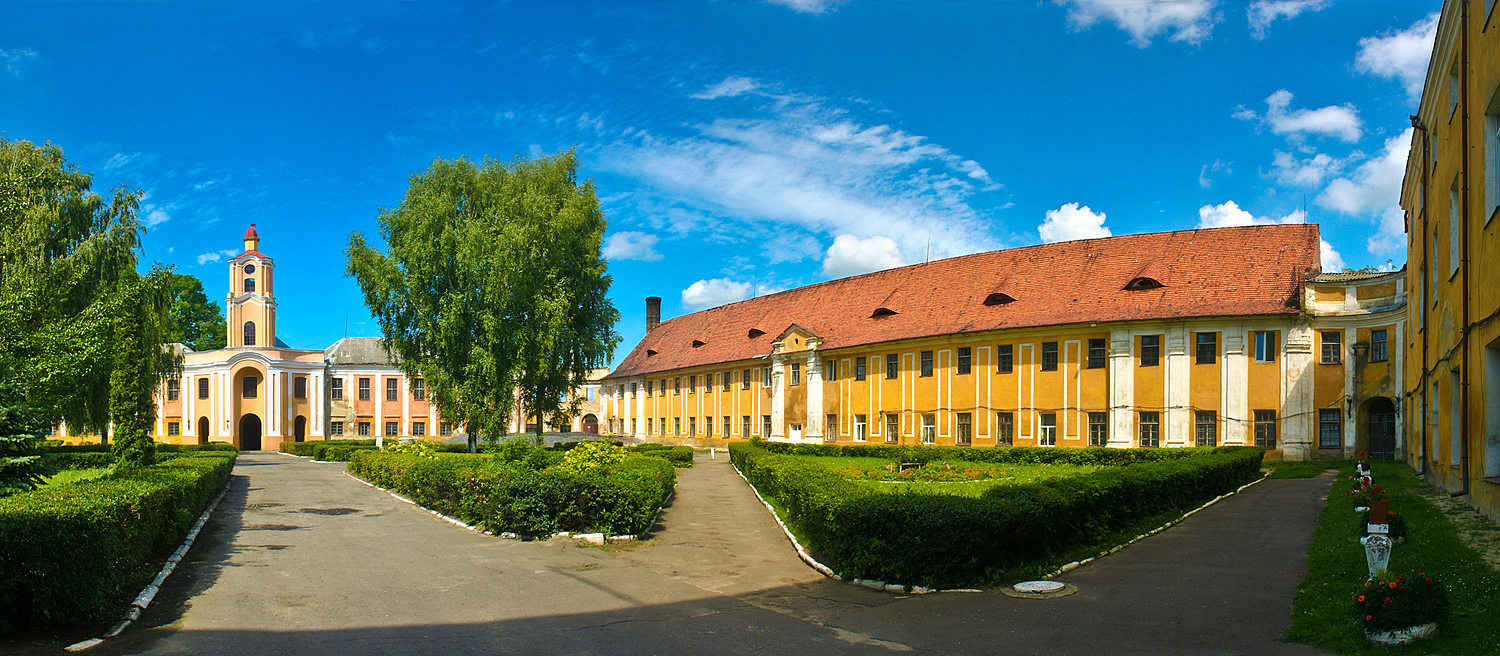
Castle courtyard

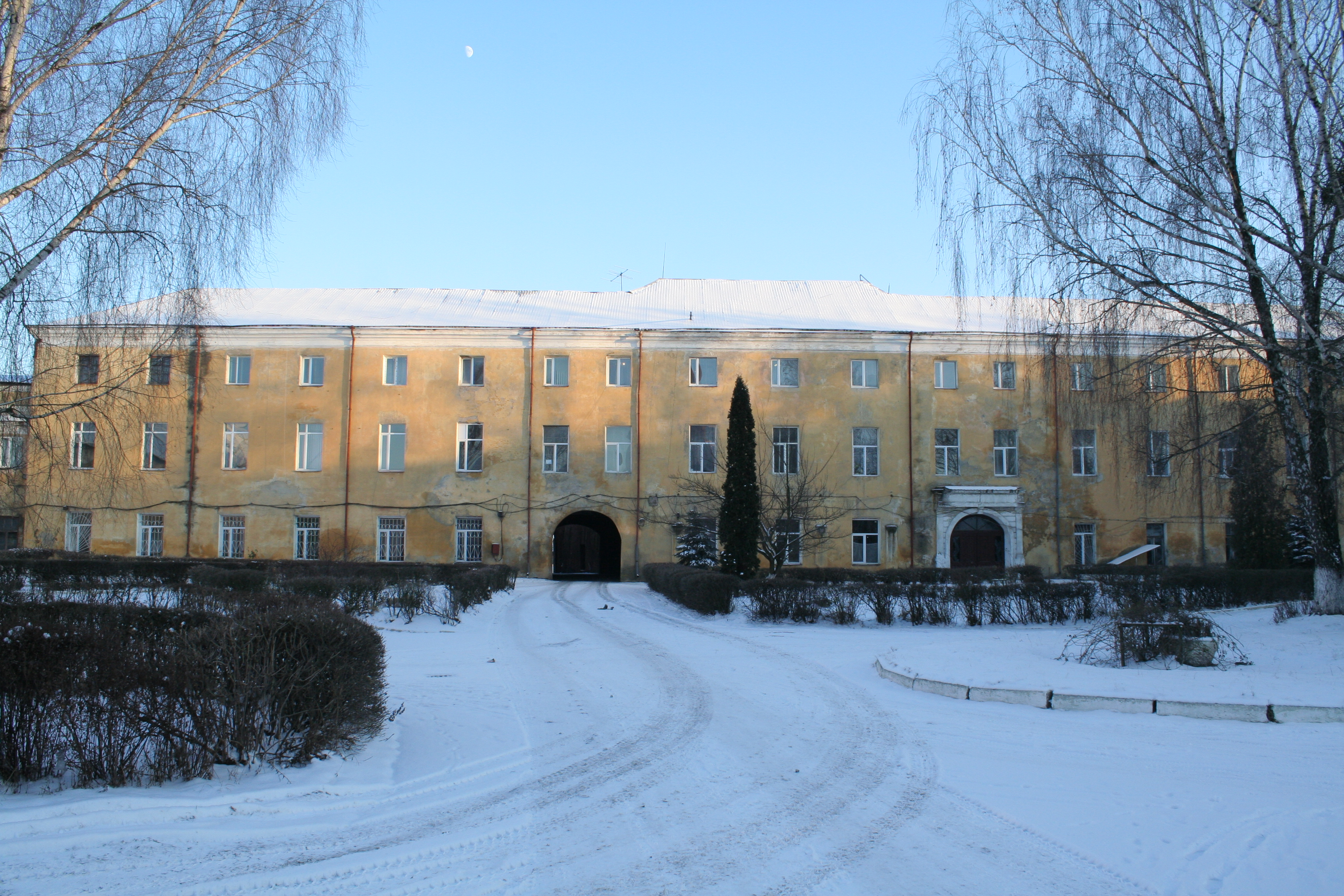
Olyka castle palace in winter

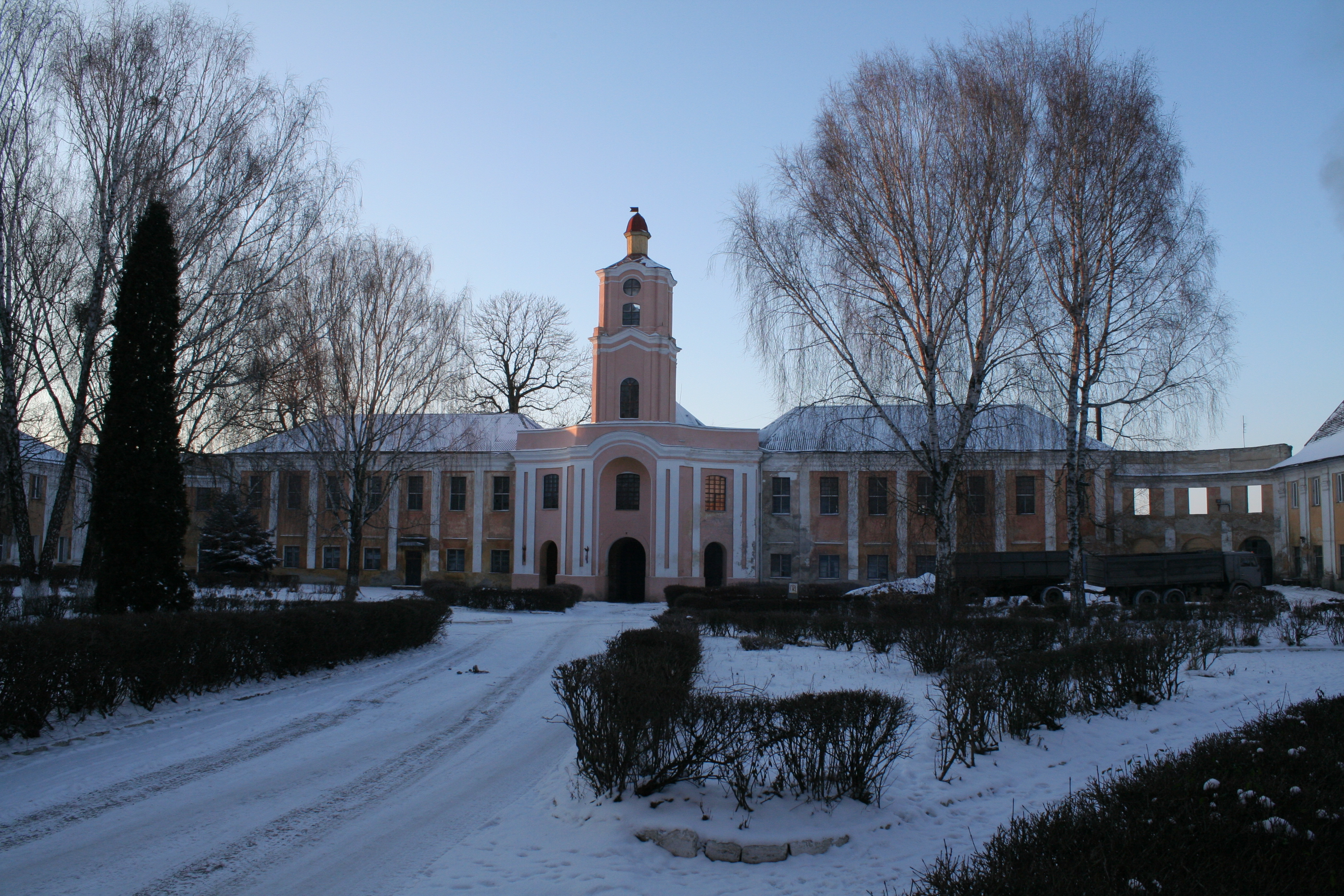
Olyka castle courtyard in winter

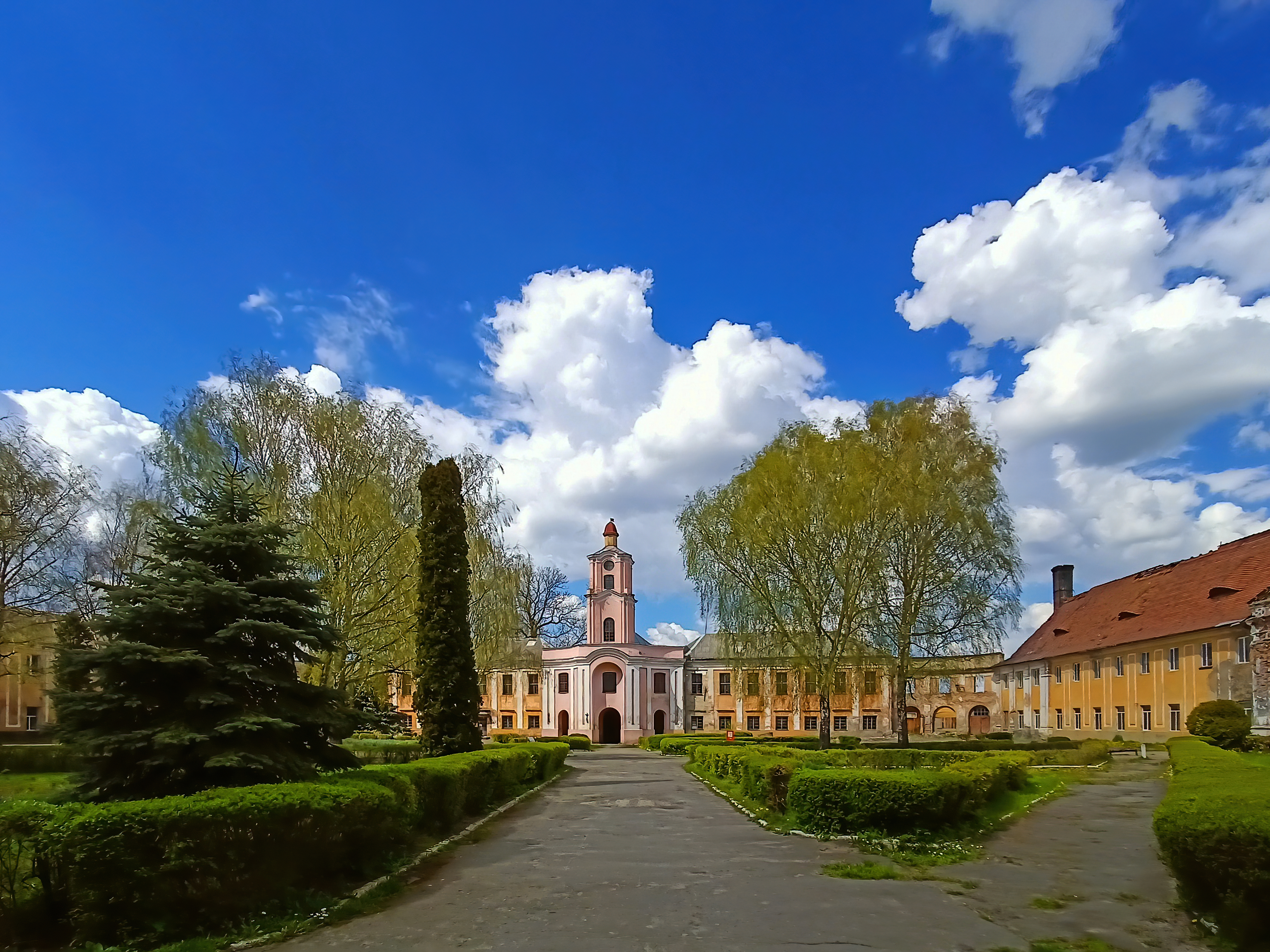
Olyka castle courtyard in summer

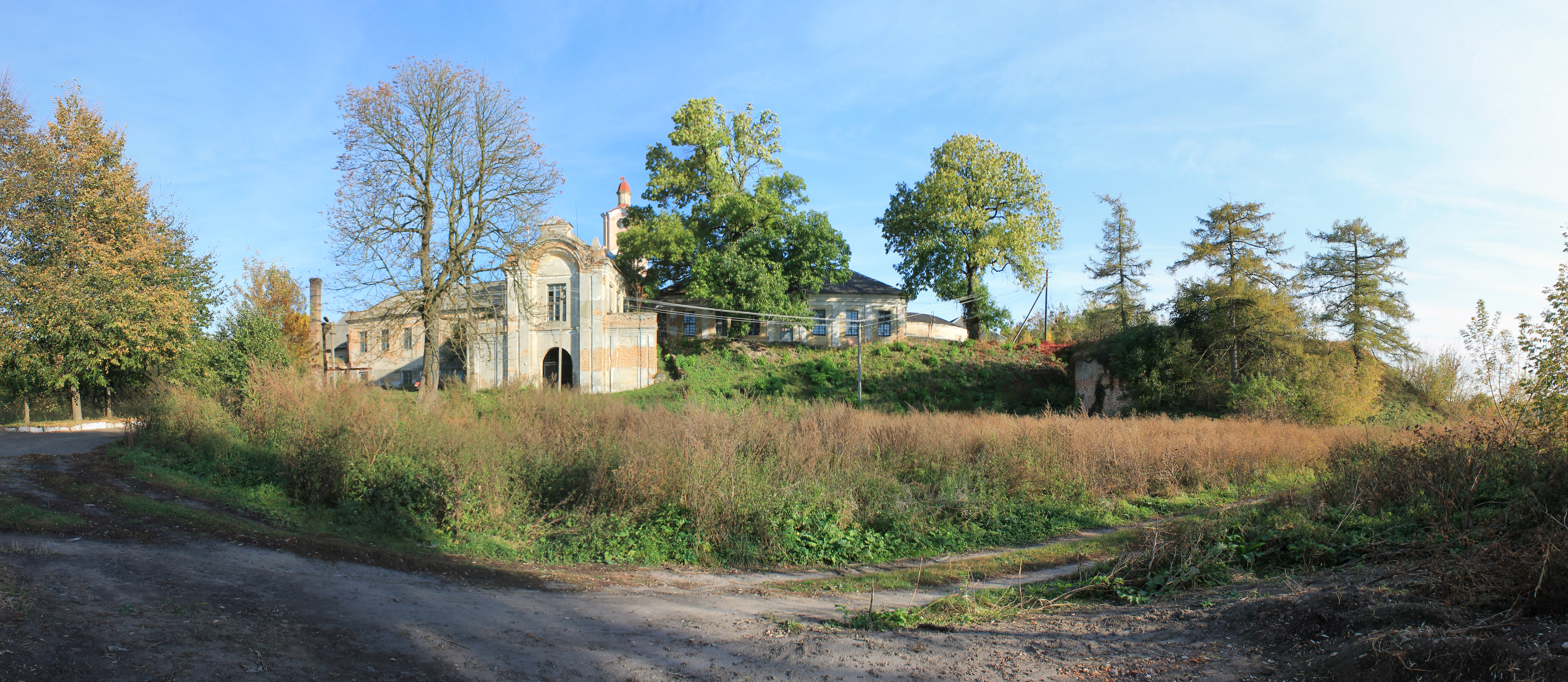
Entrance at the side of the clock-tower

=== 16th century: Foundation of Olyka Castle ===
Between two rivers among flood waters, Olyka castle was constructed by prince Mikołaj Radziwiłł (1515-1565), nicknamed 'the Black', between 1554 and 1564. Helping Mikołaj with the building was the fortifier Jan Frankenstein. When Mikołaj, the Olyka estate went to his youngest son, Stanisław Radziwiłł (1559-1599). After this, the seat remained in the hands of the Radziwiłł family, one of the most influential families in the Polish–Lithuanian Commonwealth. The castle became the main seat of one of the three family branches. The two other senior branches were based in Nesvizh and Kletsk.

Olyka castle was one of the first square bastion-type castles in the region. It is also one of the largest, with dimensions reaching approximately 100 times 120 meters. It served as a model for similar castles and fortified structures. Between 1591 and 1648, the castle was besieged various times, but it was not captured by the enemy troops.

=== 17th and 18th century ===
In 1640, prince Albrycht Stanisław Radziwiłł (1595-1656) constructed additional fortifications. A stone bridge replaced an old wooden bridge. The castle consisted of a large courtyard surrounded by various buildings: the south eastern wing being the main palace, with on the opposite side the north western wing, which had a two-storied clock-tower in baroque style. Both wings had two stories and were connected by an open arcade gallery. The castle had two richly decorated entrance gates, one on the side of the town and one opposite.

In the vicinity, prince Albrycht also constructed between 1635 and 1645 the magnificent Catholic collegiate church of the Holy Trinity in baroque style, an elaborate replica of Il Gesu in Rome. The church was ravaged by the Cossacks in 1648, but restored soon afterwards.

In 1702, during the Great Northern War, the village of Olyka was ransacked by Swedish soldiers, but the castle remained intact.

In the 18th century, Olyka castle lost its strategic importance due to changing tactics and innovations in military operations. Prince Michał Radziwiłł (1702-1762) turned the fortress in a magnificent baroque residence between 1737 and 1760. A third floor was added the palace, and an open gallery was placed in front. In addition, the palace received a baroque-style roof, and the interior was renovated, adding halls and rooms, which were aligned through an enfilade.

After the Second Partition of Poland in 1793, Olyka became part of the Russian Empire.

=== 19th century ===
In 1812, during Napoleon's invasion of Russia, Olyka castle lodged a Russian military hospital, which remained there until 1837. From 1840 onwards, no Radziwiłł family members lived there anymore. The castle was abandoned, decayed and its interior was destroyed – also partly due to fires.

In 1883, Ferdynand Radziwiłł (1834-1926) started restoration works, which lasted for thirty years. The repair and refurbishment works were led by the architect Zygmunt Gorgolewski, who also designed the Grand theatre of Lviv.

During the First World War, Olyka castle was severely damaged, and precious furnishing and equipment was stolen. The subsequent restoration was started under its last owner, Janusz Radziwiłł (1880–1967). Although, Janusz mainly staid at his palace in Warsaw or at Nieborów Palace, as he was closely involved in Polish politics as Olyka was now part of Second Polish Republic.

=== Second World War ===
At the start of the Second World War, Janusz Radziwiłł left Olyka to never return anymore. Nazi Germany occupied Poland, and Olyka castle was requisitioned by German forces. The castle became the site of the persecution of Ołyka Jews in the Holocaust. As part of the Einsatzgruppen action of August 1941, 720 Jews were murdered at the Olyka Castle and nearby. In July 1942, several hundred more Jews were killed in the castle. Memorials outside Olyka mark the place of execution of more than 4,000 Jews in Summer 1942 – in and around the Olyka ghetto, Radziwiłł Fortress, Olyka Castle, and surrounding areas. Israel's Holon Cemetery also has a memorial to the murdered Jews of Olyka and surrounding areas.

=== After 1945 ===
In 1945, Olyka was no longer in Poland, but had become part of the Soviet Union. Due to the war, the castle was again seriously damaged and destroyed. The palace and other structures were completely burnt, with roofs and ceilings collapsing. Only the walls and vaults over the first floors, along with fortified brick bastions, remained intact. A state-owned horse stud farm was located in some parts of the castle, and from the mid-1950s, restoration work started again. Reconstruction was completed in 1967, and the Castle became the Volyn Psychiatric Hospital.

In 1991, with the independence of Ukraine, Olyka changed statehood for the fourth time in the same century. The psychiatric hospital remained until July 2021, when it was transferred to the Volyn museum. The aim is now to restore the castle, first funds were received in October 2021. However, Olyka castle is already open for visitors.

== Architecture ==
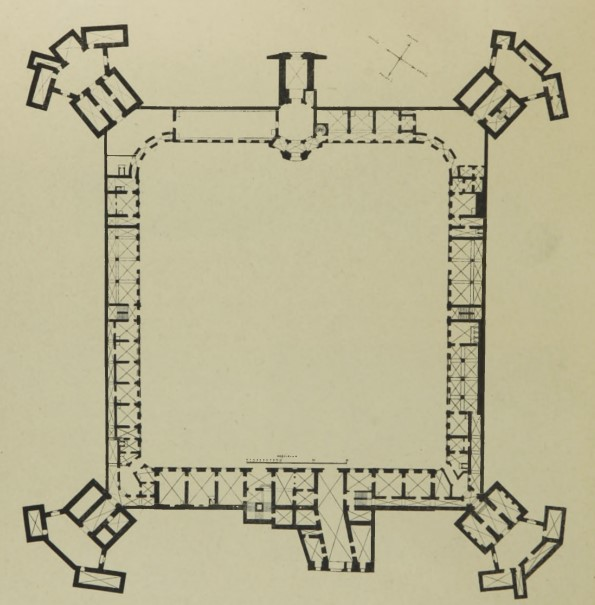
Plan of the ground floor by Stanislaw Tomkowicz (1922), note the two entrances opposite of each other

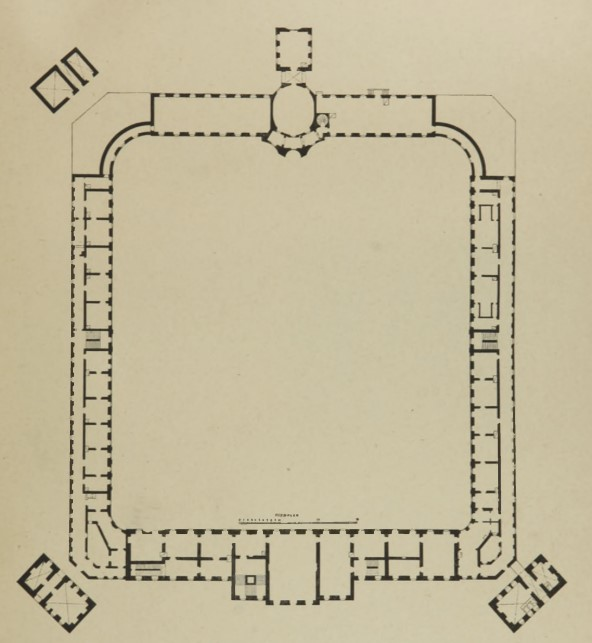
Plan of the Piano by Nobile Stanislaw Tomkowicz (1922), note the enfilade in the palace

The shape of Olyka castle is an almost regular square, formed by embankments with four corner bastions, on which watchtowers used to stand. Three sides of the castle are protected by a moat, stoned with bricks. The court-yard is surrounded by three two-storied buildings, and one three-storied building (the palace). There are two entrances to the castle, one in the south eastern wall, and the other in the north western. Over the north western gate rises the baroque clock tower.

The main palace of the castle is the south-eastern building. It is rectangular in plan, three-storied (it was originally one-story high, in the 17th century - two-storied), with two entrances. On the facade between these entrances, on the second floor, there was an Italian style balcony with a balustrade, which rested on the open arcaded gallery of the first floor. The gallery was covered with cross vaults. The internal layout is corridor-style with one-sided arrangement of rooms and an enfilade

The castle is a so-called 'Palazzo in Fortezza', a structure where a palace or noble residence is incorporated or built within a fortress of fortified complex. Other examples of such palaces are the Villa Farnese in Caprarola, Italy, Krzyżtopór castle and Łańcut Castle in Poland, and Pidhirtsi Castle in Ukraine. In addition, Olyka Castle has much in common with Biržai Castle in Lithuania, constructed by Kryzstof Radziwiłł, nicknamed 'the Lightning', as presumably, Birzai was modelled after Olyka castle.

The palace rooms once contained a large collection of art and furniture, including Radziwiłł family paintings, paintings depicting battle scenes and solemn events. But due to the devastation of the Second World War, nothing has remained.

== Literature ==
- Tomkowicz, Stanisław (1922). "Olyka". Prace Komisji Historii Kultury, Tom III, Zeszyt I (PDF) (in Polish). Kraków: Polska Akademia Umiejętności. pp. 1–37. Archived from the original (PDF) on 2023-11-05.
- Vechersky, Victor (2005). Castles and fortresses of Ukraine. Kiev: Baltija Druk. p. 79. ISBN 966-8137-17-5.
- Szczepanek, Zbigniew (2008). Zamki na Kresach - The Castles in the Former Eastern Borderlands of Poland (in Polish). Pelplin: Bernardinum. pp. 224–229. ISBN 978-83-7380-599-6.
- Zin, Barbara (2019). "On the European Cultural Heritage Route of Residence of the Radziwiłłs – Castle in Ołyka, Volhynia". Technical Transactions. 6: 107–118. doi:10.4467/2353737XCT.19.064.10617.
- Okonchenko, Olha (2020). "Architecture of Defensive Gates of Western Ukraine Castles in the 16th– 17th Centuries". IOP Conference Series: Materials Science and Engineering. 960 (2) 022104. Bibcode:2020MS&E..960b2104O. doi:10.1088/1757-899X/960/2/022104.

== Other Radziwiłł castles ==
- Lubcha Castle
- Mir Castle
- Nesvizh Castle
- Nieborów Palace
- Biržai Castle
- Dubingiai Castle

== Image gallery: Olyka Castle in historical pictures ==
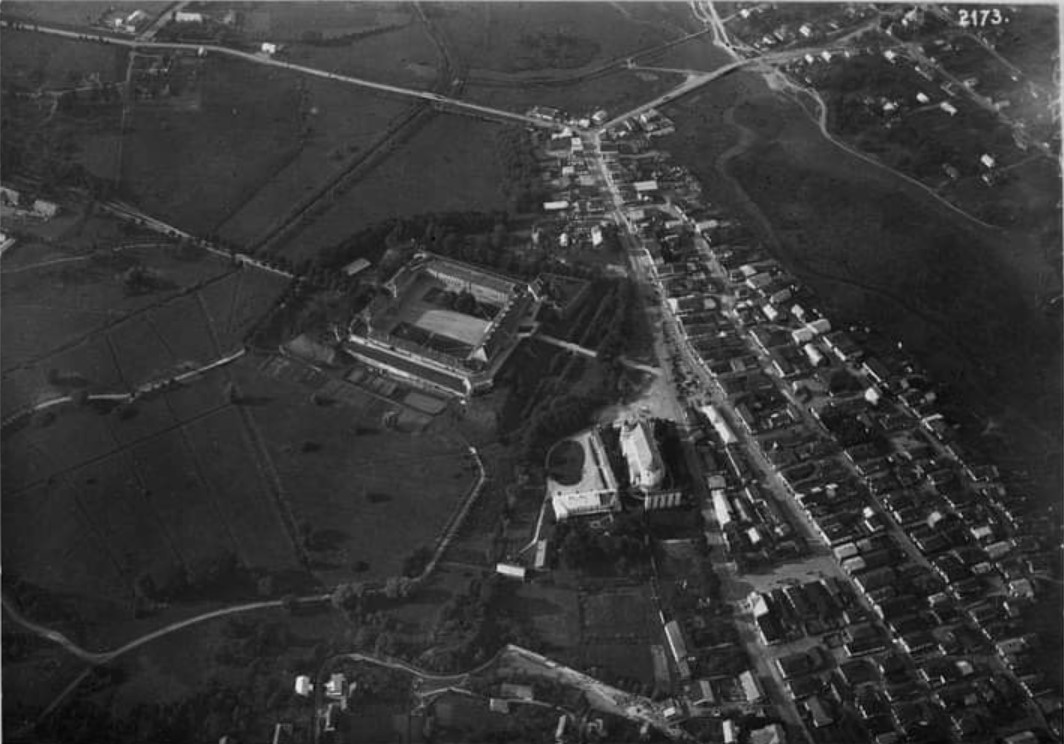
Olyka Castle from the air in 1920

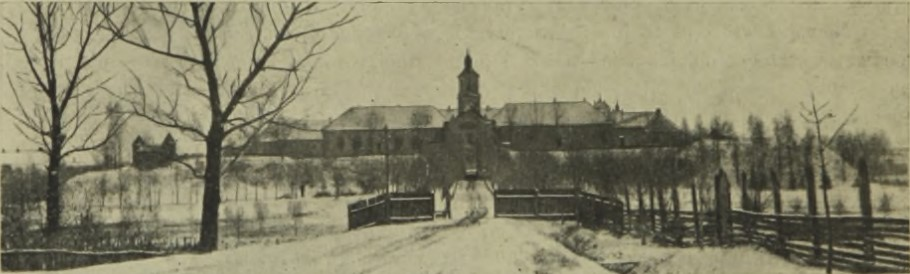
Castle entrance seen from the outside of the castle

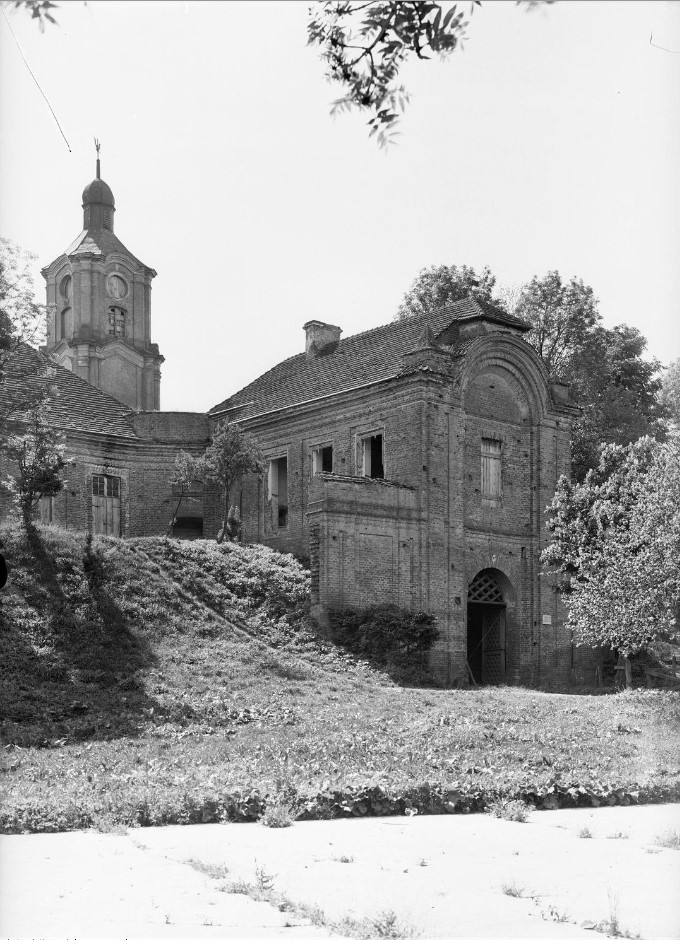
Castle entrance in 1925

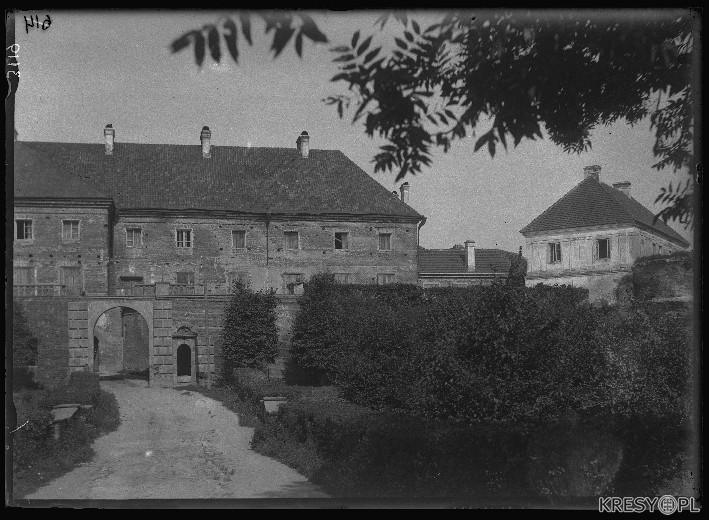
The opposite castle entrance (palace side) seen from the city

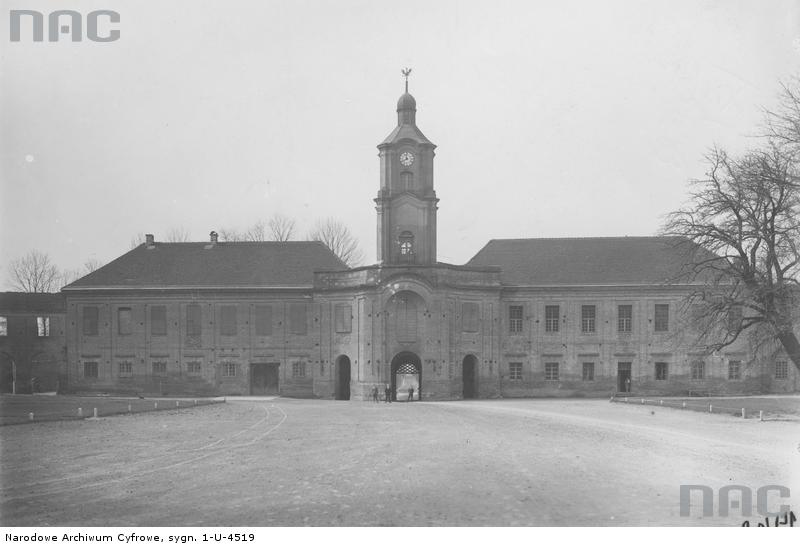
North western wing from the courtyard with the clock tower

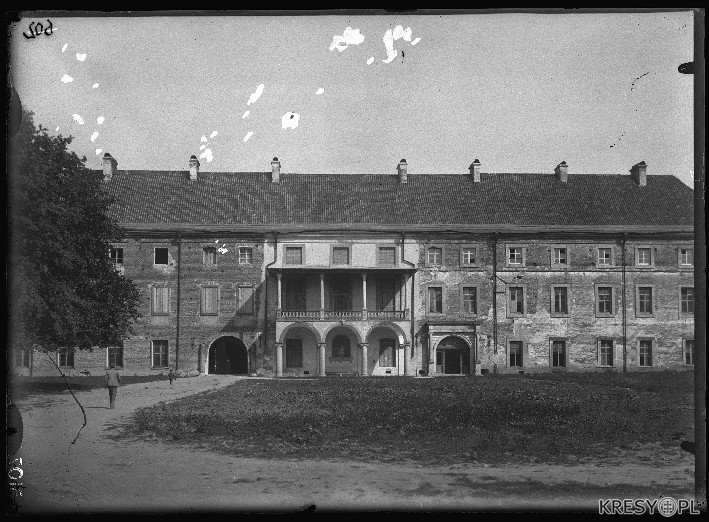
Olyka Castle palace

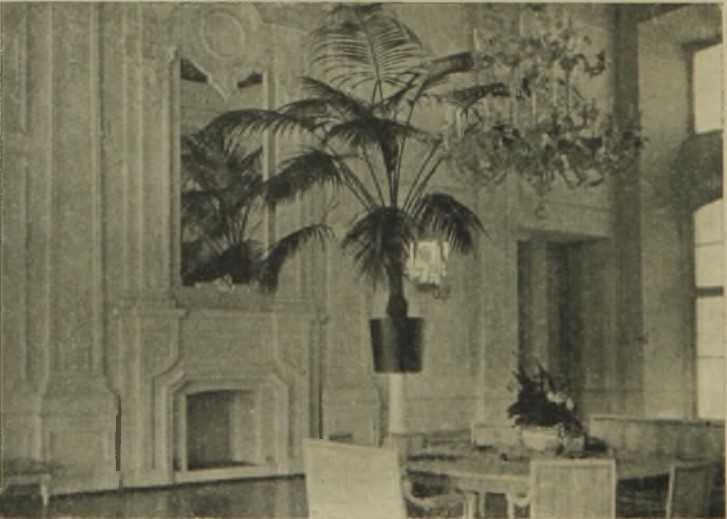
The large salon within the palace

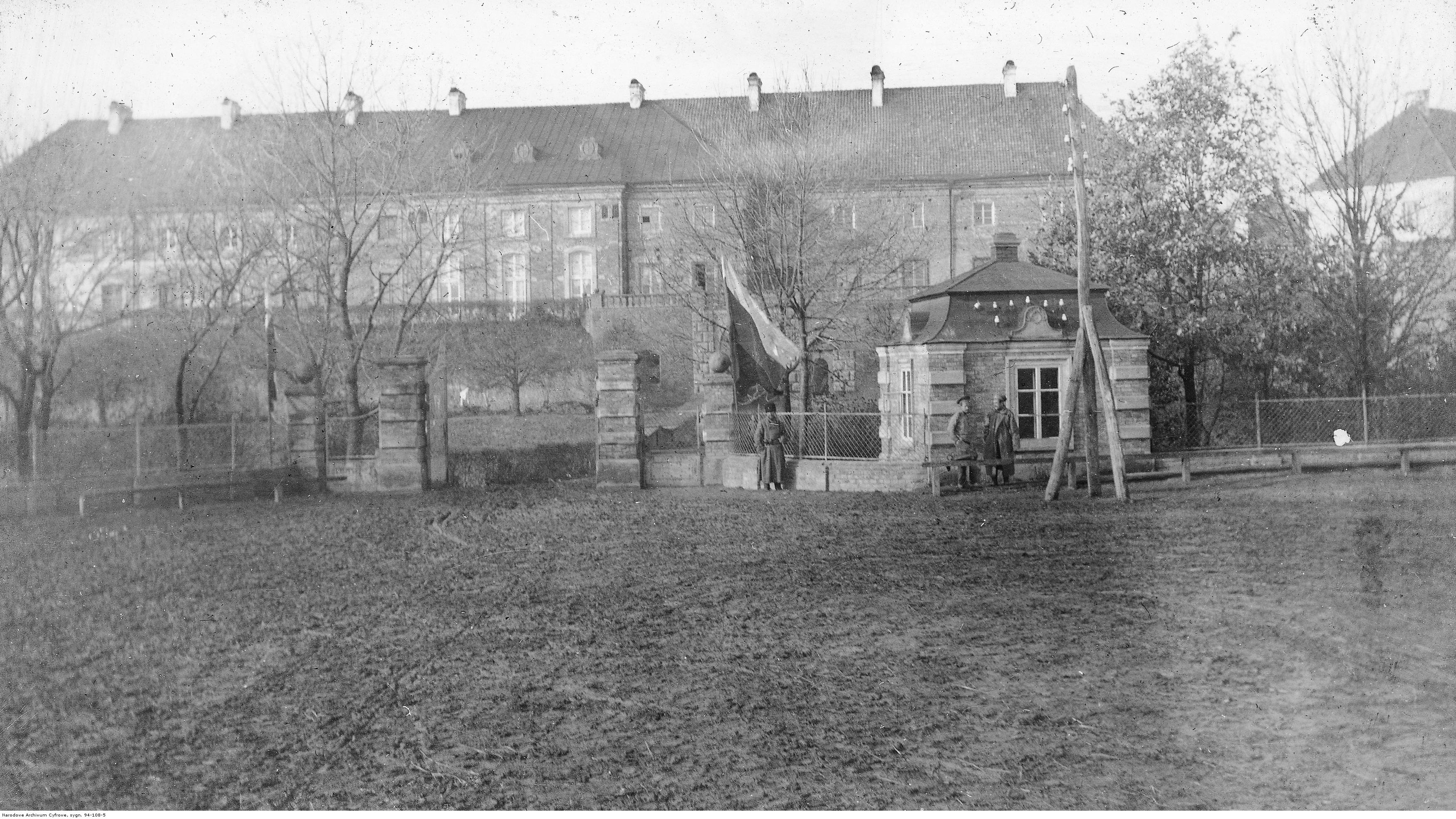
The palace seen from the city

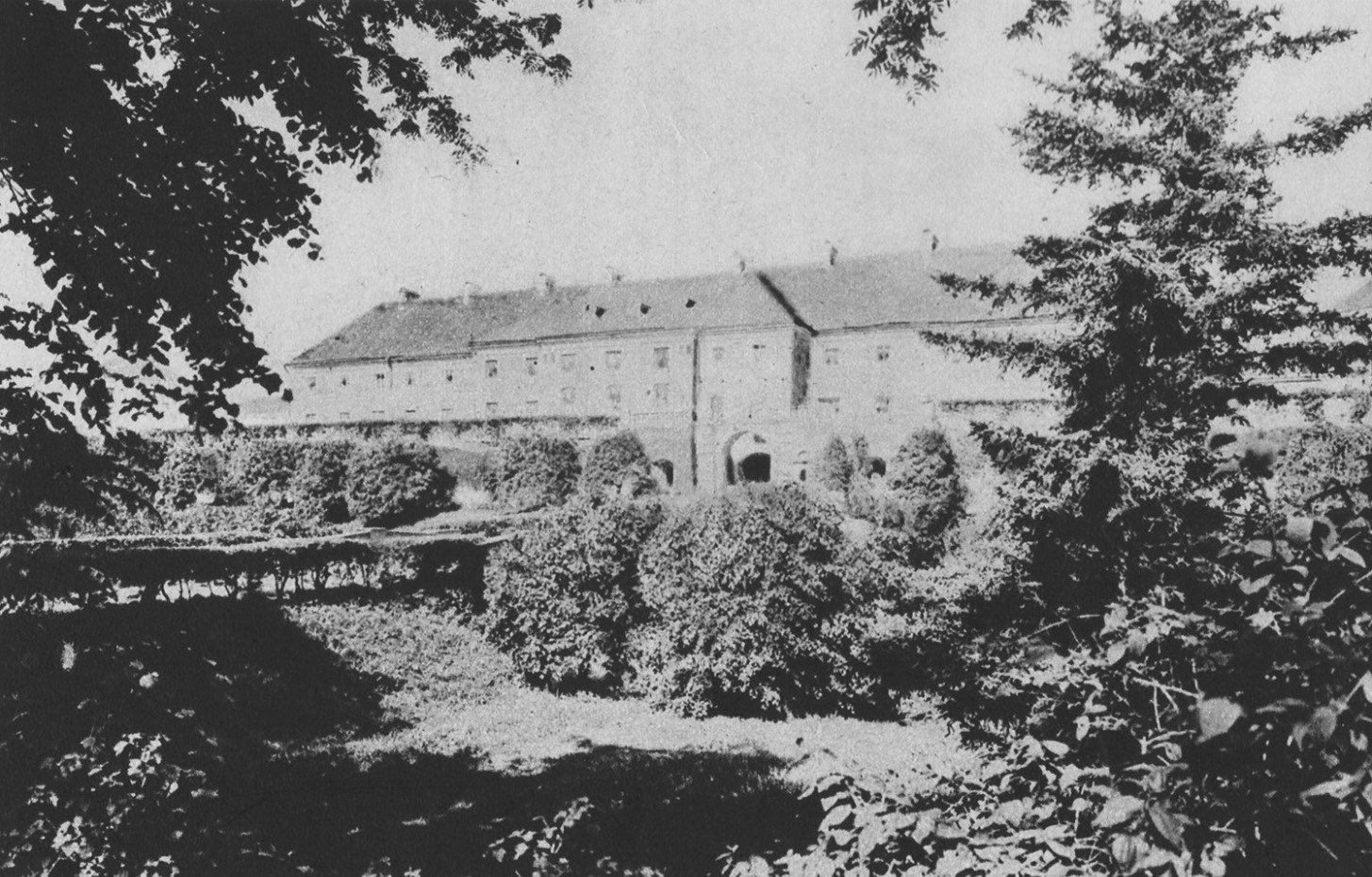
The palace in the 1920s

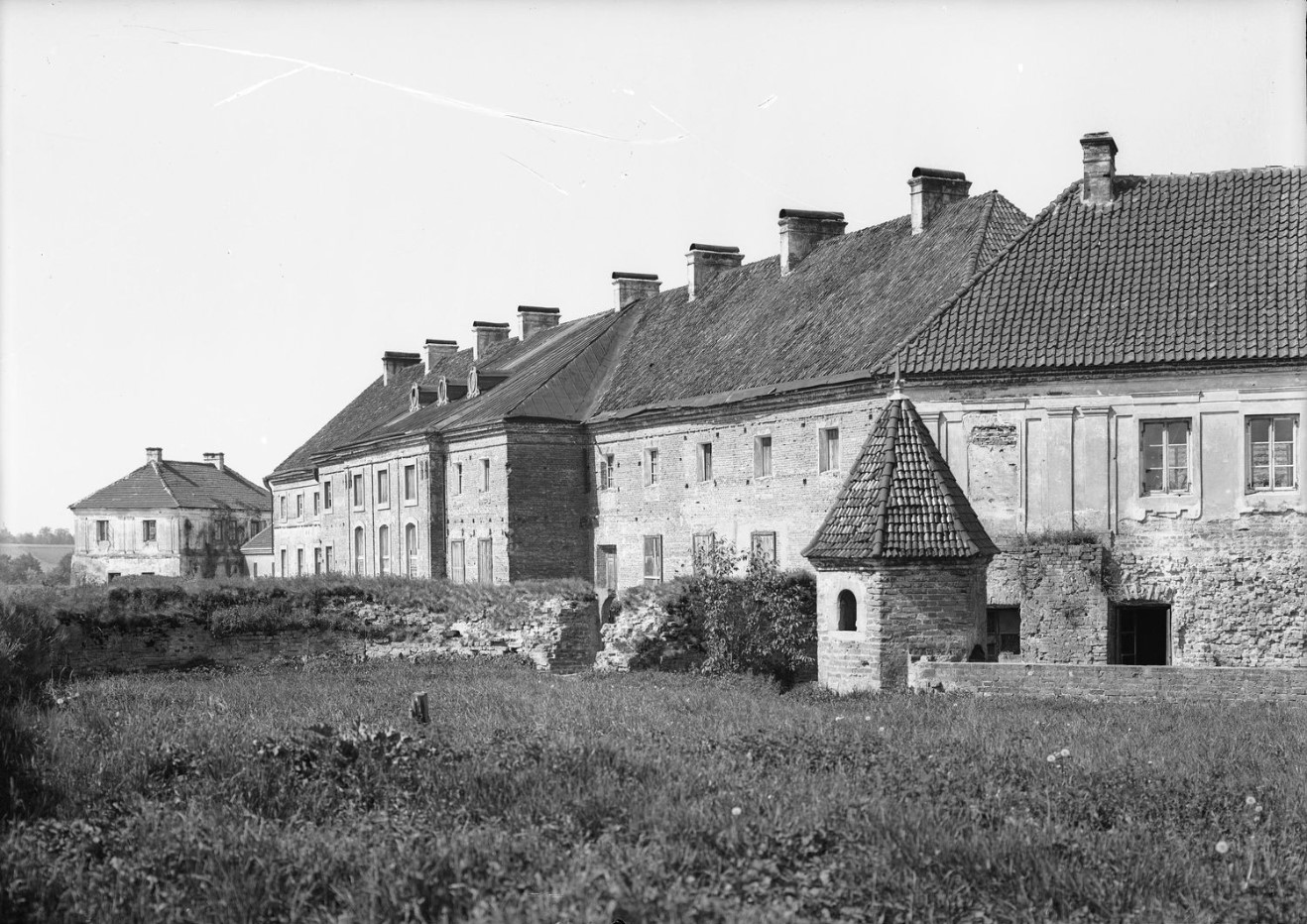
The palace seen from the ramparts

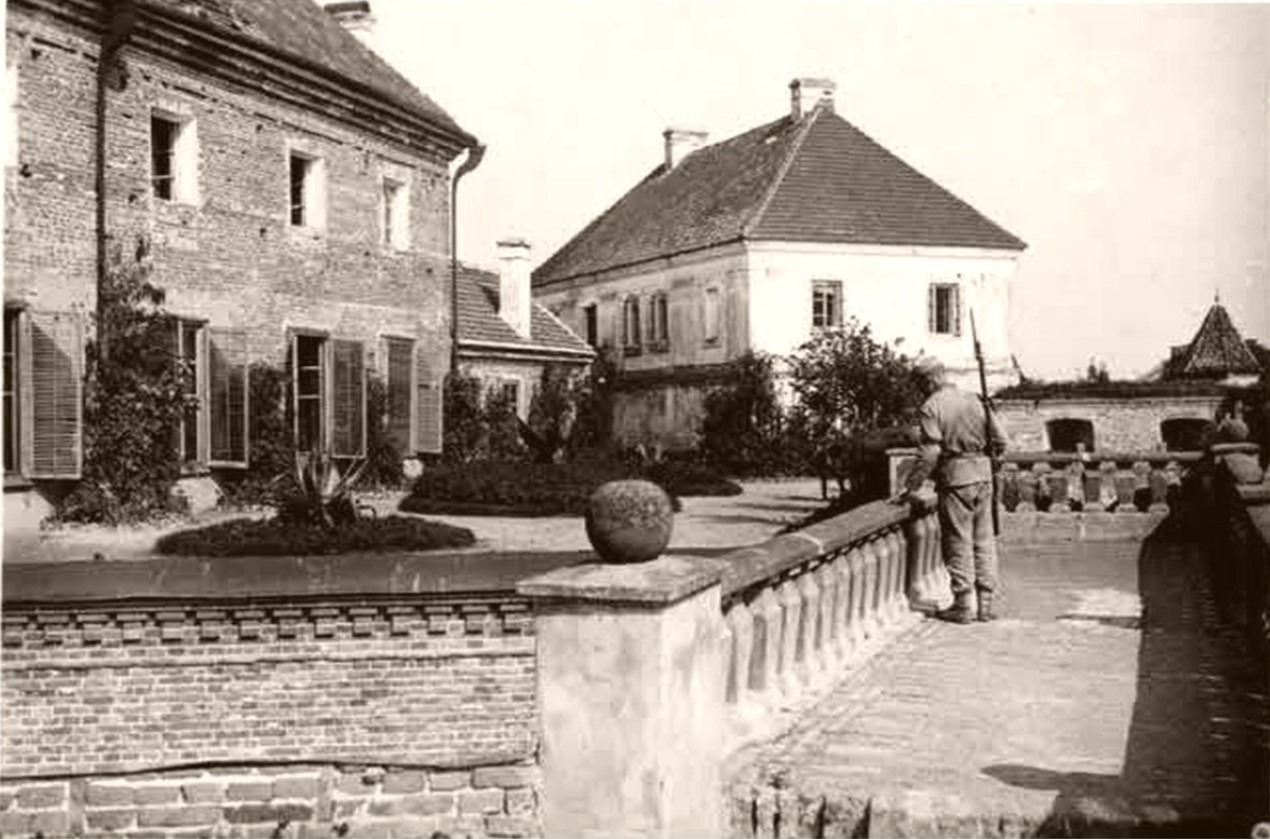
A soldier guarding the walls during the First World War

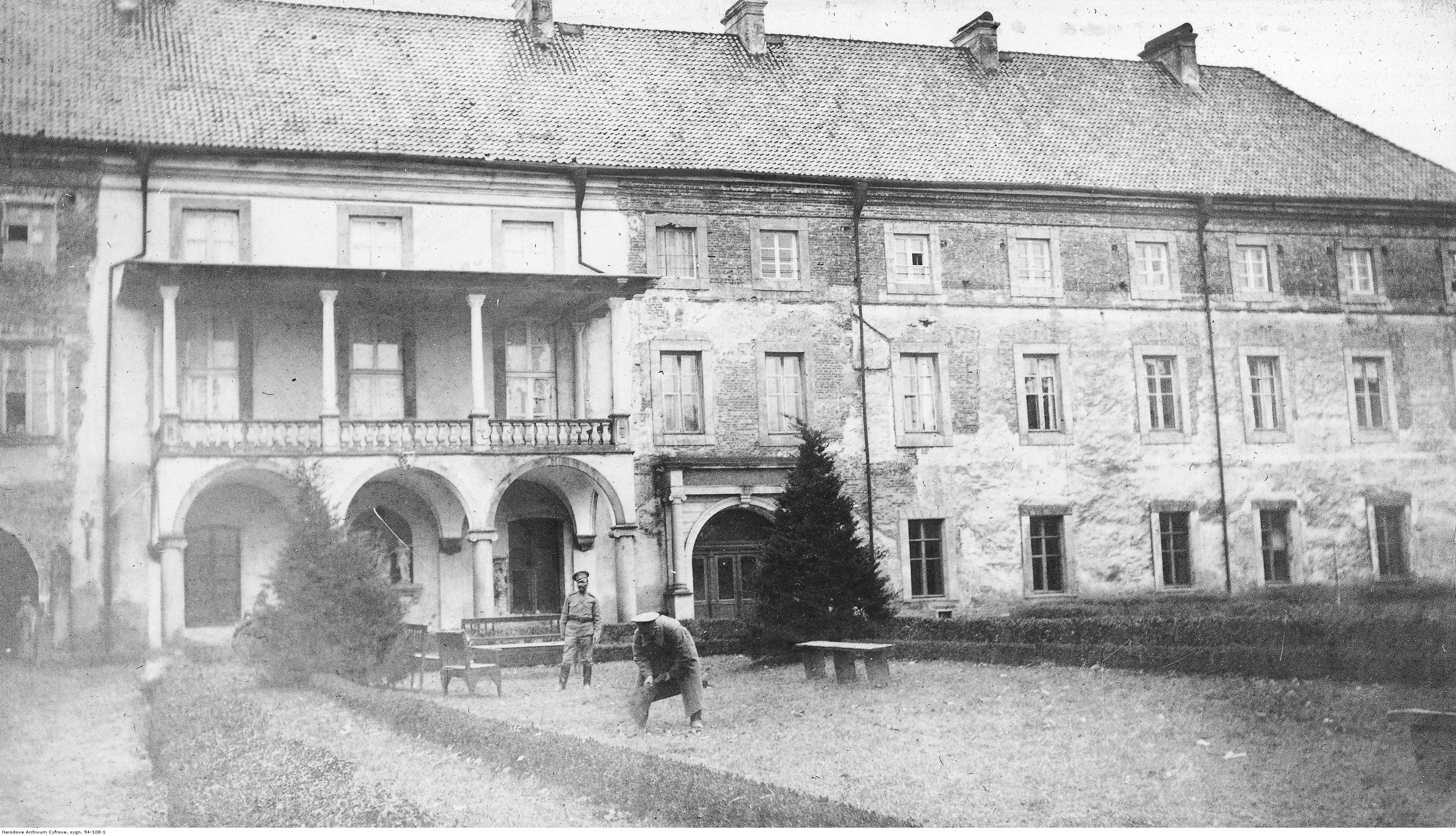
Soldiers in the courtyard

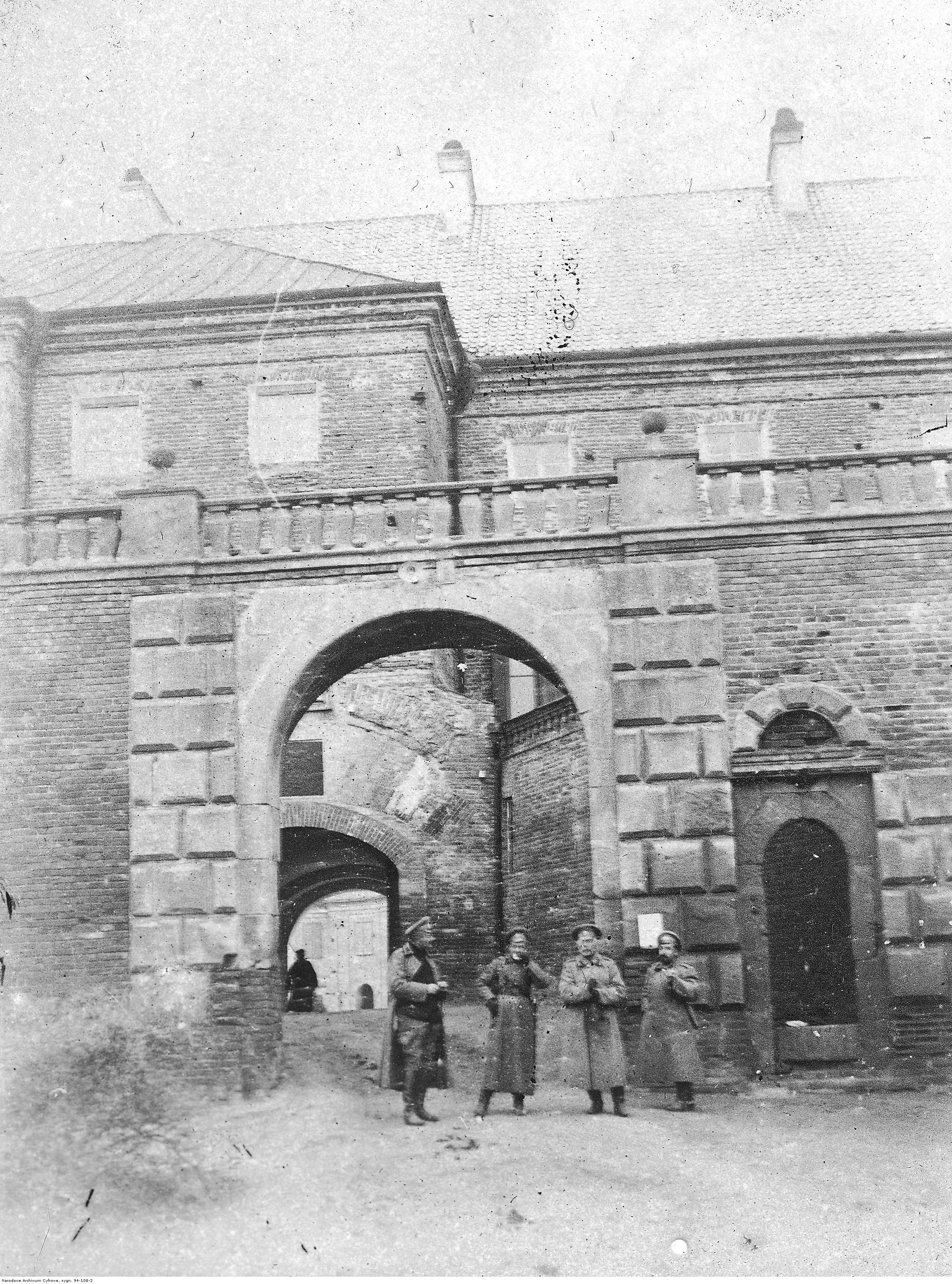
Soldiers outside the castle
