= Rozenkwit =

Rozenkwit is a very old Germanic family name whose origins date back to the eleventh century in the Lower Lorraine, the western area of the German Kingdom which bordered onto the Netherlands (County of Flanders).

== Origins ==
Its meaning derives from rozen (roses) and kwit (planter), and the name refers to the main occupation of the first Rozenkwits as rose farmers, a noble activity barely found in the dark Middle Ages in Europe. Flower trading was a very noble activity in the Duchy of Lower Lorraine, as well as in the Netherlands, as it still is today.

At that time, Godfrey of Bouillon was the Duke of Lower Lorraine. He had inherited this title through his famous mother, Saint Ida, and won the castle and the lands of Bouillon, properties that he had mortgaged with the Bishop of Liege, so that this financed his campaign in the Holy Land. However, there was a last obstacle to be overcome: the traditional Jewish lineage of Godfrey of Bouillon didn't pass unnoticed to the Church's eyes. In order to get the Pope's blessing, Bouillon promoted a true Christianisation wave for every territory under his domain, he himself being baptised over again by Pope Urban II.

As the Church placed increasing pressure and became more and more intolerant, the patronimial Hebrew names became “germanised”, and families started to adopt names derived from their occupations, places, colours, precious stones or metals, or plants. And so an old established family of prosperous rose farmers was registered as the “Rozenkwit” family, not by obligation but in order to help their mighty friend's aspirations. The Rozenkwit family could now count on Bouillon's eternal gratefulness, grace and everlasting friendship. With hindrances removed, Bouillon could take up his warlord role – and so the First Crusade officially began.

During the First Crusade, Godfrey was the commander-general and, with the final success in 1099, he was proclaimed King of Jerusalem. In the event, however, he preferred not to be referred to as king, taking the alternative title of “Defender of the Holy Sepulchre”.

== Fifteenth until twentieth century ==
In the middle of the fifteenth century, Rozenkwits became established in the city of Cologne, North Rhine-Westphalia. Its location at the intersection of the river Rhine with one of the largest commercial routes among western and eastern Europe contributed to the commercial importance of the city. Cologne was also a large ecclesiastical center and an important center of arts and learning.

In that cosmopolitan atmosphere the Rozenkwit family succeeded. The rose business had served the family well, but by now they were prosperous merchants with diversified businesses. They counted on an apparent tolerance by the clergy, which allowed them to preserve their roots. From the lineage of “Rozenkwit of Bouillon”, many generations sprang, prospering intellectually and financially. In the eighteenth century they were also producing and trading agricultural tools, distributed throughout northern Europe as far as Finland.

Until the beginning of the world war II there were records of "Rozenkwit" surname in the North Rhine-Westphalia region and in the province of Berlin.

Very close to German nobility and freemasonry, they became engaged in politics, which brought troubles to the family business. During a business trip to Moscow in the early 1900s, a German Rozenkwit from Stuttgart was falsely charged with “conspiracy against the Czar”. Forced to run away, he established himself in Olyka, East Prussia, under protection of the Radziwills.

World War II didn't bring better fortune to Rozenkwits than to their German-Jewish fellows, but a few family members succeeded in escaping from Nazi Germany and emigrated to America, counting again on German and Polish nobility for support. Some emigrated to Brazil as well.

== See also ==
- German family name etymology
