= Jan Kiszka =

Polish noble (1552–1592)

Coat of arms of Dąbrowa

Jan Kiszka (1552–1592) was a politician, magnate, patron, and benefactor of Polish Brethren in the 16th century Grand Duchy of Lithuania and the Polish–Lithuanian Commonwealth after its creation in 1569. Kiszka served as Carver of Lithuania from 1569, Royal Deputy Cup-bearer of Lithuania and Elder of Samogitia from 1579, castellan of Vilnius from 1588, voivode of Brest 1589. He was the builder of Lyubcha Castle in Belarus.

He was the son of Stanisław Kiszka (d. 1554). In 1575 he married Elizaveta Ostrogska. He was also a supporter of Radical Reformation.
