= Olyka urban hromada =

Olyka urban hromada Олицька міська громада
- Hromada
- Interactive map of Olyka urban hromada
- Country: Ukraine
- Oblast: Volyn
- Raion: Lutsk
- Admin. center: Olyka

Area
  - Total: 2,619 km^{2} (1,011 sq mi)

Population (2020)
  - Total: 11,835
  - Density: 4.519/km^{2} (11.70/sq mi)
- CATOTTG code: UA07080210000090779
- Settlements: 17
- Cities: 1
- Villages: 16
- Website: olytska-gromada.gov.ua

Olyka urban territorial hromada (Ukrainian: Олицька міська територіальна громада) is one of the hromadas of Ukraine, located in Lutsk Raion in Volyn Oblast. Its administrative centre is the city of Olyka.

The hromada has an area of 261.9 km^{2} (101.1 mi^{2}), as well as a population of 11,835 (as of 2020).

== Composition ==
In addition to one city (Olyka), the hromada contains 16 villages:

- Chemeryn
- Derno
- Didychi
- Horianivka
- Khromiakiv
- Kotiv
- Lychany
- Metelne
- Moshchanytsia
- Nosovychi
- Oderady
- Pokashchiv
- Putylivka
- Stavok
- Zalisoche
- Zhornyshche
