= Olyka =

City in Volyn Oblast, Ukraine

Olyka Олика
- City
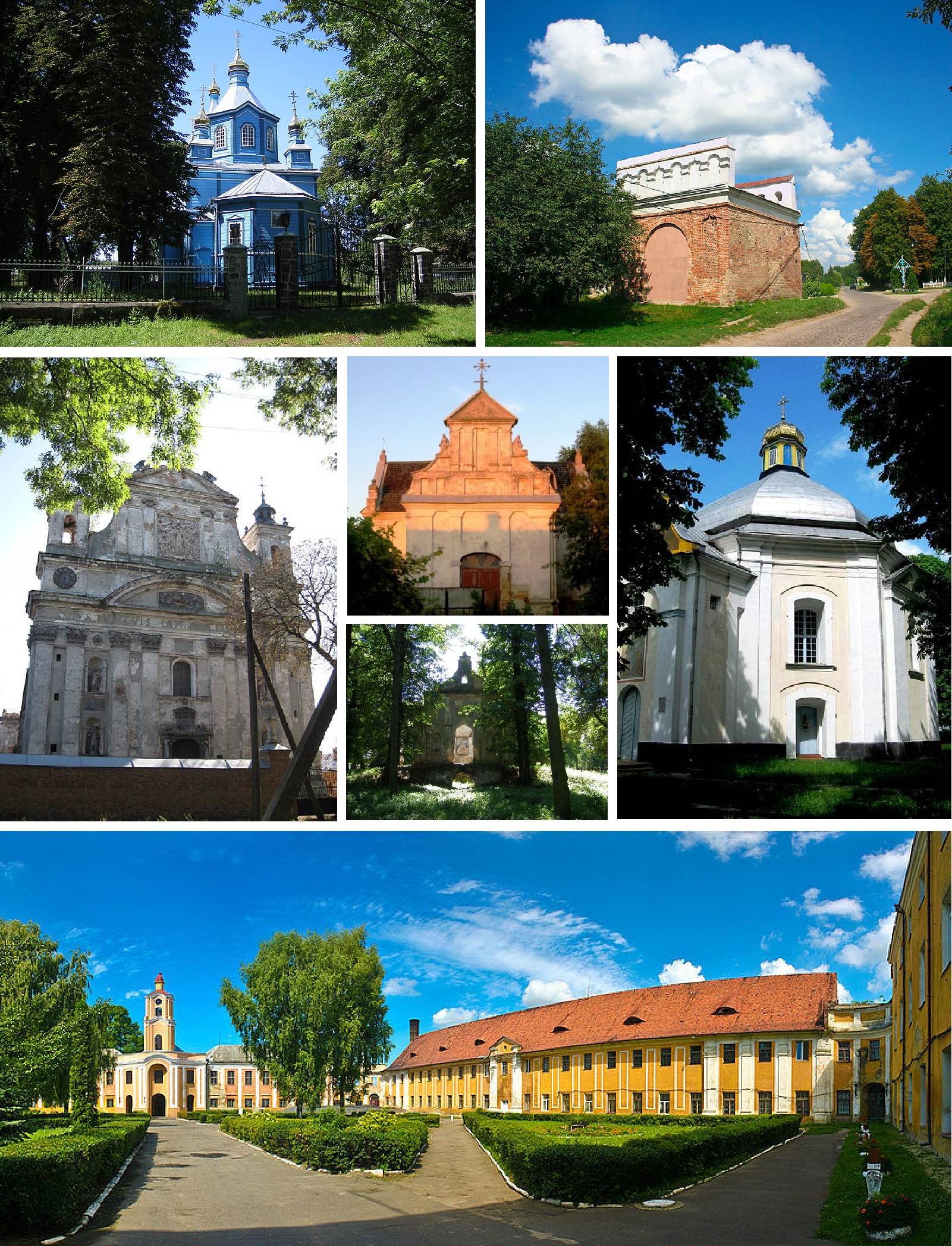
- Left to right, top to bottom: Orthodox Holy Trinity Church; Lutsk Gate; Catholic Collegiate Church of the Holy Trinity; Catholic Church of Saints Peter and Paul (top); Ruins of Catholic cemetery chapel (bottom); Orthodox Church of the Presentation of the Lord; Olyka Castle
- Interactive map of Olyka
- Location within Volyn Oblast Location within Ukraine
- Coordinates: 50°43′0″N 25°49′0″E
- Country: Ukraine
- Oblast: Volyn Oblast
- Raion: Lutsk Raion
- Hromada: Olyka urban hromada
- The first mention: 1149
- Magdeburg law: 1564

Area
  - Total: 491 km^{2} (190 sq mi)

Population (2022)
  - Total: 3,032
  - Density: 637/km^{2} (1,650/sq mi)
- Time zone: UTC+2 (EET)
  - Summer (DST): UTC+3 (EEST)
- Postal code: 45263
- Area code: +380 3365

Olyka (Ukrainian: Олика, IPA: [oˈlɪkɐ]; Polish: Ołyka; Yiddish: אליק, romanized: Olik) is a city in Lutsk Raion, Volyn Oblast, western Ukraine. It is located east of Lutsk on the Putylivka Rriver. Its population is 3,032 (2022 estimate).

== History ==
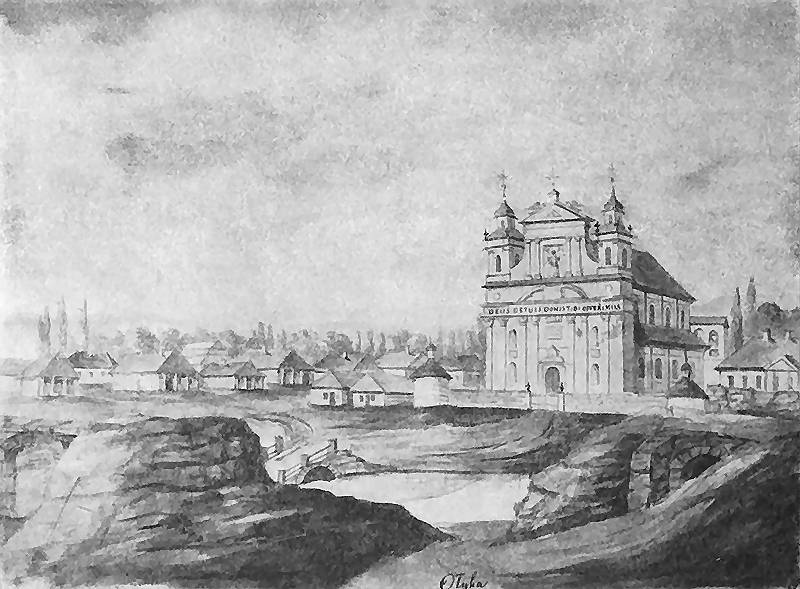
Olyka, watercolor by Napoleon Orda (1874)

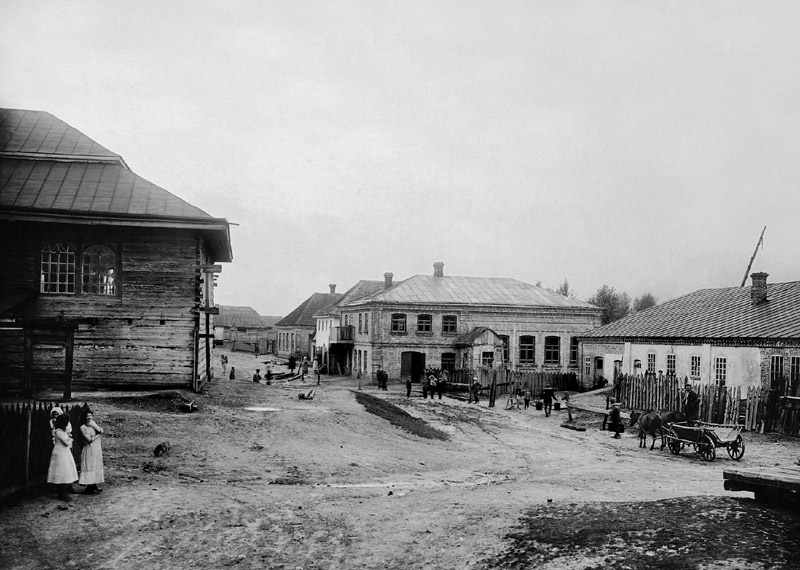
Street in Olyka (1912–1914)

Olyka was founded in the early Middle Ages as one of the villages belonging to the Kievan Rus'. It was first mentioned in 1149 in the Hypatian Chronicle. In the 14th century it was conquered by Grand Duchy of Lithuania.

Under the Grand Duchy of Lithuania, the village grew rapidly and became a centre of local magnates, initially the family of Kiška and, after 1533, the Radziwills. In 1548 Mikolaj Radziwill the Black became Duke of Olyka. In 1569, Olyka became part of Poland after the Union of Lublin.

In the second half of the 16th century, during the Protestant Reformation, the town became one of the most important centres of Calvinism in the Polish–Lithuanian Commonwealth. Its growth was halted by the Khmelnytsky Uprising of 1648, during which the town was captured by Cossacks, plundered and burnt. However, it was soon rebuilt and in 1654 it received city rights. As the main seat of one of the branches of the influential Radziwill family, Olyka became one of the most important political and trade centres of all of Volhynia.

In the Third Partition of Poland (1795), the town was annexed by the Russian Empire and became part of the Volhynian Governorate. In the 19th century, it continued to play a role as a centre of wood and grain trade. During World War I in 1915 and 1916, the area was a scene of heavy fighting between the forces of Russia and Austria-Hungary. After the Polish-Bolshevik War, the town was restored to Poland as part of Wołyń Voivodeship, and the local palace was refurbished.

Following the invasion of Poland of 1939 and the Nazi-Soviet Alliance, the town was occupied by Soviet Union forces. After Operation Barbarossa, when Germany attacked the Soviet Union, the German occupation started and lasted until 1944. Olyka was attacked and deeply damaged by Organization of Ukrainian Nationalists (OUN) forces.

After World War II the area was annexed by the Soviet Union and incorporated into the Ukrainian SSR. Since 1991 it is a part of independent Ukraine.

Until 26 January 2024, Olyka was designated urban-type settlement. On this day, a new law entered into force which abolished this status, and Olyka became a rural settlement.

On 23 April 2025, the Verkhovna Rada of Ukraine officially granted the rural settlement of Olyka the status of a city.

== Olyka Academy ==
Between 1637 and 1774 a branch of Zamoyski Academy functioned in Olyka, making it an important educational centre in Volhynia. Created by prince Albrycht Stanisław Radziwiłł on the base of a previously existing school, the establishment received official recognition from the Polish king.

== Notable landmarks ==
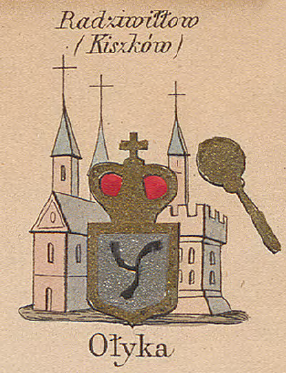
Depiction of Olyka Castle and the coat of arms of its owners on a 19th-century map

- Olyka Castle (surrounded by Radziwill Fortress) – late 16th century, expanded in the mid-18th century, damaged after 1945, restored after 1990
- The Calvinist Church, converted in 1580 to a Catholic church of the Holy Trinity, and from 1592 dedicated to Apostles Peter and Paul
- Roman Catholic Collegiate Church of the Holy Trinity (1635–1645)
- The Lutsk Gate of the city (1630s)
- Orthodox Christian Church of the Presentation in the Temple (1784)
- Orthodox Christian Church of the Holy Trinity (1886)

== Other Radziwill estates ==
- Dubingiai
- Kėdainiai
- Biržai Castle
- Mir Castle
- Niasvizh Castle

== Jewish presence ==
=== Pre-World War II ===
Jewish presence in Olyka dates back to the 16th century, and in the late 17th century the Jewish community became one of the largest in the Volhyn Region.

After the Cossack Chmielnicki Uprising of 1648, 20 out of 30 Jewish households survived. It was believed that the prayer by Rabbi David HaLevi Segal miraculously saved the Jewish and non-Jewish citizens of Olyka from the Cossacks' assault of 1651.

Olyka was the cradle of the Olyker Hasidic dynasty that was founded by the famous Rabbi Hersh Leib Landa the first Olyker rebbe. He was followed by his son Rabbi Yosef (Yoseph) Dovid, who was followed by his son Rabbi Mordechai (he authored a book called Gedulas Mordechai). He was followed by his son Rabbi Shimon Shloima (he authored a book called Shekel Hakodesh, and was father-in-law of Rabbi Yochanan Perlow of the Karliner Dynasty), who was followed by his son Rabbi Alter Yosef (Yoseph) Dovid.

In 1897 a total of 2,606 people – 50 percent of the total Olyka population – were Jews, and that amount increased when many Jewish refugees from nearby towns fled to Olyka during World War I. According to the 1921 census, the number of Jews living in Olyka had decreased to 2,086 individuals.

=== The Holocaust ===
Monument outside Olyka commemorating over 4,000 Jews massacred during Holocaust in 1942

Olyka's large Jewish community was completely destroyed during the Holocaust, including Nazi persecutions at the site of the Radziwill Fortress/Olyka Castle. It is an important place of Jewish memory. Rabbi Alter Yosef Dovid Landa and his family perished.

Following the September 1939 Ribbentrop-Molotov Pact and German-Soviet Occupation of Poland, many Jewish refugees from central and western Poland settled in Olyka in the fall of 1939, as did 60 Jewish refugees from Czechoslovakia. Jewish organizations and institutions were forced to disband. After the German invasion of Ukraine in June 1941, as part of Operation Barbarossa, the German 6th Army entered Olyka, destroyed houses, killed 100 Jews, and kept the remaining Jews in an open ghetto. Around 150 Jews evacuated eastward; most Jews stayed in the ghetto. Jews and non-Jewish Ukrainians continued to trade goods and food in and around the ghetto; for example, an Olyka ghetto Jew traded his house for sixteen kilograms of rye due to famine. As part of the Einsatzgruppen Aktion of August 1941, 720 Jews, including Rabbi Alter Yosef Dovid Landa, were killed at the Olyka Castle and at the town's Jewish cemetery towards Czemeryn.

In March 1942, Jews from surrounding villages were brought into Olyka, and a closed ghetto was created with barbed-wire fence to imprison those inside. More than 4,000 Jews were shot to death by Nazi and Ukrainian forces in the summer of 1942, in and around the Olyka ghetto, Radziwill Fortress, Olyka Castle, and surrounding areas. Monuments outside Olyka commemorate this massacre. The mass grave is located on the road to Zhornische (Żorniszcze).

Accounts vary as to the total number of Jews in and around Olyka who had died by the time the Olyka ghetto was liquidated in July/August 1942. Given the circumstances of Nazi massacres, it has been difficult to accurately count the dead. Most reports state the total amounted to 5,220 to 5,673 Jews. In early 1943, 130 remaining Jewish artisans remaining in the ghetto were shot to death. Although Olyka's Great Synagogue was intact after the summer 1942 ghetto liquidation, it was destroyed by war's end. Israel's Holon Cemetery has a monument in memory of those Jews of Olyka and its surroundings, who were murdered in the Holocaust.

Fewer than 30 Jews escaped to the forest in the summer of 1942. Of those survivors, 23 men created a partisan unit with 30 Jews already outside the village. They joined the underground resistance in the region against the Nazis, and a small number survived after early 1943.

== Population ==
Historical population
Year	Pop.	±%
1959	3,905	—
1970	3,965	+1.5%
1979	4,199	+5.9%
1989	3,741	−10.9%
2001	3,255	−13.0%
2010	3,141	−3.5%
2014	3,138	−0.1%
2017	3,083	−1.8%
Source: Census data

According to the last census from 2001, there were 3,255 people living in Olyka. It is estimated 3,083 people lived there as of 2017.

== Climate ==
The climate in Olyka is cold and temperate, with significant rainfall that occurs mostly in July.

Climate data for Olyka, Ukraine
Month	Jan	Feb	Mar	Apr	May	Jun	Jul	Aug	Sep	Oct	Nov	Dec	Year
Mean daily maximum °C (°F)	−2.2 (28.0)	−1.2 (29.8)	3.5 (38.3)	12.4 (54.3)	19 (66)	22.7 (72.9)	23.9 (75.0)	23 (73)	18.3 (64.9)	12.1 (53.8)	5.2 (41.4)	0.1 (32.2)	11.4 (52.5)
Mean daily minimum °C (°F)	−8.1 (17.4)	−7.3 (18.9)	−3.7 (25.3)	2.7 (36.9)	8.1 (46.6)	12 (54)	13.3 (55.9)	12.2 (54.0)	8.3 (46.9)	3.8 (38.8)	0 (32)	−4.8 (23.4)	3.0 (37.5)
Average precipitation mm (inches)	31 (1.2)	30 (1.2)	26 (1.0)	37 (1.5)	58 (2.3)	71 (2.8)	80 (3.1)	66 (2.6)	53 (2.1)	39 (1.5)	39 (1.5)	38 (1.5)	568 (22.3)
Source: Climate-Data

== Notable people ==
- Janusz Chodnikiewicz (born 1936), film director and producer
- Henry Orenstein (born c. 1923), toymaker, poker player, author, and entrepreneur (resided in Olyka 1939–1941)
- Albrycht Stanisław Radziwiłł (1595–1656), Polish–Lithuanian Commonwealth politician, Lithuanian chancellor
- Michał Kazimierz "Rybeńko" Radziwiłł (1702–1762), equestrian, hetman, starost
