= Nesvizh Castle =

Castle in Niasviž, Belarus

UNESCO World Heritage Site
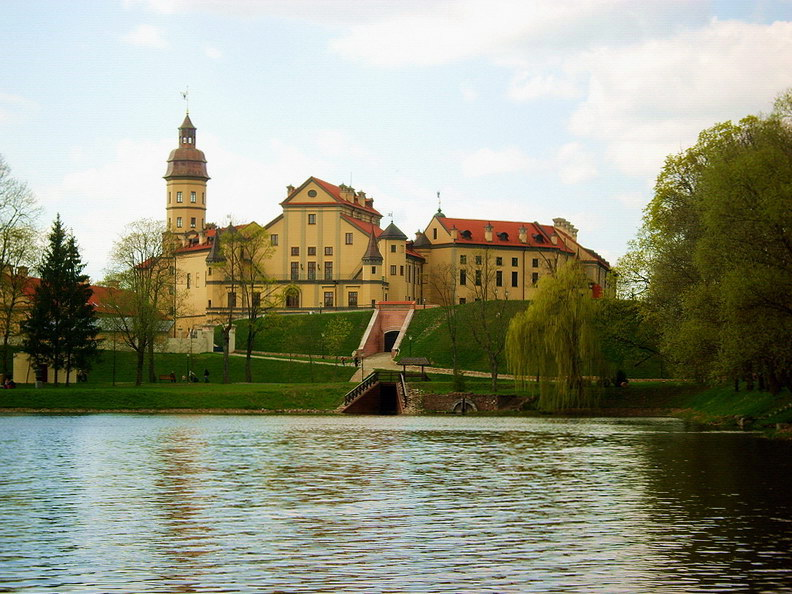
- View from the lake

- Location within Belarus
- Location: Nyasvizh, Minsk Region, Belarus
- Part of: Architectural, Residential and Cultural Complex of the Radziwill Family at Nesvizh
- Criteria: Cultural: (ii)(iv)(vi)
- Reference: 1196
- Inscription: 2005 (29th Session)
- Website: niasvizh.by/en/
- Coordinates: 53°13′22″N 26°41′29″E

Nesvizh Castle or Nyasvizh Castle (Note: Belarusian: Нясвіжскі замак, romanized: Niasvižski zamak; Russian: Несвижский замок, romanized: Nesvizhskiy zamok; Lithuanian: Nesvyžiaus pilis; Polish: zamek w Nieświeżu.) is a residential castle of the Radziwiłł family in Nyasvizh (Nesvizh), Belarus. It is 183 metres (600 ft) above sea level. Built originally in the 16th and 17th centuries, throughout its history the site has been sacked, damaged and abandoned repeatedly, and has seen multiple different uses including as a storehouse. Finally it has been extensively rebuilt and restored from 2004–2012. In 2005, the castle, church, and surrounding environment were inscribed on the UNESCO World Heritage List. The castle and the nearby Corpus Christi Church were instrumental in the development of Central European and Russian architecture.

== History ==
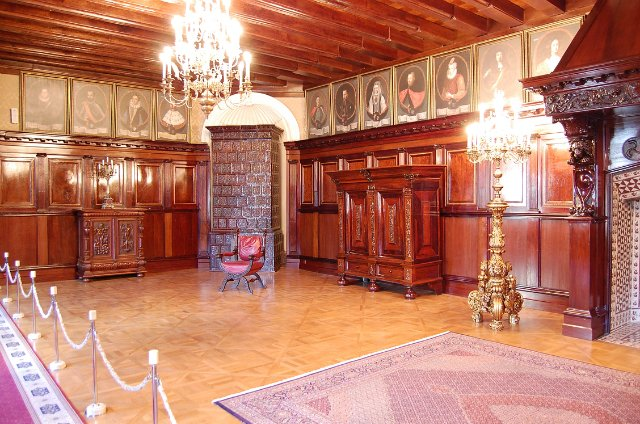
The Radziwiłł portrait gallery

The estate was owned by the Radziwiłł magnate family from 1533, when it was awarded to Mikołaj Radziwiłł and his brother Jan Radziwiłł after the extinction of the Kiszka family. Since the Radziwiłłs were one of the most important and wealthy clans of the Grand Duchy of Lithuania and the Crown of the Kingdom of Poland, it was there that the Lithuanian Metrica was moved in 1551. In 1586 the estate was turned into an ordynacja.

After the Union of Lublin the castle became one of the most important residences in the central part of the Polish–Lithuanian Commonwealth.

In 1582, Mikołaj Krzysztof "Sierotka" Radziwiłł, the Marshal of Lithuania, Voivode of Trakai–Vilnius and castellan of Šiauliai, started the construction of an imposing square three-storey "château". Although the works were based on a pre-existing structure of a medieval castle, the former fortifications were entirely turned into a renaissance-baroque house. Construction was completed by 1604, and they added several galleries half a century later. The château's corners were fortified with four octagonal towers.

In 1706, during the Great Northern War, Charles XII's army sacked the castle and destroyed its fortifications. Several decades later, the Radziwiłłs invited some German and Italian architects to substantially renovate and enlarge the castle. Antoni Zaleski decorated its yellow facades with baroque stucco work. The 16th-century castle gates were also reconstructed, and the two-storey gatehouse tower was crowned with a helm. It was at this time that the three separate buildings surrounding the central courtyard were joined into a single structure.

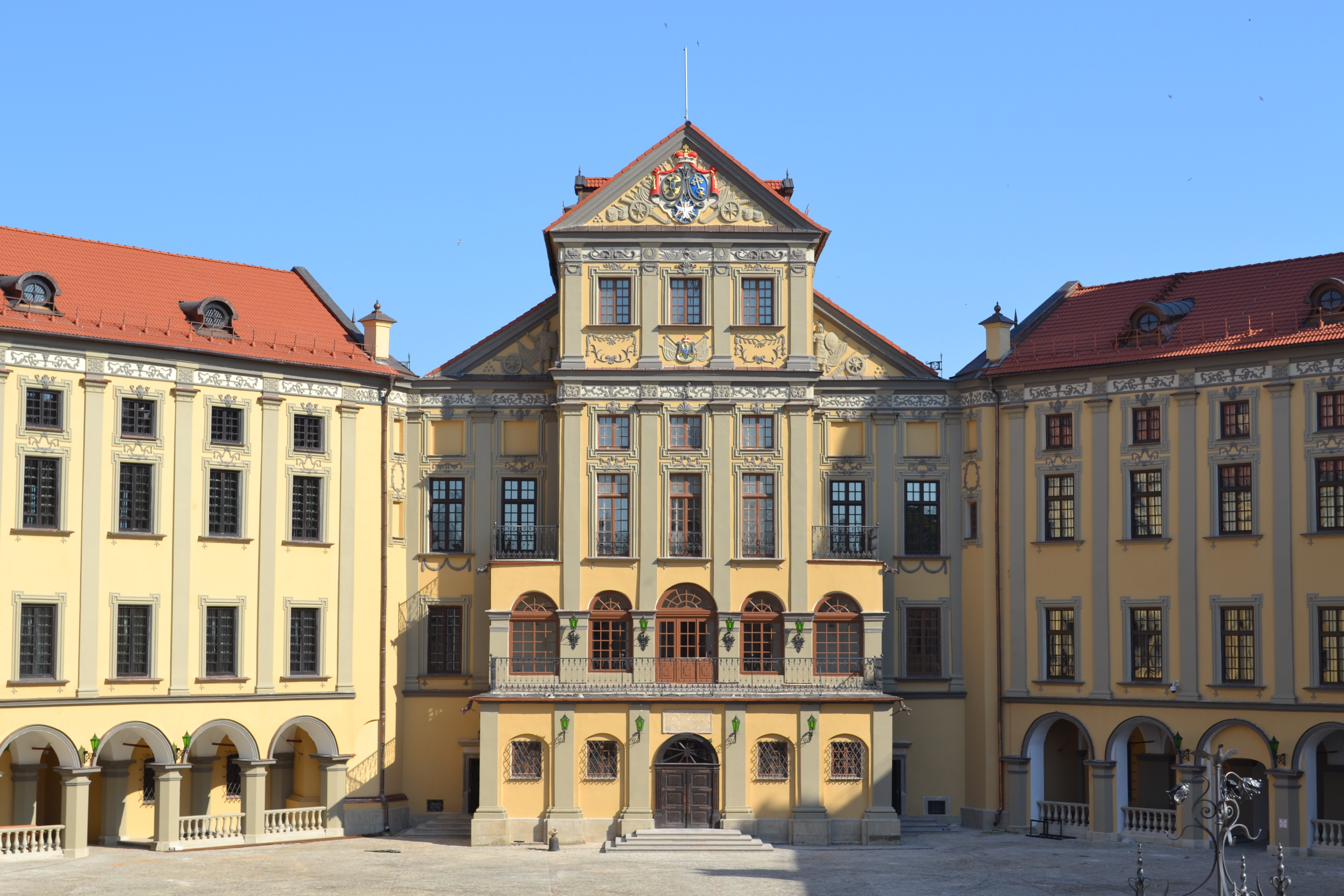
The main entrance to the residence

During the Polish–Russian War of 1792, the castle was seized by Russian forces and the Radziwiłł family was expelled. Soon afterwards the Lithuanian Metrica was transferred to Saint Petersburg (where it still remains today), while the majority of works of art gathered in the palace were distributed among various Russian and Polish nobles in support of Catherine the Great. Due to the Second Partition of Poland in 1793, the castle became part of Russia.

Abandoned both by the original owners and by the Russian army, the palace gradually fell into disrepair. However, it was restored by the Radziwiłłs and between 1881 and 1886 the castle's interiors were renovated by Prince Antoni Wilhelm Radziwiłł and his French wife, Marie de Castellane. They also designed a landscape park in English style. With an area of more than one square kilometre, the park is one of the biggest such facilities in Europe.

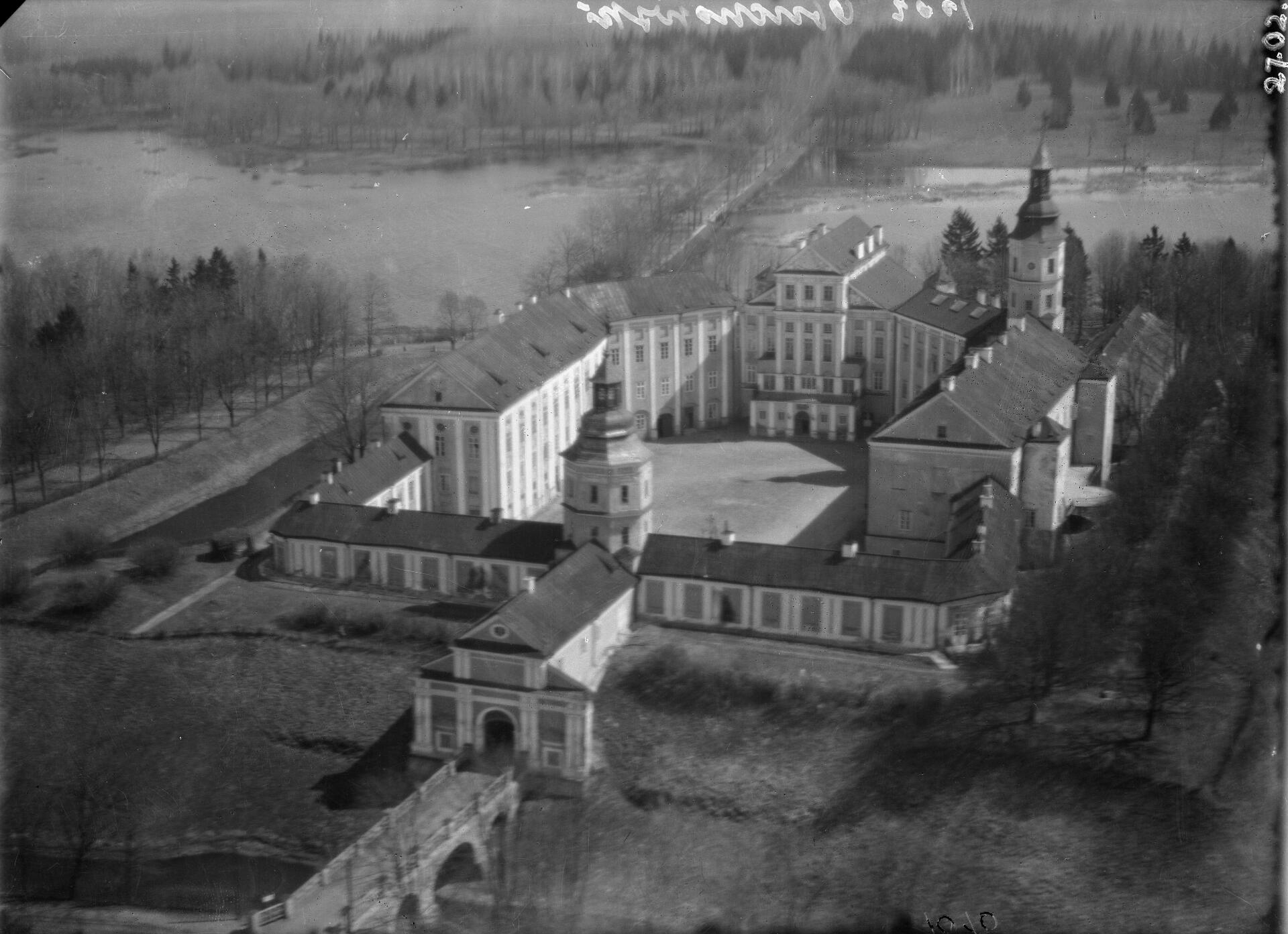
A bird's eye view (1927)

After the Polish–Soviet War the castle complex and the surrounding area became part of the newly established Second Polish Republic in 1920. During that time, the castle was considered one of the most beautiful in the Kresy region. During the invasion of Poland in 1939, the Radziwiłł family was expelled from the castle by the Red Army. In Soviet times, the castle was used as a sanatorium, while the park gradually fell into neglect.

The castle complex is considered to be the most beautiful in Belarus. In 2005 it was listed by UNESCO as a World Heritage Site.

The castle complex was extensively restored from 2004–2012.

== Other Radziwiłł castles ==
- Olyka Castle
- Lubcha Castle
- Mir Castle
- Biržai Castle
- Dubingiai Castle

== See also ==
- List of Baroque residences
