= Lyubcha, Belarus =

Urban-type settlement in Grodno Region, Belarus

Lyubcha Любча
- Urban-type settlement
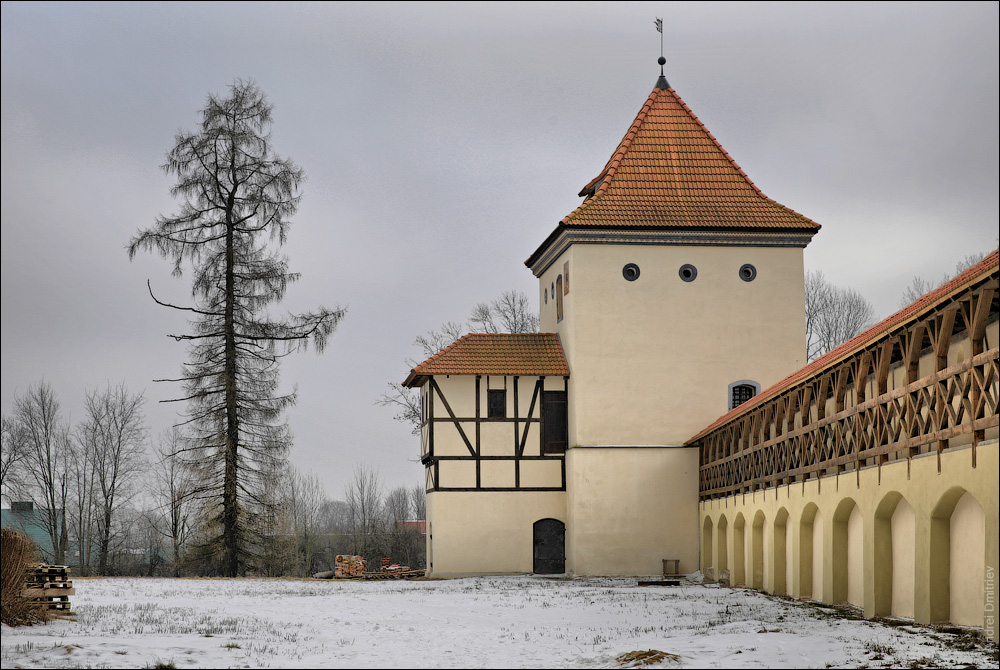
- Lyubcha castle

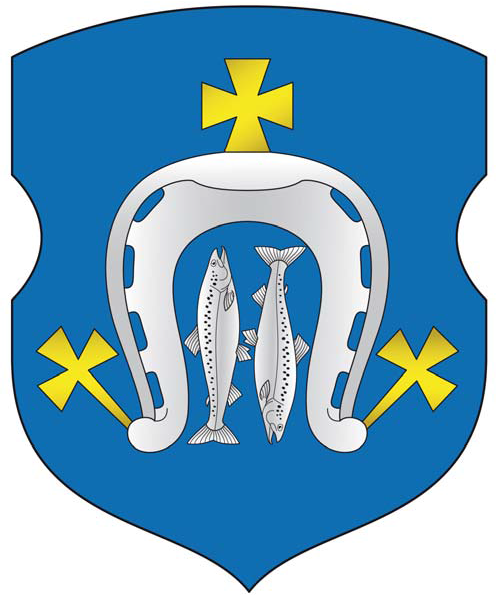
- Coat of arms

- Location within Belarus
- Coordinates: 53°45′N 26°03′E
- Country: Belarus
- Region: Grodno Region
- District: Novogrudok District

Population (2025)
  - Total: 962
- Time zone: UTC+3 (MSK)
- Postal code: 231425
- Area code: +375-1597
- License plate: 4

Lyubcha (Note: Belarusian: Любча, romanized: Liubča; Russian: Любча; Polish: Lubcz; Yiddish: לובטש, romanized: Lubtsh.) is an urban-type settlement in Novogrudok District, Grodno Region, Belarus. It is located near the Neman River about 23 kilometres (14 mi) from Novogrudok. As of 2025, it has a population of 962.

== History ==
Within the Grand Duchy of Lithuania, Lyubcha was part of Nowogródek Voivodeship.

In 1795, the town was acquired by the Russian Empire as a result of the Third Partition of Poland. From 1921 until 1939, Lyubcha (Lubcz) was part of the Second Polish Republic. Before World War II, approximately 1500 Jews lived in Lubcha. There were 2 synagogues and a Jewish cemetery.

In September 1939, Lyubcha was occupied by the Red Army and, on 14 November 1939, incorporated into the Byelorussian SSR. From 26 June 1941 until 8 July 1944, Lyubcha was occupied by Nazi Germany and administered as a part of the Generalbezirk Weißruthenien of Reichskommissariat Ostland.

A short time after their arrival, the Germans selected 50 Jewish men and brought them to Novogrudok, where they were shot. In March 1942, a ghetto was fenced in and Jews from surroundings villages, like Delatyche, were brought into the ghetto. Later, three members of the Judenrat and Jewish police were shot by the Germans under the pretext of bad hygienic conditions inside the ghetto. Although the fate of the remaining Jews is not completely clear, it seems that a group was sent to the Novogrudok ghetto, where they were later shot in August 1942. Another group was sent to complete road construction near the village of Vorobyeviche, where they were also shot in August 1942. It appears that several hundred Jews were shot and buried in the cemetery during spring 1942.

== Sights ==
- Lubcz Castle of the Radziwill family
- Orthodox church of Saint Elijah (1910–14)
- Catholic church, 1930
- Old Jewish cemetery
Views of Lubcha Castle

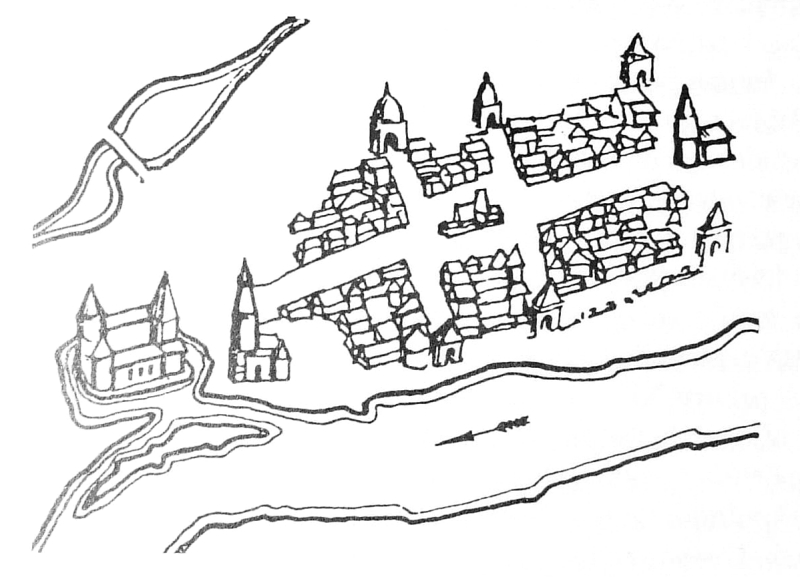
17th century

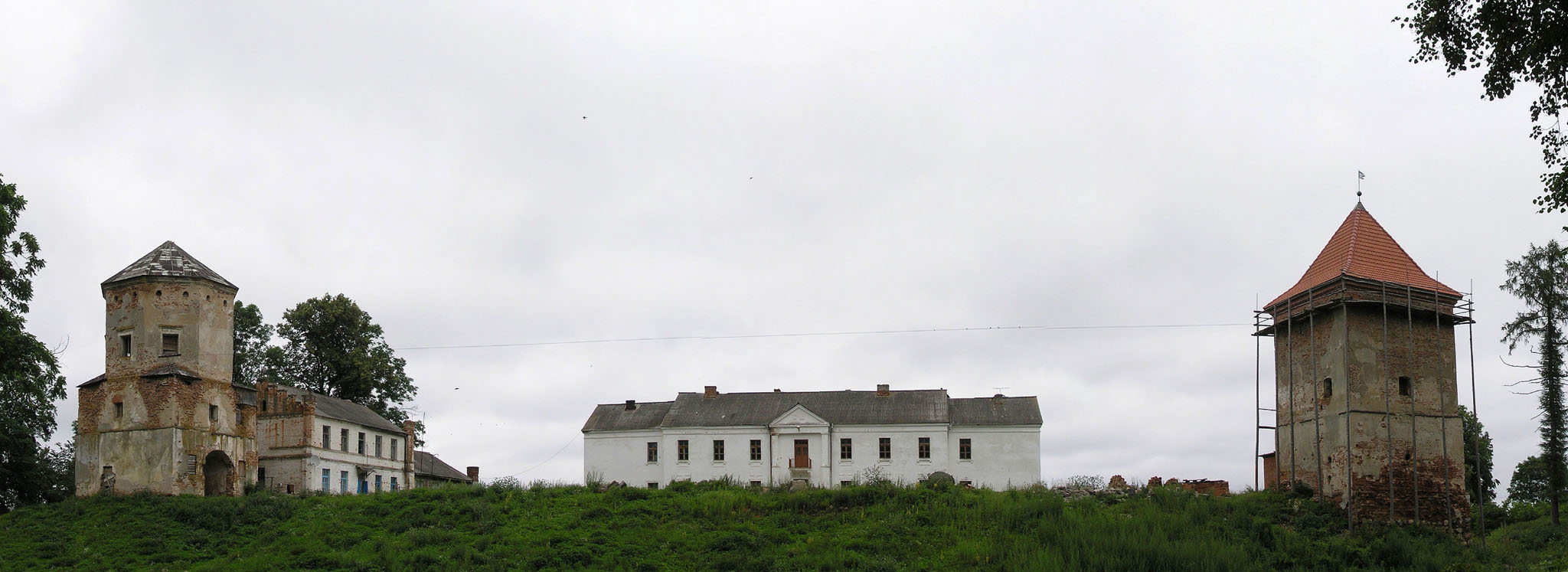
Modern view

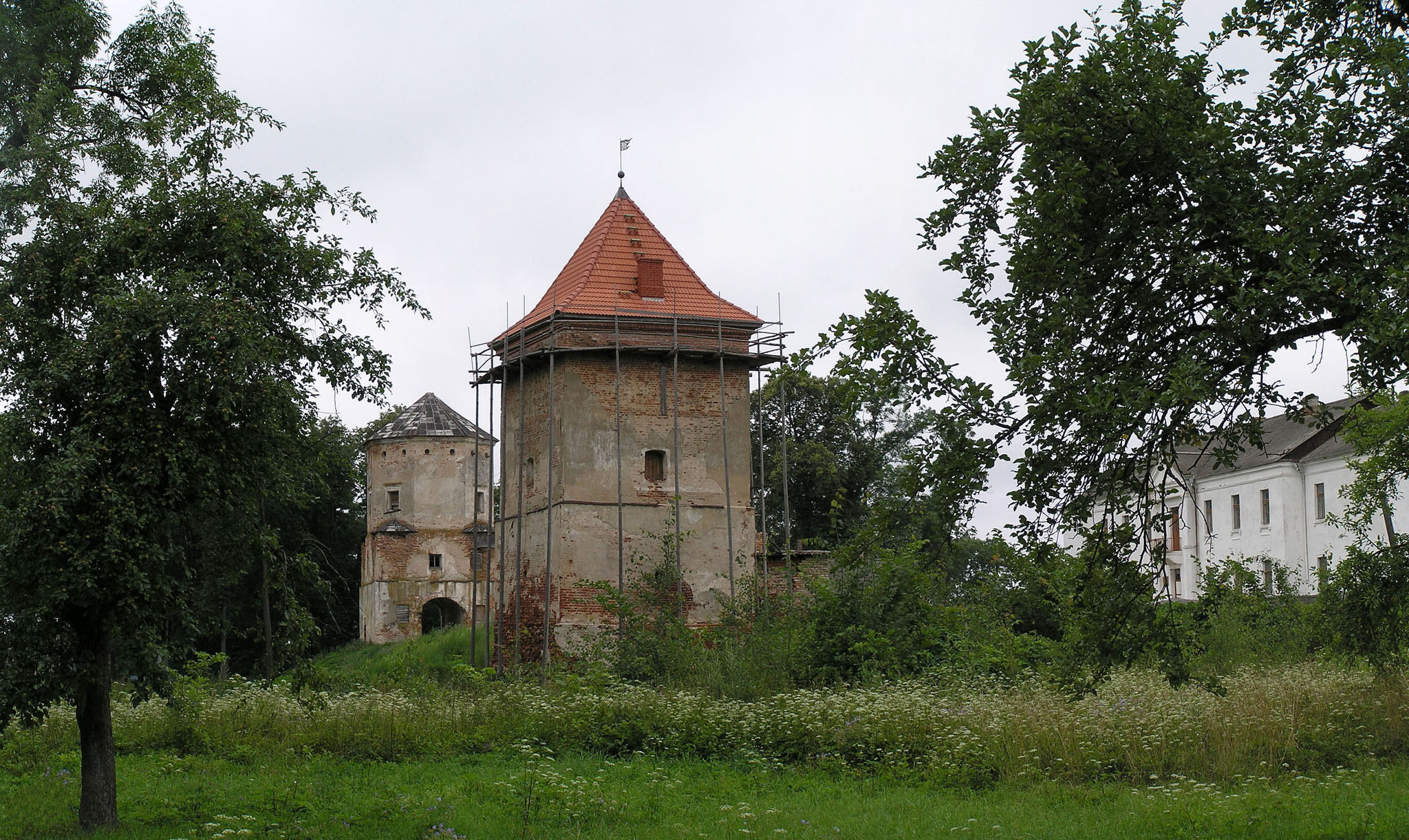
The two remaining towers

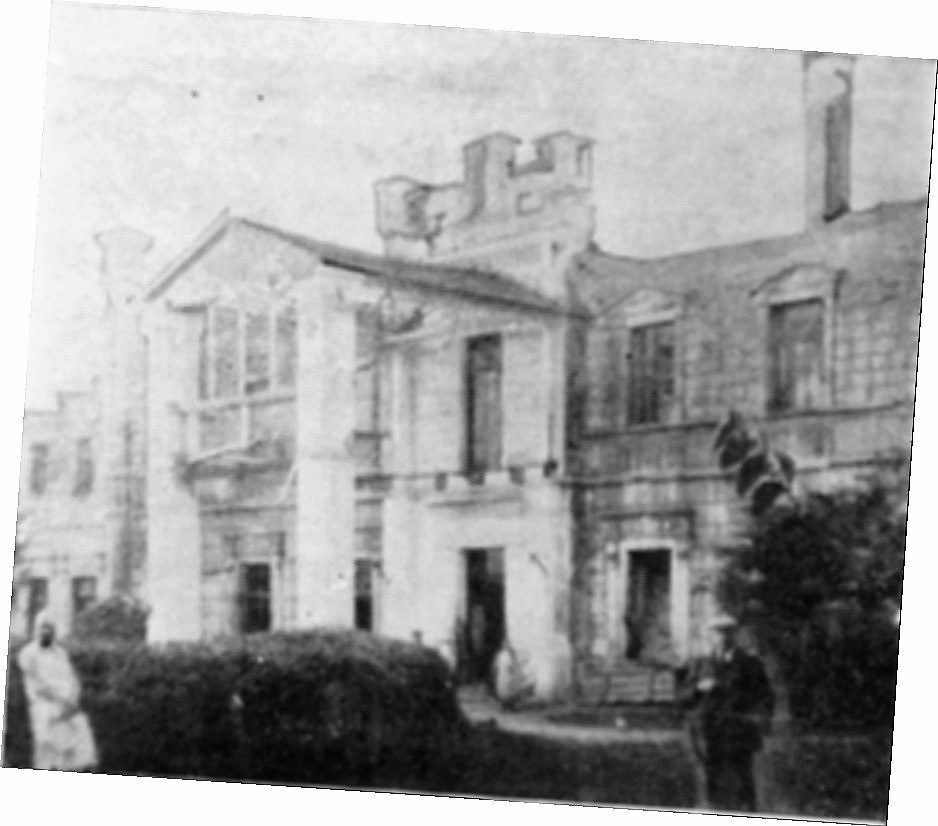
In 1920
