= Albrycht Stanisław Radziwiłł =

Polish–Lithuanian nobleman (1593–1656)

- Grand Chancellor of Lithuania
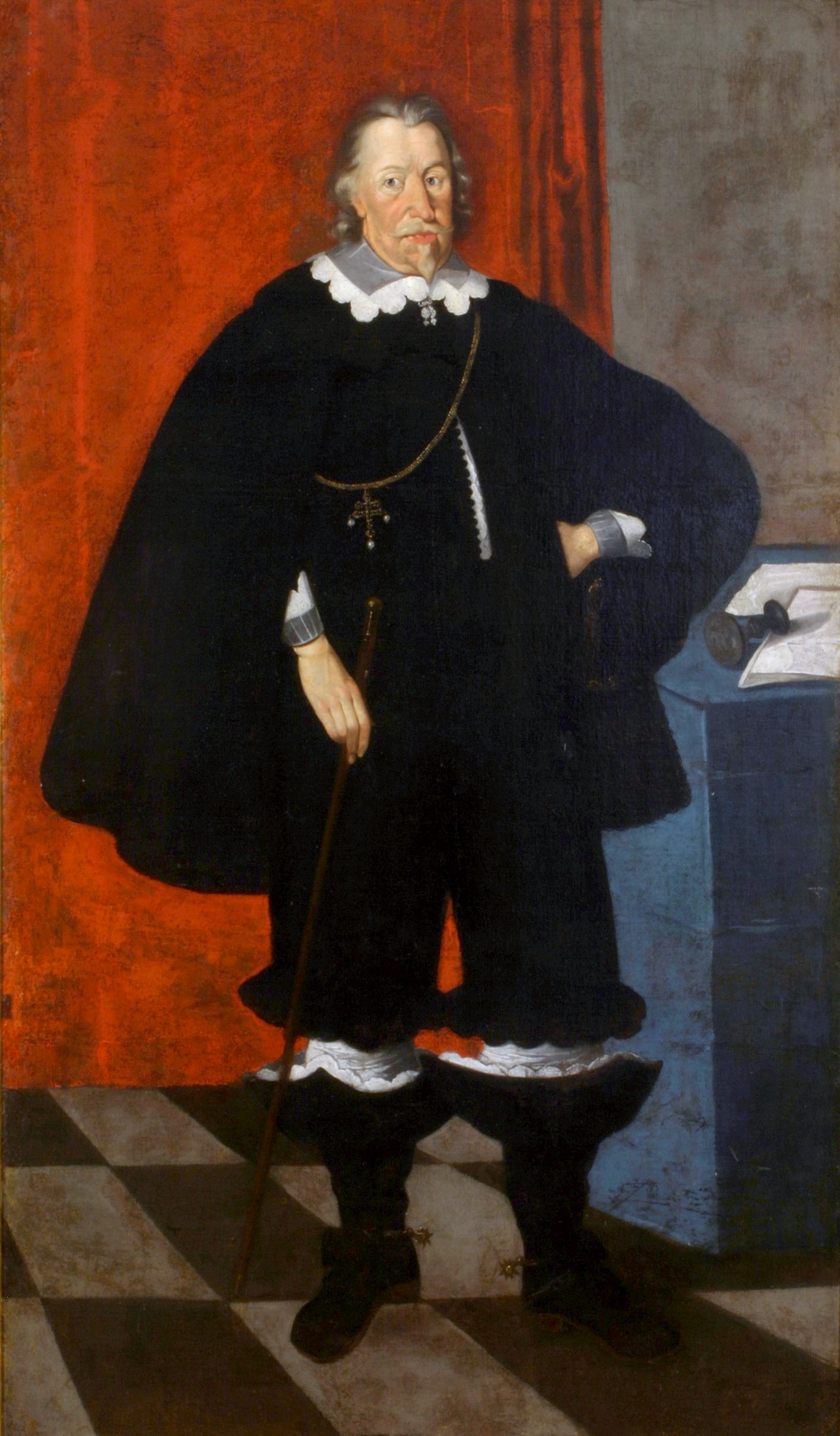
- Portrait by Peter Danckerts de Rij, 1640s
- Coat of arms: Trąby
- Born: 1 July 1593; Ołyka, Poland
- Died: 12 November 1656 (aged 63); Gdańsk, Poland
- Noble family: Radziwiłł
- Spouses: Regina von Eisenreich; Anna Krystyna Lubomirska
- Issue: none
- Father: Stanisław Pius Radziwiłł
- Mother: Marianna Myszka

Albrycht Stanisław Radziwiłł (1 July 1593 – 12 November 1656) was a Polish nobleman, a Reichfürst and a politician from the Polish–Lithuanian Commonwealth, who served as the Lithuanian Vice-chancellor from 1619, the Lithuanian Grand Chancellor and starosta of Vilnius from 1623. He was a member of the powerful Radziwiłł family, last of the Ołyka line, fourth to bear the name of Albrycht. During his life he was an influential magnate and diplomat in the country. Radziwiłł was a vigorous Roman Catholic and staunch supporter of Counter-Reformation, but also the arch enemy of the Protestant community.

== Biography ==
He was born on 1 July 1593 in his family manor in Ołyka to Stanisław Pius Radziwiłł and Marianna née Myszka. During his life Albrycht held several important posts in the Polish–Lithuanian Commonwealth, some of them hereditary. Apart from directing his family estate in Ołyka at Volhynia (ordynacja ołycka), he was in charge of foreign policies and internal affairs of the Grand Duchy of Lithuania, as he held the posts Lithuanian Vice-chancellor (since 1619), Grand Chancellor of Lithuania and starosta of Vilnius (since 1623), as well as governor of Kowel, Tuchola, Gniew, Pinsk, Wieluń, Daugpilis, Kobryn and Šiauliai.

Trąby coat of arms

Supporter of King of Poland and Grand Duke of Lithuania Sigismund III Vasa, he often stood in opposition to his son and successor, Władysław IV Vasa on the matters of religion. Władysław was lenient towards Protestants and encouraged religious tolerance, while Albrycht was an outspoken opponent of all non-Catholics, sometimes even refusing to stamp documents with his Chancellor's seal granting them rights and privileges. He was also a patriot of Grand Duchy: he always strived to ensure that there is no discrimination towards his compatriots and they have equal representation in the Commonwealth federal political structure, just as he tried to ensure that non-Catholics had as little of it as possible. In his opposition to heretics he was supported by Chancellor Jerzy Ossoliński. He sympathized with the Habsburg faction and supported Queen Cecilia Renata of Austria, the Habsburg wife of King Władysław IV.

Just like the other Radziwiłł family members, he was famous for the support given to his relatives: he did not fail to watch over the interests of his Calvinist cousins, despite being renowned for his opposition to the heretics.

Despite being one of the most powerful magnates in the Polish–Lithuanian Commonwealth, both of his marriages (with Regina von Eisenreich in 1619, court lady of Queen Constance and after her death in 1637 with Anna Krystyna Działyńska-Lubomirska in 1638) were childless.

During later stages of his life, Radziwiłł wrote a diary Memoriale rerum gestarum in Polonia (Memoir or Diary of the history of Poland) covering the 1632–1656 period. This book is perhaps his most famous legacy.

He died childless on 12 November 1656. His estates were inherited by Ordynat of Nesvyžius line of Radziwiłł family.
