= Lyubcha Castle =

Castle in Liubča, Belarus

Coordinates: 53°45′7.31″N 26°04′7.74″E

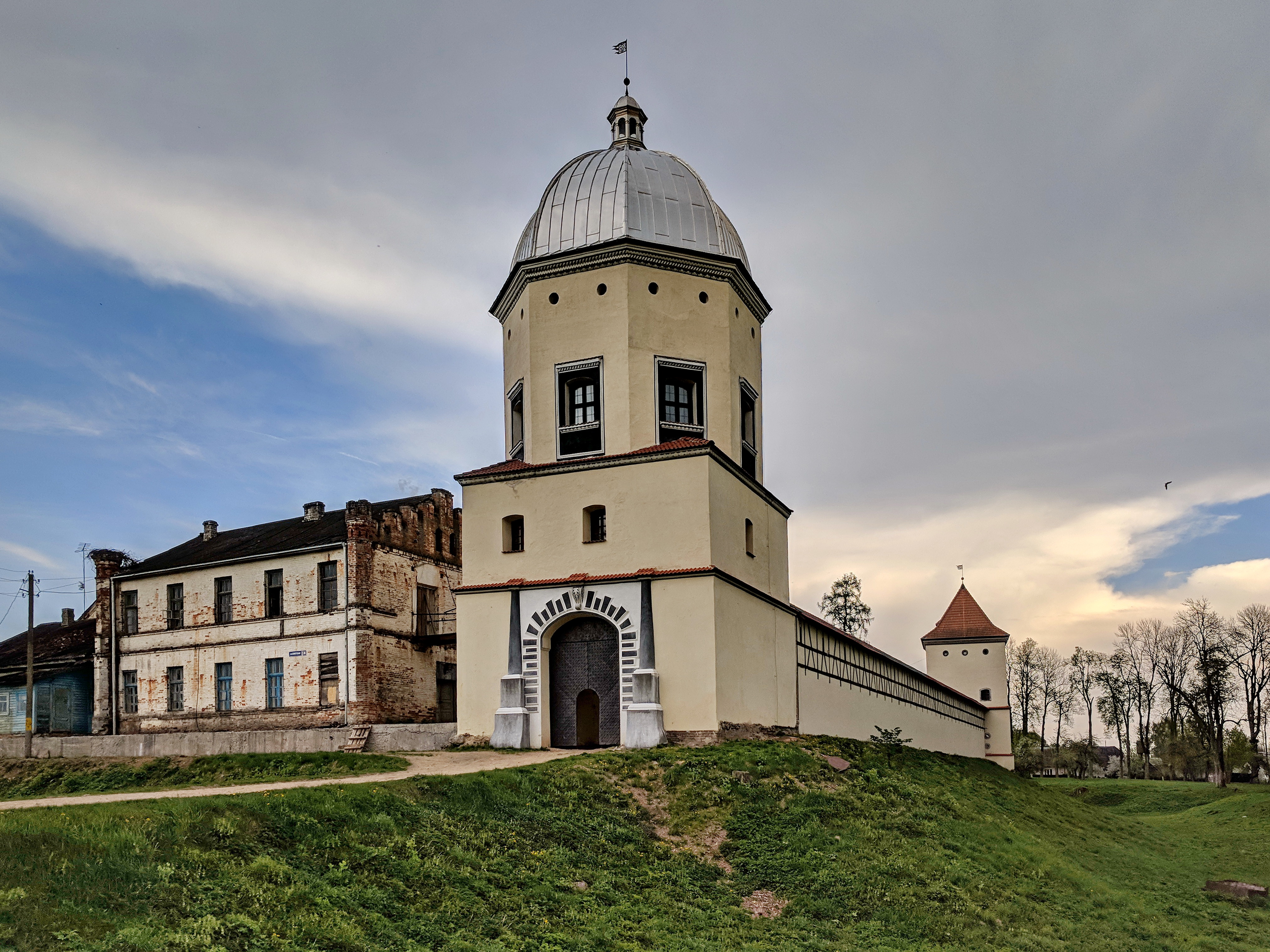
The castle after the recentmost reconstruction campaign

Lyubcha Castle or Lubcz Castle (Belarusian: Любчанскі замак) was a residential castle of the Radziwill family on the left bank of the Neman River at Lyubcha near Novogrudok, Belarus.

The castle began its life in 1581 as a fortified residence of Jan Kiszka, a powerful Calvinist magnate. It had timber walls and a single stone tower, and was surrounded by moats on three sides, the fourth side protected by the river.

Lyubcha later passed to Janusz Radziwiłł, Great Hetman of Lithuania, who rebuilt the castle in stone. In 1655, it was taken and devastated by the rebellious Cossacks under Ivan Zolotarenko. Only the barbican and one other tower stood after the Cossack incursion.

The deserted estate changed owners several times, remaining untenanted until the mid-19th century, when a Gothic Revival palace was built on the grounds.

The Lyubcha estate suffered much damage during both world wars. The palace was reduced to a shell in 1914 and was remodeled into a school building by the Soviets in 1947. In the early 21st century, some of the castle walls were rebuilt by a team of volunteers.
