= Sprowa =

- Village
- Location within Poland
- Coordinates: 50°35′55″N 19°53′29″E
- Country: Poland
- Voivodeship: Świętokrzyskie
- County: Jędrzejów
- Gmina: Słupia
- Population: 370
- Time zone: UTC+1 (CET)
  - Summer (DST): UTC+2 (CEST)
- Vehicle registration: TJE

Sprowa [ˈsprɔva] is a village in the administrative district of Gmina Słupia, within Jędrzejów County, Świętokrzyskie Voivodeship, in south-central Poland. It lies approximately 6 km (4 mi) west of Słupia, 30 km (19 mi) west of Jędrzejów, and 61 km (38 mi) south-west of the regional capital Kielce.

== History ==
Within the Kingdom of Poland, Sprowa was a private village of Polish nobility, including the Odrowąż and Szczepanowski families. After the Partitions of Poland, Sprowa fell to the Russian Partition of Poland in 1815. During the January Uprising, on December 4, 1863, a battle was fought at Sprowa between Polish insurgents and Russian troops. In 1918, Poland regained independence and control of the village.

During the German occupation (World War II), a local Polish farmer, Jan Molenda, hid 23 Jews from Szczekociny, Raszków, Łódź, Dąbrowica and Słupia on his farm in 1942–1943, including three families with children (see Rescue of Jews by Poles during the Holocaust). The Germans discovered the hideout, murdered 18 captured Jews on the spot, and arrested Molenda, who then escaped from prison in Jędrzejów, and hid from the Germans until the end of the occupation.

== Notable people ==
- Jan Sprowski (died 1464), Roman Catholic Archbishop of Gniezno, Primate of Poland
