= Węgrzynów =

Węgrzynów may refer to the following places in Poland:

- Węgrzynów, Milicz County in Lower Silesian Voivodeship (south-west Poland)
- Węgrzynów, Trzebnica County in Lower Silesian Voivodeship (south-west Poland)
- Węgrzynów, Łódź Voivodeship (central Poland)
- Węgrzynów, Świętokrzyskie Voivodeship (south-central Poland)
- Nowy Węgrzynów in Jędrzejów County, Świętokrzyskie Voivodeship
- Stary Węgrzynów in Jędrzejów County, Świętokrzyskie Voivodeship
