= Kamień Śląski Palace =

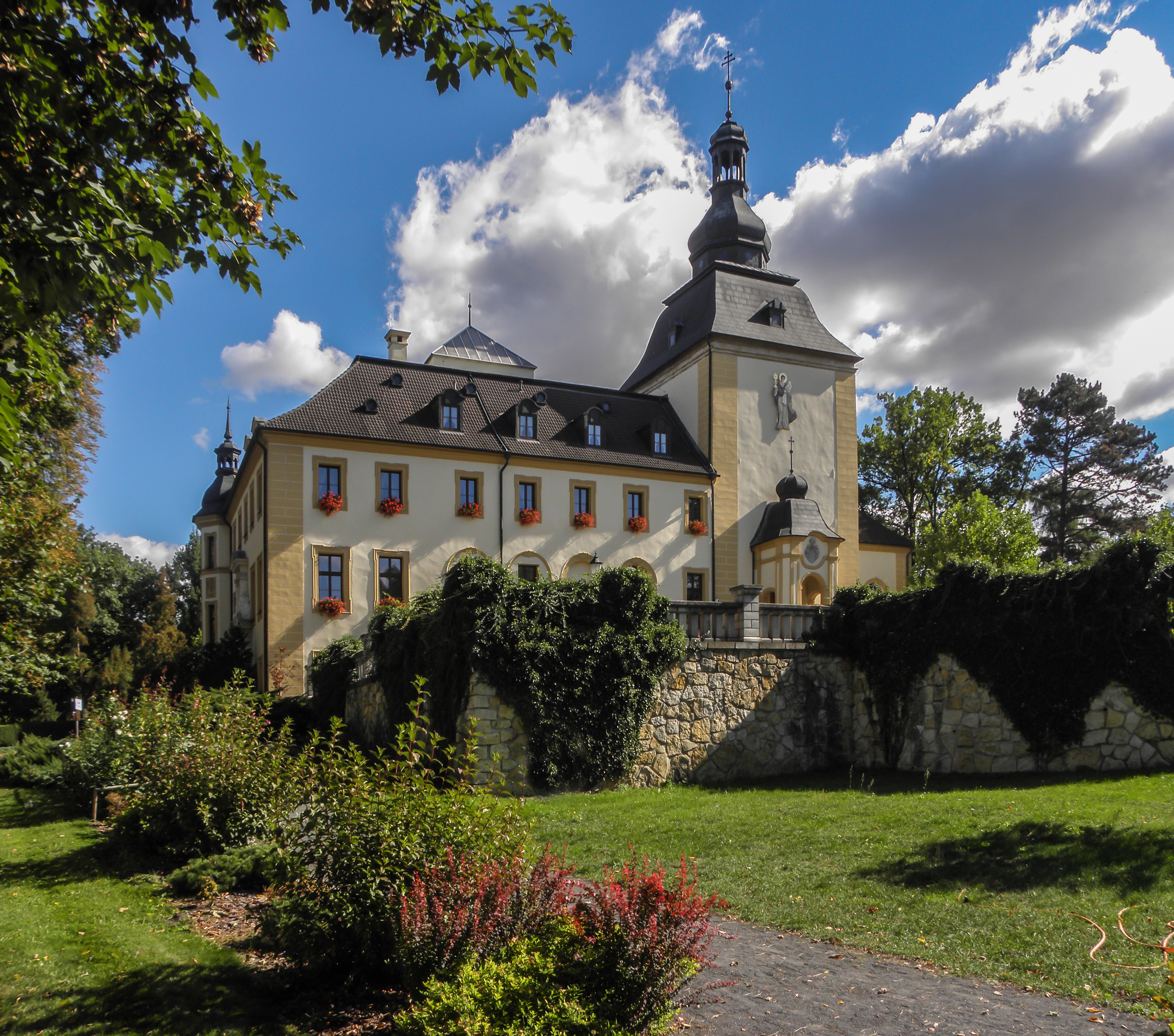
- Kamień Śląski Palace

- Location of the Kamień Śląski Palace in Poland
- 50°32′10″N 18°04′31″E
- Location: Kamień Śląski, Opole Voivodeship; in Poland

Site notes
- Architectural style: Baroque

Kamień Śląski Palace (Polish: Pałac w Kamieniu Śląskim) - a historical building, located by ul. Parkowa 1 (1 Parkowa Street) in Kamień Śląski, Poland. Presently, the palace houses the Sanctuary of St. Hyacinth, a popular regional pilgrimage and tourist site.

The patron of the palace is St. Hyacinth, who was born in the palace in 1183. Five centuries later, the von Larischów family rebuilt the palace in the Baroque architectural style, while the chamber, where the most famous member (Hyacinth) of the Odrowąż family was born, was made into a chapel. Since the eighteenth-century, the site has been popular among pilgrims.
