= Odrowąż family =

Polish noble family

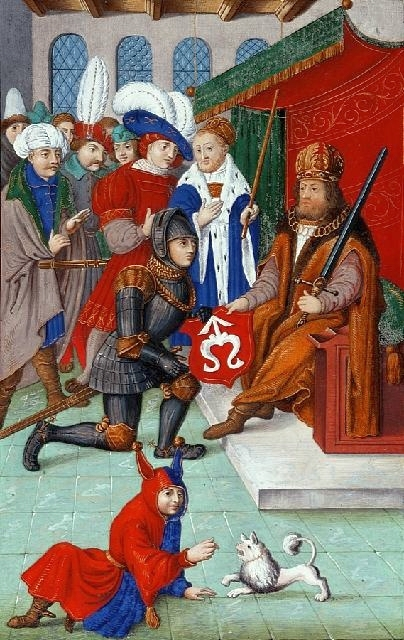
Ennoblement of the Odrowąż family from Liber Genesos illustris Familiae Shidlovicae

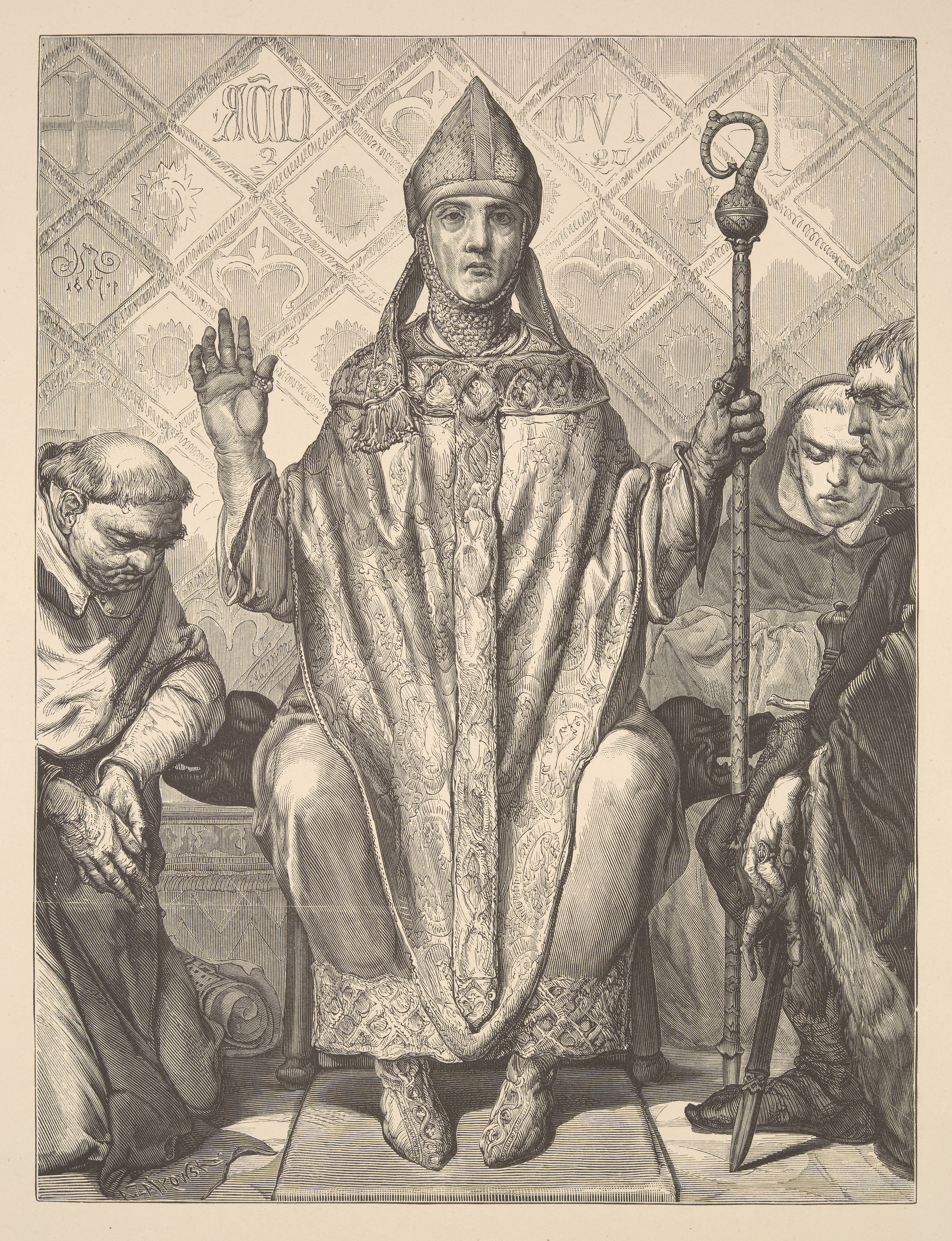
Iwo Odrowąż, Bishop of Kraków

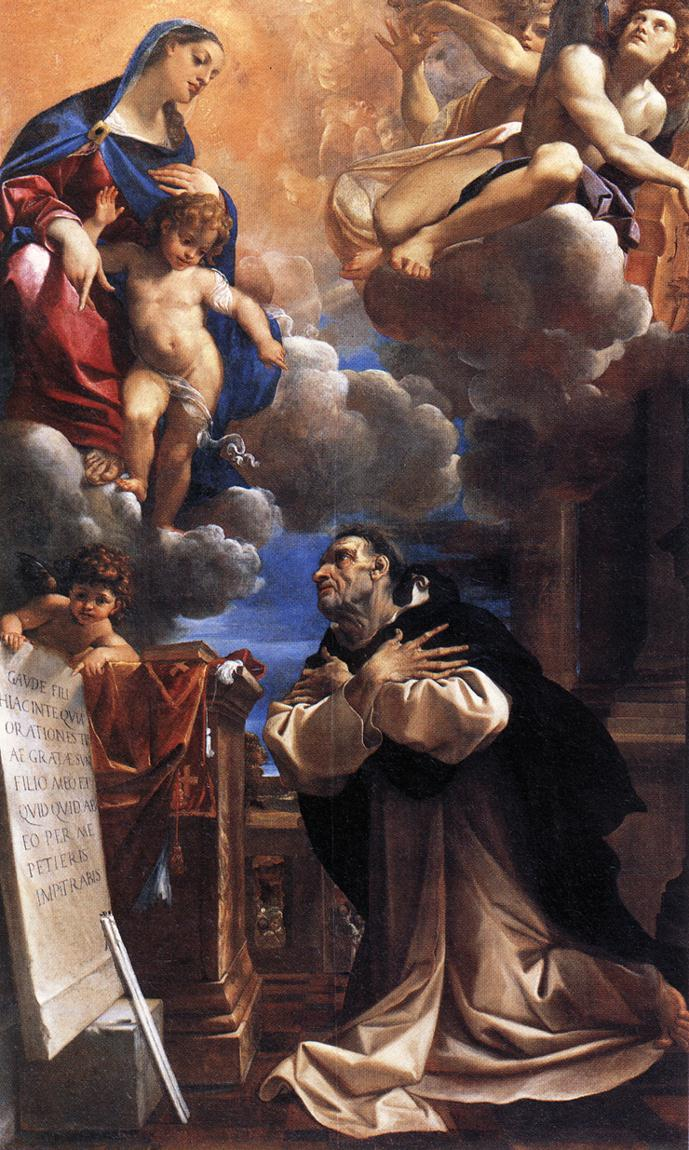
Saint Hyacinth

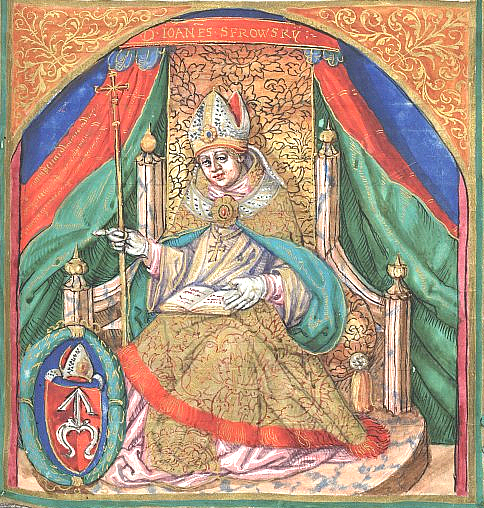
Jan Odrowąż from Sprowa, Archbishop of Poland and Lithuania.

The Odrowąż family (plural: Odrowążowie or Odrowąże) was an important family of knights in the medieval Kingdom of Poland, strongly allied with the Catholic church in the 12th century.

== History ==
Their family seats were in Upper Silesia and in Lesser Poland, and after the 13th-century invasion by the Teutonic Order, they moved to Silesia just within Lesser Poland. The progenitor of the family was Prandota Stary, who came to Poland in the 12th century from Moravia (or possibly Bohemia).

== Notable members ==
- Iwo Odrowąż, Archbishop of Gniezno, Archbishop of Kraków
- Czesław Odrowąż vel Blessed Ceslaus
- Jacek Odrowąż vel saint Hyacinth of Poland
- Bronisława Odrowąż vel Blessed Bronisława
- Jan Prandota, Archbishop of Kraków
- Jan Odrowąż, Archbishop of Lwów
- Jan II Odrowąż of Sprowa, Archbishop of Gniezno
- Andrzej Odrowąż, Voivode of Podole, founder of the Bernardine Church in Lwów.
- Jan Odrowąż of Sprowa, starost of Lwów, Voivode of Ruthenia and Voivode of Podole
- Jan of Szczekociny, castellan of Lublin
- Piotr Odrowąż of Sprowa, starost of Lwów, Voivode of Ruthenia and Podole
- Zofia Odrowąż, married Hetman Jan Krzysztof Tarnowski h. Leliwa
- Stanisław Odrowąż, Voivode of Ruthenia and Podole, married to Anna of Masovia
- Jakub Dembiński, Great Chancellor of the Crown
- Strasz of Białaczów, knight, starost of Łęczyca

== Branches of the family ==
- Bębnowscy
- Białaczowscy
- Chlewiccy
- Dembińscy
- Kamieńscy
- Koneccy (vel Konieccy)
- Kryszkowski
- Krzyszkowski
- Maliccy (from Malice Kcyńskie)
- Modliszewscy
- Sprowscy
- Sypniewski
- Szydłowiecki
- Waligórscy
- Wądołowscy
- Potempski

== Coat of arms ==
The family used the Odrowąż coat of arms.

Odrowąż coat of arms

== Palaces ==
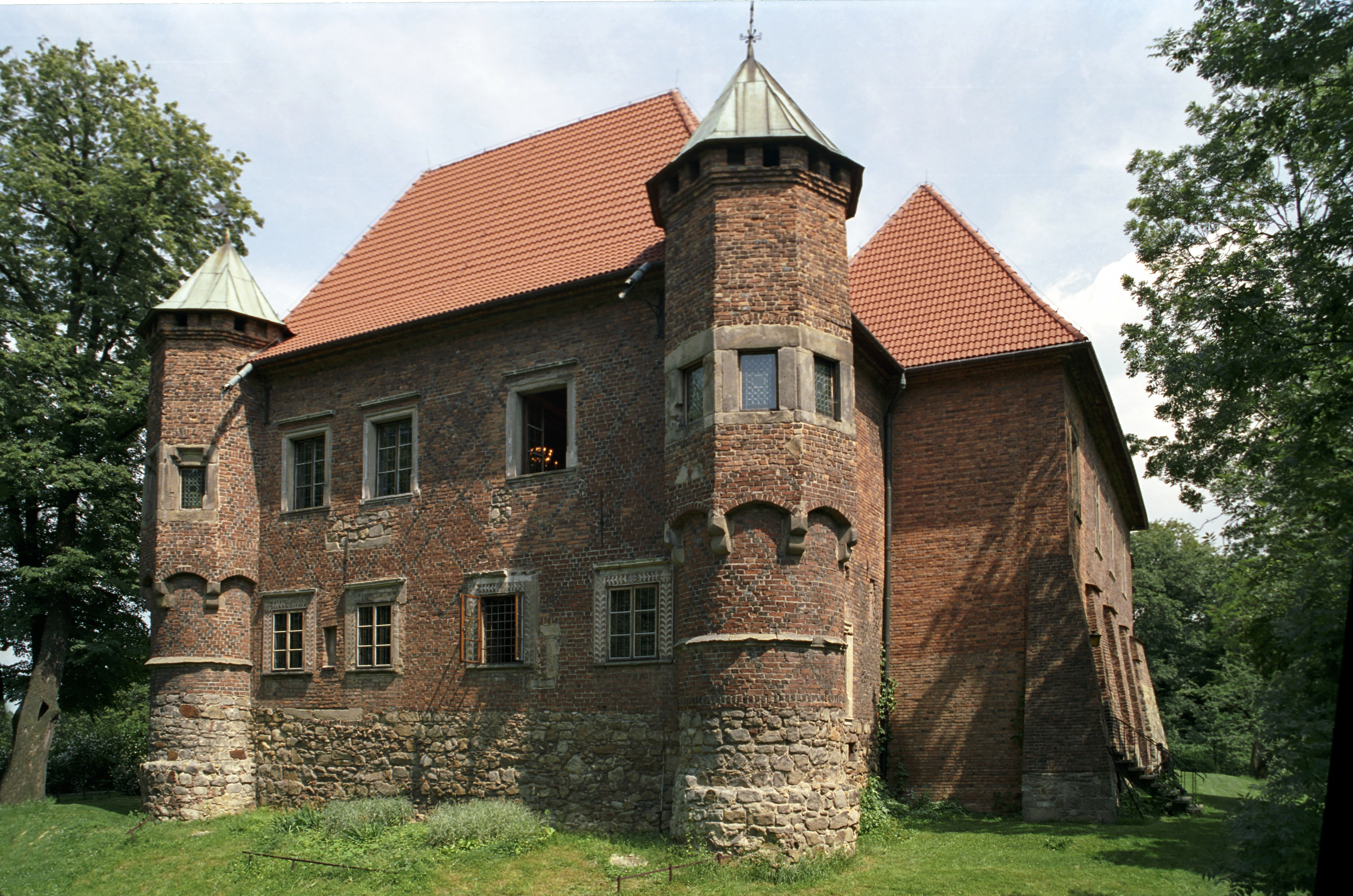
Castle in Dębno

== Related Houses ==
- clan Gryf
- Piast dynasty
- clan Łabędź
- Kołda of clan Oksza
- House of Spyra of clan Pernus

== See also ==
- Odrowąż, Świętokrzyskie Voivodeship
- Sypniewski
