= Andrzej Odrowąż =

Polish noble and statesman

Andrzej of Sprowa Odrowąż
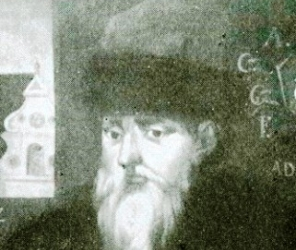
- Died: 1 May 1465
- Noble family: Odrowążowie
- Spouse: Anna Odrowąż
- Father: Piotr Odrowąż

Andrzej of Sprowa Odrowąż was a 15th-century Polish noble and statesman, starost of Ruthenia and Voivode of Podolia. He is best known as the founder of the Bernardine Church in Lwów.

== Biography ==
He belonged to the Odrowąż family. His father was the voivode of Podolsk and Russian Piotr Odrowąż, his mother was Katarzyna Odrowąż.

Andrew's father died in battle at Krasny, near Vaslui in Moldavia on September 6, 1450. In that year Andrew became the headman of Lviv and Podolia, and in 1452 he received the Russian voivodeship to govern.

In 1456 he briefly became a voivode in Podolia. In 1455 he became the owner of the town of Sędziszów of Małopolska. In 1458 he granted the town of Zenków Magdeburg law.

In 1460 he let in the city of Lviv Bernardine monks and allocated them a place for a monastery. This is how the Lviv Bernardine Monastery appeared.

In 1463 Odrowąż was sent by the king to Kamianets-Podolsky with an ambassadorial mission. Andrew Odrowąż died on May 1, 1465. He was buried under the altar of the church of St. Andrew in Lviv.
