= Rożnica =

- Village
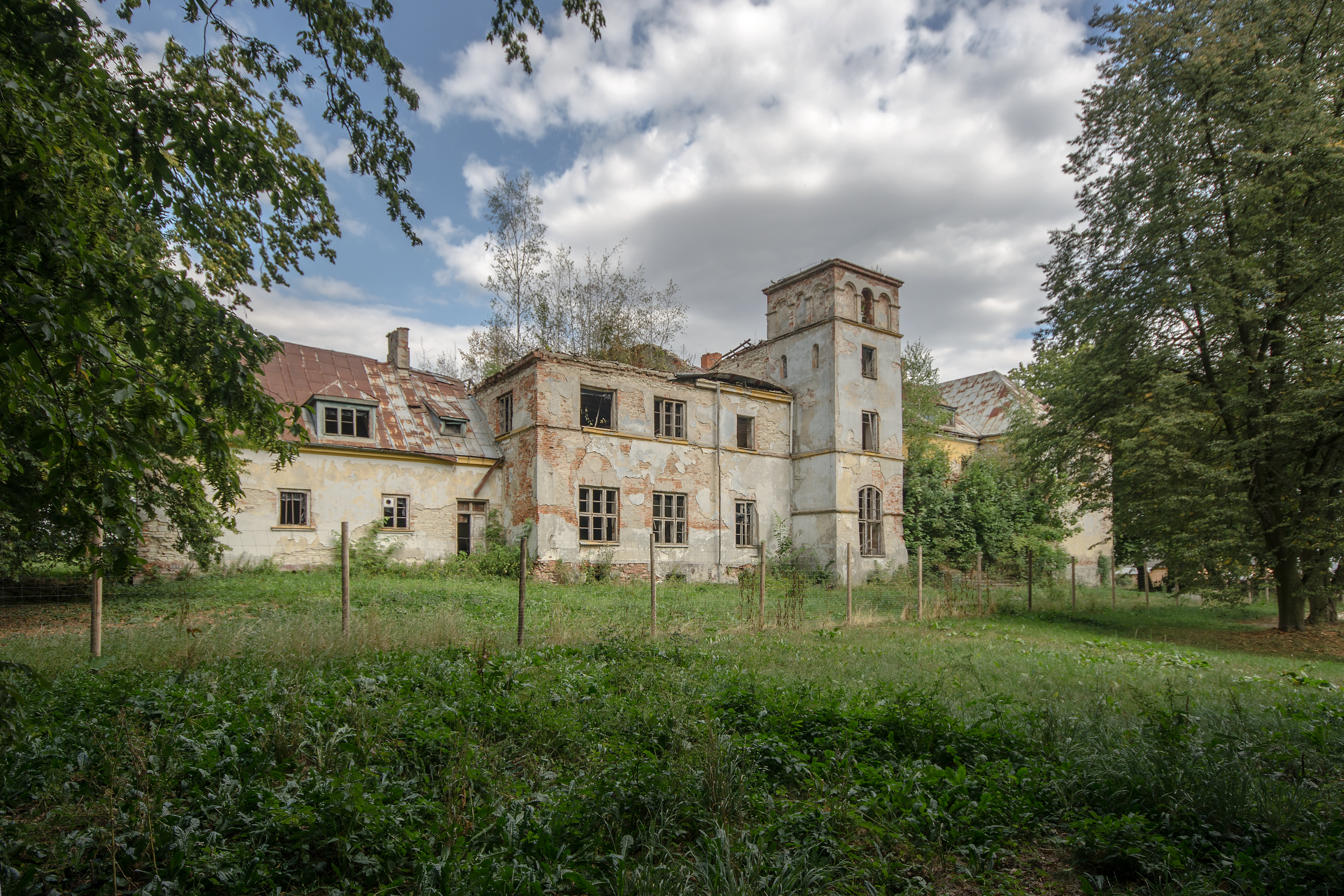
- Palace

- Location within Poland
- Coordinates: 50°36′28″N 20°1′20″E
- Country: Poland
- Voivodeship: Świętokrzyskie
- County: Jędrzejów
- Gmina: Słupia

Rożnica [rɔʐˈnit͡sa] is a village in the administrative district of Gmina Słupia, within Jędrzejów County, Świętokrzyskie Voivodeship, in south-central Poland. It lies approximately 4 km (2 mi) east of Słupia, 20 km (12 mi) west of Jędrzejów, and 52 km (32 mi) south-west of the regional capital Kielce.
