= Wywła =

- Village
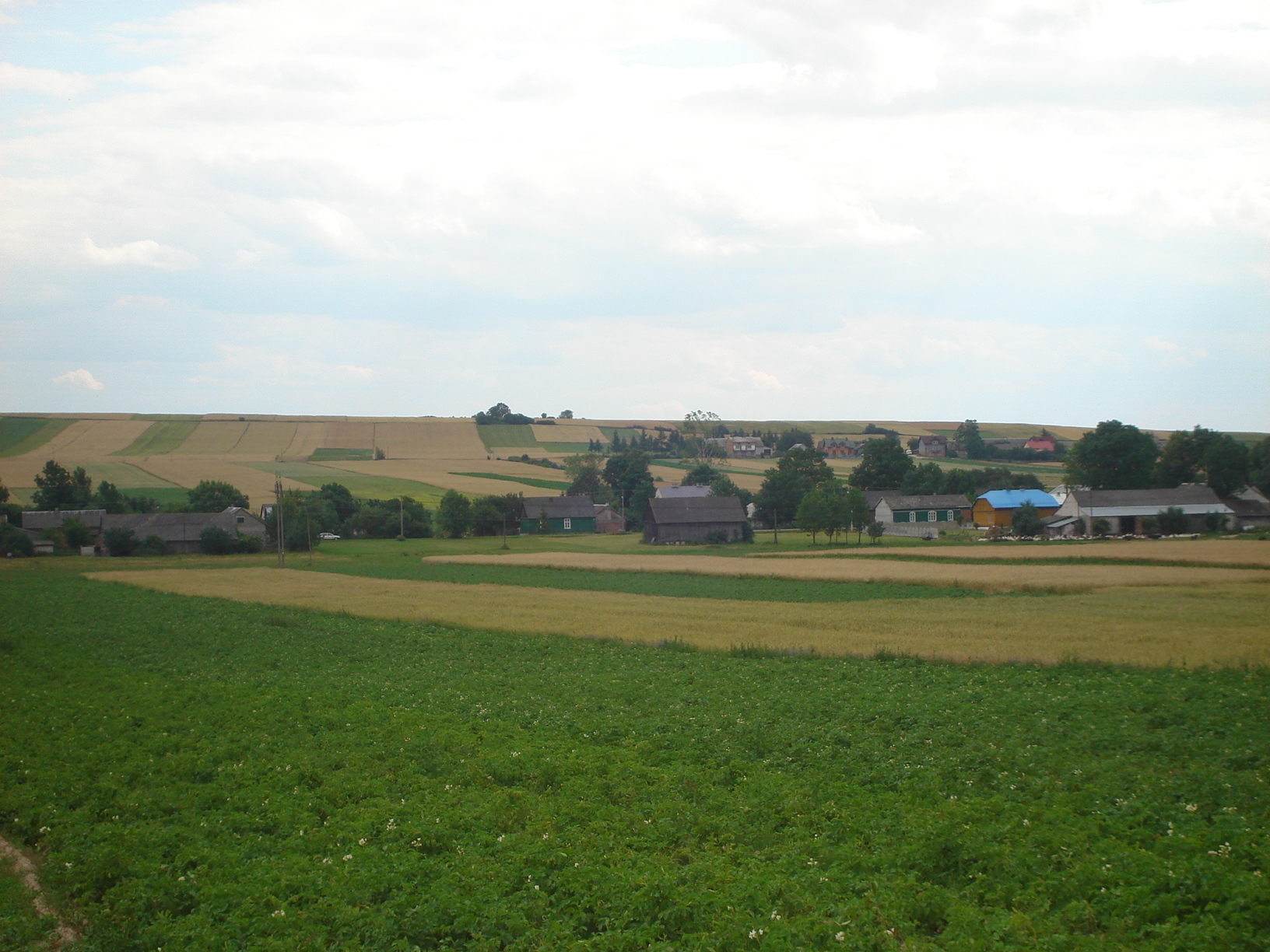

- Location within Poland
- Coordinates: 50°36′47″N 19°55′19″E
- Country: Poland
- Voivodeship: Świętokrzyskie
- County: Jędrzejów
- Gmina: Słupia
- Population: 750

Wywła [ˈvɨvwa] is a village in the administrative district of Gmina Słupia, within Jędrzejów County, Świętokrzyskie Voivodeship, in south-central Poland. It lies approximately 4 km (2 mi) west of Słupia, 27 km (17 mi) west of Jędrzejów, and 58 km (36 mi) south-west of the regional capital Kielce.
