= Sieńsko, Świętokrzyskie Voivodeship =

Sieńsko
- Village
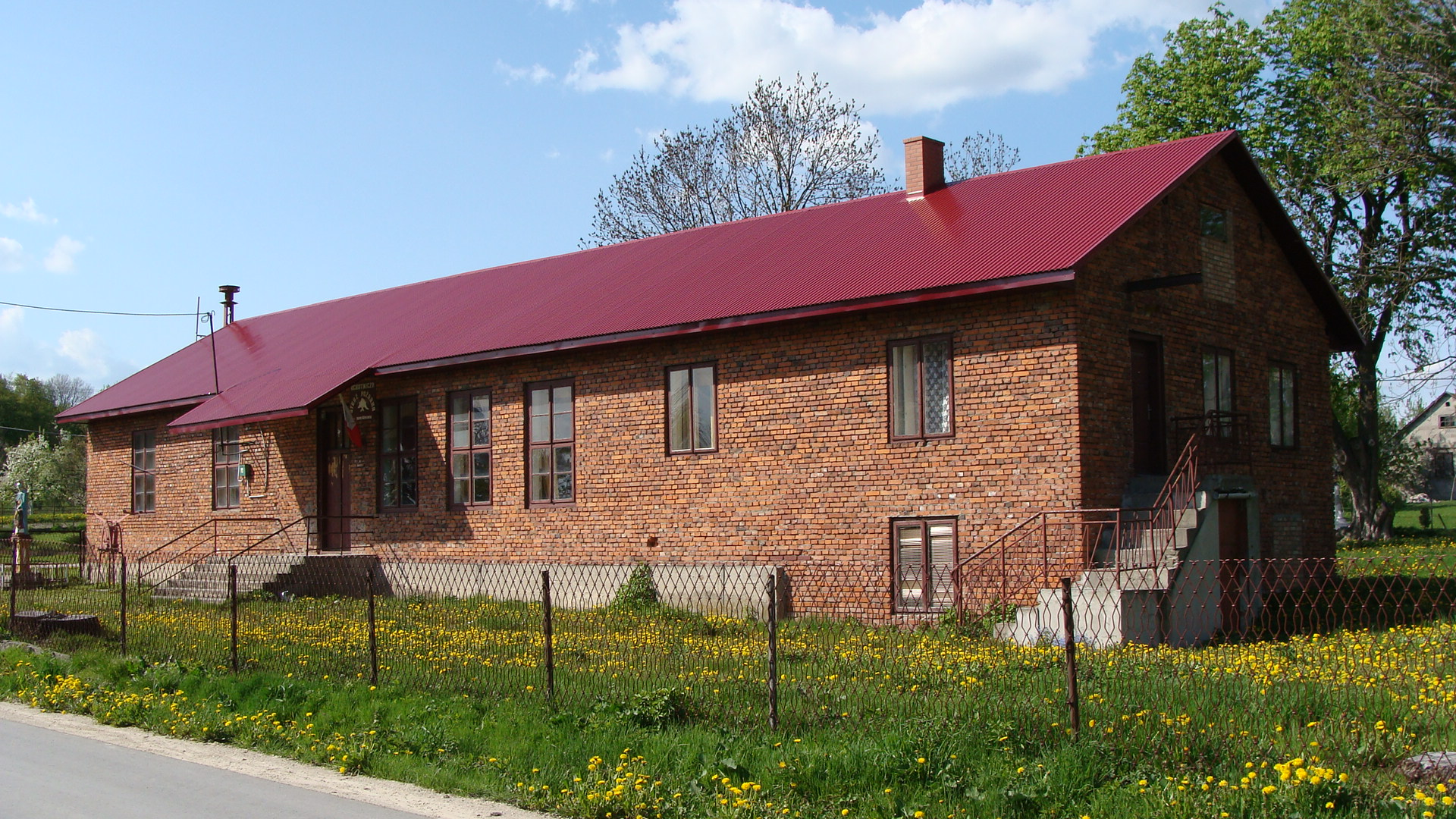
- Fire station

- Location within Poland
- Coordinates: 50°37′N 20°3′E
- Country: Poland
- Voivodeship: Świętokrzyskie
- County: Jędrzejów
- Gmina: Słupia

Sieńsko [ˈɕɛɲskɔ] is a village in the administrative district of Gmina Słupia, within Jędrzejów County, Świętokrzyskie Voivodeship, in south-central Poland. It lies approximately 6 km (4 mi) east of Słupia, 18 km (11 mi) west of Jędrzejów, and 50 km (31 mi) south-west of the regional capital Kielce.
