= Rawka, Świętokrzyskie Voivodeship =

Rawka
- Village
- Location within Poland
- Coordinates: 50°36′58″N 19°57′10″E
- Country: Poland
- Voivodeship: Świętokrzyskie
- County: Jędrzejów
- Gmina: Słupia
- Population: 180

Rawka [ˈrafka] is a village in the administrative district of Gmina Słupia, within Jędrzejów County, Świętokrzyskie Voivodeship, in south-central Poland. It lies approximately 3 km (2 mi) north-west of Słupia, 25 km (16 mi) west of Jędrzejów, and 56 km (35 mi) south-west of the regional capital Kielce.
