= Kamień Śląski =

Kamień Śląski Groß Stein
- Village
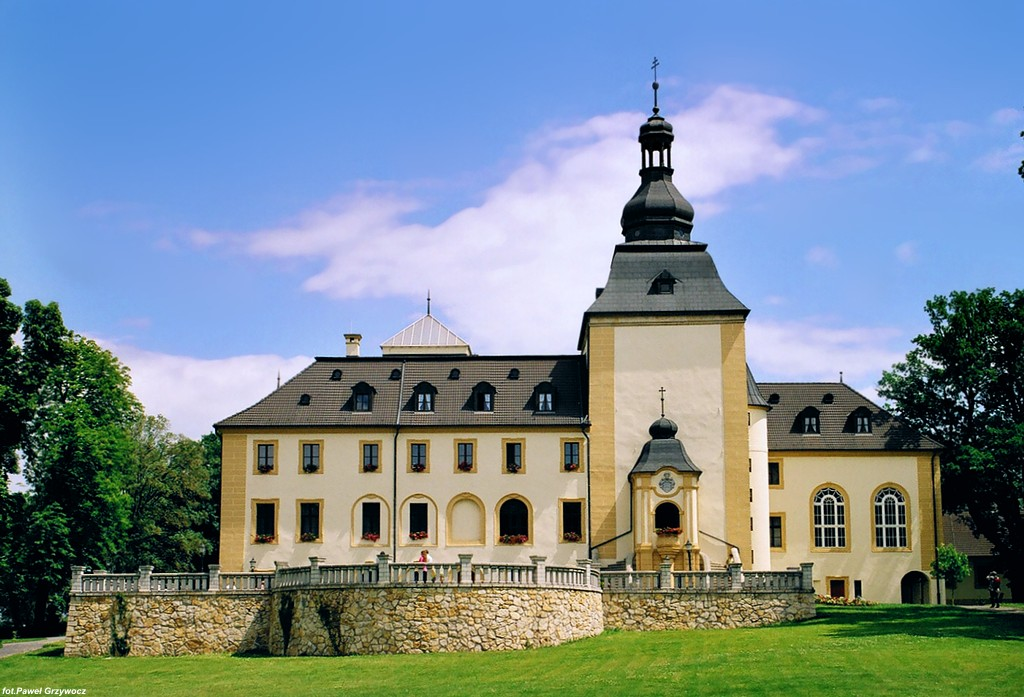
- Palace

- Location within Poland
- Coordinates: 50°33′N 18°5′E
- Country: Poland
- Voivodeship: Opole
- County: Krapkowice
- Gmina: Gogolin
- First mentioned: 12th century

Population
  - Total: 1,500
- Time zone: UTC+1 (CET)
  - Summer (DST): UTC+2 (CEST)
- Postal code: 47-325
- Vehicle registration: OKR
- Website: http://www.kamienslaski.pl

Kamień Śląski (Polish pronunciation: [ˈkamjɛj̃ ˈɕlɔ̃skʲi], additional name in German: Groß Stein) is a village in the administrative district of Gmina Gogolin, within Krapkowice County, Opole Voivodeship, in southern Poland.

The main landmarks of Kamień Śląski are the local palace, which houses a sanctuary dedicated to Saint Hyacinth of Poland, who was born in the village, and the Saint Hyacinth church.

== History ==
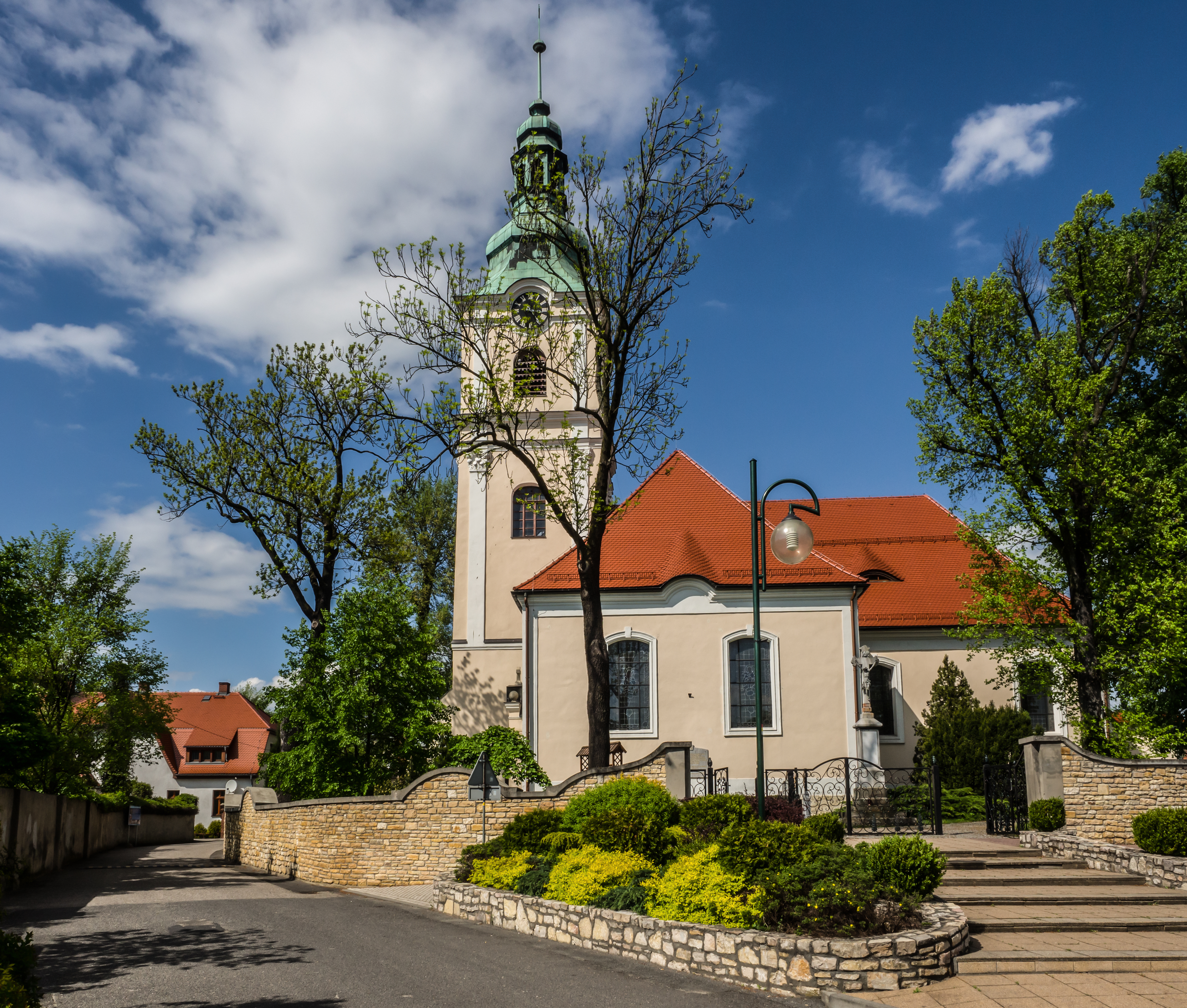
Saint Hyacinth church

The oldest known mention of the village comes from the early-12th-century Gesta principum Polonorum, the oldest Polish chronicle. It was mentioned as a seat of Polish ruler Bolesław III Wrymouth, both under the Latinized Polish name Kamencz and under the translated Latin name Lapis. The name is of Polish origin and means "stone". It was part of Piast-ruled Poland, and was owned by the Odrowąż family. Later on, it was also part of Bohemia, Prussia and Germany.

After the restoration of independent Poland after World War I in 1918, the local Polish majority made efforts to reintegrate the village with Poland. In the local elections in 1919, Poles won 11 out of 12 seats. During the Second Silesian Uprising, the village was easily captured by the Poles. Despite the Upper Silesia plebiscite of 1921, in which 55,3% voted in favour of rejoining Poland, the village was assigned to Germany, and soon afterwards it was the place of bloody fights during the Third Silesian Uprising. A German unit committed a crime and murdered five Polish civilians. In May 1921 the village passed between the fighting sides several times, before it was eventually seized by the Germans, while Polish insurgents retained control of the local railway station. Fights ended on May 31, 1921, when French troops entered the village and established a neutral zone. In the final stages of World War II, in January 1945, Soviet troops entered the village and plundered the St. Hyacinth chapel, and afterwards the village was restored to Poland.

In 2012, the St. Hyacinth church in Kamień Śląski received church bells from the closed and demolished former Polish and Redemptorist monastery in Bochum, Germany.

== Notable residents ==
- Ceslaus Odrowąż (ca. 1180–ca. 1242), Polish Dominican priest, Blessed of the Catholic Church
- Hyacinth of Poland (ca. 1183–1257), Polish Dominican priest and missionary, founder of the first Dominican monastery in Poland (in Kraków), Saint of the Catholic Church
- Bronislava of Poland (c. 1203–1259), Polish nun of the Premonstratensian Order, Blessed of the Catholic Church
- Hyazinth Graf Strachwitz (1893–1968), general
