= Wielkopole, Jędrzejów County =

Wielkopole
- Village
- Location within Poland
- Coordinates: 50°36′9″N 19°56′26″E
- Country: Poland
- Voivodeship: Świętokrzyskie
- County: Jędrzejów
- Gmina: Słupia

Wielkopole [vjɛlkɔˈpɔlɛ] is a village in the administrative district of Gmina Słupia, within Jędrzejów County, Świętokrzyskie Voivodeship, in south-central Poland. It lies approximately 3 km (2 mi) west of Słupia, 26 km (16 mi) west of Jędrzejów, and 57 km (35 mi) south-west of the regional capital Kielce.
