= Nowa Wieś, Gmina Słupia =

Nowa Wieś
- Village
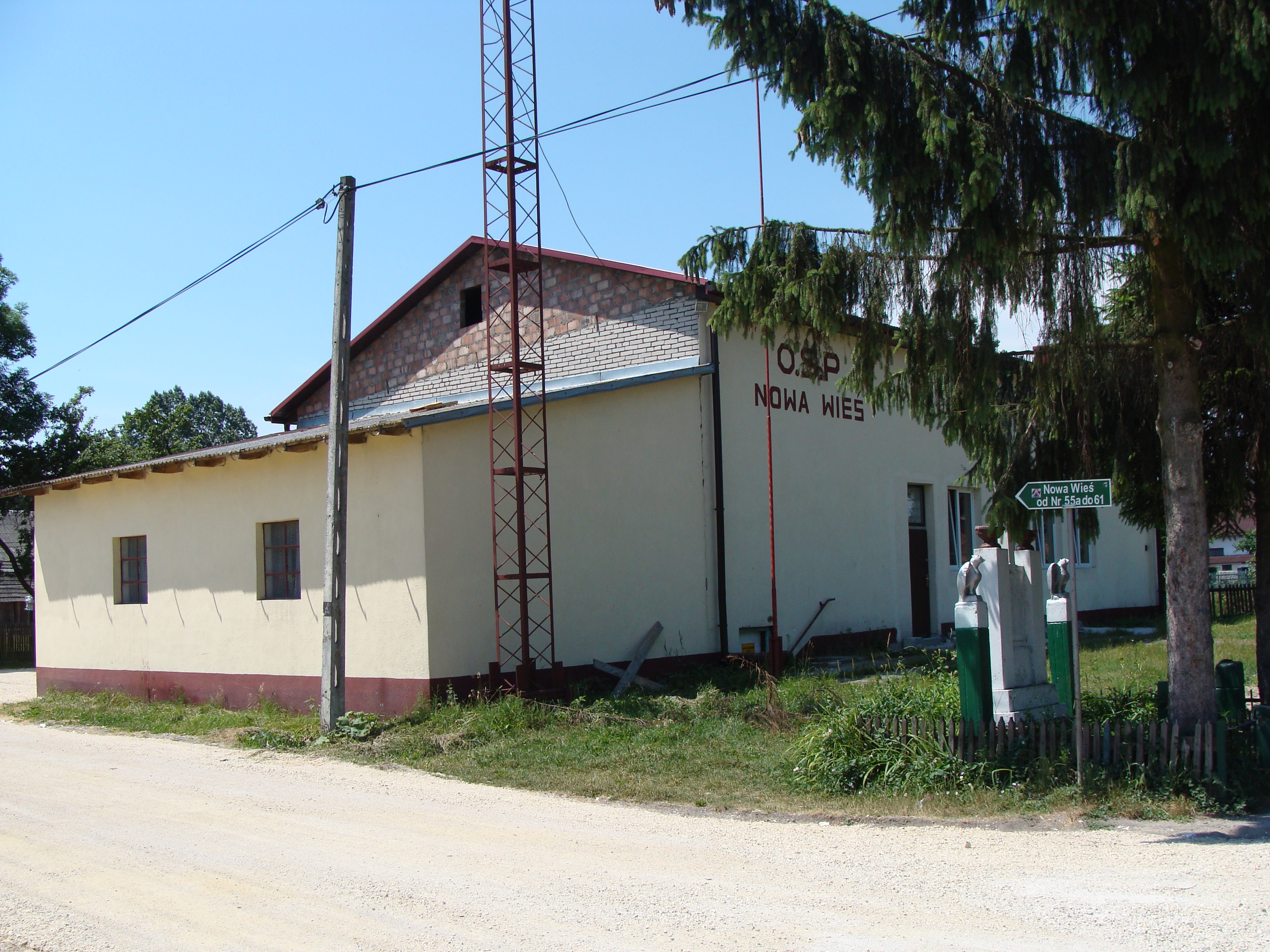
- Fire station

- Location within Poland
- Coordinates: 50°35′18″N 19°59′48″E
- Country: Poland
- Voivodeship: Świętokrzyskie
- County: Jędrzejów
- Gmina: Słupia

Nowa Wieś [ˈnɔva ˈvjɛɕ] is a village in the administrative district of Gmina Słupia, within Jędrzejów County, Świętokrzyskie Voivodeship, in south-central Poland. It lies approximately 3 km (2 mi) south-east of Słupia, 23 km (14 mi) west of Jędrzejów, and 55 km (34 mi) south-west of the regional capital Kielce.
