= Jasieniec =

Jasieniec may refer to the following places:

- Jasieniec, Lublin Voivodeship (east Poland)
- Jasieniec, Grójec County in Masovian Voivodeship (east-central Poland)
- Jasieniec, Świętokrzyskie Voivodeship (south-central Poland)
- Jasieniec, Kozienice County in Masovian Voivodeship (east-central Poland)
- Jasieniec, Sochaczew County in Masovian Voivodeship (east-central Poland)
- Jasieniec, Wyszków County in Masovian Voivodeship (east-central Poland)
- Jasieniec, Greater Poland Voivodeship (west-central Poland)
- Jasieniec, Silesian Voivodeship (south Poland)
- Jasieniec, Lubusz Voivodeship (west Poland)
- Jasieniec, Pomeranian Voivodeship (north Poland)
- Jasieniec, Warmian-Masurian Voivodeship (north Poland)
