= Ceslaus =

Polish saint

Blessed Czesław Odrowąż OP
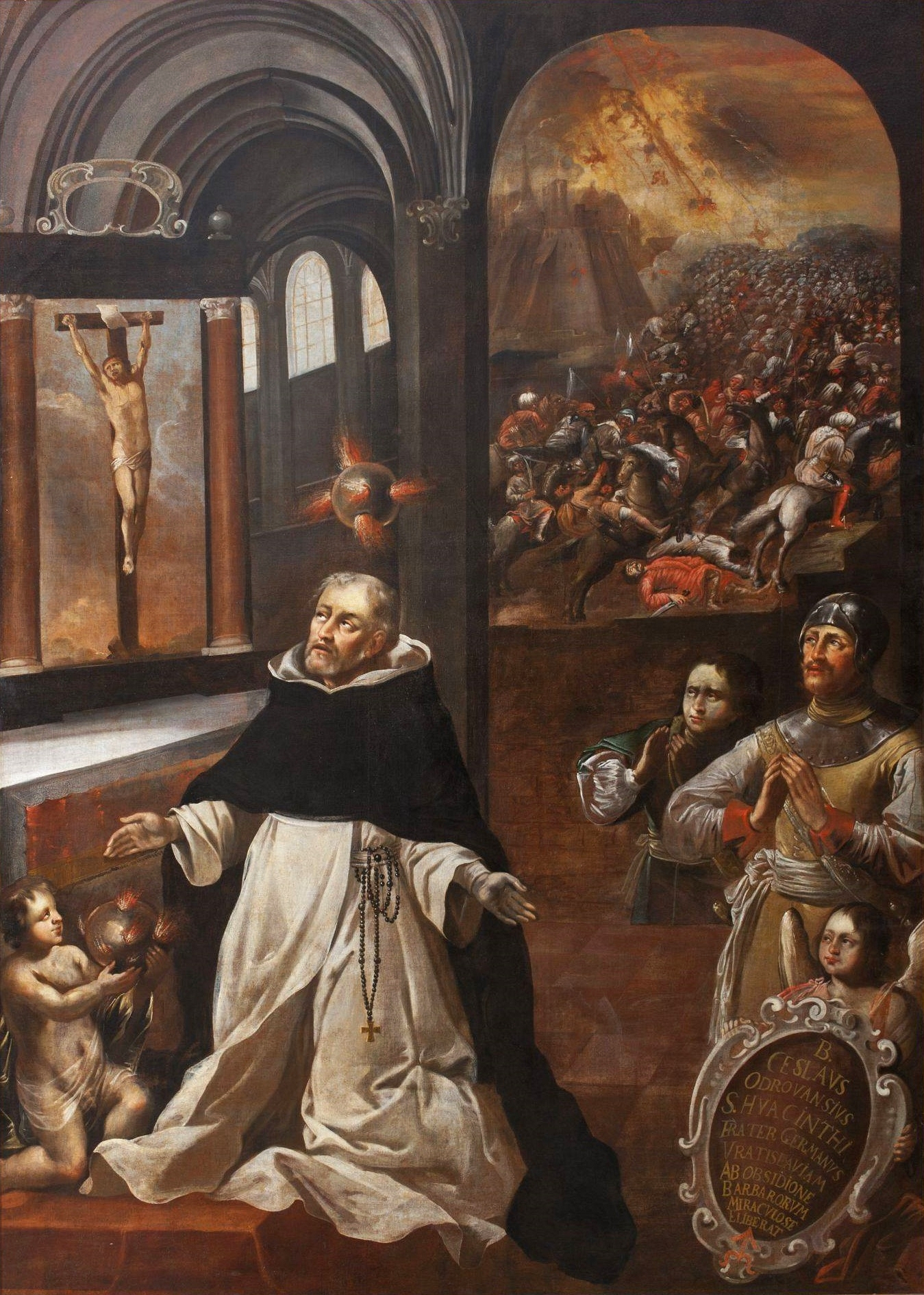
- Painting by Tomasz Jan Muszyński (1665)
- Born: c. 1184; Kamień Śląski, Silesia, Poland
- Died: 15 July 1242; Wrocław, Poland
- Venerated in: Roman Catholic Church
- Beatified: 27 August 1712, Saint Peter's Basilica, Papal States by Pope Clement XI
- Feast: 16 July

Ceslaus, (Polish: Czesław) (c. 1184 – c. 1242) was a Polish Dominican priest and missionary. He was beatified by the Catholic Church in 1713. Ceslaus was born in Kamień Śląski, Poland, of the noble family of Odrowąż, and was a relative, possibly the brother, of Hyacinth of Poland.

== Biography ==
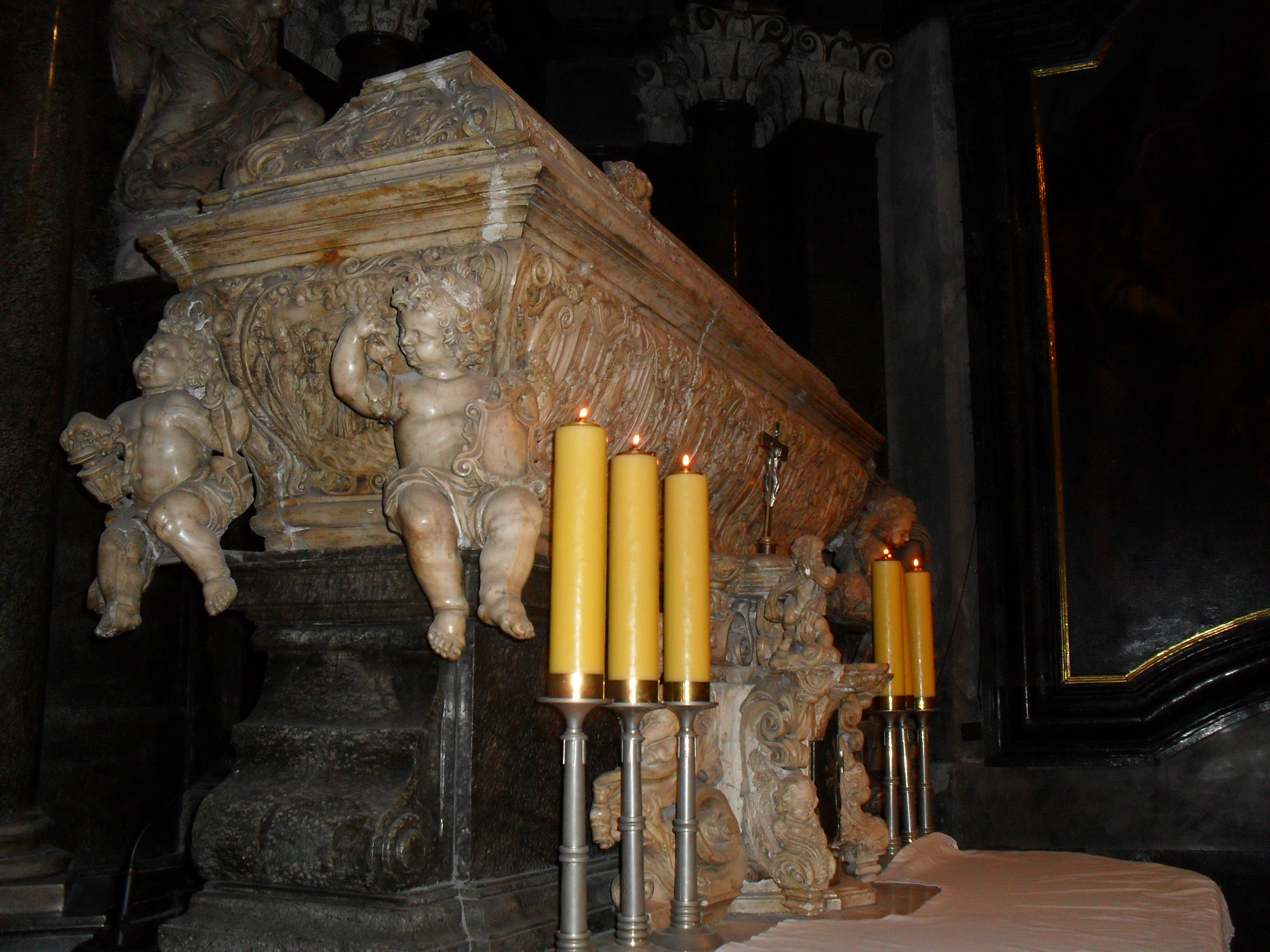
The tomb of Ceslaus in Wrocław

Having studied philosophy at Prague, he pursued his theological and juridical studies at the University of Bologna, after which he returned to Kraków, where he held the office of canon and custodian of the church of Sandomierz.

About 1218 he accompanied his uncle Ivo, Bishop of Kraków, to Rome. Hearing of the great sanctity of Dominic of Guzmán, who had recently been attributed the miracle of resuscitating the nephew of Cardinal Stefano di Fossa Nova who had been killed in a fall from his horse, Ceslaus, together with Hyacinth, sought admission into the Order of Friars Preachers.

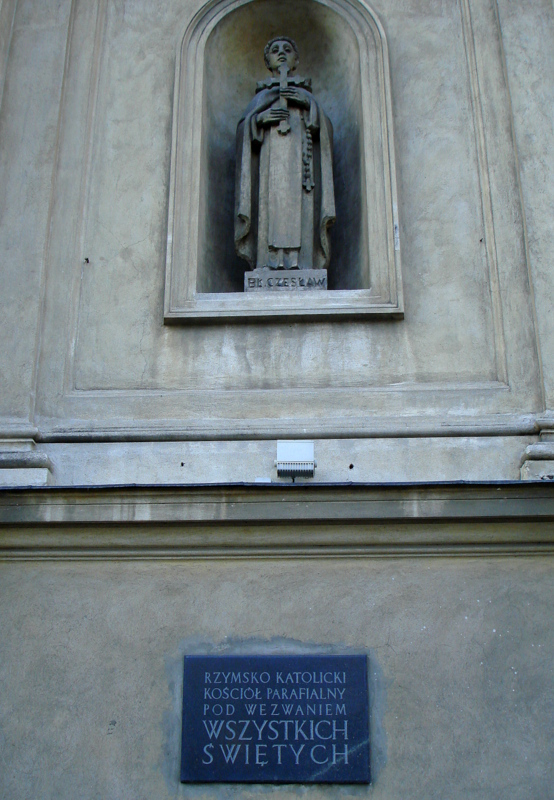
All Saints Church, Warsaw

In 1219 Pope Honorius III invited Dominic and his companions to take up residence at the ancient Roman basilica of Santa Sabina, which they did by early 1220. Hyacinth and Ceslaus along with their companions Herman and Henry were among the first to enter the studium of the Dominican Order at Rome out of which would grow the 16th-century College of Saint Thomas at Santa Maria sopra Minerva and the Pontifical University of Saint Thomas Aquinas, Angelicum in the 20th century. After an abbreviated novitiate Ceslaus, Hyacinth and their companions received the religious habit of the Order from Dominic himself in 1220.

Their novitiate completed, Dominic sent the young friars back as missionaries to their own country. Establishing a friary at Friesach in Austria, they proceeded to Kraków whence Ceslaus was sent by Hyacinth to Prague, the metropolis of Bohemia.

Labouring with much fruit throughout the Diocese of Prague, Ceslaus went to Wrocław, where he founded a large priory, and then extended his missionary labours over a vast territory, embracing Bohemia, Poland, Pomerania, and Saxony.

Sometime after the death of Hyacinth he was chosen the Provincial Superior for Poland. Whilst he was superior of the convent of Wrocław all Poland was threatened by the Mongols. The city of Wrocław being besieged, the people sought the aid of Ceslaus, who by his prayers miraculously averted the impending calamity. Four persons are said to have been raised to life by him. He died at Wrocław. His tomb is located in the Church of St. Adalbert in Wrocław.

Having always been venerated as a blessed, his cult was finally confirmed by Pope Clement XI in 1713. His feast is celebrated throughout the Dominican Order on 16 July.
