= Raszków, Świętokrzyskie Voivodeship =

Raszków
- Village
- Location within Poland
- Coordinates: 50°34′53″N 19°56′3″E
- Country: Poland
- Voivodeship: Świętokrzyskie
- County: Jędrzejów
- Gmina: Słupia

Raszków [ˈraʂkuf] is a village in the administrative district of Gmina Słupia, within Jędrzejów County, Świętokrzyskie Voivodeship, in south-central Poland. It lies approximately 4 km (2 mi) south-west of Słupia, 27 km (17 mi) west of Jędrzejów, and 59 km (37 mi) south-west of the regional capital Kielce.
