= Nowy Węgrzynów =

- Village
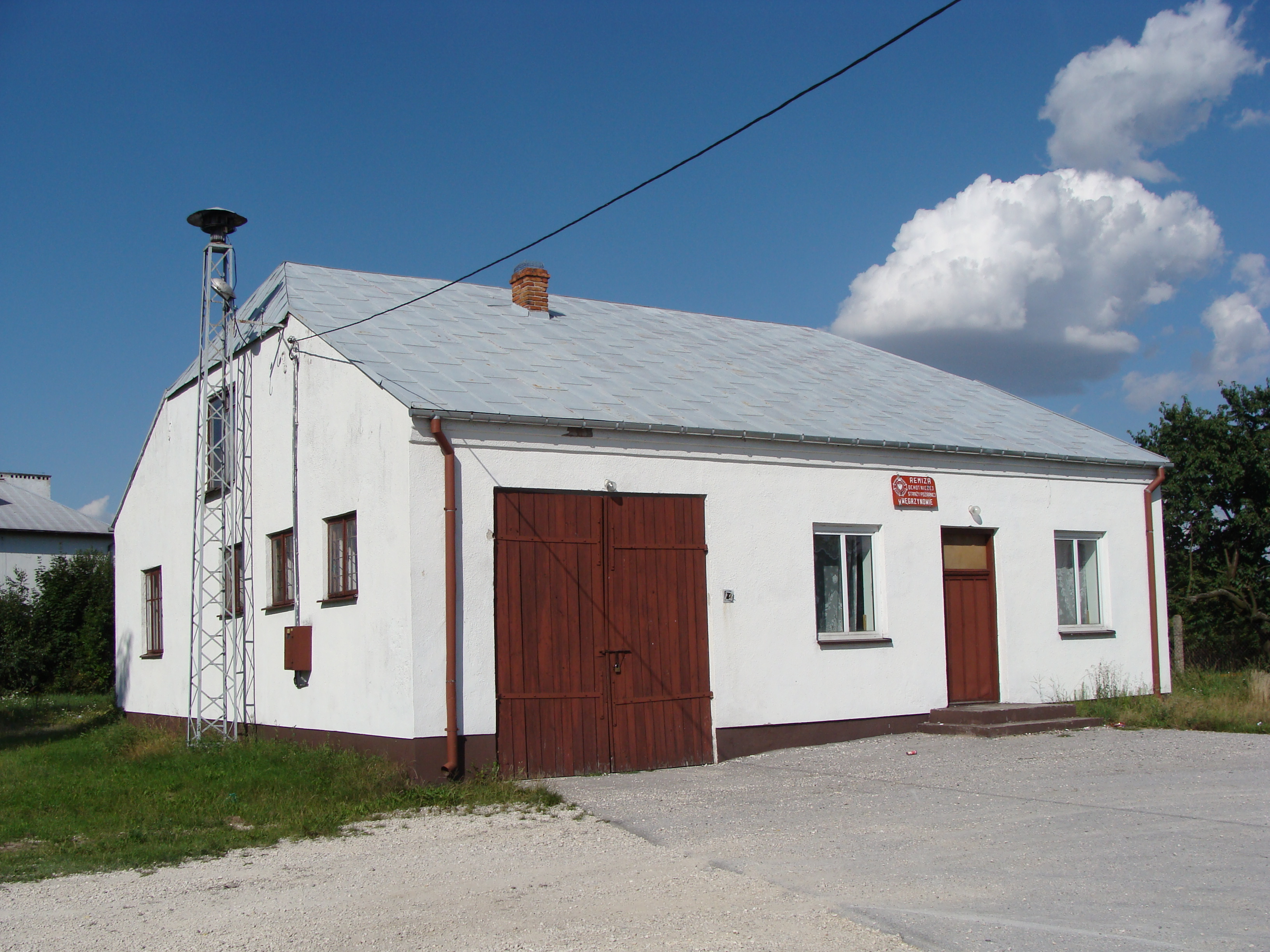
- Fire station

- Location within Poland
- Coordinates: 50°33′25″N 19°53′57″E
- Country: Poland
- Voivodeship: Świętokrzyskie
- County: Jędrzejów
- Gmina: Słupia
- Population: 250

Nowy Węgrzynów [ˈnɔvɨ vɛŋˈɡʐɨnuf] is a village located in south-central Poland, in the administrative district of Gmina Słupia, within Jędrzejów County, Świętokrzyskie Voivodeship. It lies approximately 8 km (5 mi) south-west of Słupia, 30 km (19 mi) west of Jędrzejów, and 63 km (39 mi) south-west of the regional capital Kielce.
