= Stary Węgrzynów =

- Village
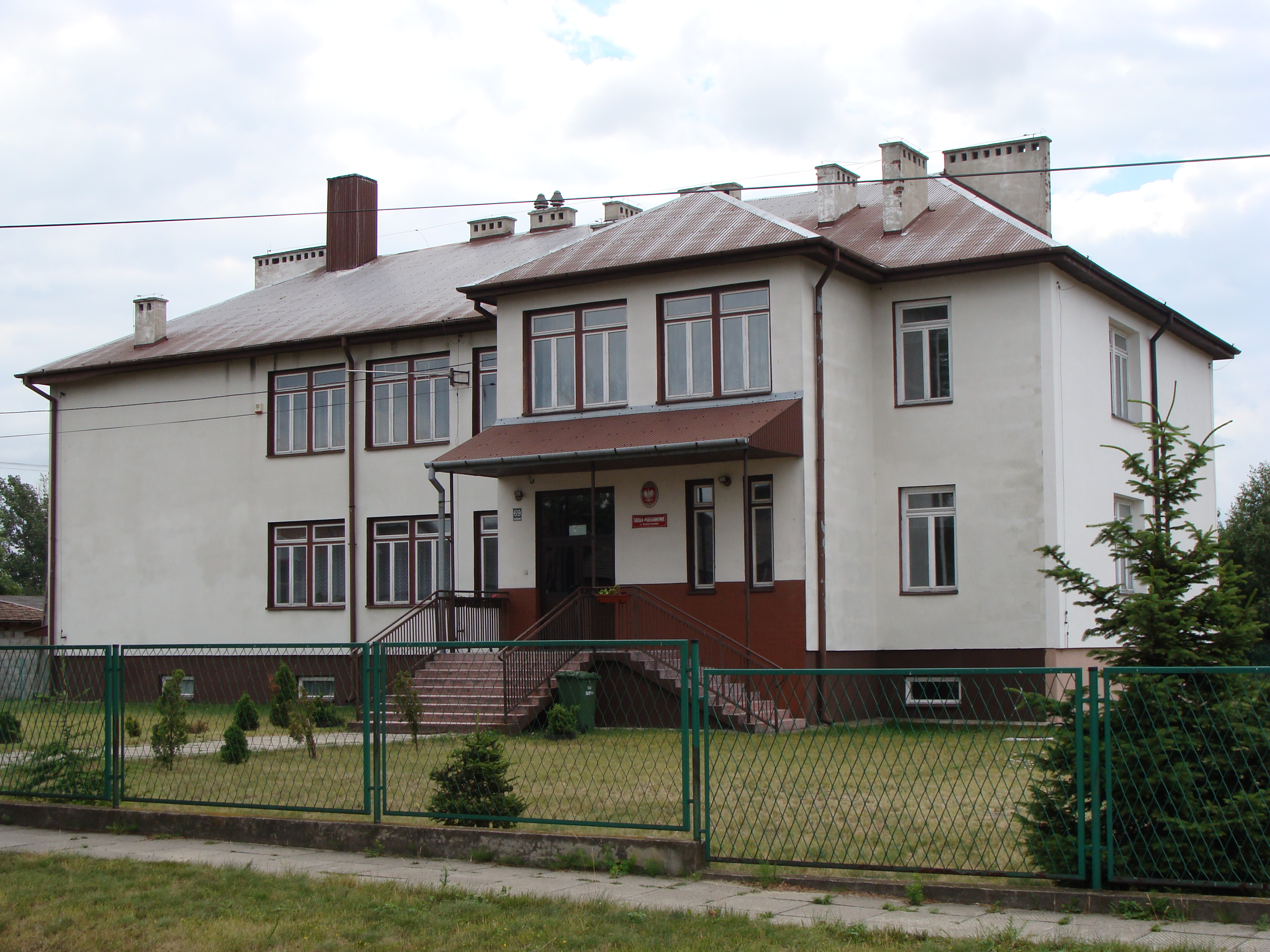
- School

- Location within Poland
- Coordinates: 50°33′41″N 19°54′21″E
- Country: Poland
- Voivodeship: Świętokrzyskie
- County: Jędrzejów
- Gmina: Słupia

Stary Węgrzynów [ˈstarɨ vɛŋˈɡʐɨnuf] is a village in the administrative district of Gmina Słupia, within Jędrzejów County, Świętokrzyskie Voivodeship, in south-central Poland. It lies approximately 7 km (4 mi) south-west of Słupia, 29 km (18 mi) west of Jędrzejów, and 62 km (39 mi) south-west of the regional capital Kielce.
