= Jasieniec, Świętokrzyskie Voivodeship =

Jasieniec
- Village
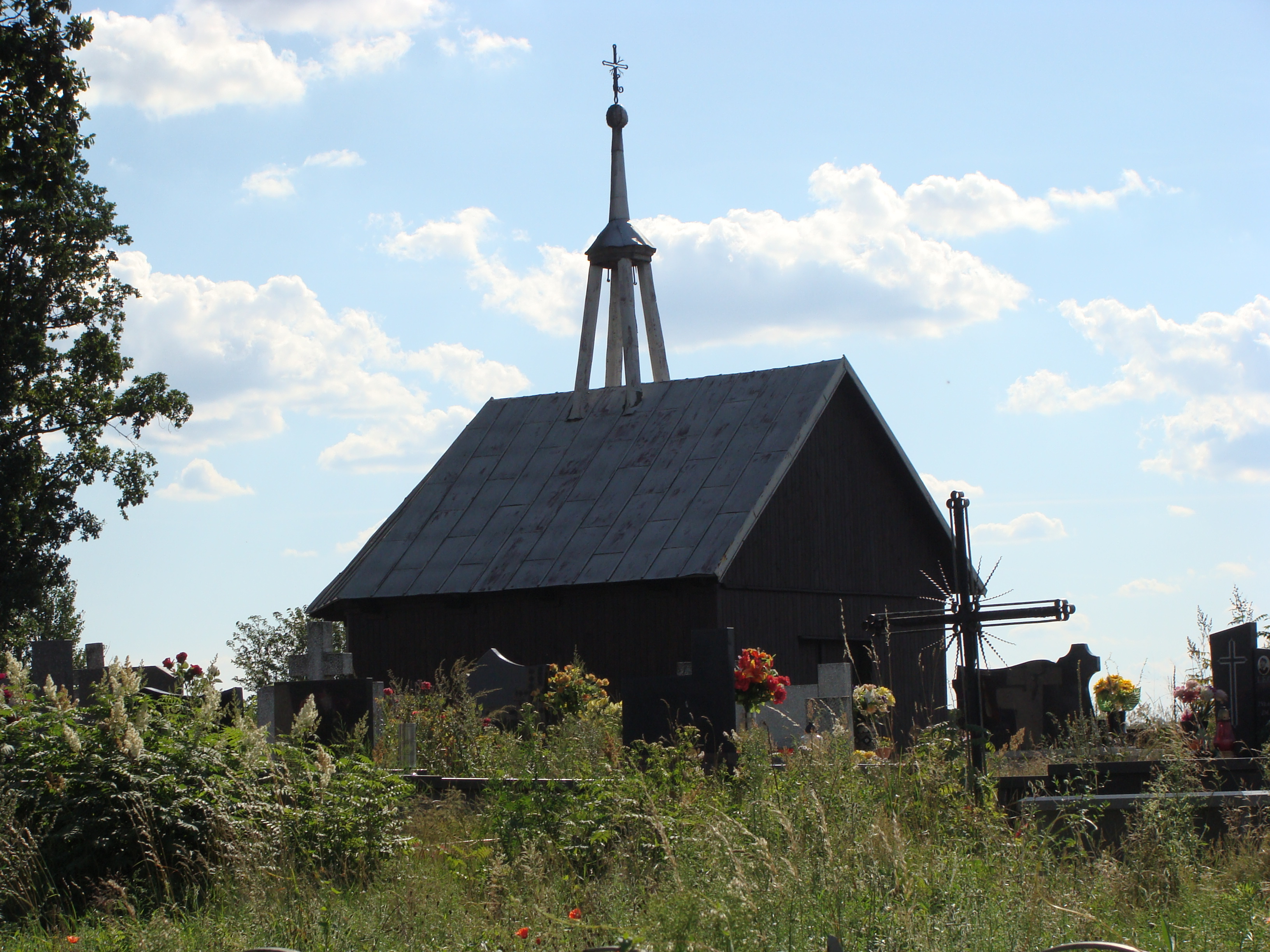
- Cemetery

- Location within Poland
- Coordinates: 50°33′21″N 19°52′28″E
- Country: Poland
- Voivodeship: Świętokrzyskie
- County: Jędrzejów
- Gmina: Słupia
- Population: 280

Jasieniec [jaˈɕɛɲɛt͡s] is a village in the administrative district of Gmina Słupia, within Jędrzejów County, Świętokrzyskie Voivodeship, in south-central Poland. It lies approximately 9 km (6 mi) south-west of Słupia, 32 km (20 mi) west of Jędrzejów, and 64 km (40 mi) south-west of the regional capital Kielce.
