= Dąbrowica, Świętokrzyskie Voivodeship =

Village in Poland

Dąbrowica
- Village
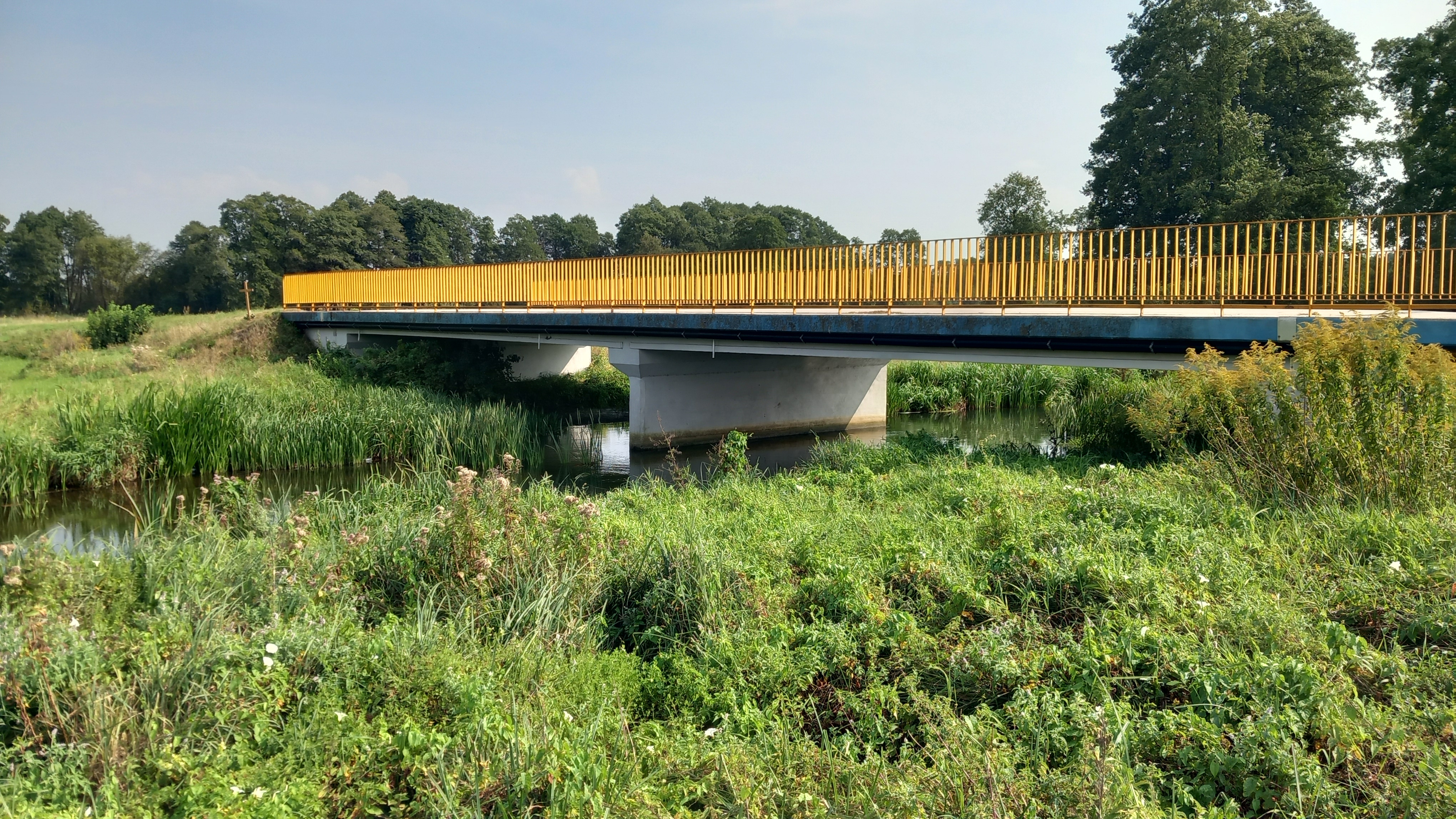
- Bridge

- Location within Poland
- Coordinates: 50°33′45″N 19°50′4″E
- Country: Poland
- Voivodeship: Świętokrzyskie
- County: Jędrzejów
- Gmina: Słupia

Dąbrowica [dɔmbrɔˈvit͡sa] is a village in the administrative district of Gmina Słupia, within Jędrzejów County, Świętokrzyskie Voivodeship, in south-central Poland. It lies approximately 11 km (7 mi) southwest of Słupia, 34 km (21 mi) west of Jędrzejów, and 66 km (41 mi) southwest of the regional capital Kielce.
