= Gmina Słupia, Jędrzejów County =

Gmina Słupia Słupia Commune
- Gmina
- Coat of arms
- Interactive map of Gmina Słupia
- Coordinates (Słupia): 50°36′3″N 19°58′28″E
- Country: Poland
- Voivodeship: Świętokrzyskie
- County: Jędrzejów
- Seat: Słupia

Area
  - Total: 107.88 km^{2} (41.65 sq mi)

Population (2006)
  - Total: 4,606
  - Density: 42.70/km^{2} (110.6/sq mi)
- Postal code: 28-350
- Car plates: TJE
- Website: www.slupia.pl

Gmina Słupia is a rural gmina (administrative district) in Jędrzejów County, Świętokrzyskie Voivodeship, in south-central Poland. Its seat is the village of Słupia, which lies approximately 24 kilometres (15 mi) west of Jędrzejów and 56 km (35 mi) south-west of the regional capital Kielce.

The gmina covers an area of 107.88 square kilometres (41.7 sq mi), and as of 2006 its total population is 4,606.

== Villages ==
Gmina Słupia contains the villages and settlements of Dąbrowica, Jasieniec, Nowa Wieś, Nowy Węgrzynów, Obiechów, Raszków, Rawka, Rożnica, Sieńsko, Słupia, Sprowa, Stary Węgrzynów, Wielkopole and Wywła.

== Neighbouring gminas ==
Gmina Słupia is bordered by the gminas of Moskorzew, Nagłowice, Sędziszów, Szczekociny and Żarnowiec.
