= Teofil Kopystynskyi =

Ukrainian painter, portraitist, restorer (1844–1916)

- Теофіл Копистинський
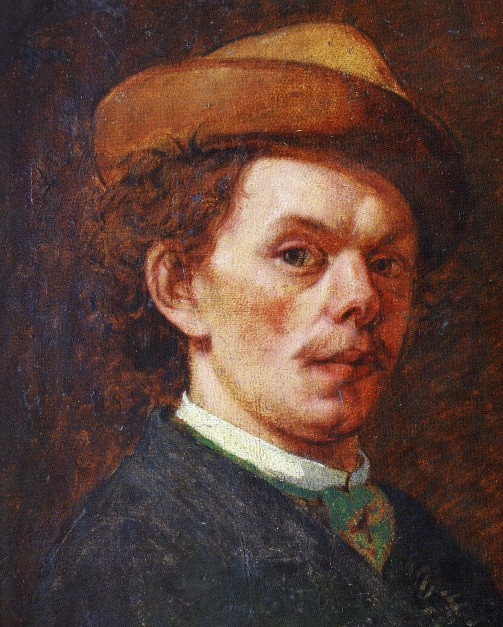
- Born: 15 April 1844; Przemyśl
- Died: 5 July 1916 (aged 72); Lviv
- Education: Kraków School of Drawing and Painting, Academy of Fine Arts Vienna
- Occupations: Painter, portraitist, restorer

Teofil Dorofiiovych Kopystynskyi (Ukrainian: Теофіл Дорофійович Копистинський; 15 April 1844 – 5 July 1916) was a Ukrainian realist painter, portraitist, and restorer.

== Biography ==
He was born in Przemyśl (now Poland) on 15 April 1844. From 1868 to 1871, he studied at the Kraków School of Drawing and Painting, and in 1872 he studied at the Academy of Fine Arts Vienna.

=== Stauropegion Institute ===
In 1873, he moved to Lviv, where he participated in exhibitions of the Society of Fine Arts Supporters and illustrated the magazine "Dzvinok". At the same time, he began his active collaboration with the Stauropegion Institute. At the request of the latter, the artist was engaged in the restoration of icons, church paintings, preparation of exhibitions, etc. In the 1870s and 1880s, Kopystynskyi also painted a gallery of portraits of clergy, public and historical figures, including Metropolitan Petro Mohyla (1885), Hetman Petro Konashevych-Sahaidachnyi (1886), and Prince Kostiantyn Ostrozkyi (1886), commissioned by the Council of the Stauropegion Institute. Among other things, he painted portraits of the famous figures of the Stauropegion Institute of that time.

The first of these was a portrait of Amvrosii Yanovskyi, a famous teacher, inspector of gymnasiums, and the first chairman of the Ukrainian Pedagogical Society (1872). There were seventeen such portraits in total, and they were created in the 1870s and 1880s. The exceptions were the portrait of Mykhailo Kachkovskyi (1891), which remained unfinished, as well as portraits of Yosyf Delkevych (ca. 1895) and Lev Matselinskyi (1897). The latter was made by the artist from photography, which he had practiced many times.

Most of the portraits have survived to this day, and like other collections of the Stauropegion Institute, after 1939 they were distributed between the LIM and the Andrey Sheptytsky National Museum of Lviv.Дніпро. — 1995. — № 5—6. — С. 144. Кучинська Л. Теофіл Копистинський-реставратор: окремі спостереження // Бюлетень. Інформаційний випуск Львівської філій Національного науково-дослідного реставраційного центру України.— Львів, № 1 (11) грудень 2010. — С. 204—211. Купчинська Л. Творчість Теофіла Копистинського у контексті розвитку образотворчого мистецтва західноукраїнських земель другої половини XIX — початку ХХ століть. — Львів; Філадельфія, 2009. — ISBN 978-966-02-4283-8.

=== Further fate ===
Later, as a restorer, Kopystynskyi was known for his restoration works in the Bernardine Fathers' Church in Leżajsk (1896), the Cathedral Church of Saints Stanisław and Wencesław in Wawel, the Church of the Assumption of the Blessed Virgin Mary in Kraków (1897–1898), and the churches of St. Andrew (1883), Maria Snizhna, and St. Martin (1886) in Lviv. In addition, he developed and proposed a methodology for the restoration of Leonardo da Vinci's fresco "Last Supper" in Milan.

During the last years of his life, he lived in a shelter for the elderly run by the Robert Doms Foundation, located at 4 St. Theresa Street (now Mytropolyt Andrei Street, 10).

Kopystynskyi died in 1916. He was buried in Lychakiv Cemetery in Lviv (field No. 63).

== Honoring ==
In 1992, one of the streets in the Frankivskyi District of Lviv was named in honor of Kopystynskyi.

== Bibliography ==
- Kopystynskyi Teofil Dorofiiovych / Y. O. Biriulov // Encyclopedia of Modern Ukraine [Online] / Eds. : I. М. Dziuba, A. I. Zhukovsky, M. H. Zhelezniak [et al.] ; National Academy of Sciences of Ukraine, Shevchenko Scientific Society. – Kyiv : The NASU institute of Encyclopedic Research, 2014.
- Дніпро. — 1995. — № 5—6. — С. 144.
- Кучинська Л. Теофіл Копистинський-реставратор: окремі спостереження // Бюлетень. Інформаційний випуск Львівської філій Національного науково-дослідного реставраційного центру України.— Львів, № 1 (11) грудень 2010. — С. 204—211.
- Купчинська Л. Творчість Теофіла Копистинського у контексті розвитку образотворчого мистецтва західноукраїнських земель другої половини XIX — початку ХХ століть. — Львів; Філадельфія, 2009. — ISBN 978-966-02-4283-8.
