= Jan Sprowski =

Polish Catholic bishop

His Excellency Jan Sprowski
- Archbishop of Gniezno; Primate of Poland
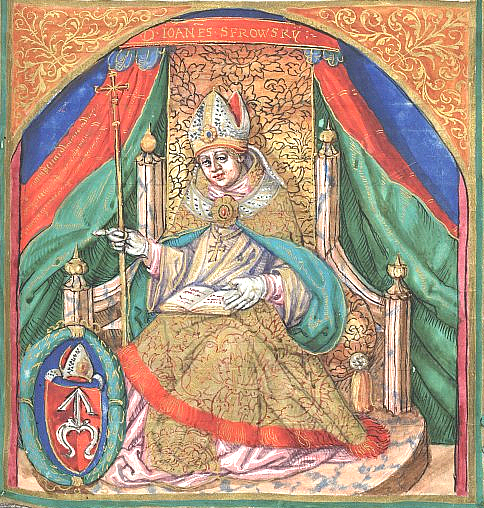
- Church: Roman Catholic
- Archdiocese: Gniezno
- Installed: 1453
- Term ended: 1464

Orders
- Consecration: 1453

Personal details
- Born: 1411
- Died: 1464 (aged 52–53) Kraków
- Coat of arms

Jan ze Sprowy (?-1464) Jan Sprowski or as John of Odrowąż (John Odrowąż from Sprowa) was a 15th-century Roman Catholic Archbishop of Gniezno, and Primate of Poland and Lithuania.

He was a Canon of Kraków, Gniezno, and Poznań and a member of the Royal Secretary from 1450 until 1453. He was appointed Archbishop of Gniezno and Primate of Poland from 1453 to 1464 where he was a protégé and supporter of King Casimir IV Jagiellon.

As Primate he called 3 synods, in 1456, 1457 and a third in 1459. In 1460 he founded the chapel of the Annunciation, (today Corpus Christi) at the Cathedral of the Assumption of the Blessed Virgin Mary in Gniezno. He died on 14 April 1464.
