= Hyacinth of Poland =

Polish Dominican priest and missionary

Saint Hyacinth OP
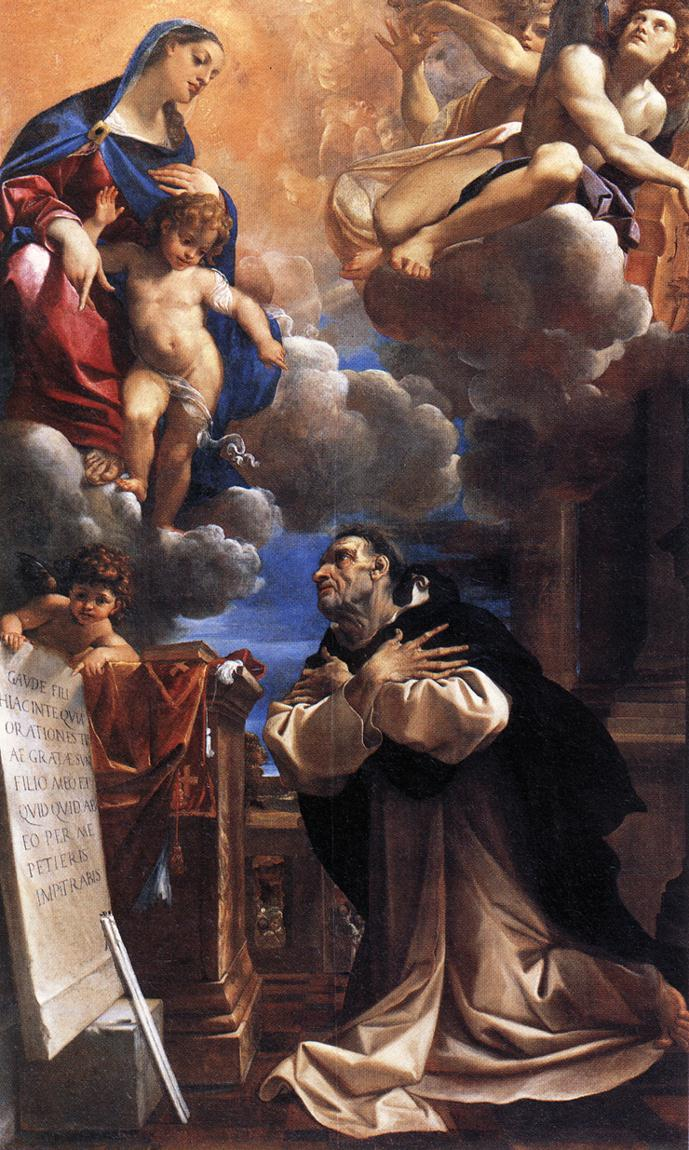
- Apparition of the Virgin to Saint Hyacinth, Ludovico Carracci (1592), in the Louvre Museum
- Born: c. 1185; Kamień Śląski, Silesia, Poland
- Died: 15 August 1257; Kraków, Lesser Poland, Poland
- Venerated in: Roman Catholic Church, Aglipayan Church
- Canonized: 17 April 1594 by Pope Clement VIII
- Feast: 17 August
- Attributes: Holding a statue of the Blessed Virgin Mary along with a monstrance or ciborium

Hyacinth (Polish: Święty Jacek, born Jacek Odrowąż; c. 1185 – 15 August 1257) was a Polish Dominican priest and missionary. He is venerated as a saint, who worked to reform the women's monasteries in his native Poland. Educated in Paris and Bologna, he was a Doctor of Sacred Studies. Saint Hyacinth's feast day is 17 August.

== Life ==
Called the "Apostle of the North", Hyacinth was the son of Eustachius Koński of the noble House of Odrowąż. He was born in 1185 at the castle of Lanka, at Kamień, in Silesia. A near relative of Ceslaus, he made his studies in notable cities: Kraków, Prague, and Bologna, and at the latter place merited the title of Doctor of Law and Divinity. On his return to Poland he was given a prebend at Sandomierz, a medieval centre of administration in the south-eastern part of the country. He subsequently accompanied his uncle Iwo Odrowąż, the Bishop of Kraków, to Rome.

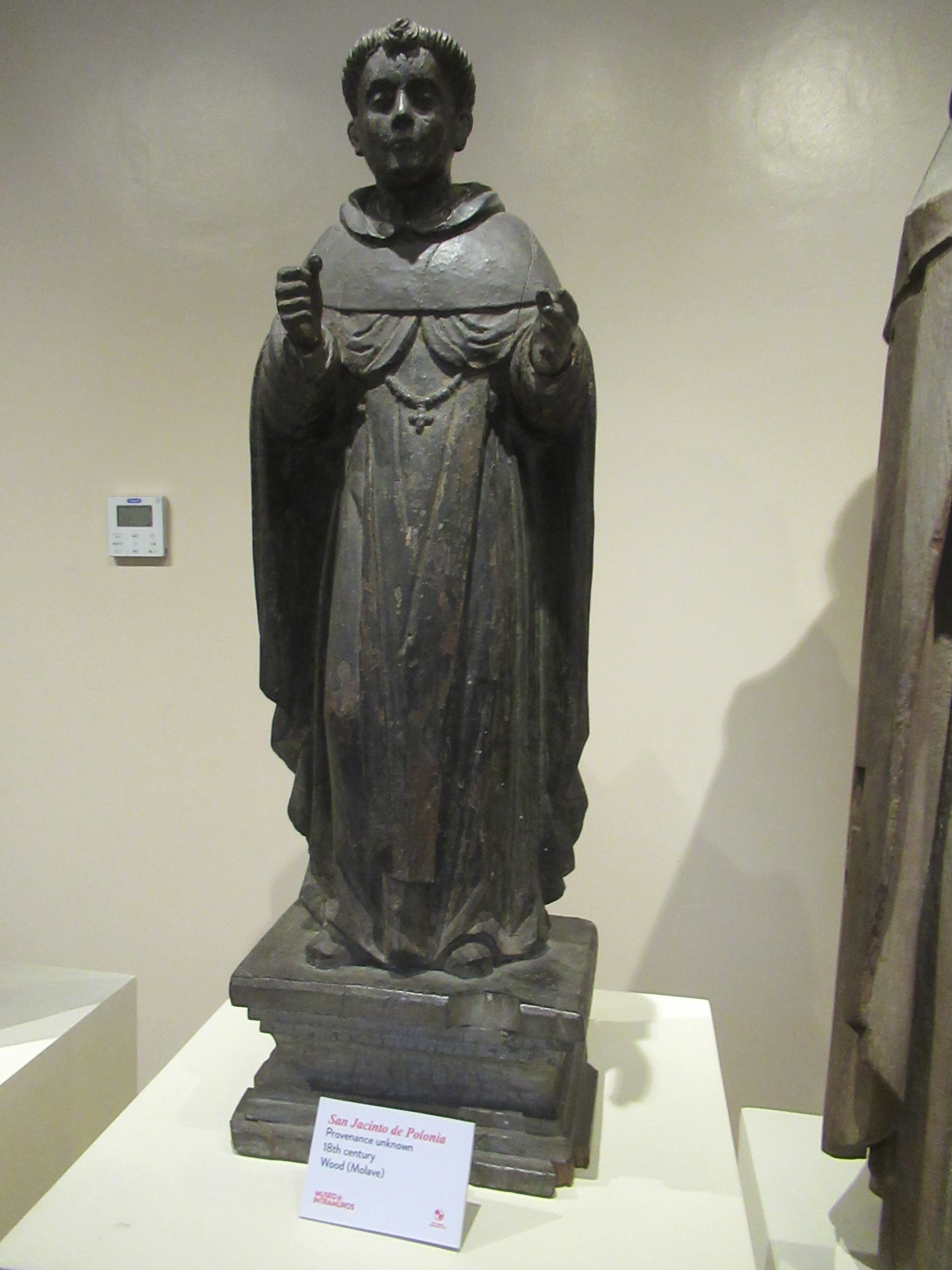
18th century Vitex parviflora statue of Hyacinth

While in Rome, he claimed to have witnessed a miracle performed by Dominic of Osma, and became a Dominican friar, along with Ceslaus and two attendants of the Bishop of Kraków, Herman and Henry. In 1219 Pope Honorius III invited Dominic and his followers to take up residence at the ancient Roman basilica of Santa Sabina, which they did by early 1220. Before that time, the friars had only a temporary residence in Rome at the convent of San Sisto Vecchio which Honorius III had given to Dominic in about 1218, intending it to be used for a reformation of Roman nuns under Dominic's guidance. Hyacinth and his companions were among the first to enter the convent. They were also the first alumni of the studium of the Dominican Order at Santa Sabina out of which would grow the 16th century College of Saint Thomas at Santa Maria sopra Minerva, which became the Pontifical University of Saint Thomas Aquinas in the 20th century. After an abbreviated novitiate, Hyacinth and his companions received the religious habit of the Order from Dominic himself in 1220.

The young friars were then sent back to their homeland to establish the Dominican Order in Poland and Kyiv. As Hyacinth and his three companions traveled back to Kraków, he set up new monasteries with his companions as superiors, until finally he was the only one left to continue on to Kraków. Hyacinth went throughout Northern Europe spreading the faith. He died in the year 1257. Tradition holds that he also evangelized throughout Sweden, Norway, Denmark, Prussia, Scotland, Russia, Turkey, and Greece. However, these travels are heavily disputed and are not supported by the earliest hagiographies of Hyacinth.

== Legend ==
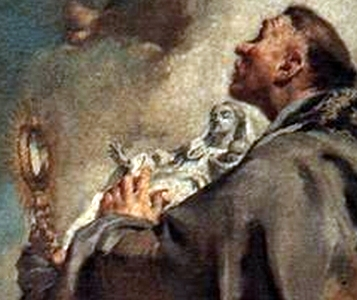
Hyacinth with a monstrance and a statue of Mary, a detail from Three Dominican Saints by Giovanni Battista Piazzetta (1738), in the Gesuati Church, Venice, Italy

One of the major miracles attributed to Hyacinth came about during the 1240 Siege of Kiev. As the friars prepared to flee the invading forces, Hyacinth went to save the ciborium containing the Eucharist from the tabernacle in the monastery's chapel, when he heard the voice of Mary, asking him to take her, too.

Hyacinth lifted the large, stone statue of Mary, as well as the ciborium. He was easily able to carry both, even though the statue weighed far more than he could normally lift. Thus, he saved them both. For this reason, he is usually shown holding a monstrance (though they did not come into use until several centuries later) and a statue of Mary.

The Polish exclamation Święty Jacku z pierogami! ("St. Hyacinth with his dumplings!") is an old-time saying, a call for help in some hopeless circumstance. It has derived from two legends. One of them is about his visit on July 13, 1238, to Kościelec. During his visit, a hailstorm broke out, destroying crops and leaving people with the prospect of famine. Hyacinth told them to pray. The next day, the crops were miraculously restored. The people then treated Hyacinth to pierogi made from those crops as a token of gratitude. The second legend mentions Hyacinth feeding people with pierogi during a famine caused by the Mongol invasion of 1241.

== Veneration ==
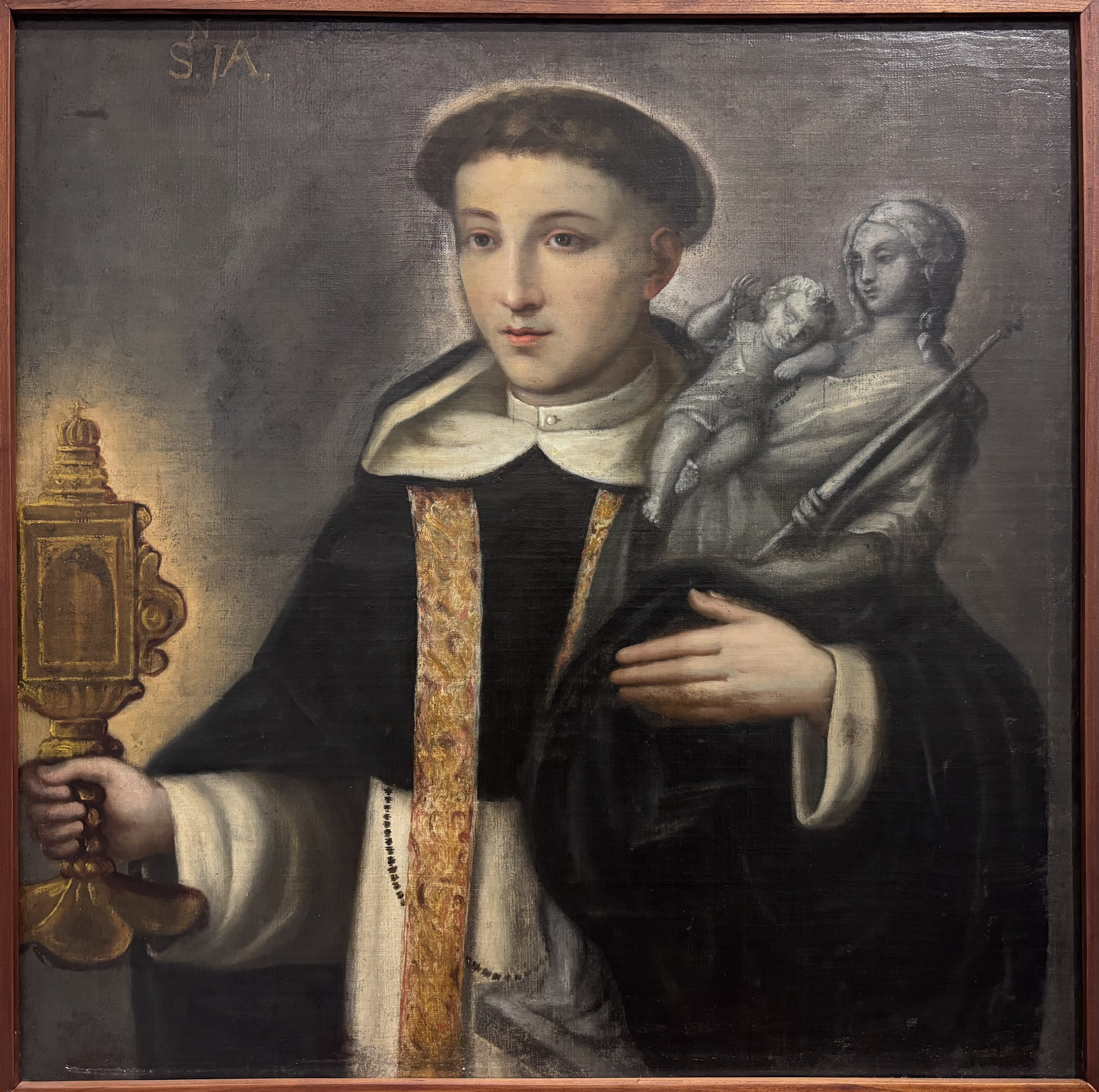
Saint Hyacinth of Poland (anonymous, 17th century). Santo Domingo Convent, Quito

The tomb of Hyacinth is in the Basilica of the Holy Trinity in Kraków, Poland, in a chapel that is dedicated to him.

Hyacinth was canonized on 17 April 1594 by Pope Clement VIII, and his feast is celebrated on 17 August. In 1686 Pope Innocent XI named him a patron of Lithuania. He is the patron saint of those in danger of drowning and weight lifting.

Among notable churches in North America dedicated to Hyacinth of Poland is the Basilica of St. Hyacinth in Chicago.

== In culture ==
Kraków's annual Pierogi Festival is held on St. Hyacinth's feast day, and the winner receives a statuette of him.

== See also ==
- Convent of Saint-Hyacinth, Fribourg
- Saint Hyacinth of Poland, patron saint archive
