= Bernardine Church, Lviv =

Monastery in Lviv, Ukraine

Coordinates: 49°50′22″N 24°2′5″E

St. Andrew church and the Bernardine monastery
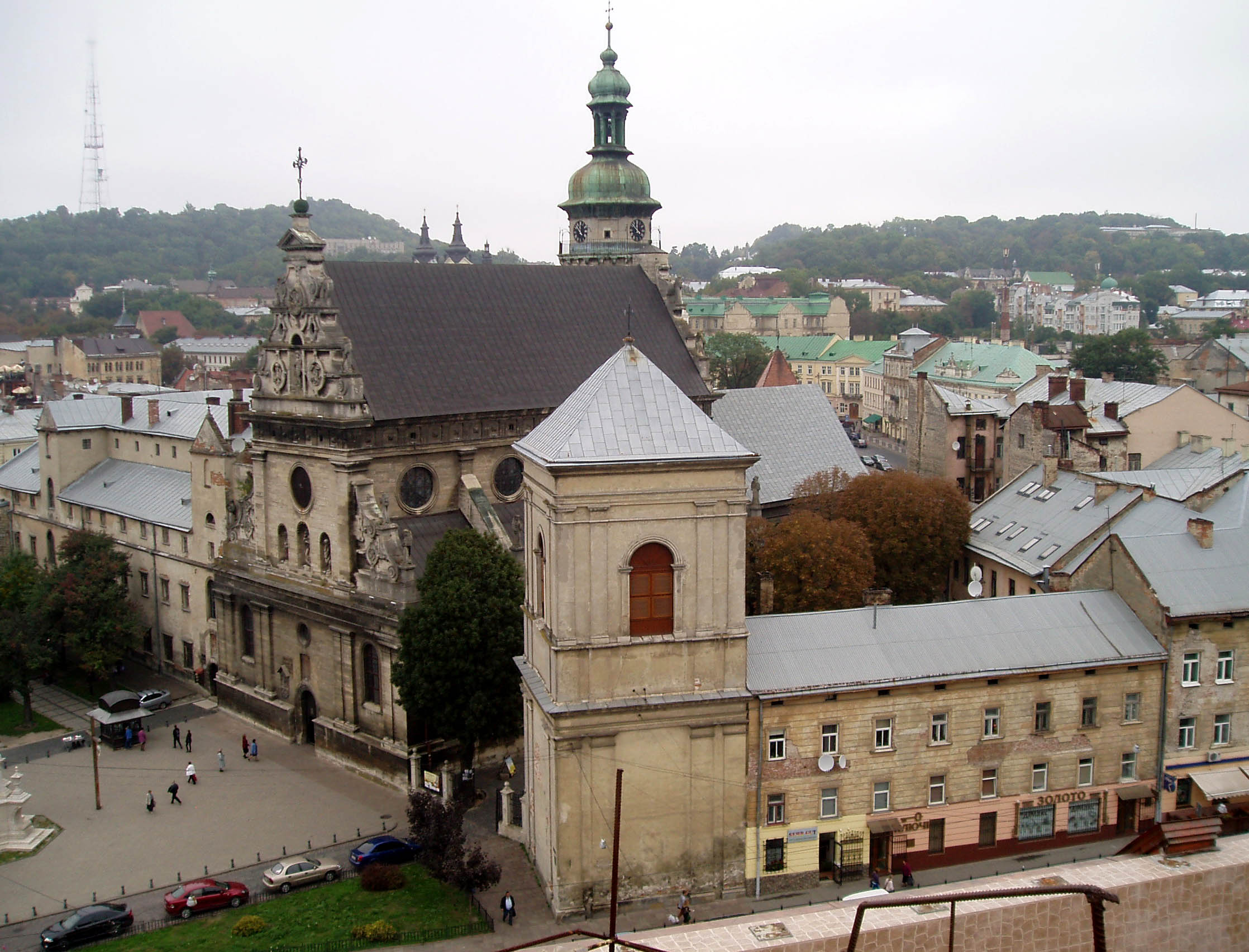
- Interactive map of the St. Andrew church and the Bernardine monastery area

General information
- Construction started: 1602
- Completed: 1620

Design and construction
- Architects: Bernard Avelides, Paolo Romano, and Ambrosius Nutclauss

The Bernardine church and monastery in Lviv, Ukraine, is located in the city's Old Town, south of the market square. It was designed by Paolo Dominici. The monastery along with the church of St. Andrew now belong to the Order of St. Basil the Great of the Ukrainian Greek Catholic Church.

== History ==
=== First church and monastery ===
The Franciscan Observantists, known in the region as Bernardines after their monastery in Kraków in order to distinguish them from Franciscan Conventuals, were invited to Lviv by Andrzej Odrowąż, who founded the first monastery in 1460 outside of the city walls.

The monastery was burned down in 1498, and then in 1509 by the Moldovan hospodar Bogdan III the One-Eyed. The church and monastery were rebuilt using the half-timbered (Prussian wall) technique. In 1521, the remains of John of Dukla were transferred from the crypt to a sarcophagus by the wall of the presbytery. In 1587, the monastic buildings were probably damaged during the raid on Lviv by Mikołaj Jazłowiecki.

=== Construction of the current church and monastery ===
In 1600, the Bernardine Order appealed to King Sigismund III Vasa for permission to rebuild the church and monastery and to incorporate them into the city fortifications. On 16 March 1603, a royal privilege was issued granting consent for the reconstruction. The reconstruction was supervised by Fr. Bernard Avelides, while the chief architect was Paolo Romano. The new church was built in the mannerist style. In 1608, a red marble tomb for the relics of John of Dukla was installed in the church; it was made by Wojciech Kapinos at the foundation of Mikołaj Daniłowicz.

The first part of the church was completed in 1609, but it did not gain approval, and the work was continued by the architect Ambrosius Nutclauss. The construction was supported by donations from soldiers returning from the Muscovite War. The presbytery was vaulted in 1613. The old church was demolished in 1614. The church was consecrated in 1620, and the high altar was erected in 1622. After the construction of the church, the monastic buildings were erected and, in the 1630s, were connected to the city walls.

In 1648, the city council of Lviv funded a silver votive plaque in the church in thanksgiving for the city’s salvation from the Khmelnytsky invasion. In the same spirit, a thanksgiving corona was placed at the tomb of John of Dukla for the deliverance of the city.

=== Beatification of John of Dukla ===
Indeterminate works on the church were carried out in 1714–15. In 1731, Jakub Schyling covered the church roof with tiles. In 1733–34, a bell tower was erected using funds from the testamentary bequest of Adam Mikołaj Sieniawski, the Castellan of Kraków. The beatification of John of Dukla on 21 January 1733 initiated Baroque changes in the church. In 1736, a column in front of the church was erected on which a statue of John of Dukla was placed. Tomasz Hutter and Konrad Kotschenreiter crafted a new main altar, as well as the altars of the Virgin Mary and St. Anthony. The tabernacle of the main altar was made by the carpenter Kazimierz Mieskiewicz, the woodcarver Michał Szczupakiewicz, and Marcin Groblicz. The frescoes were executed by Benedykt Mazurkiewicz.

At the same time, a number of smaller altars were also installed, and the floor was laid with black marble brought from Czerna near Kraków. In 1740, the solemn translation of the remains of John of Dukla took place, moving them from the altar of St. Anne, where they had been placed during the refurbishment, to the retable in the presbytery. Work on the church’s decoration continued until 1768. New frescoes were created in the sacristy and treasury by Franciszek Eckstein, and in the vestibule by Stanisław Stroiński. Between 1748 and 1755, a brick well of St. John of Dukla was constructed.

=== 19th century ===
After Lwów was occupied by the Austrians, the Bernardine convent was suppressed in 1785, but it was soon restored. At that time, the provincial archive was housed in the monastery buildings, occupying the eastern wing until 1926. In 1811, a new floor was laid using stone from Trembowla. At that time, Jakub Kramkowski built a new organ. The altars of St. Ivo and St. Stanislaus were also created. Throughout the 19th century, the church was decorated and renovated. The frescoes were restored by Marcin Jabłoński, and later by Aleksander Rodakowski. New paintings for the church were produced by, among others, Karol Schellein, Zofia Fredro, Maria Podlewska, and Korneli Szlegel.

On the occasion of the 400th anniversary of the death of John of Dukla, a thorough renovation of the church was carried out. Zachariasz Tabaczkowski restored the high altar, with painter Józef Fedorowicz and sculptor Tadeusz Sokulski working on the restoration of the retable. The frescoes and parts of the paintings were restored by Teofil Kopystynskyi and Józef Fedorowicz. Paintings were also restored by Stanisław Kotlarski. The organ was refurbished by Jan Śliwiński. In the following years, Józef Szydłowski painted the interior of the monastery chapel. In the 1890s, the roofs were replaced, the walls renovated, and architectural details reconstructed according to a design by Łukasz J. Bodaszewski, with the work supervised by Albin Zagórski.

=== Since 1914 ===
The church survived World War I unscathed. On 16 April 1919, it was damaged during the shelling of the city by Ukrainian artillery. Renovation work was carried out in the early 1920s according to a design by Witold Jakimowski. During the interwar period, the crypts and the church tower were restored. In 1938 the 10th Gymnasium vacated the monastery buildings and their interiors were rebuilt. Further work was interrupted by the outbreak of World War II. The Bernardine monks left the church and monastery on 25 April 1946.

The buildings remained unused for a long time. In the 1960s, they were taken over by the Lviv Art Gallery with the intention of establishing a museum of Baroque art, which, however, never materialized. In 1991, the church was entrusted to the Greek Catholic Basilian order. The monastery houses the Central State Historical Archive. Between 2004 and 2010, an unsuccessful restoration of the paintings was undertaken. Since 2021, the National Institute of Polish Cultural Heritage Abroad ‘Polonika’ has been co-financing comprehensive restoration work within the church and monastery complex. As a result, among other things, the well of John of Dukla has been restored. In 2024, emergency works were carried out in the monastery buildings to save the archival materials stored there.

=== 21st century ===
On 24 March 2026 the bell tower of the church was damaged by Russian drones.

== Bibliography ==
- Betlej, Andrzej (2012). "Kościół p.w. Św. Andrzeja i klasztor OO. Bernardynów" [Church of St. Andrew and the Bernardine Fathers Monastery]. In Ostrowski, Jan K. (ed.). Kościoły i klasztory Lwowa z okresu przedrozbiorowego [Churches and monasteries of Lviv from the pre-partition period]. Vol. 2. Kraków.
