= Pernus coat of arms =

Pernus

Pernus (Spir, Russian: Спир, German: Kippenhan) Silesian coat of arms from the 13th century by Frederick II, Holy Roman Emperor, from ca. 1442 in Poland. In 1589 Paweł (Paul) Pernus, vogt of the Royal Court received indygenat (grant), of the Kingdom of Poland and the Grand Duchy of Lithuania.

== Blazon ==
Azure, three Gules-Or pears with Vert leaves facing upwards on an argent band falling diagonally. Argent rooster head, Or beaked with Gules comb and wattles in the Crest. Azure, argent backed mantling.

The Polish historian Józef Szymański reports after the heralder Zygmunt Wdowiszewski an alternative version, where the pears are Or completely and the leaves Gules-Or.

The tinctures (colors) are: Azure = blue; Gules = red; Sable = black; Or = gold; Argent = silver; Vert = green.
In heraldry all charges (pictures) on a shield are assumed to be facing dexter (right side).

== Notable bearers ==
In chronologic order:

- (Jaxa?) Pernus of Pirna.
- Spyrn of Rozbark.
- Spyra of Rozbark.
- Jerzy Kyppenheyn, Kraków - father of Walerian.
- Waleryan Pyrnus vel Walerian Pernus vel Valerianus Pernusius, Kraków. - Landowner. Son of Cracow alderman Jerzy Kyppenheyn; studied in Cracow (since 1526) and in Paris (1530-1536), where obtained master's degree in Liberal Arts; in 1536-1540 lecturer at Cracow University. Owner of Pernus Palais in Kraków.
- Seweryn Pernus, Kraków. - Merchant (kupiec AP Kraków, rkps 2559, s. 37; rkps 2574, s. 48; rkps 26, s. 582, 751; rkps 454, s. 395, 519; rkps 455, s. 271-273; wiert, nr 600, 607).
- Paweł Pernus, Kraków. - Wójt (Voigt) of Kraków. Indygenat (grant) in 1589 (Paweł Pernus wójt krak. Nobilitowany w 1589 r. AP Kraków, rkps 2559, s. 4; rkps 23, s. 673; rkps 26, s. 44, 569; rkps 27, s. 161; wiert, nr 526, 534; Chmiel 1924, s. 18; J. Bieniarzówna, Pernus Paweł, PSB, t. 25, s. 635-636; Trelińska, nr 495; Noga, s. 233.).
- Daniel Pernus vel Dan Pernusius, Kraków. - Married 1641 with Marianna Moczarska.
- Mikołaj Pernus, Kraków. - Married 1641 with Barbara Petrycówna.
- Elżbieta Pernus(ówna), Kraków. - Married in 1653 to Albert Konecki.
- Jadwiga Pernus(ówna), Kraków. - Married in 1655 to Jakub (Jacob) Reynekier, Doctor of Medicine and Philosophy.
- Paweł Pernus vel Paulus Pernusius, Kraków. - Studied in Heidelberg (1663-1668).
- Jan Pernus, Kraków. - Councilor of Kraków (around 1669-1677).
