= Słupia, Jędrzejów County =

Słupia
- Village
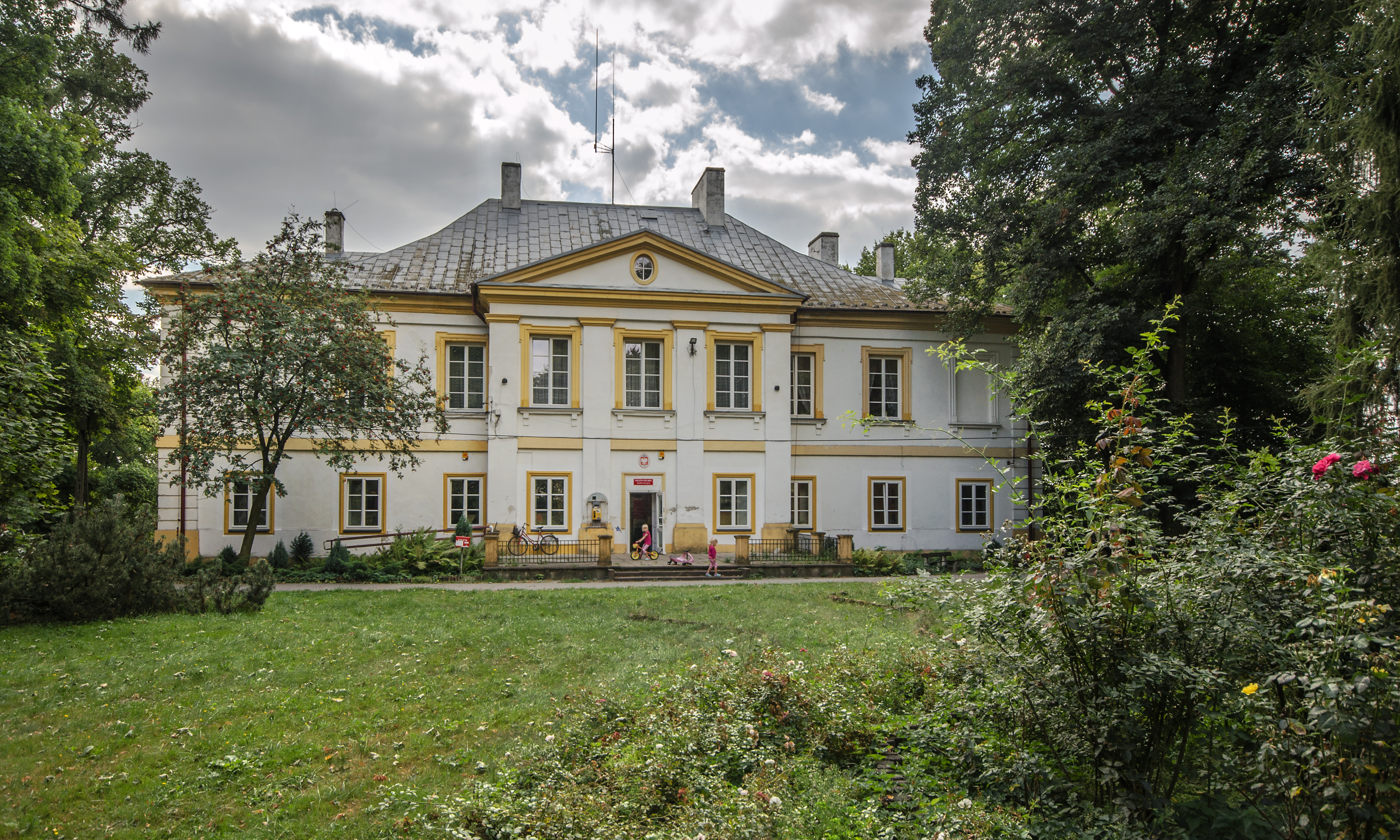
- Palace

- Coat of arms

- Location within Poland
- Coordinates: 50°36′3″N 19°58′28″E
- Country: Poland
- Voivodeship: Świętokrzyskie
- County: Jędrzejów
- Gmina: Słupia
- Population (approx.): 950

Słupia [ˈswupja] is a village in Jędrzejów County, Świętokrzyskie Voivodeship, in south-central Poland. It is the seat of the gmina (administrative district) called Gmina Słupia. It lies approximately 24 km (15 mi) west of Jędrzejów and 56 km (35 mi) south-west of the regional capital Kielce.
