= Bogdal =

Bogdal may refer to:

- Bógdał, a village in Poland
- Klaus-Michael Bogdal (born 1948), German linguist
