= Wespazjan Kochowski =

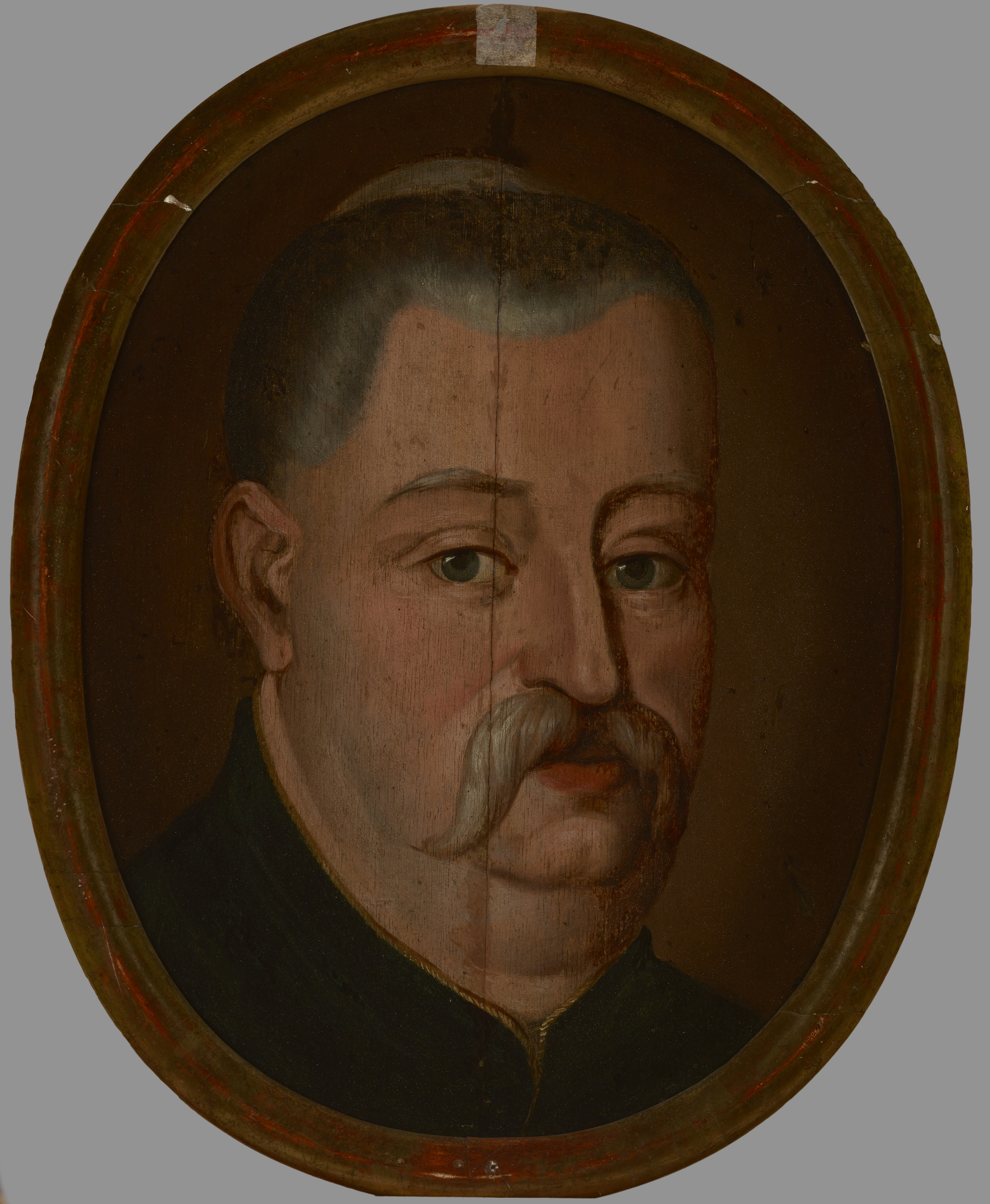
Wespazjan Kochowski, coffin portrait (c. 1787), National Museum in Kraków

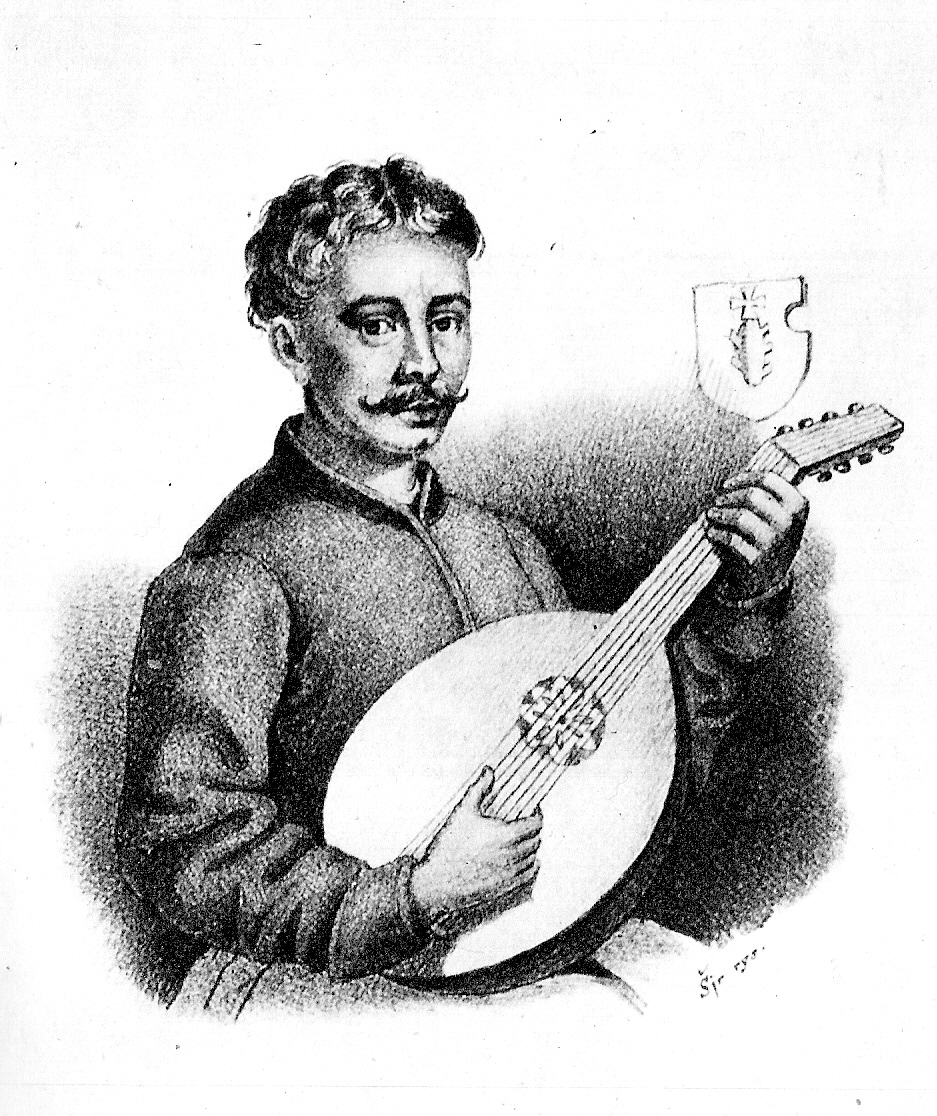
Wespazjan Kochowski

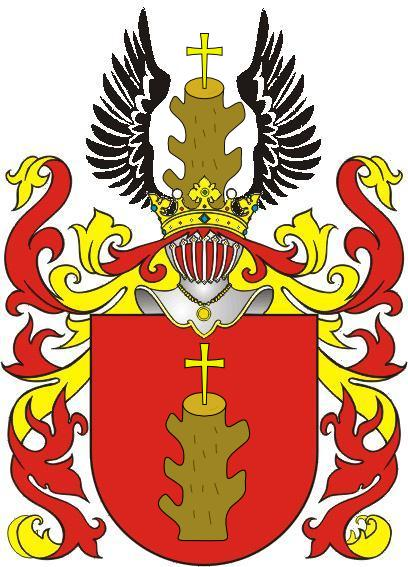
Nieczuja – the coat of arms of Kochowski family

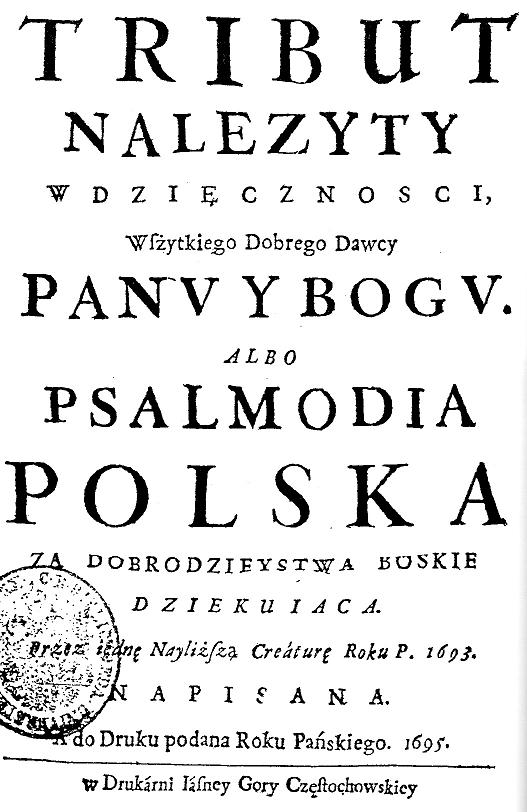
The first page of Psalmodia polska

Wespazjan (Vespasian) Kochowski (1633 – 6 June 1700) a historian and poet of the Polish Baroque, the most typical representative of the philosophy and literature of Sarmatism.

== Life ==
Kochowski was born in 1633 in Gaj, a village which no longer exists, near Waśniów. He was associated with Lesser Poland throughout his life. His parents were Jan (John), a middle rank nobleman (szlachcic), and Zofia (Sophie), née Janowski. He studied at the Nowodworski College, in Kraków. During the next ten years, he fought as a Polish winged hussar with Cossacks, Muscovy and Swedish (he took part, among others, in the battle of Beresteczko). In 1660 he came back to paternal Gaj, but he had to move to Goleniowy near Szczekociny in Kraków Land.

His first publication was a poem entitled Kamień świadectwa wielkiego w Koronie Polskiej senatora niewinności (The Stone of Testimony of the Innocence of the Great Senator of Polish Kingdom) in the defence of Jerzy Sebastian Lubomirski. In 1668 he published his first volume, Różaniec Najświętszej Panny Maryi (The Rosary of Holy Virgin Mary), which considers each secrets of rosary.

During that time, Kochowski was involved in political life (regional councils, state parliaments, local offices), gaining large respect among the nobility. He was even the podżupnik (administrator) of huge salt mines in Wieliczka near Kraków.

In 1674 he published his first masterpiece — Niepróżnujące próżnowanie (Not idling idleness). This is a collection of several hundreds verses, divided in four books of lyrics, one book of epodes and two books of epigrams. He showed the variety of topics, feelings, stylistic figures and versification forms. He expressed the care of Polish–Lithuanian Commonwealth, praised its triumphs, criticised its weaknesses, encouraged compatriots to defence it; he glorified life in the country and his paternal region, thanked God for looking for him and also joked at many ordinary situations in life.

In 1681 Kochowski also wrote two religious poems: Chrystus cierpiący (Suffering Christ), which laments the Passion of Our Lord, and Ogród panieński (Virgin's Garden), which explains the titles of Our Lady.

During the reign of John III Sobieski he turned towards history. In 1683 he wrote Annales Poloniae ab obitu Vladislai IV (The Annals of Poland from the Death of Ladislas IV), commonly called Klimaktery ("Climacters"). This is the history of the Polish–Lithuanian Commonwealth under kings John II Casimir and Michał Korybut Wiśniowiecki. Kochowski had used the information from many witnesses, documents and his own experiences and he had done it so well. This book is one of the main sources for the old Polish history.

In 1683 Kochowski took part in the battle of Vienna as historiographus privilegiatus (the privileged historian); a position granted to him by king Jan III Sobieski, an admirer of his historian skills. Next year he published the official relation from that – Commentarius belli adversus Turcas (Memoirs from the war against Turks). He also tried to make the national epos, but he managed to write only one canto, edited as Dzieło Boskie albo Pieśni Wiednia wybawionego (The Work of God or Songs of Liberated Vienna, also in 1684.

The last, most original and interesting piece of Kochowski was Trybut należyty wdzięczności wszystkiego dobrego Dawcy, Panu i Bogu albo Psalmodia polska za dobrodziejstwa Boskie dziękująca (The Appropriate Gift of Gratefulness for the Giver of Everything Good, Lord and God, or Polish Psalmody, Thanking for the God's Benefits) from 1695, usually called simply Psalmodia polska (The Polish Psalmody). It distinguishes itself, on one hand, by the Bible stylization, and on the other hand, by the change of point of view from Hebrew to Pole, from Jew to Christian, from ancient person to modern one. There are mixed 14 private and 22 public psalms. It tells about the expiation and the God's mercy, moderation of greeds and believing in the providence (złota mierność – the golden mean), special role of Poland in the world (antemurale christianitatis – the bulwark of Christianity) and the superiority of Polish political system (złota wolność – the golden liberty). Psalmodia polska is recognized as one of the main monuments of old Polish literature and the best synthesis of Sarmatism.

In 1658 Kochowski married Marianna (Marianne) Misiowska. They had a son, Hieronim Franciszek (Jerome Francis), as late as 1674. After the death of Marianna in 1677 he married rich widow Magdalena (Madeline) Frezer. In 1696 she also died. Wespazjan Kochowski died in Kraków on 6 June 1700.

He was the best friend of Jan Gawiński, who was also a good poet.

== Works ==
- Wespazjan Kochowski, Utwory poetyckie. Wybór, opr. Maria Eustachiewicz, Wrocław–Warsaw–Kraków, 1991 (Biblioteka Narodowa, seria I, number 92)
- Wespazjan Kochowski, Lata potopu: 1655-1657, tł. Leszek Kukulski, opr. Julian Krzyżanowski, Adam Kersten, Warsaw, 1966
- Wespazjan Kochowski, Psalmodia polska, Kraków, 2003
- Wespazjan Kochowski, Wybór wierszy, Kraków, 2003
- Wespazjan Kochowski, Poezje wybrane, opr. Halina Kaszprzakówna] Jerzy Starnawski, Warsaw, 1977
- Wespazjan Kochowski, Niepróżnujące próżnowanie ojczystym rymem na liryka i epigramata polskie rozdzielone i wydane, opr. Wacław Walecki, Warszaw, 1978
- Wespazjan Kochowski, Dzieło Boskie albo Pieśni Wiednia wybawionego, opr. Marian Kaczmarek, Wrocław, 1983
- Wespazjan Kochowski, Pisma wierszem i prozą, wyd. Kazimierz Józef Turowski, Kraków, 1859 (jedyne pełne wydanie jego polskich poezji)

== See also ==
- Andrzej Maksymilian Fredro
- Jan Chryzostom Pasek
- Wacław Potocki
- Maciej Kazimierz Sarbiewski
- Samuel Twardowski
