= Starzyny =

Starzyny may refer to the following places:

- Starzyny, Greater Poland Voivodeship (west-central Poland)
- Starzyny, Łódź Voivodeship (central Poland)
- Starzyny, Silesian Voivodeship (south Poland)
