= Rokitno, Silesian Voivodeship =

Rokitno
- Village
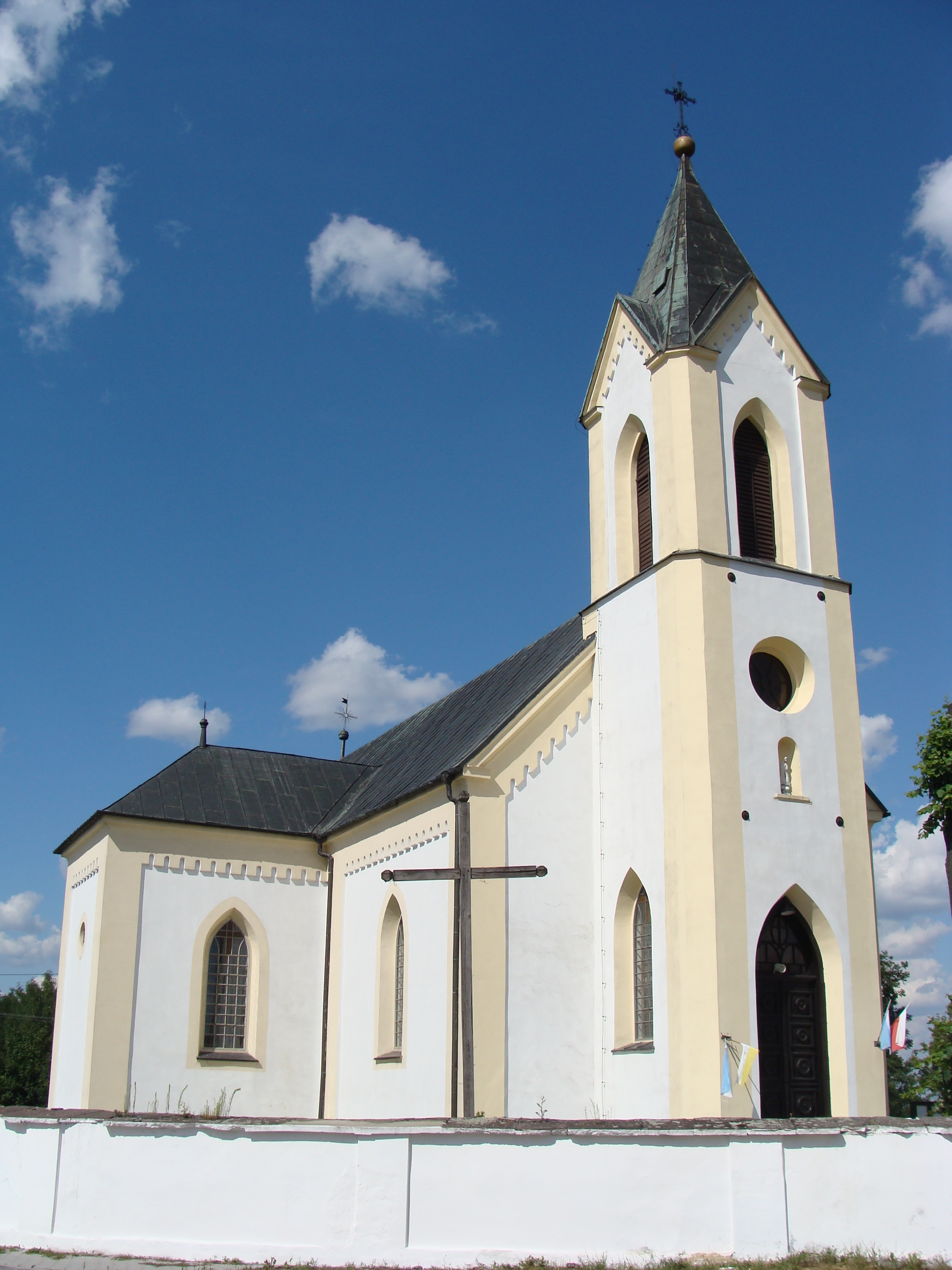
- Saint Mary Magdalene Church

- Location within Poland
- Coordinates: 50°35′1″N 19°46′54″E
- Country: Poland
- Voivodeship: Silesian
- County: Zawiercie
- Gmina: Szczekociny

Rokitno [rɔˈkitnɔ] is a village in the administrative district of Gmina Szczekociny, within Zawiercie County, Silesian Voivodeship, in southern Poland.
