= Bonowice =

- Village
- Location within Poland
- Coordinates: 50°37′26″N 19°46′55″E
- Country: Poland
- Voivodeship: Silesian
- County: Zawiercie
- Gmina: Szczekociny

Bonowice [bɔnɔˈvit͡sɛ] is a village in the administrative district of Gmina Szczekociny, within Zawiercie County, Silesian Voivodeship, in southern Poland.
