= Gustawów, Silesian Voivodeship =

Gustawów
- Village
- Location within Poland
- Coordinates: 50°38′46″N 19°45′59″E
- Country: Poland
- Voivodeship: Silesian
- County: Zawiercie
- Gmina: Szczekociny

Gustawów [ɡusˈtavuf] is a village in the administrative district of Gmina Szczekociny, within Zawiercie County, Silesian Voivodeship, in southern Poland.
