= Szyszki, Silesian Voivodeship =

Szyszki
- Village
- Location within Poland
- Coordinates: 50°41′2″N 19°45′46″E
- Country: Poland
- Voivodeship: Silesian
- County: Zawiercie
- Gmina: Szczekociny

Szyszki (Polish pronunciation: [ˈʂɨʂkʲi]) is a village in the administrative district of Gmina Szczekociny, within Zawiercie County, Silesian Voivodeship, in southern Poland.
