= Rędziny, Zawiercie County =

Rędziny
- Village
- Location within Poland
- Coordinates: 50°41′7″N 19°51′53″E
- Country: Poland
- Voivodeship: Silesian
- County: Zawiercie
- Gmina: Szczekociny
- Population: 50

Rędziny [rɛnˈd͡ʑinɨ] is a village in the administrative district of Gmina Szczekociny, within Zawiercie County, Silesian Voivodeship, in southern Poland.
