= Grabiec =

- Village
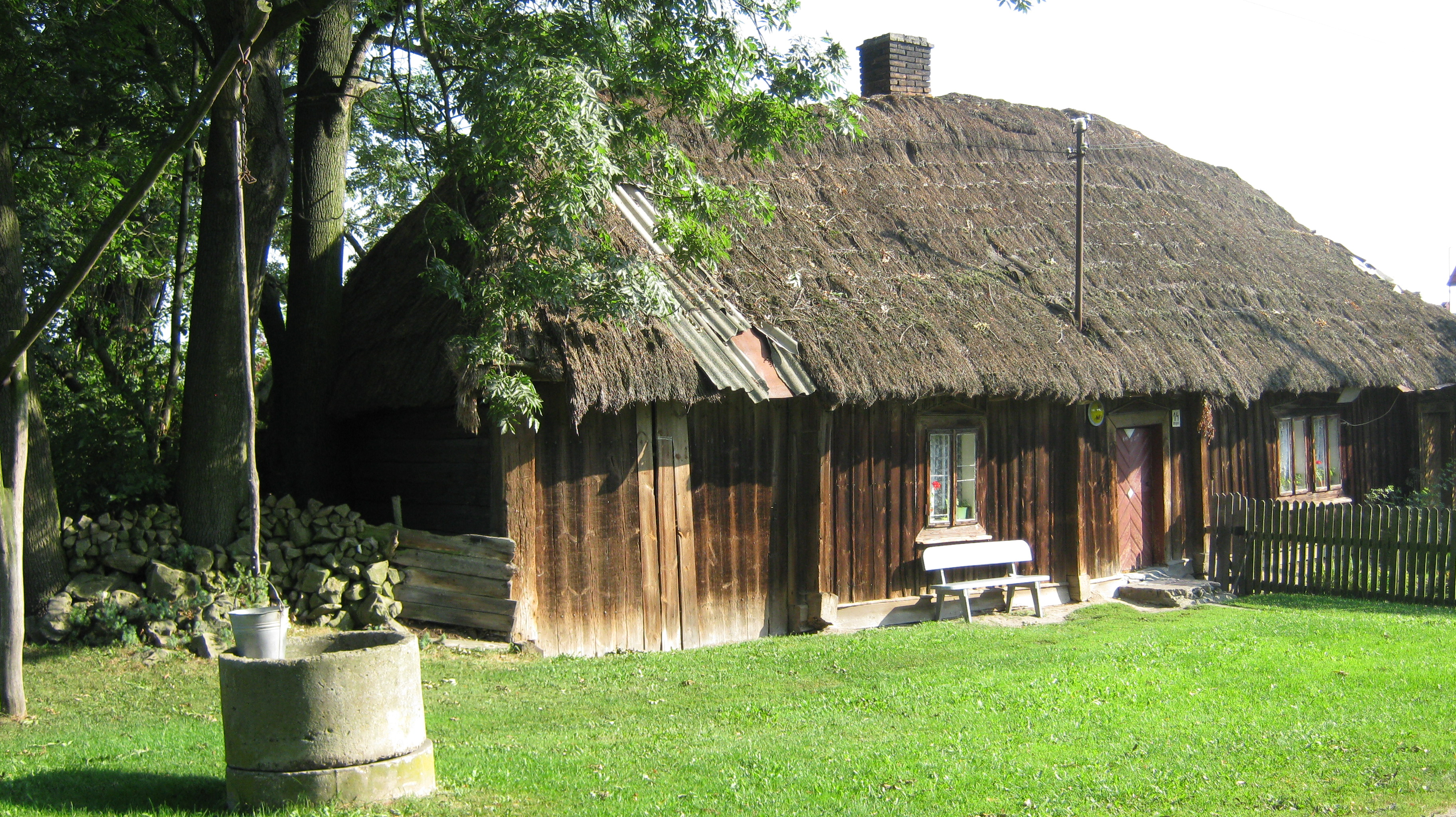

- Location within Poland
- Coordinates: 50°37′0″N 19°45′8″E
- Country: Poland
- Voivodeship: Silesian
- County: Zawiercie
- Gmina: Szczekociny

Grabiec [ˈɡrabjɛt͡s] is a village in the administrative district of Gmina Szczekociny, within Zawiercie County, Silesian Voivodeship, in southern Poland.
