= Wólka Ołudzka =

- Village
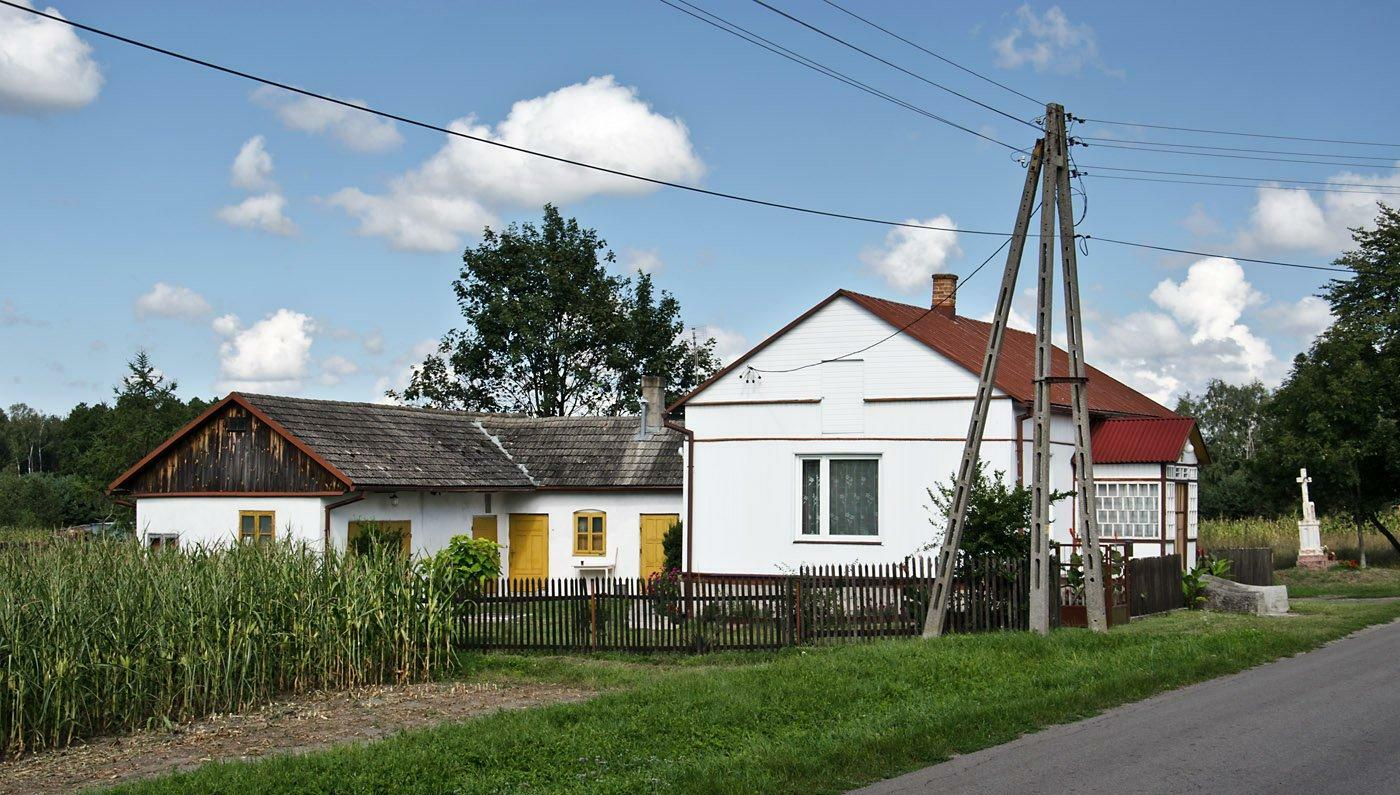

- Location within Poland
- Coordinates: 50°33′51″N 19°46′35″E
- Country: Poland
- Voivodeship: Silesian
- County: Zawiercie
- Gmina: Szczekociny

Wólka Ołudzka [ˈvulka ɔˈwut͡ska] is a village in the administrative district of Gmina Szczekociny, within Zawiercie County, Silesian Voivodeship, in southern Poland.
