= Goleniowy =

- Village
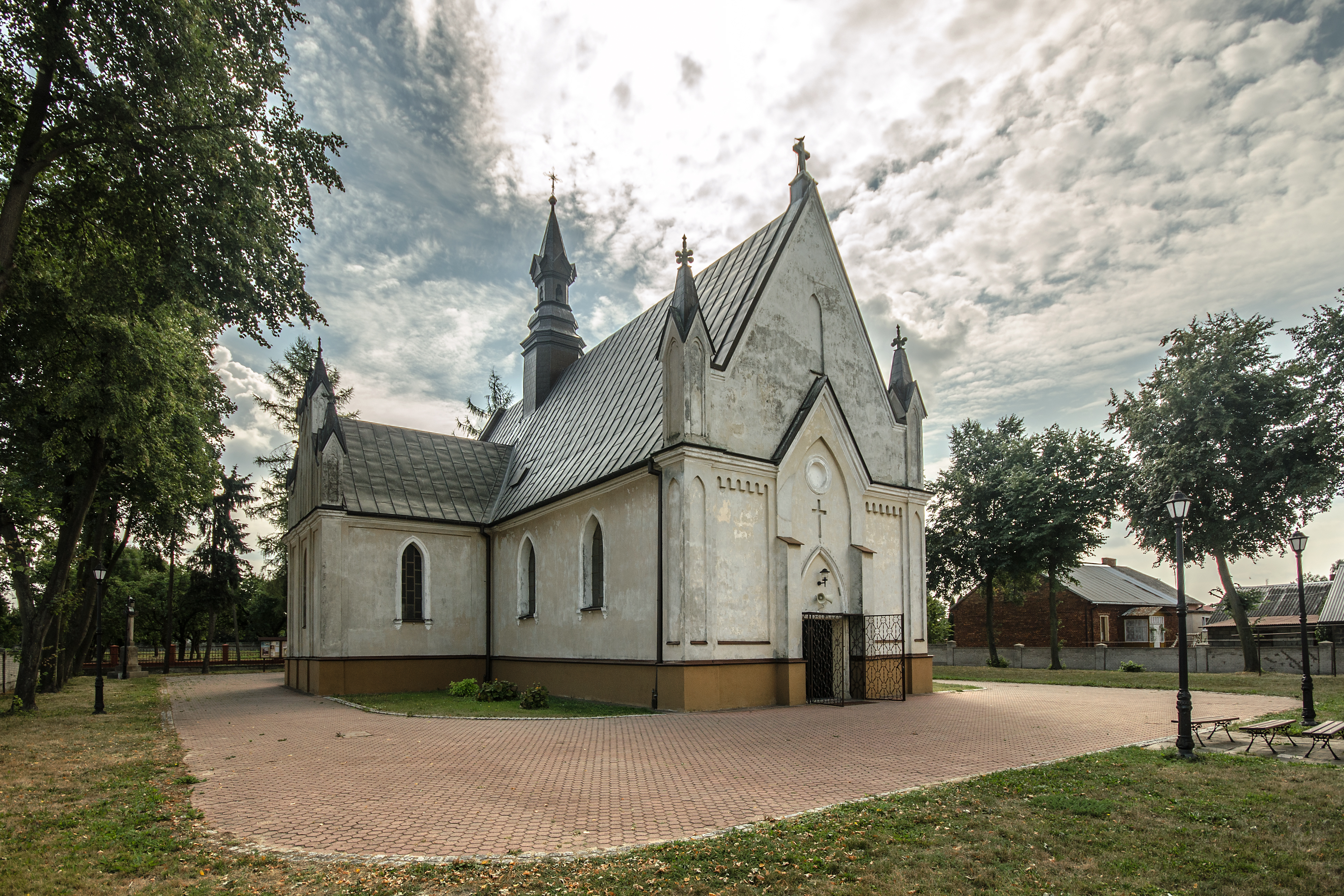
- Catholic school

- Location within Poland
- Coordinates: 50°37′57″N 19°52′27″E
- Country: Poland
- Voivodeship: Silesian
- County: Zawiercie
- Gmina: Szczekociny
- Elevation: 310 m (1,020 ft)
- Population (approx.): 2,000

Goleniowy [ɡɔlɛˈɲɔvɨ] is a village in the administrative district of Gmina Szczekociny, within Zawiercie County, Silesian Voivodeship, in southern Poland.

The Polish poet Wespazjan Kochowski (1660-1700) lived in Golenowy.
