= Wólka Starzyńska =

- Village
- Location within Poland
- Coordinates: 50°41′53″N 19°47′54″E
- Country: Poland
- Voivodeship: Silesian
- County: Zawiercie
- Gmina: Szczekociny

Wólka Starzyńska [ˈvulka staˈʐɨɲska] is a village in the administrative district of Gmina Szczekociny, within Zawiercie County, Silesian Voivodeship, in southern Poland.
