= Szczekociny rail crash =

2012 railroad accident in Poland

- Video of the site after the incident

Details
- Date: 3 March 2012; 20:55 CET
- Location: Chałupki near Szczekociny
- Coordinates: 50°37′14″N 19°51′30″E
- Country: Poland
- Line: Kozłów – Koniecpol, section Sprowa – Starzyny
- Operator: PKP Intercity (TLK), Przewozy Regionalne (iR)
- Incident type: Head-on collision
- Cause: Train dispatcher error

Statistics
- Trains: TLK 31101 Brzechwa Przemyśl Główny – Warszawa Wschodnia; iR 13126 Jan Matejko Warszawa Wschodnia – Kraków Główny
- Passengers: ~350
- Deaths: 16
- Injured: 61
Route map
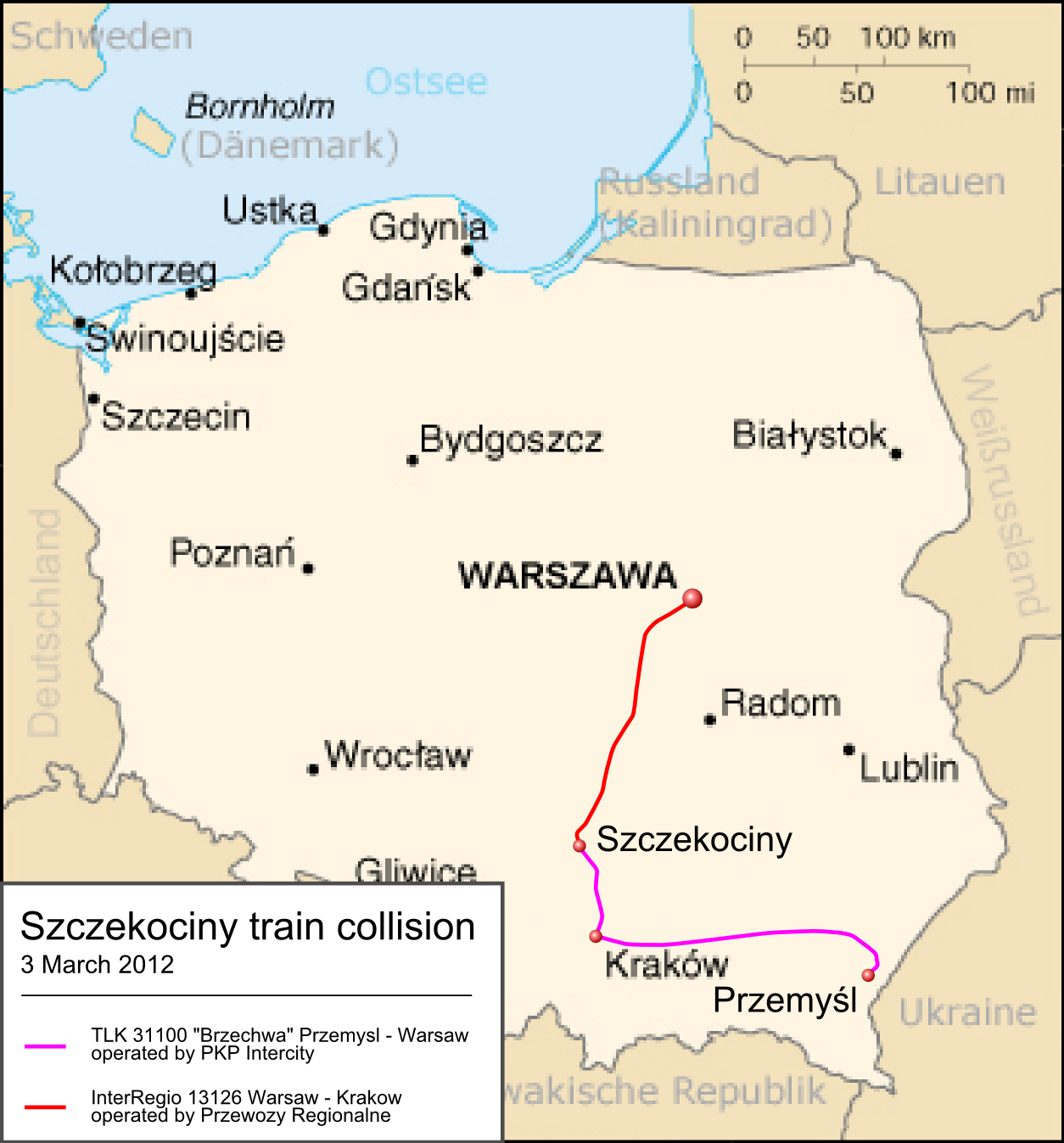

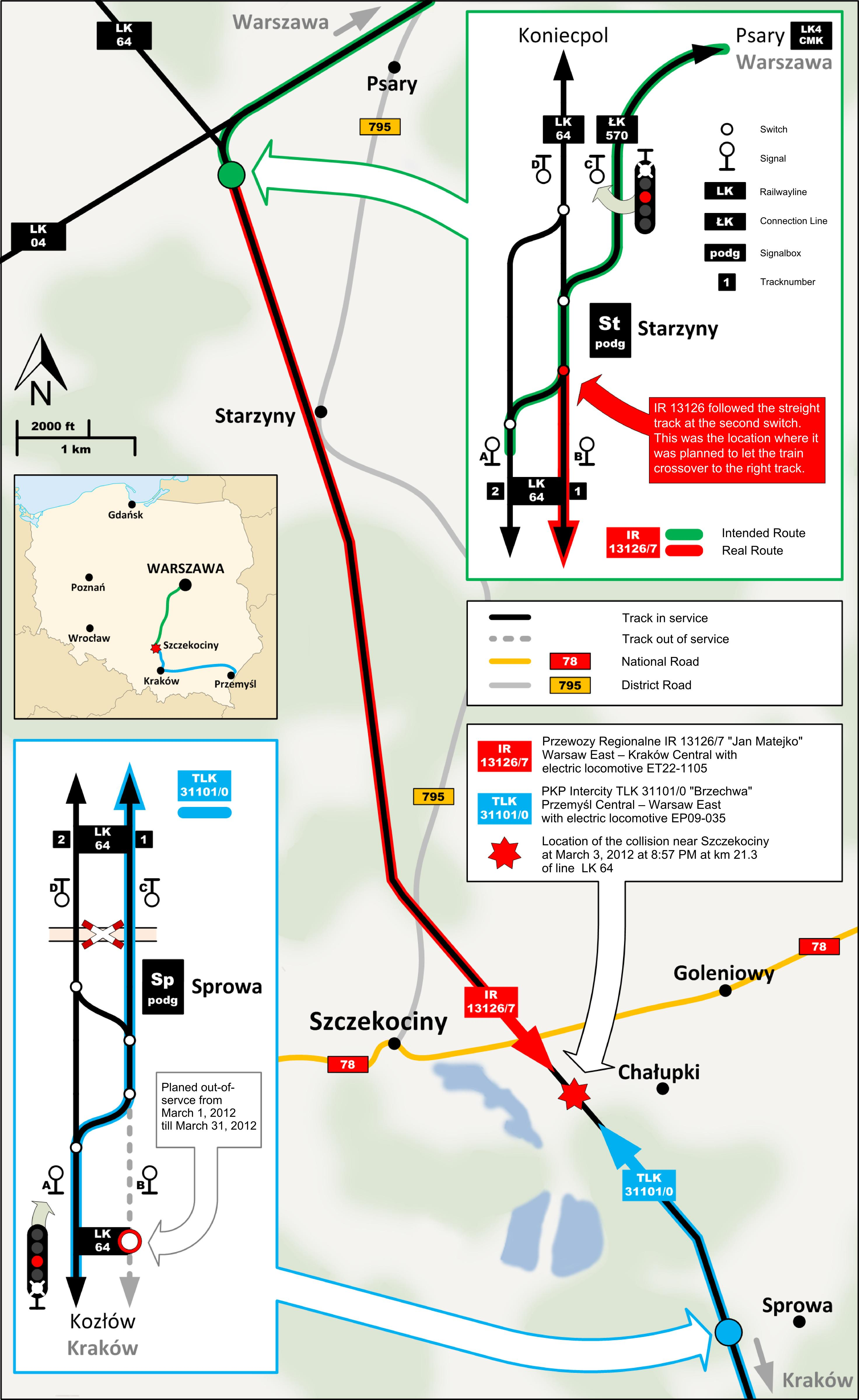
Infographic of the crash

The Szczekociny rail crash occurred on 3 March 2012 when two passenger trains collided head-on near the town of Szczekociny, Silesian Voivodeship, Poland. Sixteen people died in the incident and 58 were injured. An investigative report showed that the cause of the crash was due to human error by train dispatchers and the train drivers.

== Incident ==
At around 20:55 CET on 3 March 2012, two passenger trains (totalling approximately 350 passengers in 10 carriages) collided at Chałupki near the Silesian Voivodship town of Szczekociny. One train, the TLK 31101 Brzechwa operated by PKP Intercity, was travelling north from Przemyśl to Warsaw; the other was the InterRegio 13126 Matejko operated by Przewozy Regionalne, travelling south from Warsaw to Kraków at 95 kilometres per hour (59 mph). At the time, scheduled engineering works were underway on the track at Szczekociny railway station. A spokesman from Polish State Railways said that as a result of this, the Kraków-bound train was "on the wrong track". The InterRegio train was hauled by Class ET22 locomotive 1105, and the Intercity by Class EP09-035.

Because of the collision, one carriage of the northbound Warsaw train telescoped, and other carriages derailed. One eyewitness described carriages colliding like a concertina.

One third of the EP09-035 engine room, along with both cabins, was completely destroyed. Locomotive ET22-1105's front cabin was destroyed and rotated 180° as a result of the collision.

== Casualties ==
Officials announced that the incident resulted in 16 fatalities and 61 injuries. There were two foreigners among fatalities: an American woman, and a Russian national. On 6 March 2012, Polish newspaper Gazeta Wyborcza reported that the drivers of both trains and a number of train staff died in the incident.

Six Ukrainians, one Moldovan and one Czech were among the injured. Szymon Nowak, a doctor in a nearby hospital, stated that a number of the casualties were in a serious condition; some were in medically induced comas. The casualties were reported as having a variety of injuries including broken arms and legs, pelvic and spinal fractures, as well as facial and internal injuries. One 29-year-old female had a leg amputated.

The rescue operation involved approximately 450 firemen and 120 police officers. 35 ambulances and 2 air ambulances took casualties to a number of hospitals, including those in Piekary Śląskie, Myszków, Częstochowa, Zawiercie, Katowice, Sosnowiec, Dąbrowa Górnicza and Bytom.

As of 8 March 2012, 39 people remained in hospital. Of these, 4 remained in intensive care.

Among fatal casualties was Maja Brand.

== Investigation ==
On 4 March 2012, Polish prosecutors opened an investigation into the incident. The following day, the Associated Press reported that one prosecutor, Tomasz Ozimek, was seeking to press charges against a railroad traffic controller. Ozimek alleged that the controller's error resulted in one of the trains moving onto the wrong track. It was announced at a press conference in Częstochowa that two people were detained, without charge, including the controller, who was in psychiatric care due to suffering from shock. The second person, a female dispatcher, was released on 6 March without charge.

By 8 March, the line reopened after reconstruction work. Polskie Radio reported that PKP acknowledged prior knowledge of faulty points on the line. TVN, one of the Polish TV networks, reported that the points and signals on the line had been faulty 65 times between 30 November 2011 (the day the line was put back in use after modernization) and the day of the crash.

The investigation revealed that a series of mistakes caused the collision:

- The day before the crash, the dispatcher in Starzyny sent another train on the wrong track. The investigation team (PKBWK) should have been notified and the dispatcher relieved of his duties, but the national rail infrastructure manager, PKP PLK, did neither of these;
- On the day of the crash, a switch in Starzyny had malfunctioned and the train dispatcher (the same who sent the train on the wrong track the day before) had used a subsidiary signal, sending the southbound train (IR 13126 Matejko) on a wrong track;
- The train dispatcher in Starzyny did not visually confirm where the train was and erroneously informed the dispatcher in Sprowa that the train was on the correct track;
- The interREGIO driver did not stop the train after entering the wrong track, as he should have since the subsidiary signal did not have an additional W24 sign underneath it;
- As interREGIO entered the wrong track, the signalling in Sprowa informed the train dispatcher that the track was occupied, but because of the Starzyny dispatcher giving her wrong information, she presumed that the signalling had malfunctioned and used subsidiary signal as well, sending northbound TLK 31100 Brzechwa on the correct, but occupied, track;
- The dispatcher in Sprowa mistakenly included the W24 sign with the subsidiary signal, suggesting that the TLK train would continue on the left track. Paradoxically, this mistake could have averted the crash; however, the TLK driver did not react to the discrepancy.

The official report was issued on 15 February 2013.

== Reactions ==
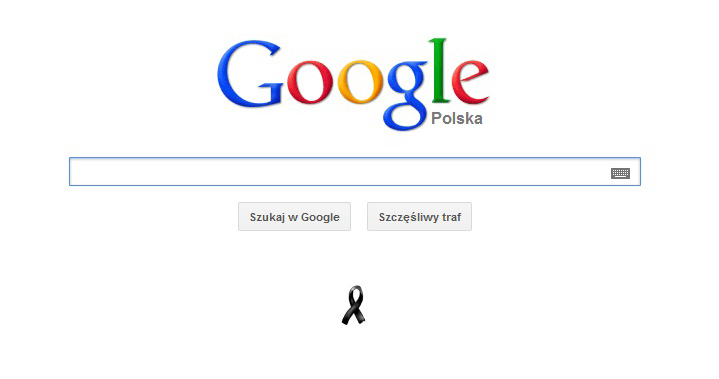
Polish Google Search page, displaying a black ribbon after the rail crash.

Then-president of Poland Bronislaw Komorowski declared two days of mourning beginning on Monday 5 March. Polish Prime Minister Donald Tusk said that the incident was "[Poland's] most tragic train disaster in many, many years", referring to the 1990 Ursus accident, and that it was too soon to speculate about what caused the Szczekociny collision. Tusk added that human error could not be excluded from the lines of enquiry.

Slawomir Nowak, the Minister of Transport, insisted that Polish rail travel was safe and that safety was a priority. He added that people planning to travel on the Polish railway system during Euro 2012 need not worry, stating that he believed that "the train system – not only in Poland but all of Europe – is still very safe".

Pope Benedict XVI wrote to Archbishop Józef Michalik expressing condolences, stating that it was "with pain [he received] the news of the train crash". He gave all casualties of the incident his "apostolic blessing" and said that he was praying for the victims and their families.

Prime Minister of the United Kingdom David Cameron wrote to Tusk, expressing his "heartfelt sympathy and support", stating that he was "shocked and saddened" by the incident. German Chancellor Angela Merkel and Foreign Minister Guido Westerwelle also sent Tusk and the victims' families their condolences. President of Slovakia Ivan Gašparovič – along with Prime Minister Iveta Radičová and Foreign Minister Mikuláš Dzurinda – gave their sympathy to the families and relatives of the incident's victims. Prime Minister of the Czech Republic Petr Nečas wrote to "express [his] grief over every human life that has perished in the disaster". Andrius Kubilius, the Prime Minister of Lithuania, wished Poland "the strength required in those moments of grief and mourning". Prime Minister of Hungary Viktor Orbán wrote to Tusk to reassure him that the "Hungarian people are joining [their] Polish friends in mourning". Boyko Borisov, the Prime Minister of Bulgaria, sent his "most sincere condolences to the families and relatives of the victims", stating that the Bulgarian people "join [them] in pain". The Prime Minister of Singapore Lee Hsien Loong wrote a letter to Tusk, expressing his "deepest condolences to the people of Poland".

== See also ==
- List of rail accidents (2010–2019)
- List of Poland disasters by death toll
- Tempi train crash
