= Brzostek, Silesian Voivodeship =

Brzostek
- Village
- Location within Poland
- Coordinates: 50°42′49″N 19°46′24″E
- Country: Poland
- Voivodeship: Silesian
- County: Zawiercie
- Gmina: Szczekociny

Brzostek [ˈbʐɔstɛk] is a village in the administrative district of Gmina Szczekociny, within Zawiercie County, Silesian Voivodeship, in southern Poland.
