= Jan Gawiński =

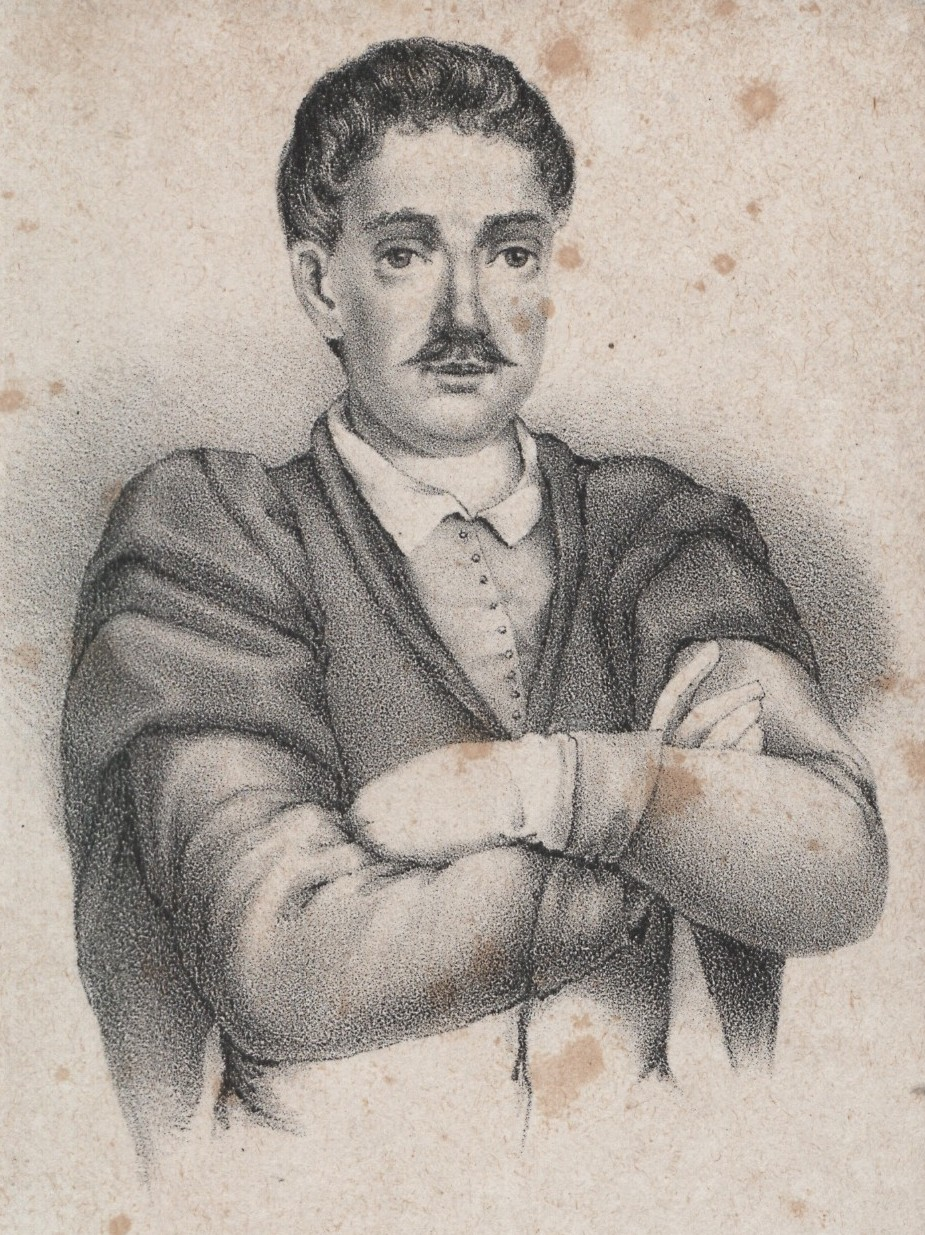
Jan Gawiński

Jan z Wielomowic Gawiński (c. 1622 – c. 1684) was a Polish Baroque poet.

Gawiński is counted into the classical generation of Sarmatians - the generation of John III Sobieski, though his nobility is not certain. He likely descended from the town of Wilamowice near Kraków. He studied at the Biała Podlaska branch of Jagiellonian University. Next he was a courtier of bishop Charles Ferdinand Vasa. He may have fought with the Cossacks. Finally he settled down in Krakow and married Małgorzata Lajtner. There he held several offices, including the steward of saltworks in Wieliczka and Bochnia. He was also the best friend of Wespazjan Kochowski; they found second wives for each other.

His most famous works are his idylls, taking pattern from Anacreon, Szymon Szymonowic and ancient Latin poets, glorifying life in the village and published many times. He wrote Dworzanki albo Epigrammata polskie (Court ladies or Polish epigrams), a series of epigrams Nagrobki (Epitaphs), a Latin poem on the death of Krzysztof Wilski Planctus (Crying) and translations of the works of Maciej Kazimierz Sarbiewski. He also wrote the poem Clipaeus christianitatis (The shield of Christianity), in praise of John III Sobieski defeating the Ottoman Empire.
