= Drużykowa =

- Village
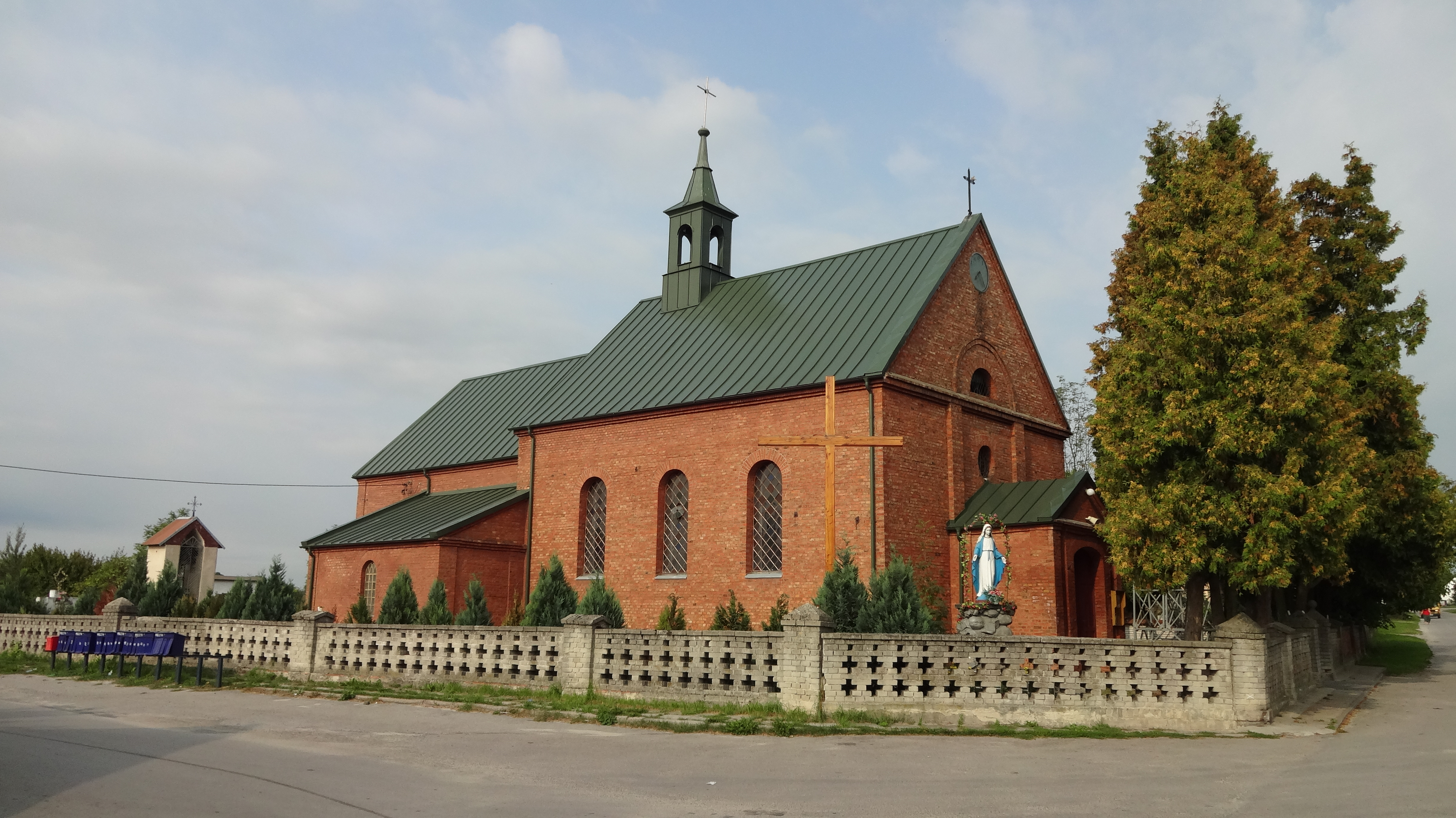
- Local Catholic church

- Location within Poland
- Coordinates: 50°40′55″N 19°50′43″E
- Country: Poland
- Voivodeship: Silesian
- County: Zawiercie
- Gmina: Szczekociny
- Population: 150

Drużykowa [druʐɨˈkɔva] is a village in the administrative district of Gmina Szczekociny, within Zawiercie County, Silesian Voivodeship, in southern Poland.
