= Ołudza =

- Village
- Location within Poland
- Coordinates: 50°33′37″N 19°44′51″E
- Country: Poland
- Voivodeship: Silesian
- County: Zawiercie
- Gmina: Szczekociny

Ołudza [ɔˈwud͡za] is a village in the administrative district of Gmina Szczekociny, within Zawiercie County, Silesian Voivodeship, in southern Poland.
