= Małachów, Silesian Voivodeship =

Małachów
- Village
- Location within Poland
- Coordinates: 50°39′6″N 19°45′46″E
- Country: Poland
- Voivodeship: Silesian
- County: Zawiercie
- Gmina: Szczekociny
- Population: 10

Małachów [maˈwaxuf] is a village in the administrative district of Gmina Szczekociny within Zawiercie County, Silesian Voivodeship in southern Poland.
