= Przyłęk, Silesian Voivodeship =

Przyłęk
- Village
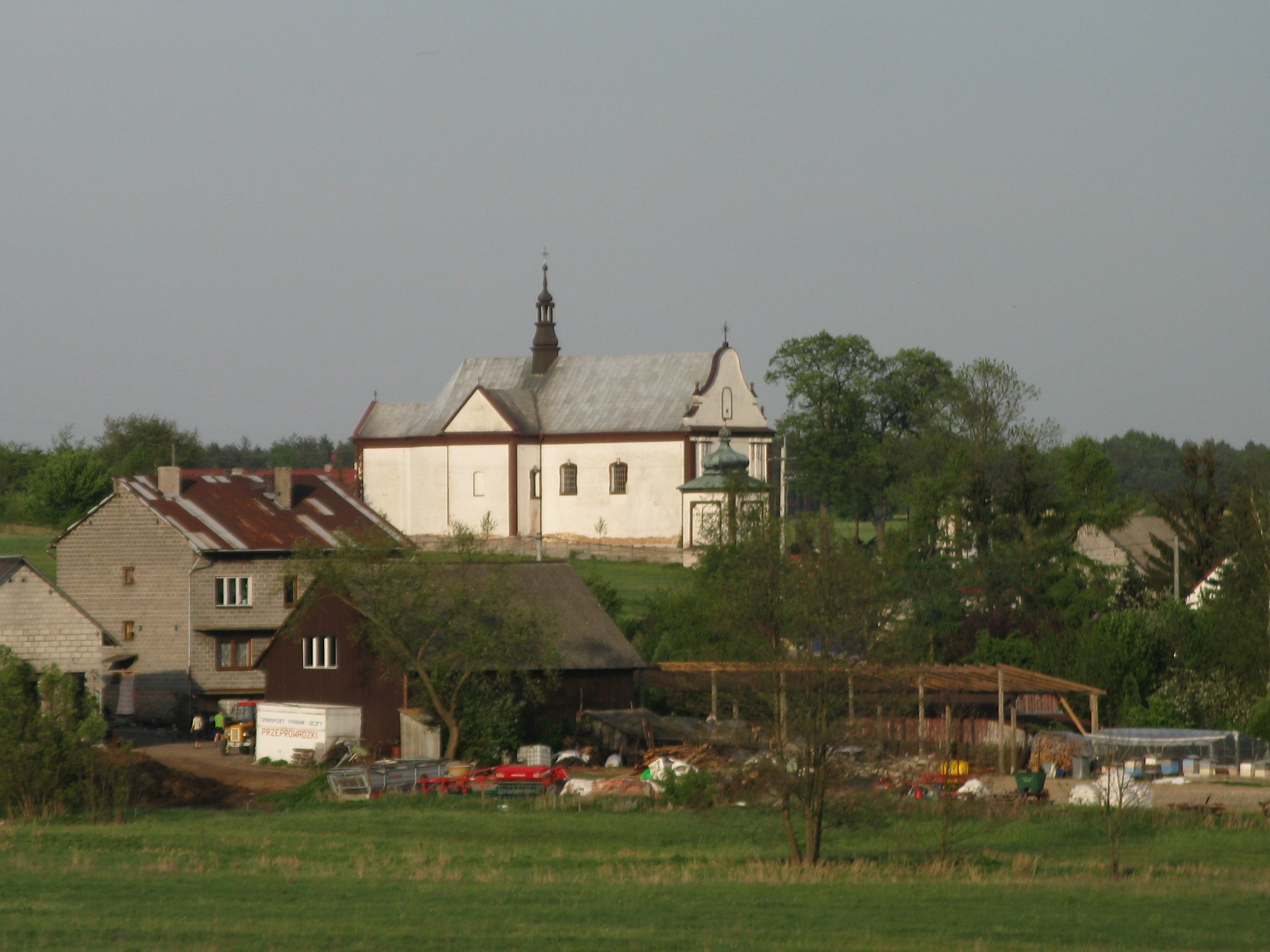

- Location within Poland
- Coordinates: 50°41′48″N 19°45′24″E
- Country: Poland
- Voivodeship: Silesian
- County: Zawiercie
- Gmina: Szczekociny
- Population (approx.): 120

Przyłęk [ˈpʂɨwɛnk] is a village in the administrative district of Gmina Szczekociny, within Zawiercie County, Silesian Voivodeship, in southern Poland.
