= Chałupki, Zawiercie County =

Chałupki
- Village
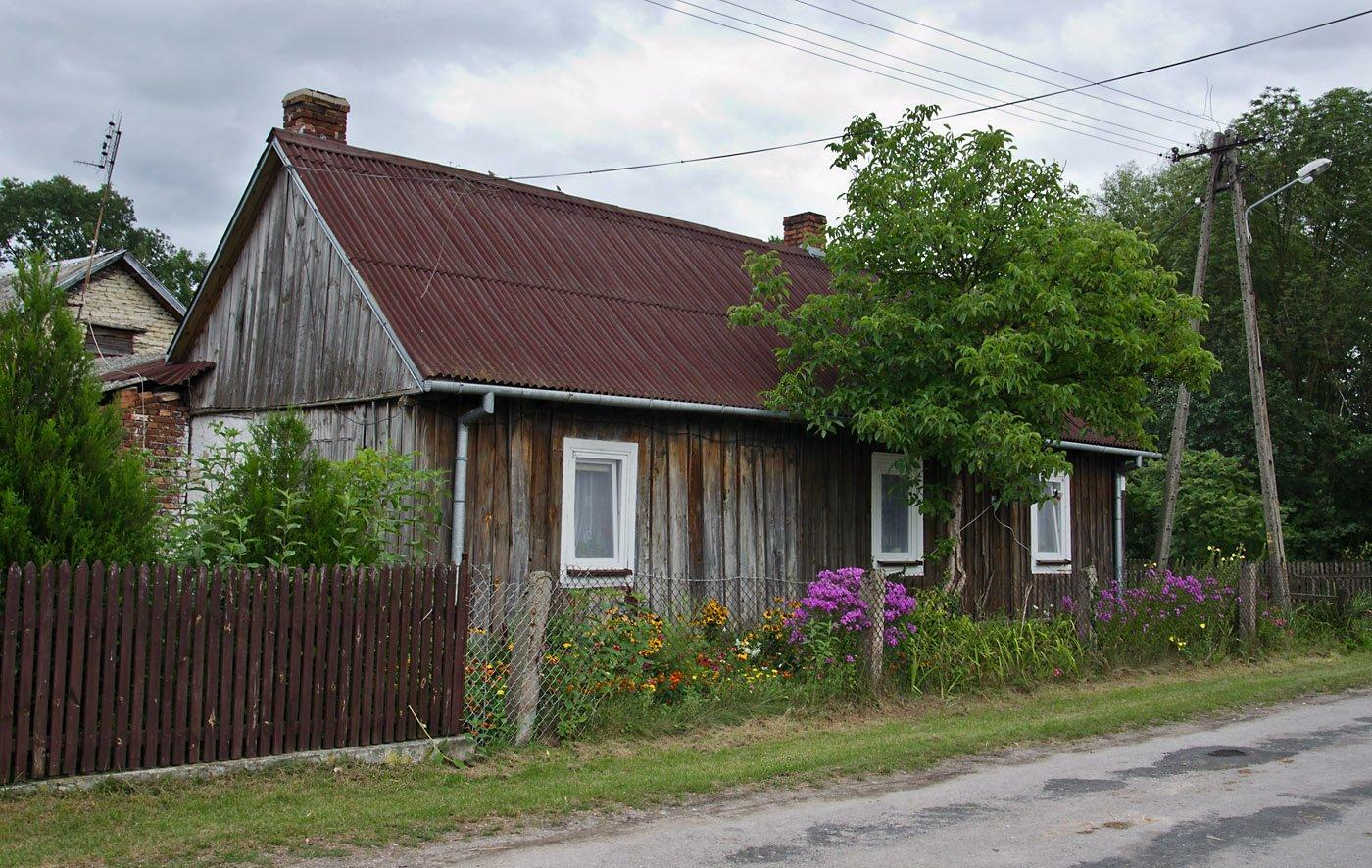
- Wooden house

- Location within Poland
- Coordinates: 50°37′19″N 19°51′53″E
- Country: Poland
- Voivodeship: Silesian
- County: Zawiercie
- Gmina: Szczekociny

Chałupki [xaˈwupki] is a village in the administrative district of Gmina Szczekociny, within Zawiercie County, Silesian Voivodeship, in southern Poland.

== Train crash ==
On March 3, 2012 a train crash took place in Chałupki, when two passenger trains collided head-on. 16 passengers were killed. The incident provoked condolences from the leaders of a number of European countries.
