= Siedliska, Zawiercie County =

Siedliska
- Village
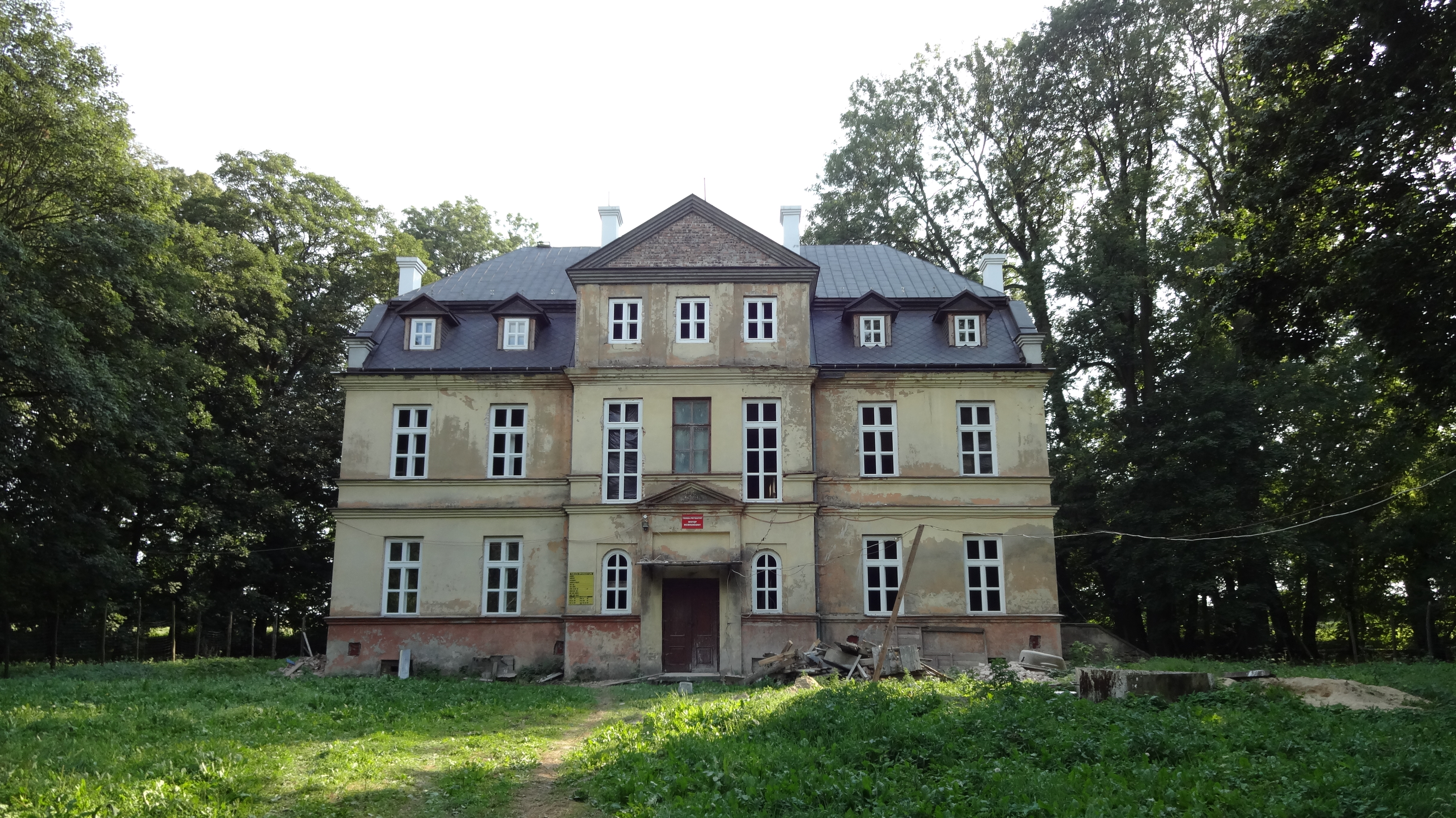
- Palace in Siedliska

- Location within Poland
- Coordinates: 50°38′12″N 19°45′6″E
- Country: Poland
- Voivodeship: Silesian
- County: Zawiercie
- Gmina: Szczekociny

Siedliska [ɕɛdˈlʲiska] is a village in the administrative district of Gmina Szczekociny, within Zawiercie County, Silesian Voivodeship, in southern Poland.
