= Tęgobórz =

- Village
- Location within Poland
- Coordinates: 50°38′41″N 19°47′12″E
- Country: Poland
- Voivodeship: Silesian
- County: Zawiercie
- Gmina: Szczekociny

Tęgobórz [tɛnˈɡɔbuʂ] is a village in the administrative district of Gmina Szczekociny, within Zawiercie County, Silesian Voivodeship, in southern Poland.
