= Gmina Szczekociny =

Gmina Szczekociny Szczekociny Commune
- Gmina
- Coat of arms
- Interactive map of Gmina Szczekociny
- Coordinates (Szczekociny): 50°38′N 19°50′E
- Country: Poland
- Voivodeship: Silesian
- County: Zawiercie
- Seat: Szczekociny

Area
  - Total: 136.09 km^{2} (52.54 sq mi)

Population (2019-06-30)
  - Total: 7,692
  - Density: 56.52/km^{2} (146.4/sq mi)
  - Urban: 3,612
  - Rural: 4,080
- Car plates: SZA
- Website: http://www.szczekociny.pl

Gmina Szczekociny is an urban-rural gmina (administrative district) in Zawiercie County, Silesian Voivodeship, in southern Poland. Its seat is the town of Szczekociny, which lies approximately 33 kilometres (21 mi) north-east of Zawiercie and 73 km (45 mi) north-east of the regional capital Katowice.

The gmina covers an area of 136.09 square kilometres (52.5 sq mi), and as of 2019 its total population is 7,692.

== Villages ==
Apart from the town of Szczekociny, Gmina Szczekociny contains the villages and settlements of Bógdał, Bonowice, Brzostek, Chałupki, Drużykowa, Goleniowy, Grabiec, Gustawów, Małachów, Ołudza, Przyłęk, Rędziny, Rokitno, Siedliska, Starzyny, Szyszki, Tęgobórz, Wólka Ołudzka and Wólka Starzyńska.

== Neighbouring gminas ==
Gmina Szczekociny is bordered by the gminas of Irządze, Koniecpol, Kroczyce, Lelów, Moskorzew, Pilica, Radków, Secemin, Słupia and Żarnowiec.

== Twin towns – sister cities ==
Gmina Szczekociny is twinned with:

- Adony, Hungary
- Jelšava, Slovakia
