= Bógdał =

- Village
- Location within Poland
- Coordinates: 50°39′27″N 19°49′0″E
- Country: Poland
- Voivodeship: Silesian
- County: Zawiercie
- Gmina: Szczekociny
- Population: 320

Bógdał [ˈbuɡdau̯] is a village in the administrative district of Gmina Szczekociny, within Zawiercie County, Silesian Voivodeship, in southern Poland.
