= Klaus-Michael Bogdal =

German literature professor

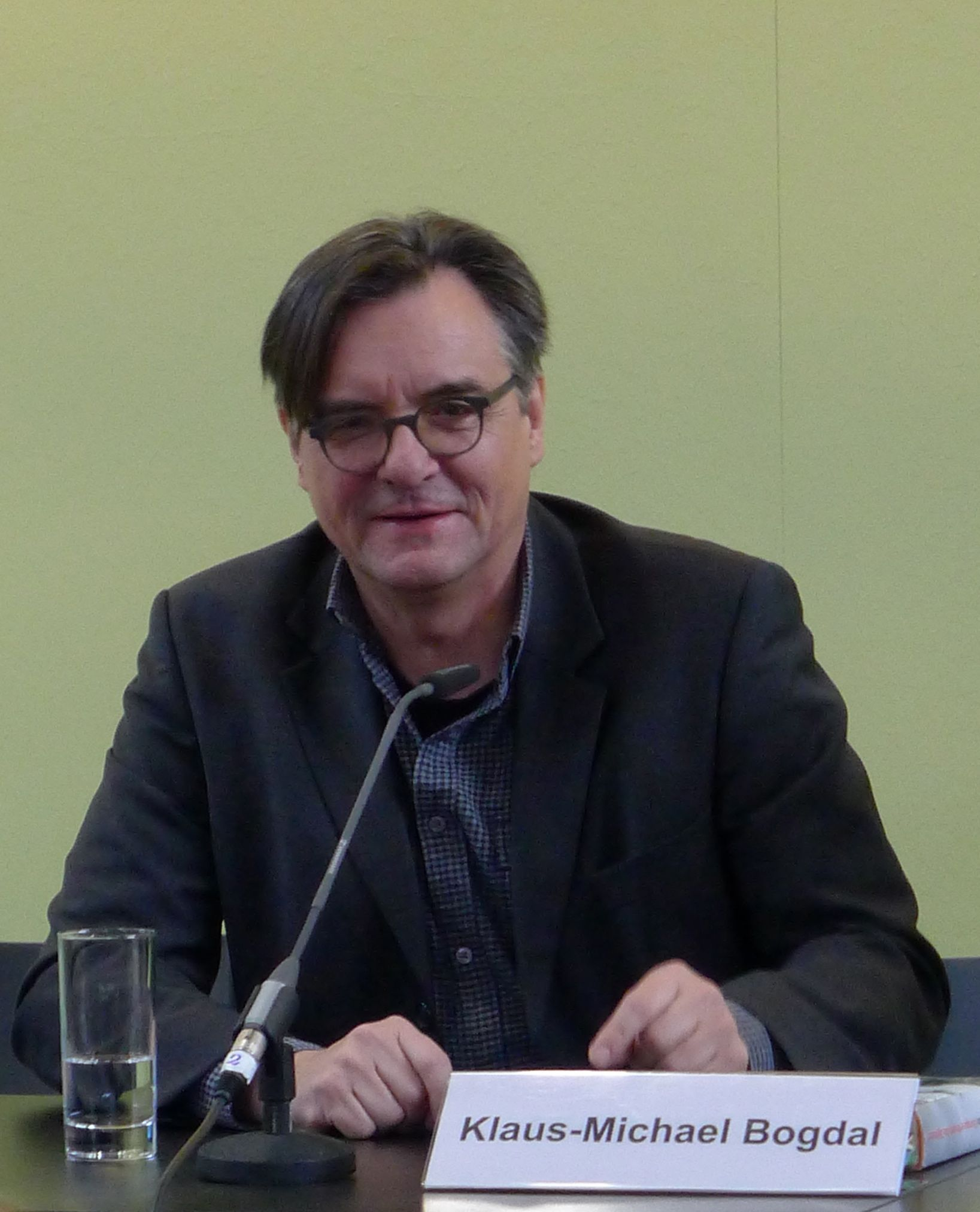
Klaus-Michael Bogdal

Klaus-Michael Bogdal (born 1948 in Gelsenkirchen) is a professor of German literature at the Faculty of Linguistics and Literature at Bielefeld University.

== Academia ==
Klaus-Michael Bogdal teaches and conducts research at Bielefeld University since 2001. He was head of several research projects, and between 2007 and 2009 he was on sabbatical within the scope of the opus-magnum program of the Volkswagen Foundation. He is associate editor of the journal “Der Deutschunterricht“ and of several academic series. Between 1997 and 2004, he was a member of the executive board of the Deutscher Germanistenverband, at the end as its vice chairman. In addition, he has been a member of the Germanist advisory board of the DAAD for several years, being its chairman since 2007. Since 2010 he has been assistant speaker of the postgraduate research school of the faculty of linguistics and literature. Among his main research aims are 19th and 20th century literature, theory of literature and history of science, literary anti-Semitism, research on alterity and stereotypes.

== Research ==
- Transformation of the contemporary literary field (Center for Interdisciplinary Research, 2010)
- Constructs of Europe and the European in German literary criticism and critique of contemporary civilization 1930–1960 (DFG, since 2009)
- Europe's invention of the Gypsies (Volkswagen Foundation, 2007–2009); Post-Auschwitz literary anti-Semitism (Center for Interdisciplinary Research, 2007)
- The reception of contemporary German literature on theater in France. The artist's self-image within the transfer of cultures (DFG, 2006–2009)
- Discourses on the Orient in German literature from the Middle Ages until present (2006)
- The absence of the work: After Foucault (Center for Interdisciplinary Research, 2004)
- Disorder (in cooperation with Canadian and Israeli researchers, EU, applied for).

== Selected publications ==
- 2010. Europa erfindet die Zigeuner. Eine Geschichte kultureller Gewalt. [Europe's Invention of the Gypsies: A History of Cultural Violence]. Suhrkamp, Berlin, ISBN 978-3-518-42263-2.
- 2008. Variationen über Literalität [Variations on Laterality]. In Schriftkultur und Schwellenkunde, eds. A. Geisenhanslüke and G. Mein, 121–144. Bielefeld: Transcript.
- 2008. Die Deterritorialisierten. Agambens Infamien. [The Deterritorialized Ones. Agamben's Disgrace] In Hannah Arendt und Giorgio Agamben. Parallelen. Kontroversen, eds. E. Geulen, K. Kauffmann, and G. Mein, 11–25. Munich.
- 2007. Historische Diskursanalyse der Literatur [Historical Discourse Analysis of Literature]. Heidelberg: Synchron Wissenschaftsverlag der Autoren.
- 2007. Lebenskunst, nicht Lebenswissenschaft. [The Art of Life, Not the Science of Life] lendemains 32(128): 92–97.
- 2007. Maschinen im Morgenland. Der Orient nach der Entdeckung des Öls. [Machines in the Orient: The Levant after the discovery of oil] In Orientdiskurse in der deutschen Literatur, ed. K.-M. Bogdal, 329–350. Bielefeld: Aisthesis.
- 2007. Literarischer Antisemitismus nach Auschwitz. Perspektiven der Forschung [Post-Auschwitz Literary Anti-Semitism: Perspectives of Research]. In Literarischer Antisemitismus nach Auschwitz, eds. K.-M. Bogdal, K. Holz, and M. N. Lorenz, 1–12. Stuttgart/Weimar: Metzler.
- 2007. „Dieses schwartz, ungestaltet und wildschweiffige Gesind“. Symbolische Codierung und literarische Diskursivierung der ‚Zigeuner’ vor 1800 [“This Black, Uncivilized, and Savage Mob“: Symbolic Encoding and Literary Discoursification of the “Gypsy” before 1800]. In Zwischen Erziehung und Vernichtung. Zigeunerpolitik und Zigeunerforschung im Europa des 20. Jahrhunderts, ed. M. Zimmermann, 71–108. Stuttgart: Franz Steiner Verlag.
- 2004. (EIN)FACH? Komplexität, Wissen, Fortschritt und die Grenzen der Germanistik. [A (SIMPLE) SPECIAL FIELD? Complexity, Knowledge, Progress, and the Limits of German Language and Literature]. In Grenzen der Germanistik. Rephilologisierung oder Erweiterung?, ed. W. Erhart, 104–127. Stuttgart/Weimar: Metzler.
- 2004. Alles nach Plan, alles im Griff. Der diskursive Raum der DDR-Literatur in den Fünfziger Jahren. [All According to Plan, Everything under Control: The Discursive Space of GDRLliterature in the 1950s]. In Soziale Räume und kulturelle Praktiken. Über den strategischen Gebrauch von Medien, eds. G. Mein and M. Rieger-Ladich, 123–148. Bielefeld: Transcript.
