= Starzyny, Silesian Voivodeship =

Starzyny
- Village
- Location within Poland
- Coordinates: 50°41′33″N 19°48′33″E
- Country: Poland
- Voivodeship: Silesian
- County: Zawiercie
- Gmina: Szczekociny
- Population: 260

Starzyny [staˈʐɨnɨ] is a village in the administrative district of Gmina Szczekociny, within Zawiercie County, Silesian Voivodeship, in southern Poland.
