= Szczekociny =

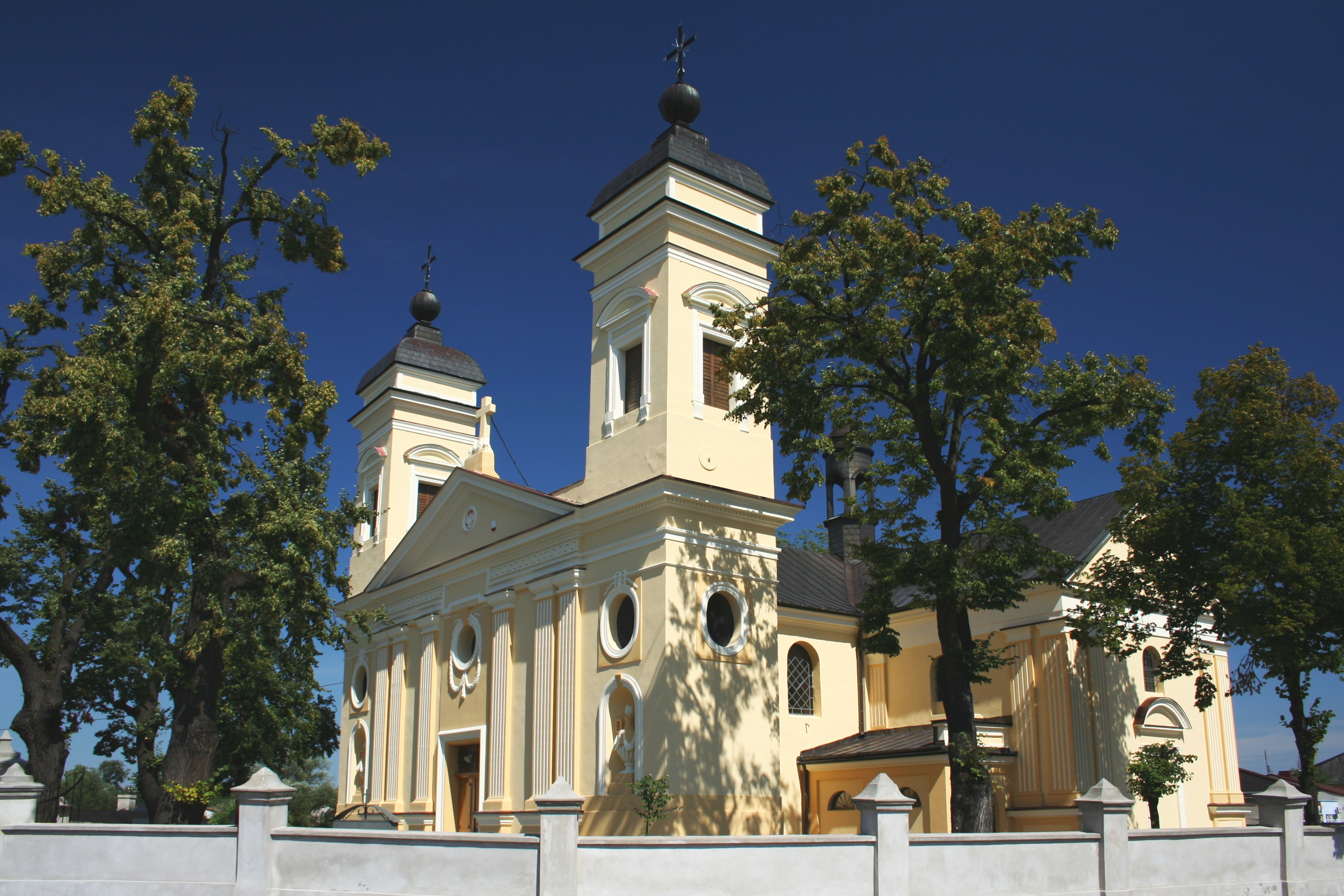
- Church of Saint Bartholomew

- Coat of arms

- Location within Poland
- Coordinates: 50°37′34″N 19°49′08″E
- Country: Poland
- Voivodeship: Silesian
- County: Zawiercie
- Gmina: Szczekociny
- First mentioned: 1307
- Town rights: 1398

Government
  - Mayor: Jacek Lipa

Area
  - Total: 17.98 km^{2} (6.94 sq mi)

Population (2019-06-30)
  - Total: 3,612
  - Density: 200.9/km^{2} (520.3/sq mi)
- Time zone: UTC+1 (CET)
  - Summer (DST): UTC+2 (CEST)
- Postal code: 42-445
- Area code: (+48)34
- Car plates: SZA
- Website: http://www.szczekociny.pl/

Szczekociny ([ʂt͡ʂɛkɔˈt͡ɕinɨ]) (Yiddish: שטעקעטשין, romanized: Shtshekotshin) is a town on the Pilica river, in Silesian Voivodeship, in southern Poland, with 3,612 inhabitants (2019).

Even though Szczekociny administratively belongs to the Silesian Voivodeship, it is part of the historic region of Lesser Poland. It was granted town rights in 1398.

== History ==
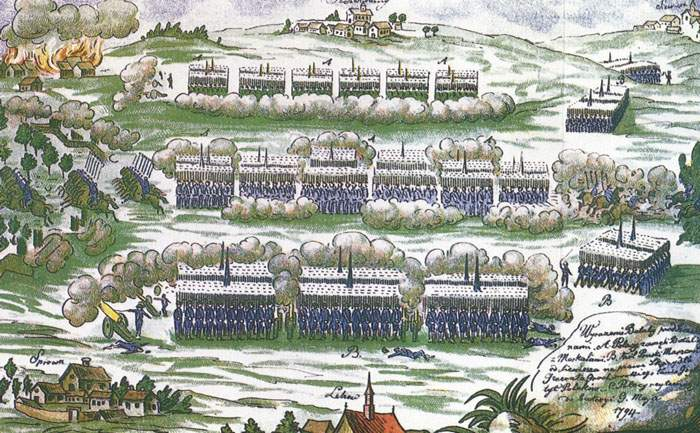
Battle of Szczekociny of 1794 by Michał Stachowicz

Szczekociny was the location of a motte-and-bailey castle from the 13th-14th century, which is now an archaeological site. The First mention of Szczekociny comes from 1307. At that time, the village belonged to the Odrowąż noble family. It was administratively located in Lelów County in the Kraków Voivodeship in the Lesser Poland Province of the Kingdom of Poland. In the late 14th century Szczekociny became the seat of the Odrowąż family, emerging as a local trade and craft center. It was granted town rights in 1398. In the 16th century, the town, together with other locations in Lesser Poland, enjoyed a period of prosperity known as the Polish Golden Age. In the mid-17th century, however, it was completely destroyed by the Swedes, during the Swedish invasion, and did not recover until the 18th century, when it belonged to the Dembiński noble family, whose efforts resulted in the reconstruction of most buildings. The owners remodelled the local parish church and built a palace, which still exists, and which in 1787 hosted King Stanislaus Augustus. The Battle of Szczekociny was fought near the town on June 6, 1794, during the Kościuszko Uprising.

After the Third Partition of Poland in 1795, Szczekociny was annexed by the Kingdom of Prussia, then it passed to the short-lived Duchy of Warsaw in 1807 and ultimately became part of Russian-controlled Congress Poland after Napoleon's defeat and the duchy's dissolution in 1815. In the 19th century Szczekociny changed hands several times, belonging to the families of Czacki, Lubieński and Halpert. During the January Uprising, on January 23, 1864, a Polish insurgent unit attacked Russian troops stationed in the town. As punishment for the uprising, in 1870 the Russian authorities demoted Szczekociny to the status of a village, and at that time, first Jews began to settle there.

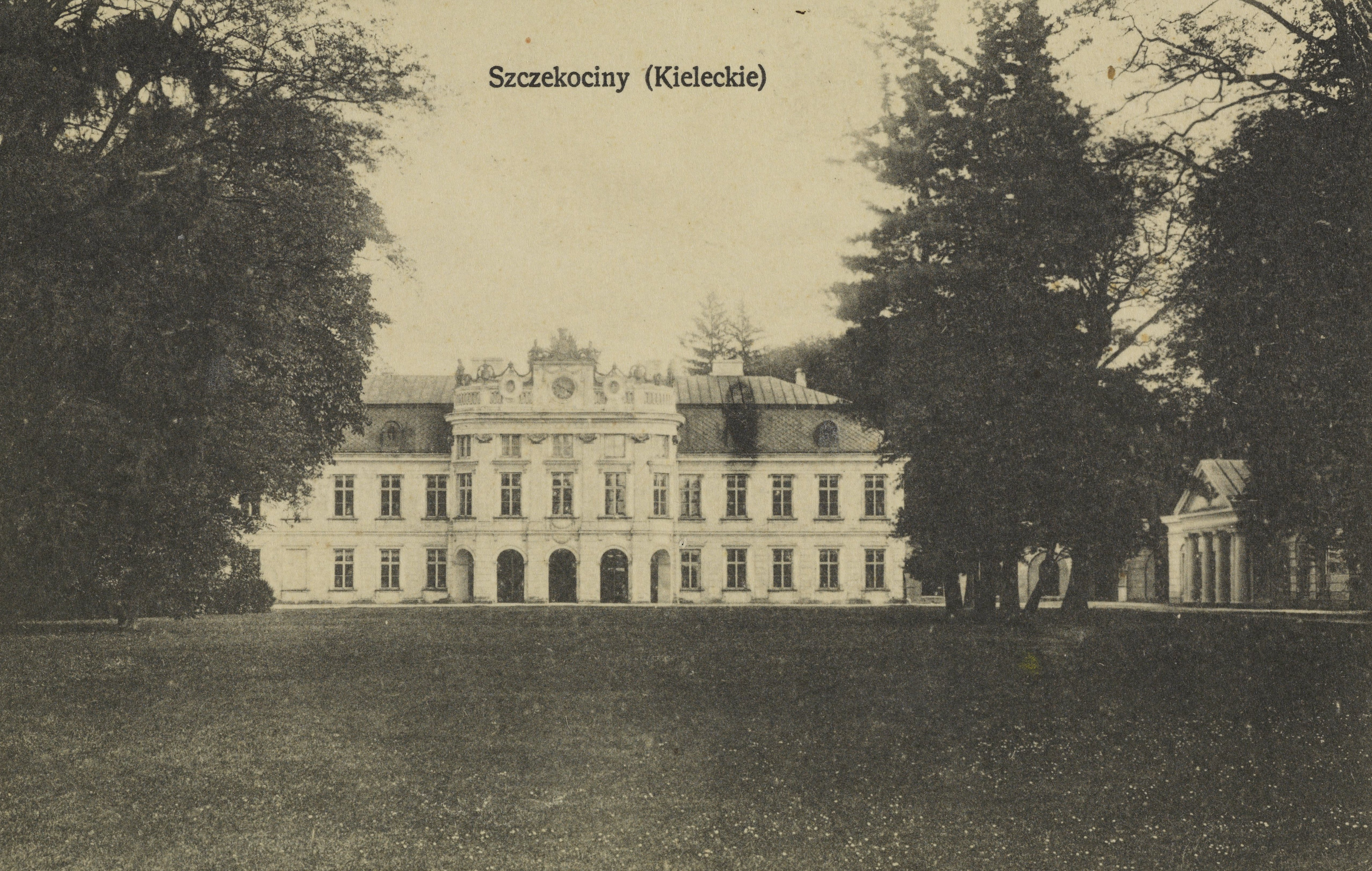
Dembiński Palace in the early 20th century

Following World War I, in 1918, Poland regained independence and control of Szczekociny. In the Second Polish Republic, it was part of Kielce Voivodeship, and on January 1, 1923, town rights were restored. In the 1920s Szczekociny had over 6,000 inhabitants, the most in its history.

Following the German-Soviet invasion of Poland, which started World War II in September 1939, the town was occupied by Germany until 1945. The war resulted in the deaths of 2,000 residents, including 90 percent of its Jewish residents, and the destruction of over 75% of the town. At least two Poles from Szczekociny were murdered by the Russians in the Katyn massacre in 1940. During the war Szczekociny was a major center of anti-German resistance. In the summer of 1944, as part of Operation Tempest, local Home Army units tried to capture Szczekociny, destroying bridges over the Pilica and the Żebrówka rivers.

Since 1999, it has belonged to the Silesian Voivodeship, despite the fact that it had never been part of Silesia.

On 3 March 2012 a train crash took place near Szczekociny, when two passenger trains collided head-on. 16 passengers were killed. The incident provoked condolences from the leaders of a number of European countries.

== Points of interest ==
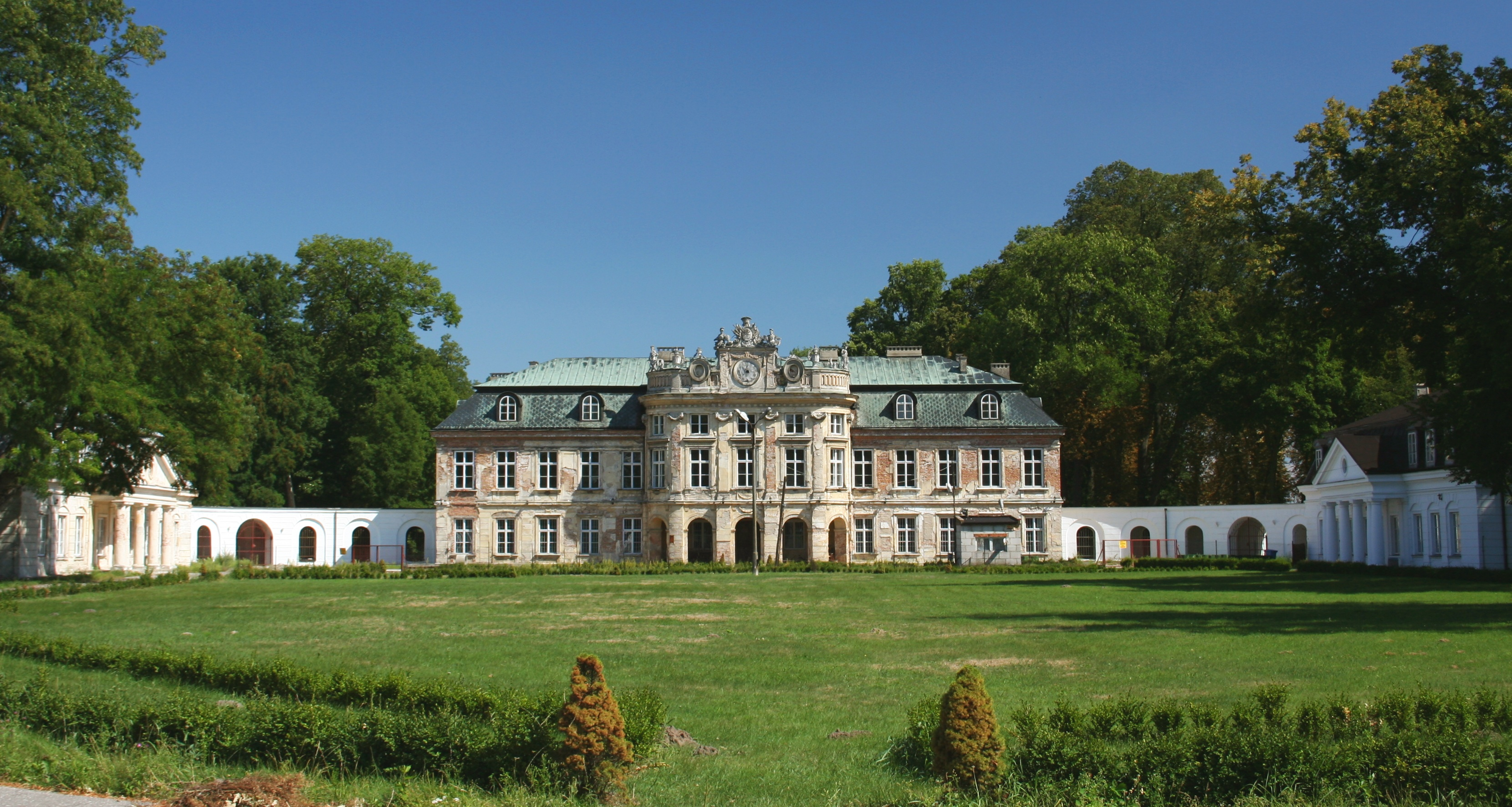
Dembiński Palace in 2008

- Dembiński Palace (1770s), surrounded by a park,
- St. Bartholomew Parish Church (ca. 1680), remodelled in the 1780s by Urszula Dembińska

== Jewish community of Szczekociny ==
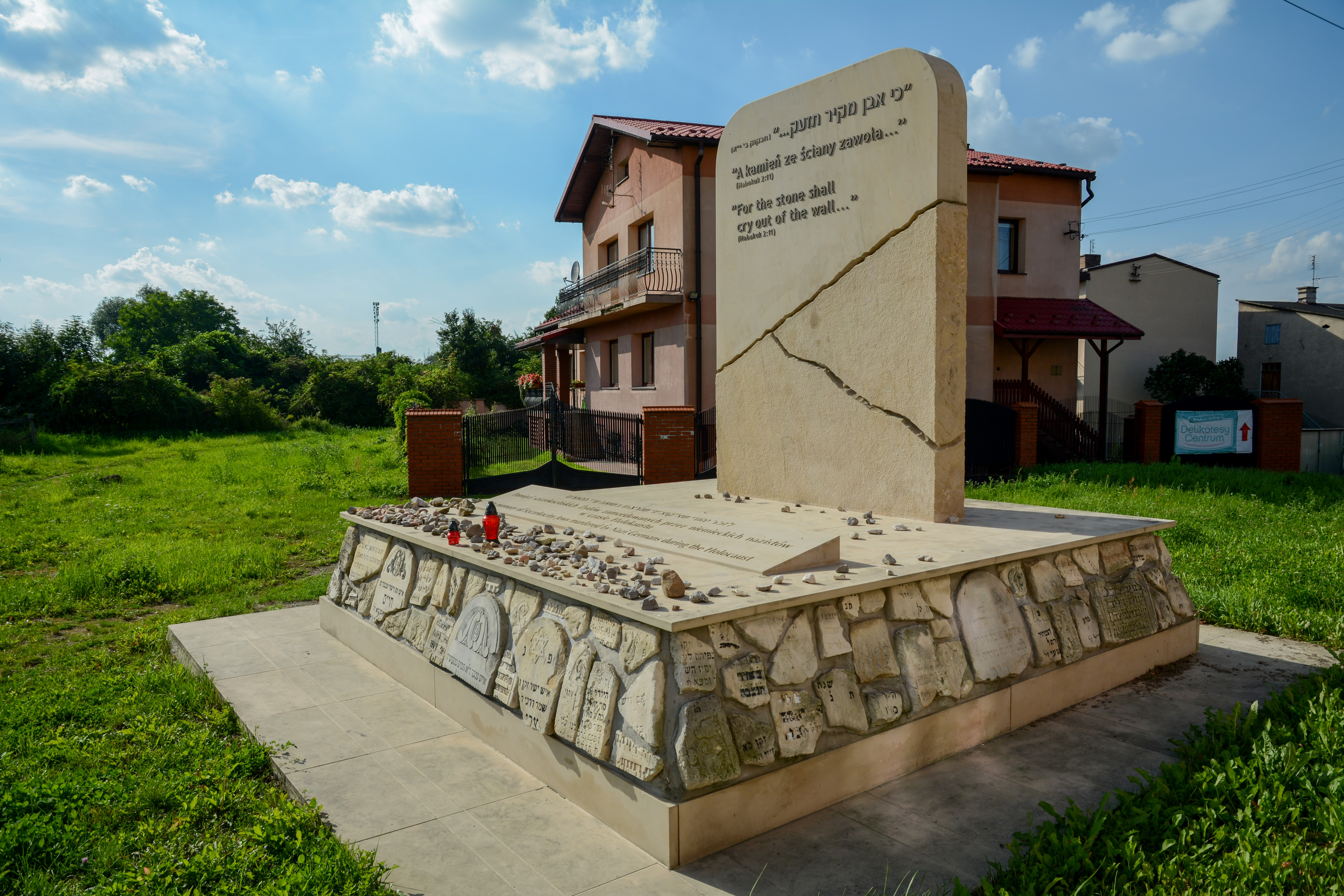
Monument to local Jews murdered by Nazi Germans during the Holocaust

In 1937, two years before the outbreak of the Second World War, there were 3,018 Jews in Szczekociny, which made up slightly more than 50% of the entire number of inhabitants. Pictures of the remains of the Jewish part can be viewed at Szczekociny – YouTube. In 1942 according to the Nazi German plans for the Final Solution, 1,500 Jewish residents of Szczekociny were deported to the Treblinka extermination camp. Others were shot in Szczekociny or Sedziszow, where they were taken before their final deportation.

A group of Jews from Szczekociny, including two families with children, was hidden by Polish farmer Jan Molenda in the nearby village of Sprowa, however the Germans discovered the hideout, murdered captured Jews on the spot and arrested Molenda, who luckily managed to escape and hide from the Germans until the end of the occupation (see Rescue of Jews by Poles during the Holocaust).

Some 10% of the Jewish residents survived the genocide, such as Izik Mendel Bornstein, who survived amongst others Auschwitz. Bornstein's son Yossi (founder and CEO of Shizim Group) has been at the forefront of renegotiating the relationship with a renovation of the current cemetery and synagogue, under the now full support of the local mayor. Another witness and survivor is Wolf Zylbersztajn (1919-2011). Wolf Zylbersztajn's story is retold by his son Daniel Zylbersztajn. Auschwitz survivor Leon Zelman (1928-2007) also writes in the first chapters of his book "Ein Leben nach dem Überleben" about his childhood and youth in Szczekocziny.

== Sports ==
The local football club is Sparta Szczekociny. It competes in the lower leagues.

The Polish Cyclo-cross Championships were held in Szczekociny in 2010 and 2020.

== Notable people ==
- Dow Ber Meisels (1798–1870), Chief Rabbi of Kraków and Warsaw
- Władysław Strzemiński (1893–1952), painter
- Katarzyna Kobro (1898–1951), sculptor
- Leon Zelman (1928–2007), Polish-Austrian publicist

== Twin towns – sister cities ==
See twin towns of Gmina Szczekociny.
