= Popieluszko: Freedom Is Within Us =

2009 Polish film

- DVD cover
- Directed by: Rafal Wieczynski
- Written by: Rafal Wieczynski
- Produced by: Julita Swiercz Wieczynska; Focus Productions
- Starring: Adam Woronowicz
- Cinematography: Grzegorz Kedzierski
- Music by: Pawel Sydor
- Distributed by: Focus Productions
- Release dates: 16 February 2009; 27 February 2009 (Poland)
- Running time: 149 minutes
- Country: Poland
- Language: Polish
- Budget: 12,000,000 PLN

Popieluszko: Freedom Is Within Us (Polish: Popiełuszko. Wolność jest w nas) is a 2009 Polish film written and directed by Rafal Wieczynski. This film is based on real life events of Polish Catholic priest Jerzy Popiełuszko. The filming took eight months, from August 2007 and April 2008.

In a DVD published by Ignatius Press, and especially Blu-ray, there are special features (or extras) included in the film: documentary on the making of the film (21 minutes), Victors Don't Die: The Story of Fr. Jerzy Popiełuszko (50-minute documentary), and the film trailer.

== Plot ==
The movie focuses the life of a priest, who was martyred by three secret agents in Poland under communist regime.

The story covers Father Jerzy's life from childhood, through his military service in a special unit for clerics, and finally his adult life, with an emphasis on Popiełuszko's religious and patriotic activities.

Father Jerzy Popiełuszko is a legend of the Solidarity movement. Alfons was born on the Białystok region, 1947, and he was ordained a priest in May 1972 by Cardinal Stefan Wyszyński as Father Jerzy, then serve as a chaplain for Warsaw nurses who worked at the academic church of St. Anne. In June 1980, Father Jerzy was assigned to the parish of St. Stanislaus Kostka in Żoliborz, then he provided pastoral care to striking steelworkers at the Warsaw Steelworks during the August Agreements strike in 1980. As a result, Father Jerzy chaplain of Solidarity the August 1980 strikes. On 13 December 1981, after the martial law was declared, Father Jerzy persevered as he supported Solidarity. Together with the parish priest, Monsignor Teofil Bogucki, he organized Masses for the Homeland, attracting thousands of faithful from various backgrounds. He actively participated in charitable activities, which extended to the victims of martial law, and his apartment became a point of contact for activists and supporters of the banned trade union. He was one of the initiators of the Pilgrimage of Working People to Jasna Góra in September 1983. Earlier, in May 1983, he led the funeral of Grzegorz Przemyk, a Warsaw high school graduate and the son of Barbara Sadowska, a poet sympathizer with the opposition, who was beaten by militiamen. The communist authorities attempted to curtail Father Jerzy's activities, which were gaining widespread public support. Accused of abusing church institutions and practices to pursue political activities, he was provoked and surveilled by the Security Service. After a search of his apartment—where explosives and printing materials had been previously found—he was arrested on charges of conducting "activity detrimental to the interests of the Polish People's Republic," a charge punishable by up to 10 years in prison. Following the intervention of church authorities, he was released from custody. Despite ongoing preparations for his trial, Father Popiełuszko continued his activities and, moreover, refused a study trip to the Vatican, suggested by the Primate, Cardinal Józef Glemp. In October 1984, he was abducted and then brutally murdered by officers of the Fourth Department (anti-church) of the Ministry of Internal Affairs. Father Jerzy Popiełuszko's funeral turned into a demonstration of opposition to the methods of state coercion, attended by thousands. Father Jerzy's grave became a pilgrimage site for the faithful from Poland and around the world, including Pope John Paul II. The priest's beatification process is currently underway.

== Cast ==
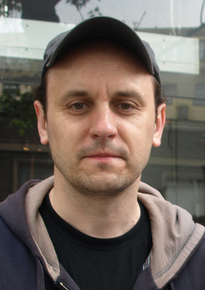
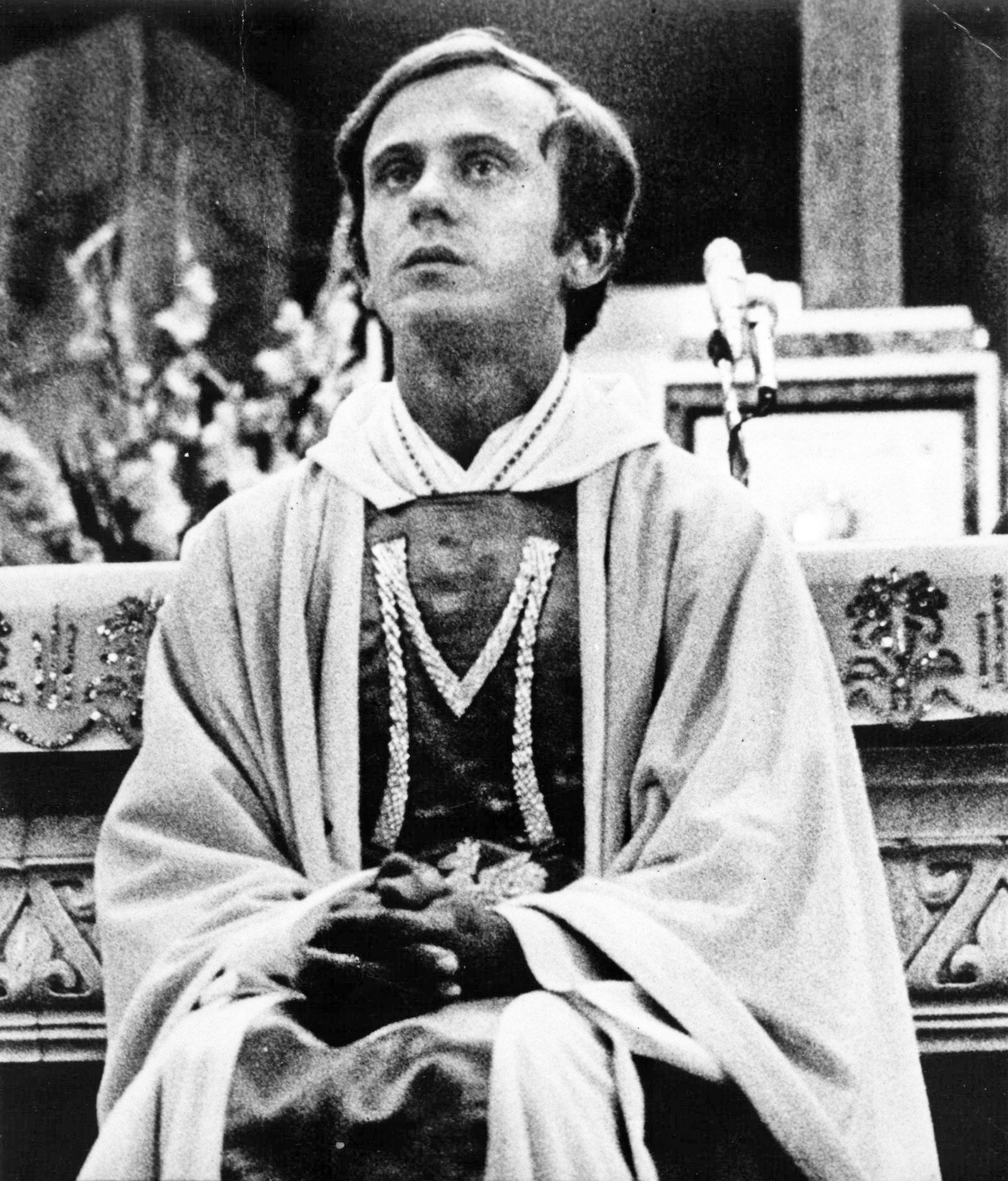
Adam Woronowicz as Father Jerzy Popiełuszko

- Adam Woronowicz as Jerzy Popiełuszko
- Artur Balczynski as Young Wladyslaw Popieluszko, Jerzy's father
- Adam Biedrzycki as Father Adam
- Teresa Bielinska as Nun
- Witold Bielinski as Army Officer
- Katarzyna Boguslawska as Ambulance Dispatcher
- Kazimierz Borowiec as Wladyslaw Popieluszko, Jerzy's father
- Filip Budweil as Corporal
- Dorota Calek as Sister Gertruda
- Jacek Rozenek as Grzegorz Piotrowski
- Szymon Cempura as Father Lewandowski
- Kacper Kuniawka as Józef Popieluszko, Jerzy's brother
- Alina Chechelska as Marianna Popieluszko, Jerzy's mother
- Agnieszka Jaworska as Young Marianna Popieluszko, Jerzy's mother
- Karolina Demianiuk as Grandmother
- Piotr Duda as SB Agent
- Wojciech Solarz as Florian
- Agata Piotrowska as Agata Piotrowska-Mastalerz, prosecutor
- Pope John Paul II as himself (archival footage; uncredited)
- Wojciech Jaruzelski as himself (archival footage; uncredited)

== Locations filmed ==
Several locations were filmed in the set, including Suchowola, Bartoszyce, Warsaw (Church of St. Stanislaus Kostka, Church of the Immaculate Conception of the Blessed Virgin Mary in Warsaw, Krakowskie Przedmieście Street, Bankowy Square, Zelazna Street, Śląsko-Dąbrowski Bridge, Marshal Józef Piłsudski Square, Tomb of the Unknown Soldier, Primate's Palace, Old Town, Higher Metropolitan Seminary, District Court, police station on Jezuicka Street, Warsaw Steelworks, Smocza Street), road near Radzymin, Kraków (Church of St. Maximilian Kolbe), Katowice (train station), Bukowina Tatrzańska, "Głodówka" Center, Morskie Oko, Częstochowa (Jasna Góra), Bytom (Church of the Exaltation of the Holy Cross), Gdańsk (Basilica of St. Bridget), Bydgoszcz (Church of the Holy Polish Brothers Martyrs, Fordon Bridge), and a dam on the Vistula River in Włocławek.

== TV series ==
The 2013 four-part series, produced using material from the 2009 feature film of the same title, depicts the life of Solidarity chaplain Father Jerzy Popiełuszko. The series includes new sequences that more fully depict the stages of the protagonist's life and his family and social relationships, including his family home in Okopy, his time in the army, his pastoral work among medical students and nurses, and the situation at the presbytery of St. Stanislaus Kostka Church in Warsaw. The methods used by Security Service officers to investigate people are shown in greater detail than in the cinema version. The scenes in which Cardinal Józef Glemp took part convey the tension of the period preceding the introduction of martial law in the People's Republic of Poland in 1981. The viewer also learns where Father Popiełuszko got his dog and why it was called Tajny (Secret).

== See also ==
- To Kill a Priest
