= Cassock of Jerzy Popiełuszko =

Clothing relic

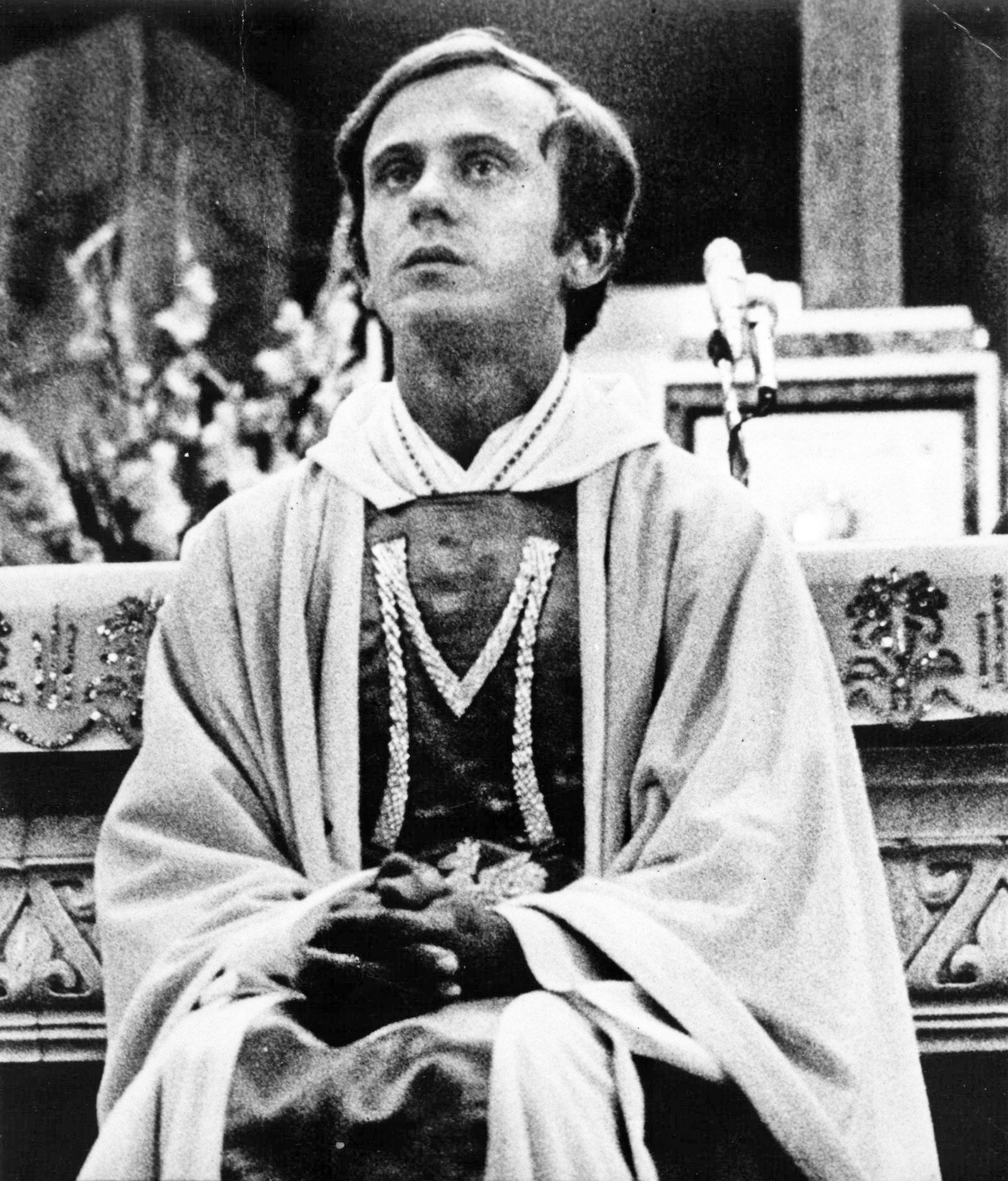
Father Jerzy Popiełuszko

The cassock of Father Jerzy Popiełuszko, including the clerical collar, shirt, and other items associated with him underwent conservation and is on display after his assassination.

== Background ==
Born on 14 September 1947 in Okopy, Białystok, Alfons entered the seminary after graduating high school, then he was forced to serve in Bartoszyce military. Despite the communist indoctrination, Alfons had a strong faith in being a Catholic. Then, as Father Jerzy, he served in several Archdiocese of Warsaw parishes, including youth ministry and healthcare.

While on his last journey to the parish of the Holy Polish Martyr Brothers in Bydgoszcz, Father Jerzy was brutally murdered by Security Service. After the assassination and the body discovery of Father Jerzy on, his funeral took place on 3 November 1984.

== Cassock ==
The conservation of cassock was carried out by Joanna Sielska, who collaborated with the Auschwitz Museum and the Warsaw Uprising Museum. In addition to the conservation, the cassock contains DNA, protein, and genetic traces.

According to Paweł Kęska, the items, including the cassock, associated with Father Jerzy bear traces of the assassination. The cassock, in addition to bearing traces of the assassination, are torn, stained, and muddy. Then, the items were transferred to the Archdiocese of Warsaw after the Toruń trial had concluded.

The cassock, including items associated with Father Jerzy, is placed on specialized, armored display cases so it is available to the faithful.

== See also ==
- Relics associated with Jerzy Popiełuszko
