= Relics associated with Jerzy Popiełuszko =

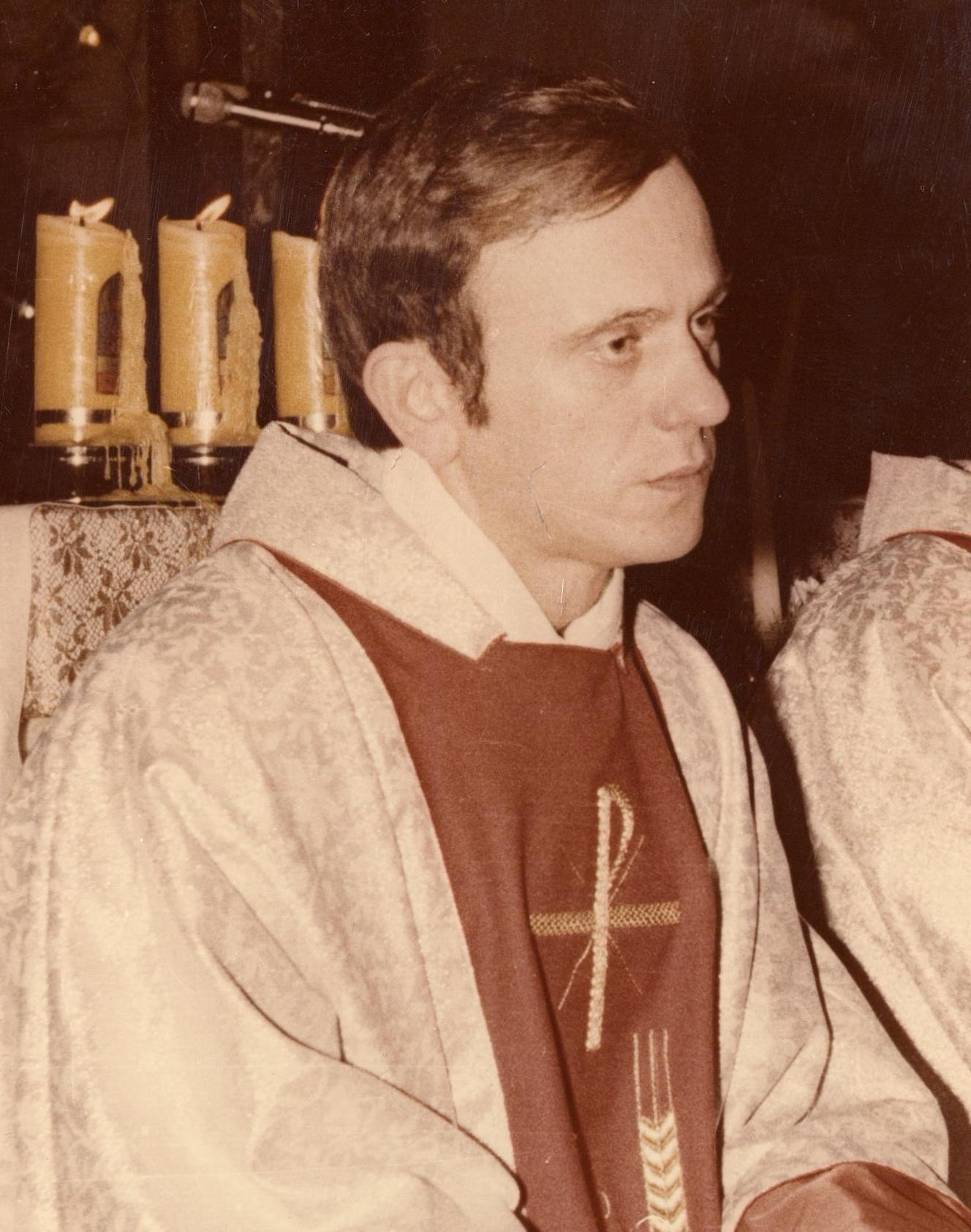
Father Jerzy Popiełuszko.

The relics of Jerzy Popiełuszko, a 37-year-old Polish Catholic priest, were saved and preserved after his assassination.

== Background ==
Twelve days after the assassination, while performing the autopsy on the body of Father Jerzy, Jan Szrzedziński, a doctor and a physician at the Department of Forensic Medicine of the Medical Academy in Białystok, attempted to declare Father Jerzy as a saint. Although it cost him his life and loss of job, Dr. Jan removed two vials of blood, along with fragments of the liver, spleen, and kidney to be turned into future relics.

== Cassock of Father Jerzy ==
The cassock of Father Jerzy Popiełuszko, including the clerical collar, shirt, and other items associated with him underwent conservation and is on display after the assassination.

== List of relics incidences ==
There are incidences of Father Jerzy relics, especially that were transferred as a celebration during masses.

Location	Date	Summary	Reference(s)
Syców, Poland	21 June 2025	In the Church of Our Lady of Częstochowa, the relics were brought and the transferring was performed by Father Jerzy's brother, Jozef Popiełuszko. The transferring was celebrated by Father Andrzej Buryła, along with co-celebrator Father Adam Gmerek.	
Boston, Lincolnshire, England	9–10 May 2022	A reliquary containing the blood relic of Father Jerzy was stolen at St. Nicolas Church between 16:00 BST and 08:55 BST on the next day.	
Wiejska Street, Warsaw, Poland	19 October 2024	During the 30th anniversary of Father Jerzy assassination, the relics were introduced and given to the Sejm chapel for a special mass	
Koszalin, Poland	7 November 2025	During the 45th anniversary of its founding, the relics of Father Jerzy, along with Cardinal Stefan Wyszyński, were brought to Koszalin parish for solemn mass celebrated by bishop Krzystof Zadarko.	
Warsaw and Białystok, Poland	May 2010	At the request of archbishop Edward Ozorowski, the relics hidden in the wall were excavated just few weeks before the beautification ceremony and the remains of Father Jerzy were found to be in perfect conditions. They were placed in silver reliquary shaped like a Romanesque church. Therefore, the reliquary has been housed in the Church of Resurrection in Białystok	
Strzegom, Poland	19 October 2024	On the 41st anniversary of the assassination, the relics were ceremonially brought into Minor Basilica, as well as they were made of two stones	
Brescia, Italy	25 October 2017	The bone fragments relics from Father Jerzy, along with the blood of Pope John Paul II, were stolen from the Montecastello sanctuary.	
Greenpoint, Brooklyn, New York, USA	October 17, 2010	The relics was blessed at St. Stanislaus Kostka Church.	
Worcester, Massachusetts, USA	October 19, 2020	Our Lady of Częstochowa Parish's newly acquired relics were installed on the feast day of Father Jerzy.	
Budapest, Hungary	14 September 2022	The relics were handed over to the parish of St. Mary of the Stone (Kövi Szűz Mária) during the ceremony in archbishop's palace of the Polish capital by Cardinal Kazimierz Nycz.	
Bełchatów, Poland	19 October 2025	During the ceremony honoring Father Jerzy on the 41st anniversary of his assassination, the relics arrived at the Bełchatów parish.	

== See also ==
- Cassock of Jerzy Popiełuszko
