= To Kill a Priest =

- Theatrical release poster
- Directed by: Agnieszka Holland
- Screenplay by: Agnieszka Holland; Jean-Yves Pitoun
- Story by: Agnieszka Holland
- Produced by: Jean-Pierre Alessandri
- Starring: Christopher Lambert; Ed Harris; David Suchet; Tim Roth; Joanne Whalley; Pete Postlethwaite; Cherie Lunghi; Joss Ackland
- Cinematography: Adam Holender
- Edited by: Hervé de Luze
- Music by: Georges Delerue
- Production companies: J.P. Productions; FR3 Films Production
- Distributed by: AMLF (France); Columbia Pictures (International)
- Release dates: September 7, 1988 (France); October 13, 1989 (USA)
- Running time: 117 minutes
- Country: France
- Language: English

To Kill a Priest is a 1988 drama film directed by Agnieszka Holland. The film tells a story based on the murder, under the Polish Communist regime, of the priest Jerzy Popiełuszko. It stars Christopher Lambert as a fictionalized version of Popiełuszko and Ed Harris as the secret police captain set to assassinate him.

== Cast ==
- Christopher Lambert as Father Alek
- Ed Harris as Stefan
- Joss Ackland as Colonel
- Tim Roth as Feliks
- Timothy Spall as Igor
- Pete Postlethwaite as Josef
- Cherie Lunghi as Halina
- Joanne Whalley as Anna
- David Suchet as Bishop
- Jerome Flynn as Traffic militiaman
- Vincent Grass

== Discography ==
The CD soundtrack composed and conducted by Georges Delerue is available on the Music Box Records label (website). The main theme, "Crimes of Cain", was written and performed by Joan Baez.

== Reception ==
=== Critical response ===
To Kill a Priest has an approval rating of 67% on review aggregator website Rotten Tomatoes, based on 6 reviews, and an average rating of 5.8/10.

== See also ==
- Popieluszko: Freedom Is Within Us
