= Solidarity chaplaincy of Jerzy Popiełuszko =

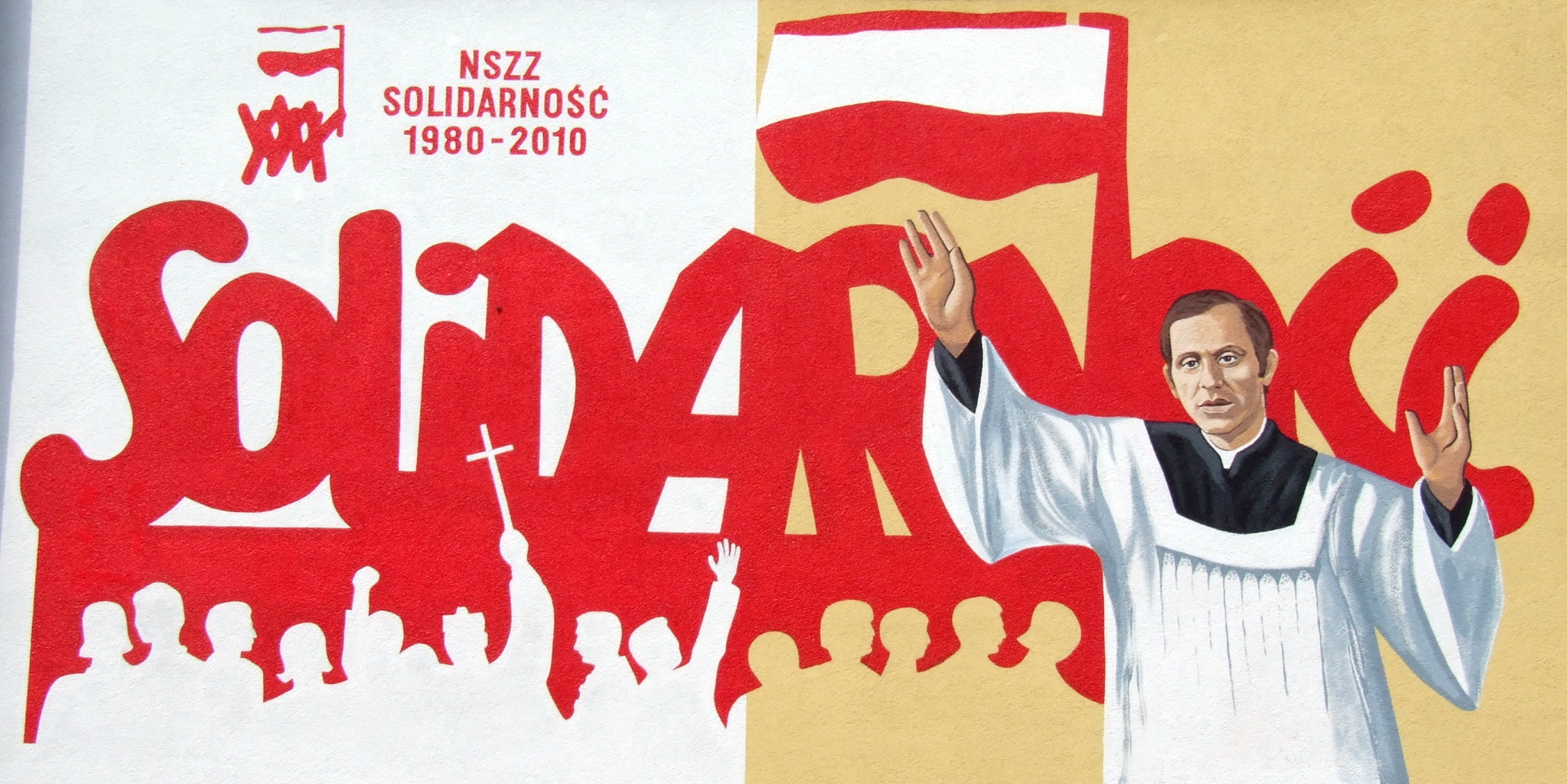
Father Jerzy Popiełuszko, depicted in a mural, publicly supported Solidarity and was appointed a chaplain

Jerzy Popiełuszko, a Polish Catholic priest, had a history of serving Solidarity as a chaplain from 1980 to 1984 (until his death).

== Father Jerzy Popiełuszko ==
Jerzy (Alfons) Popiełuszko was born on 14 September 1947 in the small village of Okopy. He is best known of one of the young priests who identified himself with the Solidarity movement in 1980.

== August Agreements ==
During the strike between 31 August and 1 September 1980, an agreement was signed managed by Warsaw Steelworks. The decision was to end the strike.

== History with Solidarity ==
Father Jerzy had been appointed patron of the independent, self-governing trade union Solidarity by Warsaw steelworkers from 1980 to 1984 in Warsaw. As a chaplain of the trade union, Father Jerzy became actively involved in Solidarity's activities, including the aids he organized for those who were persecuted by the communists. Due to his courageous acts and his willingness to help those in need, Father Jerzy's popularity spread across Warsaw, then later throughout Poland. Father Jerzy was a priest at St. Stanislaus Kostka Church, in Warsaw.

On 19 May 1983, Father Jerzy attended the funeral of a teenaged poet Grzegorz Przemyk who died, then he organized a pilgrimage to working people of Jasna Góra in September that year. Father Jerzy said in the homilies that violence is a weakness and not a strength, and in order to remain internally free is to maintain dignity, as well as to overcome fear.

On 19 October 1984, people in Poland were shocked when they heard the abduction and assassination of Father Jerzy.

Celebrated from February 1981 on the last Sunday of each month, the Masses for the Homeland was one of the characteristics Father Jerzy was involved. They attracted roughly thousands of people.

== Legacy ==
On 28 August 2014, the appointing of Father Jerzy as a patron of Solidarity was authorized by Pope Francis via the Congregation for Divine Worship and the Discipline of the Sacraments.

On the 15th anniversary of the beatification of Father Jerzy, the special mass was celebrated by the newly ordained priests from the Łowicz diocese. During a homily, the newly ordained priest quoted Father Jerzy: "How lightly one suffers when one suffers for Christ."

Solidarity chairman Waldemar Bartosz asserted that Father Jerzy was important and that he remains a role model for those within the trade union during the 41st anniversary of the assassination.

== See also ==
- Solidarity (Polish trade union)
