= Don't Cry, It's Only Thunder =

1982 film by Peter Werner

- Directed by: Peter Werner
- Written by: Paul G. Hensler
- Produced by: Walt deFaria; Paul G. Hensler; Ken Karawai; Terry Ogisu; Shintaro Tsuji
- Starring: Dennis Christopher; Susan Saint James; Roger Aaron Brown; James Whitmore Jr.
- Cinematography: Donald McAlpine
- Edited by: Barbara Pokras; Jack Woods
- Music by: Maurice Jarre
- Distributed by: Sanrio
- Release date: March 12, 1982
- Running time: 108 minutes
- Country: United States
- Language: English

Don't Cry, It's Only Thunder (also known in Australia as Vietnam: Hell or Glory) is a 1982 American war drama film directed by Peter Werner and written by Paul G. Hensler, set in the Vietnam War.

== Synopsis ==
The story centers around Brian Anderson (played by actor Dennis Christopher), a U.S. Army soldier serving in South Vietnam, who is only out for his own neck, who ends up drawn into taking care of orphans in a nearby orphanage, keeping a promise to a friend who was killed in action. At first, he views the task with a degree of annoyance, then slowly begins to warm up to the orphans, risking his life and his career to protect them. Robert Englund (pre-dating his more-well-known role of Freddy Krueger) played the role of Tripper. Susan Saint James played a doctor and the love interest to Brian Anderson.

== Background and reception ==
Paul G. Hensler, the film's screenwriter, was a Vietnam veteran who wanted a film that showed both the "humanitarians" among Americans sent to Vietnam as well as the victims and corruption in war. Although the film portrayed military corruption and the war's victims, the Defense Department supported it. The Army was reported as mixed to positive about the film. Despite the film's mixed view of the military, and its intended criticism of war, the military approved of the main character being a person who matured due to the war, becoming a person who loved and tried to save orphans. The writer indicated he did not mean to show war as necessary for his maturing, indicating that the Peace Corps or something else would be as good or better. Still, the maturing of the character and showing a humanitarian side to Americans in Vietnam pleased the military, which at that time was dealing with films on Vietnam focusing on soldiers who were destructive or even nightmarish people.

The film was shot in the Philippines.

It was criticized for sentimentality, but overall received good critical reviews. Nevertheless, it was a commercial failure. This has been blamed on its relatively poor production values and its reportedly having a complicated, rather than simply positive or negative, view of the war.
