= Paul G. Hensler =

- Born: United States
- Occupation: Screenwriter

Paul G. Hensler is a screenwriter and actor. He wrote Don't Cry, It's Only Thunder, which he appeared in, and co-wrote Gotcha!

== Early life ==
Hensler joined the U.S. Army and served in Vietnam during the Vietnam War in 1966.

== Work ==
Hensler acted as a military advisor for Apocalypse Now, Deer Hunter, More American Graphitti, Boys In Company C, An Officer and A Gentlemen, Heroes, and wrote and co-produced Don't Cry, It's Only Thunder which was based on his own experiences of the Vietnam War. He went on to write the Book Don't Cry It's Only Thunder. He cites his Catholic faith as important to him, which relates to his purchase of the rights to The Priest & The Policeman in 1988. Mr Hensler kept the project close and finally produced the feature documentary Jerzy Popieluszko: Messenger of the Truth.

Mr. Hensler is also developing "The Burning" written by Tim Madigan for Warner Brothers and a limited series. In addition, Mr. Hensler owns the rights to The Luciano Years in New York which is in active development. The final project on his agenda is La Popessa, the true story of Mother Leinhert who spent 50 years inside the Vatican walls at the side of Pope John Paul VI and became the most powerful woman in Vatican history.
