= Jerzy Popiełuszko =

Polish Roman Catholic priest and martyr (1947–1984)

Blessed Jerzy Popiełuszko
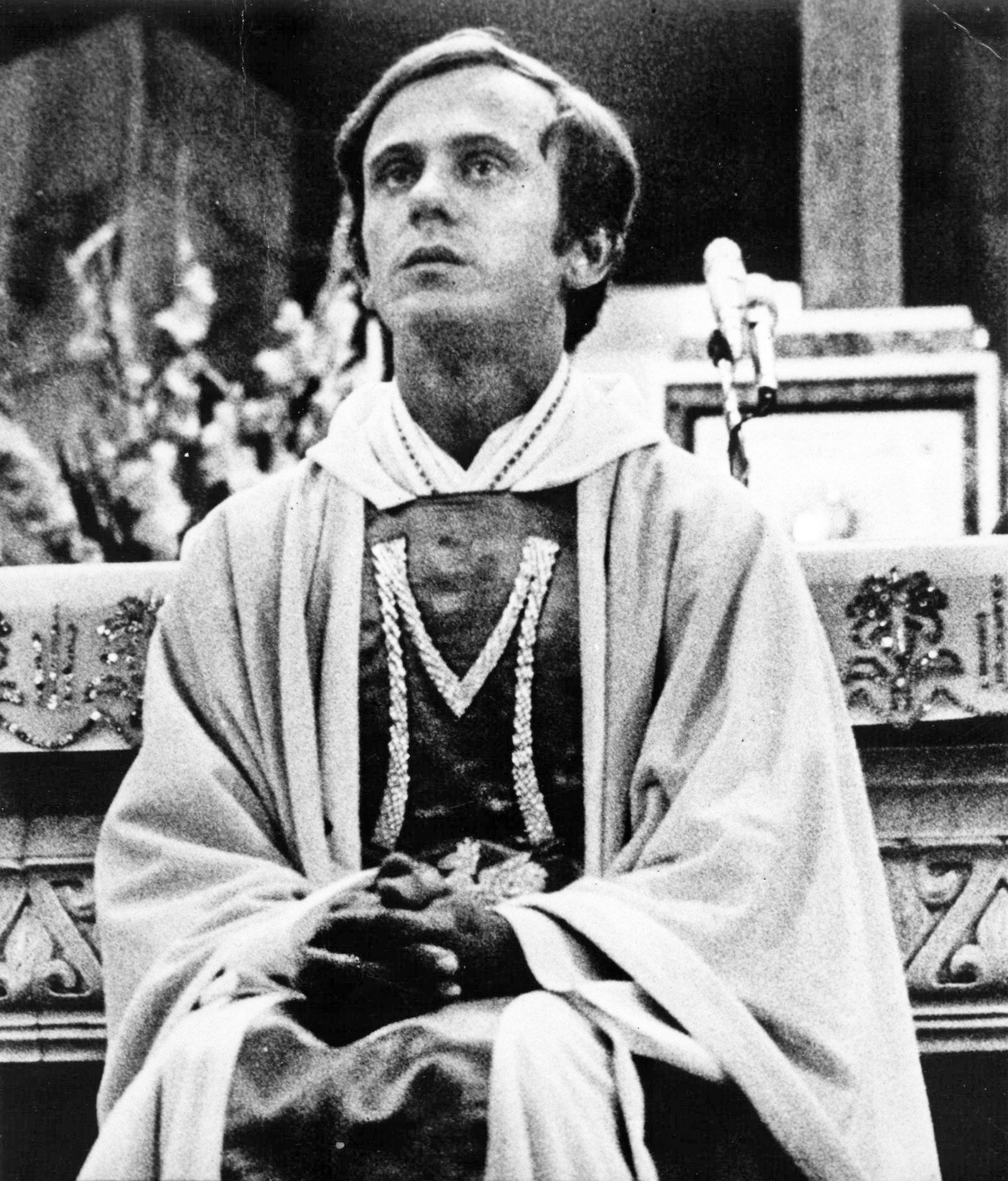

Martyr
- Born: 14 September 1947; Okopy, near Suchowola, Republic of Poland
- Died: 19 October 1984 (aged 37); Włocławek, Polish People's Republic
- Venerated in: Roman Catholic Church
- Beatified: 6 June 2010, Warsaw, Poland by Archbishop Angelo Amato on behalf of Pope Benedict XVI
- Feast: 19 October
- Attributes: Cassock
- Patronage: Solidarity persecuted Christians victims of Communist totalitarianism
- Popiełuszko's voice Popiełuszko celebrating Rosary Devotions and Holy Mass in Bydgoszcz; Recorded 19 October 1984

Jerzy Aleksander Popiełuszko (Polish pronunciation: [ˈjɛʐɨ a.lɛkˈsan.dɛr popʲɛˈwuʂkɔ] born Alfons Popiełuszko; 14 September 1947 – 19 October 1984) was a Polish Roman Catholic priest who became associated with the opposition Solidarity trade union in communist Poland. He was murdered in 1984 by three agents of the Security Service, who were shortly thereafter tried and convicted of the murder.

Popiełuszko has been recognized as a martyr by the Roman Catholic Church and was beatified on 6 June 2010 by Cardinal Angelo Amato on behalf of Pope Benedict XVI. An alleged miracle attributed to his intercession, which could lead to his canonization, is now under investigation.

== Biography ==
=== Early life and priesthood ===
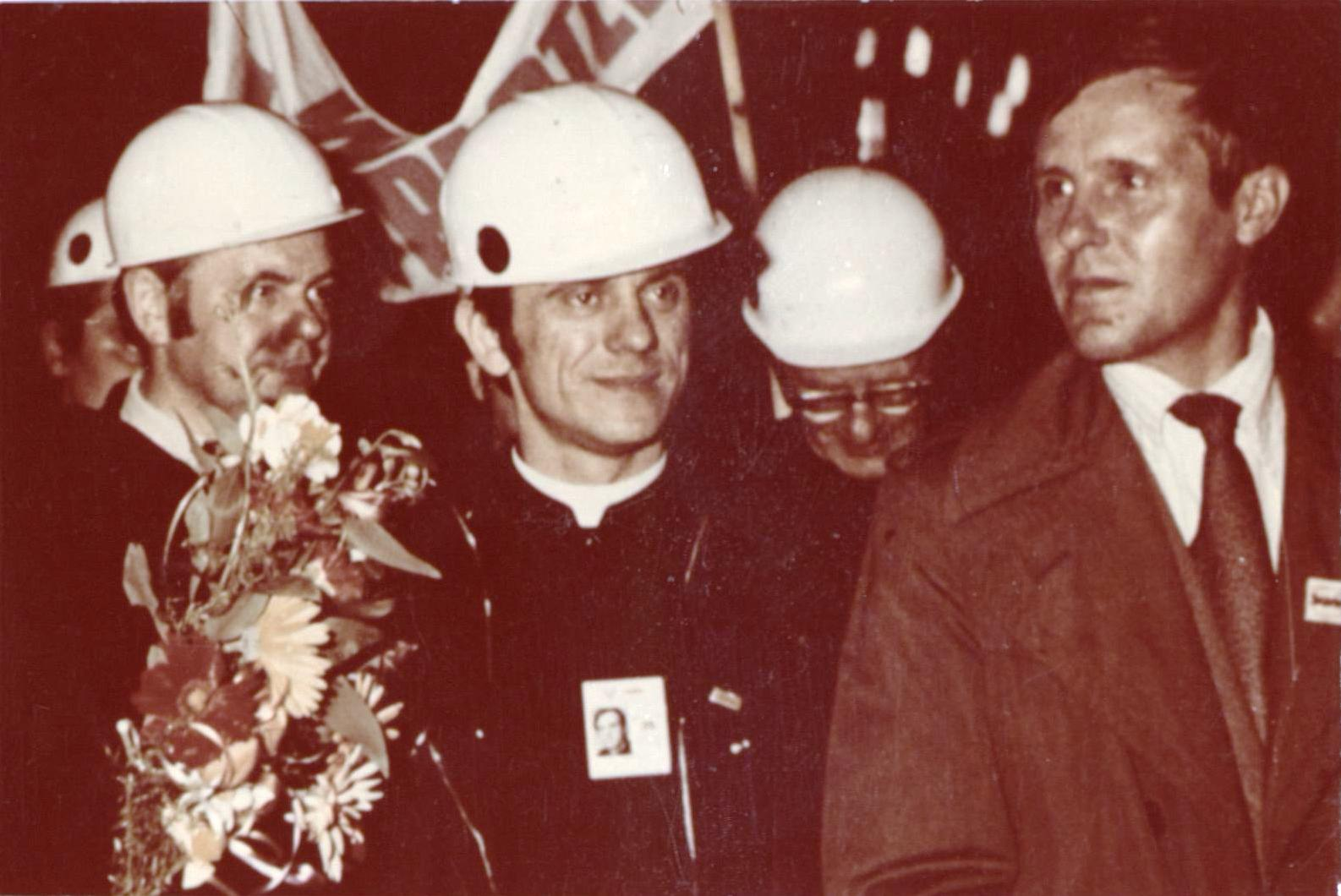
Popiełuszko meeting with workers at the Gdańsk Shipyard

Alfons was born on 14 September 1947 in Okopy, near Suchowola. After finishing school, he attended the priests' seminary at Warsaw. In 1966–1968, he served his army duties in a special force in Bartoszyce, aimed at keeping young men with religious vocations from entering the clergy. This treatment had no effect on Alfons's beliefs, as, after finishing his army service, he continued his studies; however, the repeated punishments for his resistance affected his health for the rest of his life. Alfons, with seminary superiors' permission, changed his name from Alfons to Jerzy because the word "alfons" was used to describe a person (especially a man) who deals with prostitution, giving it a negative connotation in Warsaw. Living in the multicultural Podlasie region, the Popiełuszko family is sometimes perceived today as Belarusian; it is pointed out that during the first years of his life, the future priest communicated in a Belarusian dialect referred to as simple language.

Popiełuszko was ordained a priest by Cardinal Stefan Wyszyński in May 1972. As a young priest he first served in Ząbki near Warsaw in 1972–1975. Afterwards, he served in parishes in Warsaw, which consisted of the common people as well as students. In 1981, Popiełuszko joined the workers, taking part with strikers in the Warsaw Steelworks. Thereafter he was associated with workers and trade unionists from the Solidarity movement who opposed the communist regime in Poland.

He was a staunch opponent of the communist regime and, in his sermons, interwove spiritual exhortations with political messages, criticizing the government, expressing solidarity with the interned and motivating people to protest. During the period of martial law, the Catholic Church was the only force that could voice protest comparatively openly, with the regular celebration of Mass presenting opportunities for public gatherings in churches.

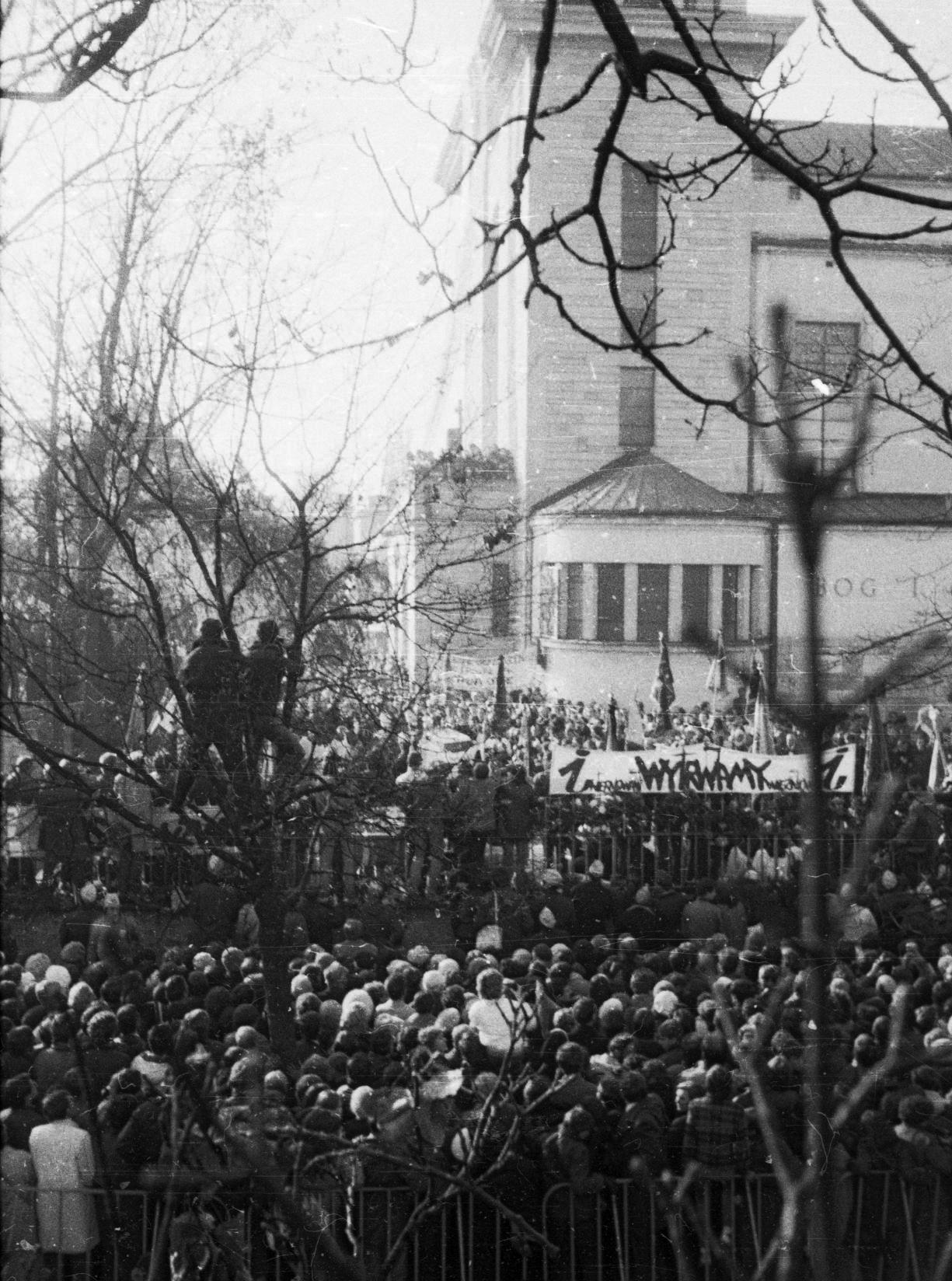
Funeral (1984)

Popiełuszko's sermons were routinely broadcast by Radio Free Europe, and thus became known throughout Poland for their uncompromising stance against the regime.

Popiełuszko had a dog named Tajniak, meaning "secret agent". It was run over by a ZSD Nysa.

=== Assassination ===
Invited by the Pastoral Care of the Working People (Polish: Duszpasterstwo Ludzi Pracy), Popiełuszko arrived in Bydgoszcz on 19 October 1984. At 18:00, he celebrated Holy Mass at the Church of the Holy Polish Brothers Martyrs. A car accident had been set up to kill Popiełuszko on 13 October 1984 but he evaded it. The alternative plan was to kidnap him; it was carried out on 19 October 1984. Popiełuszko was beaten to death by three Security Police officers: Captain Grzegorz Piotrowski, Leszek Pękala, and Waldemar Chmielewski. They pretended to have problems with their car and flagged down Popiełuszko's car for help. Popiełuszko was severely beaten, tied up and put in the trunk of the car. The officers bound a stone to his feet and dropped him into the Vistula Water Reservoir near Włocławek from where his body was recovered on 30 October 1984. A day after the discovery, President Ronald Reagan acknowledged that Polish people lamented as they were aware of Popiełuszko's passing. Reagan stated that Popiełuszko "was a champion of Christian values and a courageous spokesman for the cause of liberty."

News of the political murder caused an uproar throughout Poland, and the murderers and one of their superiors, Colonel Adam Pietruszka, were convicted of the crime. A huge crowd estimated to be between 600,000 to 1 million, including Lech Wałęsa, attended his funeral on 3 November 1984. The murder was widely used in political propaganda of the Polish opposition in the late 1980s. Popiełuszko's murderers – Captain Grzegorz Piotrowski, Leszek Pękala, Waldemar Chmielewski and Colonel Adam Pietruszka, responsible for giving the order to kill – received prison sentences.

Popiełuszko was posthumously awarded the Order of the White Eagle, Poland's highest decoration, in 2009. He is buried in St. Stanislaus Kostka Church, Warsaw, where millions of visitors paid tribute, including famous politicians like U.S. Vice President George Bush in September 1987.

== Funeral ==
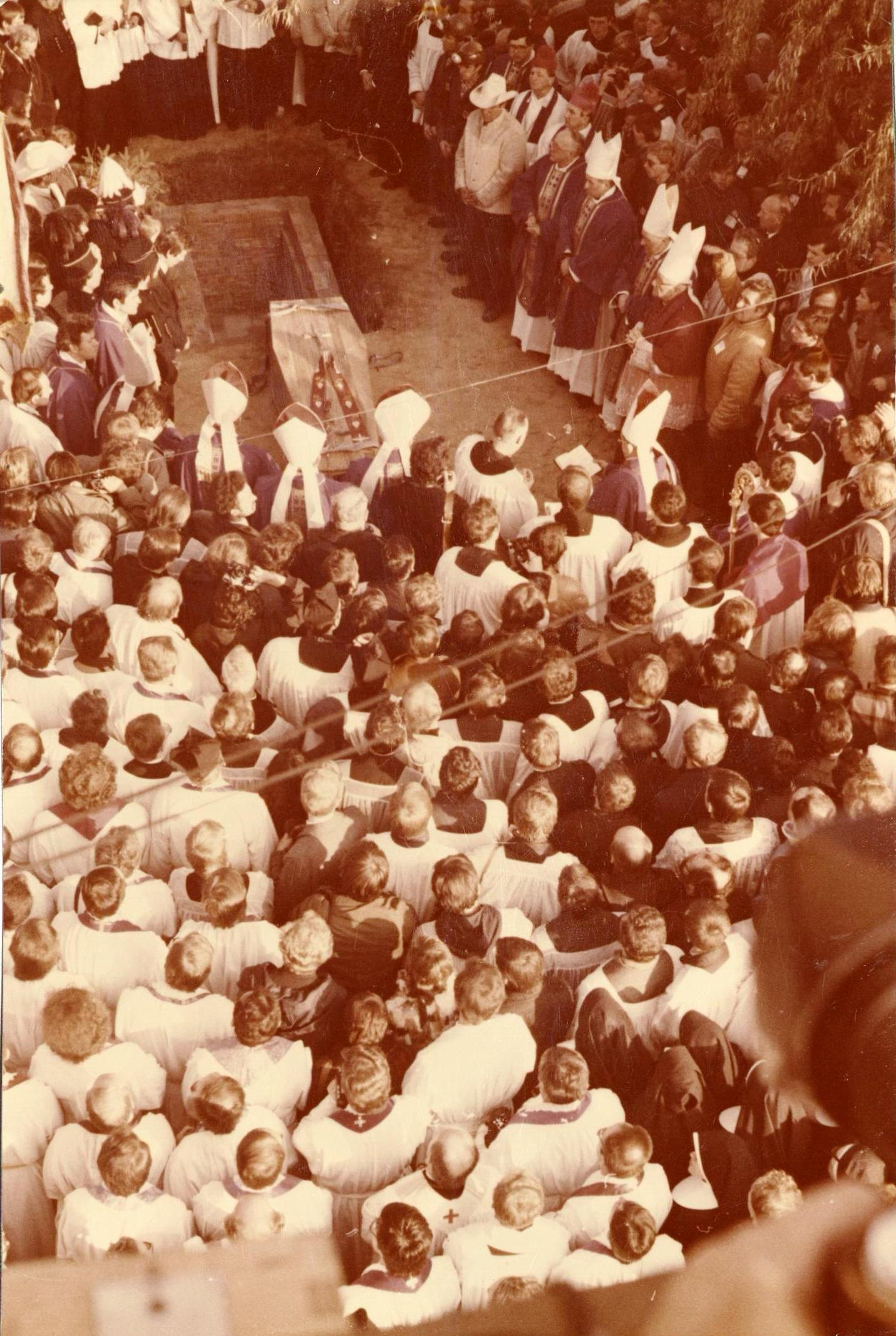
Coffin before burial

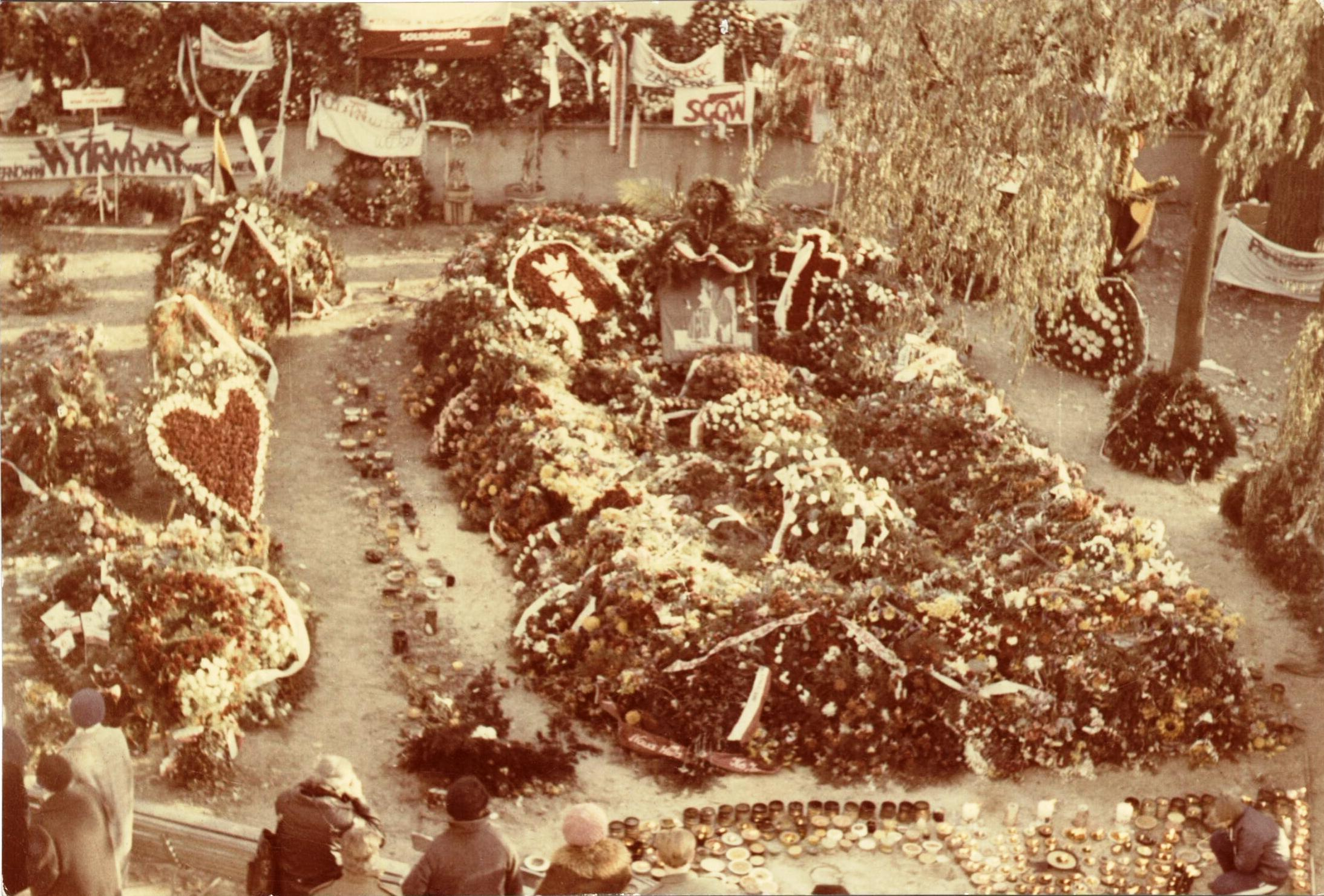
The grave on the day of the funeral

On Saturday, 3 November 1984, the funeral of a 37-year-old Catholic priest Jerzy Popiełuszko took place at St. Stanislaus Kostka Church, Żoliborz, Warsaw. The funeral, which attracted between 600,000 and a million people, became a large anti-communist demonstration. Data from the Security Service underestimated the number to 100,000. The Citizens' Militia initially reported a figure of only 10-14 thousand.

== Beatification ==
The Roman Catholic Church started the process of his beatification with the declaration of nihil obstat (nothing against) on 15 March 1996 and held a diocesan process from 8 February 1997 to 8 February 2001. This conferred upon him the title of Servant of God. The beatification portrait of Popiełuszko was painted by Zbigniew Kotyłło as he won a competition prior to Popiełuszko's beatification.

In October 1994, 10th anniversary after the death of Popiełuszko, during the private worship, extensive materials were handed over to cardinal Józef Glemp. Then, the Commission for the Preparation of the Beatification Process of Jerzy Popiełuszko was established and coined by Cardinal Józef, gathering all the documents related to Popiełuszko's life and martyrdom that include secular documents, manuscripts of Popiełuszko's homilies, his letters, recordings of his public appearances, and the files of the Toruń trial along with the prosecutor's files from the investigation against him.

On 3 May 2001, the beatification process began as proven by the Congregation for the Causes of Saints that his death was voluntary and simultaneous that he defended Catholic values. In 2006, 5 years later, Tomasz Kaczmarek, a postulator for the beatification, announced the completion of the work on the 1,157-page document that is titled "Position on Matyrdom," or positio, along with the detailed evidence that had to be gathered not only to prove Popiełuszko's death as a martyr, but also rather that he accepted death reconciled with Christ. However, the evidence required the opinions of clergy, psychologists, doctors, and others. Kaczmarek also stated that the date of Popiełuszko's death was speculated. The speculation not only resulted in thorough investigation but the beatification was not halted or Popiełuszko's death was declared a "martyr's death." Then two years later, the positio was submitted to the Congregation for the Causes of Saints and on 19 December 2009 it was announced that Pope Benedict XVI had approved the decree for the beatification of Popiełuszko.

=== Preparation ===
On 30 May 2010 in Warsaw, Polish bishops appealed for the beatification that would take place on 6 June that year. According to the pastoral letter that was read by bishops, the beatification ceremony would become a "great celebration for our homeland" and the bishops wrote that they "thank Divine Providence for [their] freedom and for those who led us towards it," as well as the strikes in Poland that lead to the foundation of the Solidarity in 1980, also known as the August Agreements. In addition to being thankful for Solidarity's foundation, Popiełuszko's mentor were also honored in the tribute that lead to the beatification, including Cardinal Stefan Wyszyński and Pope John Paul II, along with his quote on the 10th anniversary of Popiełuszko's death, quoted: "The priest-martyr will forever remain in the memory of our nation as a fearless defender of truth, justice, freedom and human dignity." The bishops gave were also thankful for the gift of life, vocation, and ministry of Popiełuszko. The August Agreements was recalled that one of the bishops was sent by Cardinal Stefan to celebrate the Holy Mass for striking steelworks in Warsaw. Then, the bishops also recalled the Holy Masses for the Homeland celebrated by Popiełuszko following the martial law imposition in Poland. According to the bishops, Popiełuszko's sermons were "calm and objective." Along with defending human dignity and the nation's, Popiełuszko "called for witness in a difficult and painful way," and he also was a "brother to everyone," wanted to be close to anyone, captivated with his simplicity and warmth while he simultaneously administered the holy sacraments and attended the trials of political prisoners, as well as organizing care for their families and helping them to overcome fear. Popiełuszko believed the word of Christ that knowing the truth will set anyone free. In addition to the truth setting anyone free, Popiełuszko also affirmed that one must live the truth in order to remain "a spiritually free person" and bear witness, which truth is unchangeable. The beatification formula was delivered in Latin by Archbishop Angelo, then it was read in Polish by Cardinal Kazimierz Nycz.

At the same day before the beatification of Father Jerzy, bishops read their pastoral letter. As bishops were reading the letter, the testimony of Father Jerzy emphasized that people in Poland need to unite while dealing with important issues, especially the persecution they received as Catholics, liberate themselves from hatred, and "overcome evil with good." The date of Father Jerzy's beatification had taken place on Thanksgiving Day. In addition to the beatification date, the bishops wrote that they were thankful for Divine Providence for their freedom and anything that leads to it, including the August Agreements in 1980 (which was the foundation of Solidarity), role models of Father Jerzy–Cardinal Stefan Wyszyński and Pope John Paul II–, vocation and ministry of Father Jerzy. On the 10th anniversary of Father Jerzy's death in 1994, bishops also quote the words of Pope John Paul II that Father Jerzy is declared a martyr of truth, justice, and freedom, and human dignity the latter defended. After the obligation of martial law in Poland, the bishops wrote and recalled the Masses for the homeland as these sermons are "calm and substantive" and are encouraged by Father Jerzy to defend human dignity and the "dignity of the nation, and above all, called for Christian witness in a difficult and painful reality."

=== Ceremony ===
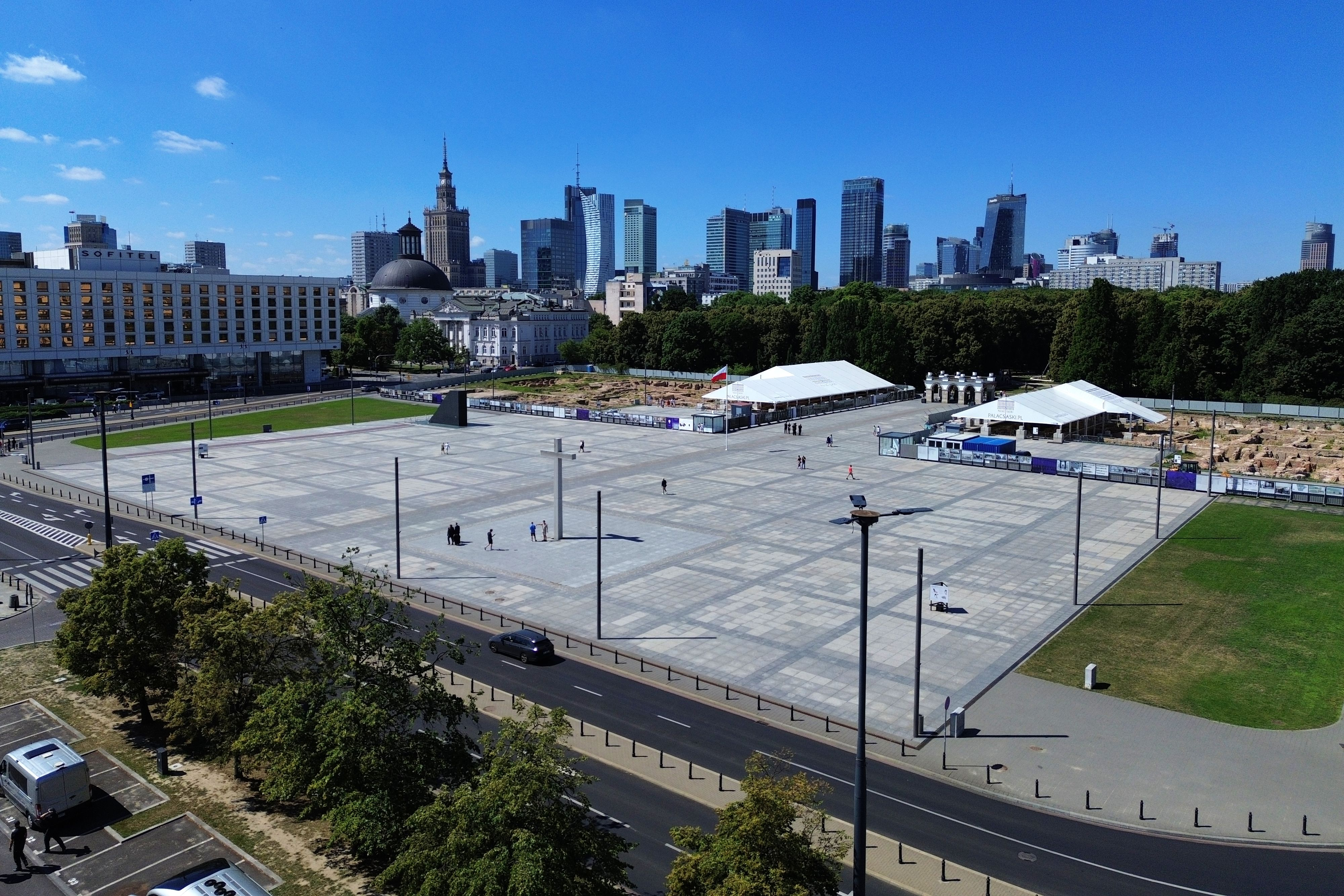
Piłsudski Square, where the beatification was taken place.

Seven days later that morning, roughly 150,000 people gathered at the Piłsudski Square, as well as accumulating 120 bishops, 1,300 priests, and Polish prime minister Donald Tusk and Jerzy Buzek. Pope Benedict XVI also was represented by the prefect of the Congregation for the Causes of Saints Angelo Amato. During the beatification ceremony, Archbishop Angelo signified that the message of Popiełuszko as a martyr is to "overcome evil with good," during the time when Popiełuszko and the Church faced persecutions, stating that Popiełuszko was faithful as he defended his dignity as a servant of Christ and the Church, demanded "freedom of conscience for the citizen and the priest," including truth, justice, and love, and suggested that "the tears of all Polish mothers would not be enough to soothe such pain and suffering" while addressing to his mother Marianna Popiełuszko. Popiełuszko was then beatified by Archbishop Angelo. His mother Marianna was present at the event.

More than 100,000 people attended the open-air Mass in the Polish capital Warsaw to beatify Popiełuszko, as it was concelebrated by the Prefect of the Congregation for the Causes of Saints, the Polish Episcopate, and international hierarchs including Cardinal William Levada, a prefect of the Congregation for the Doctrine of the Faith. In addition to cardinals present in the ceremony, 90-year-old Marianna Popiełuszko, mother of Father Jerzy, was also present for his beatification, prompting to tell the reporters that she felt "tears of joy".

Since Archbishop Angelo read Pope Benedict XVI's Apostolic Letter in Later, Archbishop Angelo also gave the homily as he spoke of Popiełuszko's courage and truth. Some suggest that Popiełuszko was a "dangerous criminal, but he was a priest who simply defended the Gospel. It was written that Father Jerzy was granted the title of Blessed by at the behest of Warsaw archbishop Kazimierz Nycz. The letter was followed by archbishop Nycz who then read it in Polish. Then archbishop Amato celebrated mass and gave the homily regarding Father Jerzy's courage and his dedication to the truth as he was treated harshly especially by secret agents. He also told those who gathered at the ceremony that the beatification is a "great gift for a great nation, whose book of holiness is enriched with another special page." While archbishop Amato was presiding over the ceremony, the principal relics of Father Jerzy were transferred to the Temple of Divine Providence, and they were resting in the Pantheon of Great Poles. Then, the relics were moved to the Chapel of Martyrdom, which was under construction at that time. The pilgrimage around the Piłsudski Square took 12 kilometers.

After Mass, Popiełuszko's relics were carried to the Temple of Divine Providence as it took 12 kilometers. Then, the relics were placed in the Pantheon of Great Poles. Poland Post issued a set of stamps on that same day to mark the beatification.

=== Reactions ===
Mariana attended her son's beatification as she suffered the tragedy of her son's death 26 years ago. Some sources claimed that Mariana celebrated her 100th birthday, although she was 90 at the time of the event. Over 100,000 faithful people in the Piłsudski Square were gathered, along with 100 cardinals and bishops, as well as nearly 3,000 priests from Poland and abroad.

58-year-old Anna Zwierzynski also told Agence France-Presse that Father Jerzy is a hero that he knew the risk to his life, but he did not fear death and refused to be silent.

== Canonization ==
In October 2013, Cardinal Kazimierz Nycz – the Archbishop of Warsaw, the diocese where Father Jerzy was killed – announced that a miracle attributed to the intercession of the Polish priest has been identified and confirmed in France. Cardinal Nycz predicted that Father Jerzy will likely be canonized soon, based on the credibility of the case presented.

=== François Audelan ===
Frenchmen Francis (François) Audelan became ill back in 2001. Feeling ill, Audelan was diagnosed with a cancer called chronic myeloid leukemia, resulting that Audelan would not likely to recover, although he was treated by the "best hematologists and world-renowned professors." Responding to the fact that Audelan had leukemia, his wife chose a coffin for her husband and planned funeral arrangements Audelan, who had three daughters, was then 56 years old when he suffered from leukemia for 11 years, which therefore neither chemotherapy nor a bone marrow transplant helped to cure it. Therefore, Audelan's health started to rapidly deteriorate and had a severe difficulty in walking in November 2011, causing him to be admitted to the Albert Chenevier Hospital in Créteil, France.

In 2012, Audelan, 56-year-old at the time, was unable to walk without assistance and eat. When doctors were unable to cure leukemia Audelan suffered from, a priest named Bernard Brien, whom he previously visited Popiełuszko's grave and an unwavering supporter of Popiełuszko, was summoned and invited to visit Audelan. Brien then administered the Sacrament to Audelan who fell ill. Following the visitation of Brien to Audelan, Audelan was miraculously healed of leukemia. Since there were no traces of leukemia being found, Audelan was discharged and returned home to his family. His full recovery was confirmed back in 7 December that year. In October 2013, Cardinal Kazimierz Nycz – the Archbishop of Warsaw, the diocese where Popiełuszko was killed – announced that a miracle attributed to the intercession of the Polish priest has been identified and confirmed in France. Thus Nycz predicts that Popiełuszko will likely be canonized soon, based on the credibility of the case presented.

On 14 September 2014 (Father Jerzy's posthumous 67th birthday), 66-year-old Father Bernard Brien stood by the beside Audelan, who was suffering from leukemia, a 58-year-old Frenchman, in Créteil hospital near Paris, France, which doctors did not give the latter a chance to live. However, a miracle happened as it was attributed to the intercession of Father Jerzy as the leukaemia went into remission. Therefore, the canonization of Father Jerzy would begin on Saturday, 20 September, in where the hospital took place.

A miracle was investigated in a diocesan process in France from 20 September 2014 until 14 September 2015 and the results of that investigation turned over to the Vatican for assessment.

Beginning the canonization process, the Tribunal members, including the priests from Poland–Father Józef Grzywaczewski and Father Józef Naumowicz–were formally admitted to the process. Gathered during the process, the original and two copies of 500-page documentation gathered was also presented. Regarding the document, it was sent to the Vatican's Congregation for the Cause of Saints by the Ordinary of the Diocese of Créteil.

=== Vatican review ===
The Polish newspaper Rzeczpospolita reported that the Vatican City had decided that the curing of leukemia was not a miracle event, so the efforts and proof of miracle "must begin again." After attempted canonization, Audelan died in November 2017 at 62.

== Associated people ==
=== Tomasz Kaczmarek ===
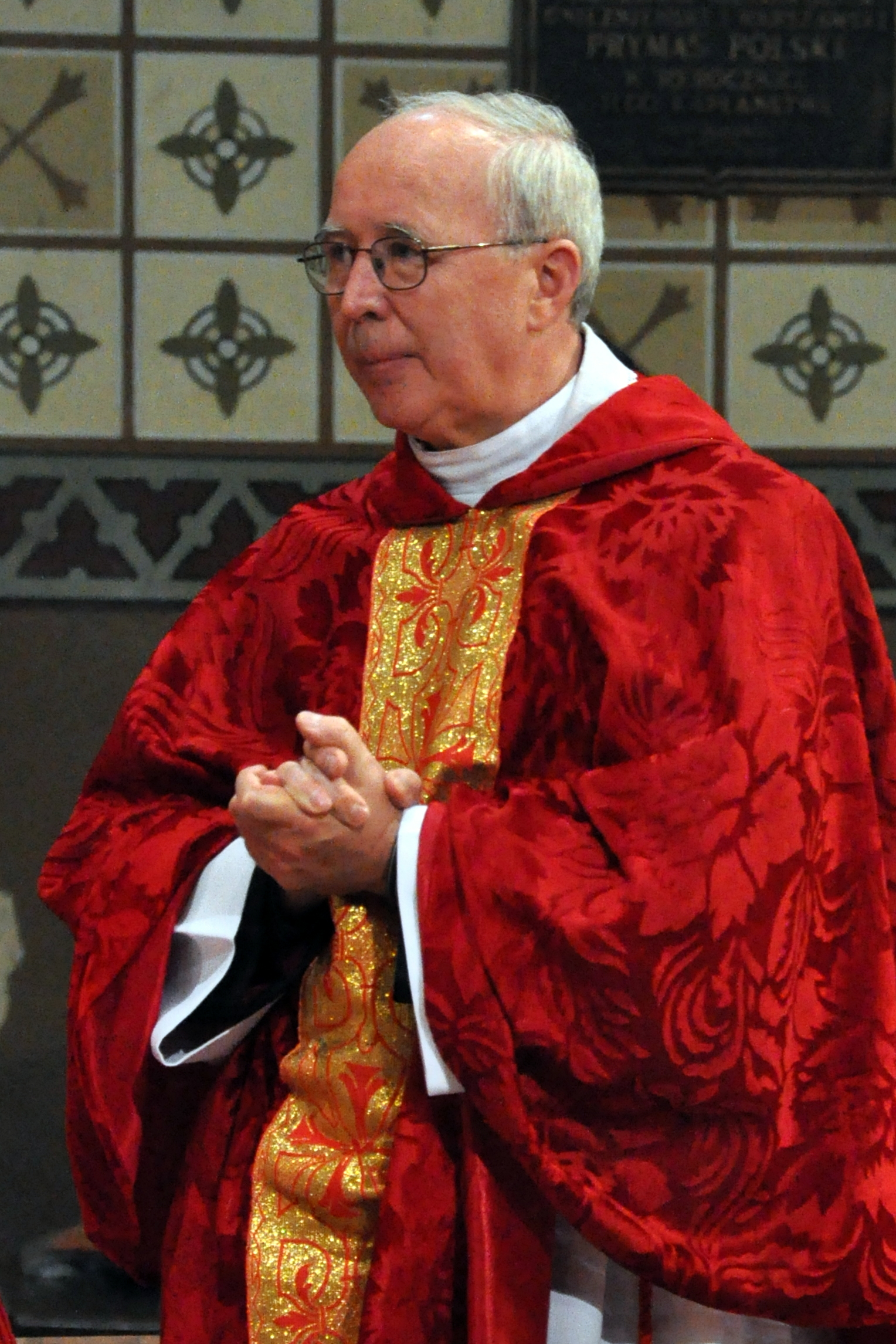
Portrait of Father Tomasz Kaczmarek in 2010.

In 2017, Father Tomasz Kaczmarek was a postulator for the beatification of Father Jerzy. However, Father Tomasz was revealed that he had collaborated with the Security Service, a secret agency in Polish People's Republic that assassinated Father Jerzy in 1984. Tygodnik Powszechny reported that Father Tomasz was recruited by the Security Service, as they "took advantage of [him] to study in Rome and began applying for a passport." The reservation for Father Tomasz to postulate the beatification of Father Jerzy was removed as the former had a full knowledge of collaborating with the Security Service by providing information that "could be detrimental to Church affairs," although Father Tomasz refused at first.

=== Zbigniew Kotyłło ===
Zbigniew Kotyłło, a painting artist in Lublin, is well known for the beatification portrait of Father Jerzy. Early life before the beatification process, Kotyłło won a national competition at the age of 16. In addition to the national competition he won, Kotyłło began his professional career at the Monument Conservation Studio in Lublin, as he was invited to Tallinn, which is the capital of Estonia. While several of his works were intended for beatification ceremonies, Koytłło won the competition hosted by the Warsaw Metropolitan Curia. Kotyłło also stated that he had gone to Father Jerzy's grave to pray.

=== Zbigniew Suchecki ===
Zbigniew Suchecki (born 16 August 1960 in Kamienna Góra) is a Polish Catholic priest, Franciscan, theologian, canonist, Doctor of Pontifical Lateran University and the Pontifical Faculty of St. Bonaventure in Rome, and the consultant of the Congregation for the Causes of Saints. He is also known for postulating the canonization process of Father Jerzy Popiełuszko.

== Legacy ==
Father Jerzy is remembered as an outspoken priest who was remembered as the "historical figures in the predominant Catholic nation's struggle against communism in Poland"; his preaching of freedom drew crowds under martial law in the 1980s. 58-year-old Anna Zwierzynski also told Agence France-Presse that Father Jerzy is a hero that he knew the risk to his life, but he did not fear death and refused to be silent.

=== Media ===
Noted Polish composer Andrzej Panufnik composed his Bassoon Concerto (1985) in memory of Popiełuszko. The work is inspired by Popiełuszko's work and death.

To Kill a Priest (1988) is a movie directed by Agnieszka Holland and starring Christopher Lambert as a character based on Popiełuszko.

A track entitled "Homily to Popiełuszko" is featured on the B-side to the album Flajelata (1986) by Muslimgauze. The entire B-side of that album is dedicated to all dissidents from the Soviet Union.

A transcript of the trial of Popiełuszko's murderers was used in producing a play, Ronald Harwood's documentary drama The Deliberate Death of a Polish Priest. It was premiered at the Almeida Theatre in October 1985.

A movie, Popieluszko: Freedom is Within Us, documenting the life and death of Popiełuszko, was released in Poland in February 2009. Another film, Jerzy Popieluszko: Messenger of the Truth, was produced by Paul G. Hensler in 2013.

In the television show The Americans, the episode "Duty and Honor" in season one featured a fictional Polish resistance leader loosely based on Popiełuszko.

In their work Manufacturing Consent, Edward S. Herman and Noam Chomsky used Popiełuszko's murder and subsequent media coverage in the United States as a case study of their "propaganda model", in which it is compared and contrasted with the coverage of murders of Óscar Romero and other Latin American clergy by US-backed forces.

=== Monuments ===
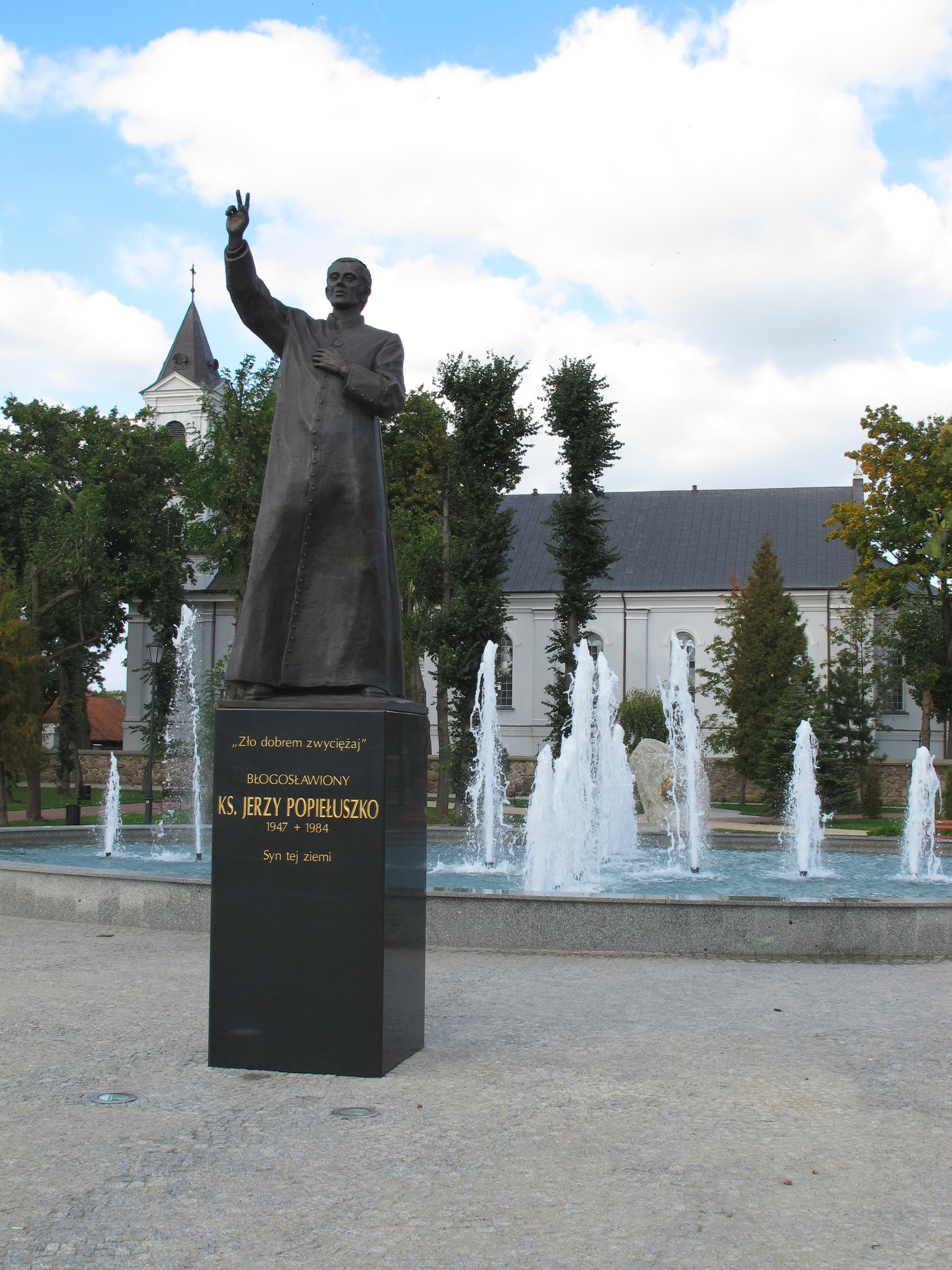
Monument in Suchowola

There are numerous monuments to Popiełuszko in Poland, including the towns of Suchowola, where he attended and graduated high school, Bartoszyce, where he served his army duties, and Ząbki, where he first served as a priest. The places of his kidnapping in Górsk and death in Włocławek are commemorated with monuments in the form of crosses. There is also a museum dedicated to him in Suchowola.

The first monument of Popiełuszko was created by Polish sculptor and dissident Marek Sobociński, and was unveiled in 1986 in Mariaholm near Askim, Norway.

A monument to Popiełuszko in the form of a symbolic gravestone in the shape of a cross was erected by Chicago's Polish community in the garden of memory next to St. Hyacinth Basilica.

A monument to Popiełuszko in the form of a bust bearing his likeness with a chain wrapped about his neck was erected on the property of Saint Hedwig Catholic Church in Trenton, New Jersey.

A pocket park across from McCarren Park on the Williamsburg-Greenpoint border in Brooklyn, New York, a historically Polish neighborhood, is named for Popiełuszko and features a stone bust bearing his likeness.

Popieluszko Court in Hartford, Connecticut, was named in his memory. The SS. Cyril & Methodius Church is located on this street, serving as an important cornerstone for the area's Catholic Polish-American community. The street intersects with Charter Oak Boulevard, with the main entrance to the parking lot of the Polish National Home of Hartford across the street at the end of Popieluszko Court.

A two-part monument has been installed in New Britain's Walnut Hill Park consisting of an inscribed stone plaque near an abstract sculpture of an eternal flame.

The stone is inscribed with the Polish Title Zło Dobrem Zwyciężaj: "This human rights monument of common fieldstone and steel is built in memory of Father Jerzy Popieluszko who gave his life to God and to the goals of Solidarność – human rights, justice, peace and freedom for Poland and for all mankind. May this eternal flame of liberty and the memory of his courage and sacrifice burn forever in the hearts of all freedom-loving people. 1947 Good shall vanquish evil 1984"

The abstract sculpture of the eternal flame was created by Henry Chotkowski and dedicated on 16 June 1989. An aluminum plaque on the stone wall surrounding the sculpture explains the significance of the sculpture.

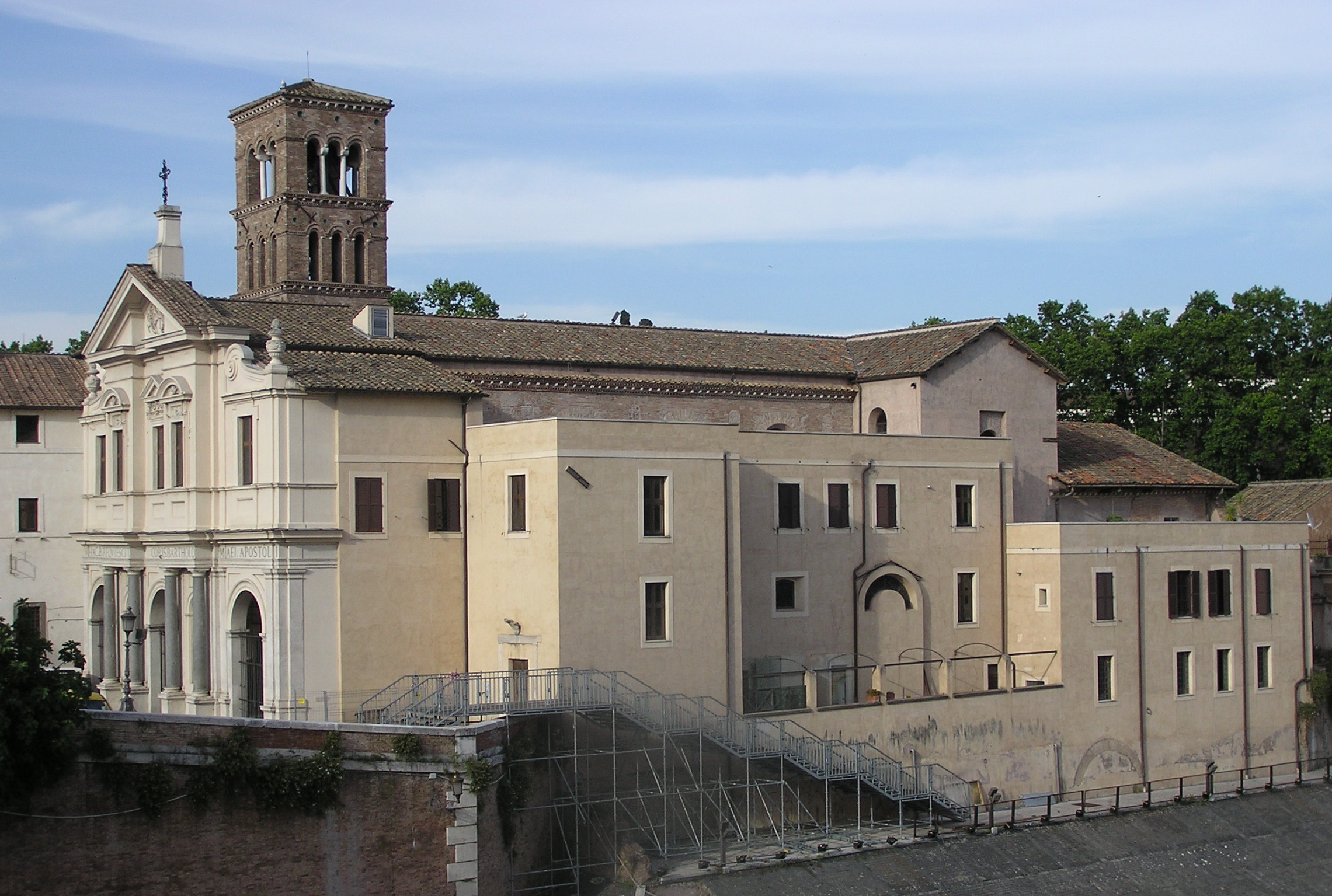
San Bartolomeo all'Isola in Rome, where Popiełuszko is commemorated in the memorial to 20th- and 21st- century martyrs.

The rock that was used to kill Popiełuszko was placed in the San Bartolomeo all'Isola in Rome as a relic of a 20th-century martyr, part of the memorial to 20th– and 21st–century martyrs.

There are two monuments commemorating Popiełuszko in Budapest, Hungary. In 2017, a monument containing Popiełuszko's motto "Overcome evil with good" written in Polish and in Hungarian was unveiled in the Csepel district of the Hungarian capital. In Csepel, there is also a street named after Popiełuszko and a belfry in his honor. Meanwhile, in 2016 in the Óbuda-Békásmegyer district of Budapest there is a square named after Popiełuszko and a monument consisting of stones that make up a rosary featuring quotes from him.

There is also a monument in the French city of Béziers.

==== Beautification portrait of Father Jerzy ====
Since Kotyłło won the competition, the beatification portrait of Father Jerzy is 210 x 145 cm and was admitted by Kotyłło to be the "best canvas, primer, and [of all] paints." The portrait of Father Jerzy is presented in "American frame," showing a depicted priest whose frame is from slightly above the knees to the top of his head. In addition to the appearance of Father Jerzy, the photos of Father Jerzy were used for painting.

=== Tomb ===
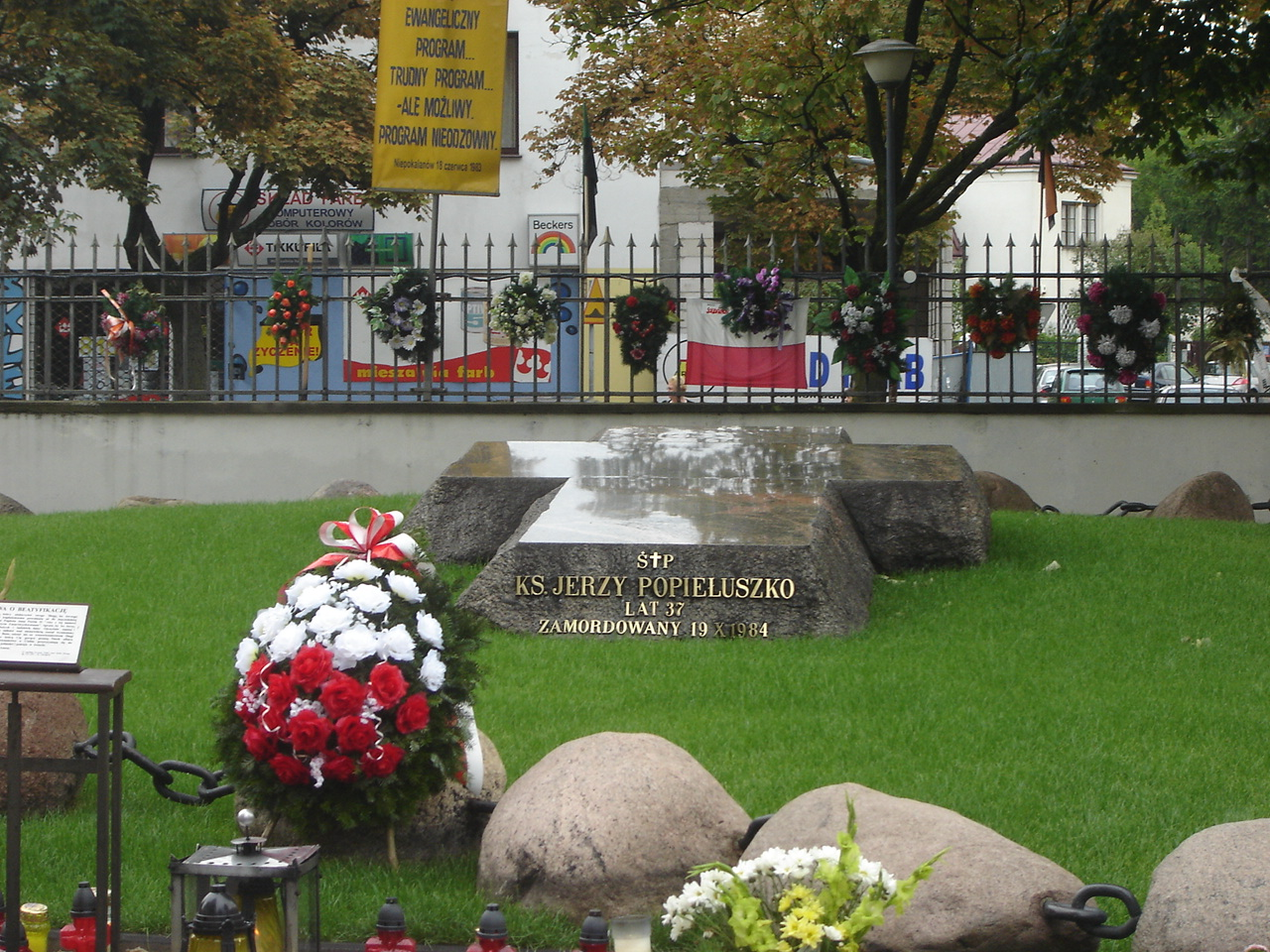
Tomb of Blessed Father Jerzy Popiełuszko

The tomb of Popiełuszko was designed by Jerzy Kalina, located in Warsaw. Popiełuszko was to be buried in the Powązki Cemetery. However, the parish priest of St. Stanislaus Kostka Church, Warsaw, Fr. Teofil Bogucki, the faithful and numerous friends of the murdered chaplain asked Primate Józef Glemp to bury Popiełuszko in the church. It is located in the grounds of St. Stanislaus Kostka Church at 2 Stanisław Hozjusz Street in the Żoliborz district of Warsaw. The tomb is located under a large tree, near the eastern corner of the fenced-in area of the church.

The tomb has the shape of a burial mound with a cross-shaped granite slab on top. In the immediate vicinity of the grave, on one of the trees, there is a crucifix created by Gustaw Zemła. The grave is surrounded by a rosary of cobblestones arranged in the shape of Polish borders. The link is in the form of a crowned eagle with Our Lady of Częstochowa on its breast.

The memorial grave was built in 1986 on the site of a wooden cross. The cross was already surrounded by a rosary of fieldstones arranged in the shape of Poland's borders. Since 1984 the shrine and the tomb of the priest became a place of pilgrimage. On 14 June 1987, Pope John Paul II visited the church. On 19 October 2004, on the occasion of the 20th anniversary of Popiełuszko's death, a solemn mass was held in St. Stanislaw Kostka, attended by more than 20,000 faithful. At the same time, a museum dedicated to Popiełuszko was opened in the basement of the church.

In April 2010, Popiełuszko's relics were exhumed and canonically discerned (this was a requirement of canon law). The grave was then renovated, and the body of the martyr was placed in the same place in a new coffin. It is estimated that till 2009 the site was visited by about 18 million people. Among those who prayed at the tomb were:

- Pope John Paul II
- Cardinal Joseph Ratzinger (Pope Benedict XVI)
- Cardinal Karl Lehmann, president of the German Bishops' Conference
- Cardinal Jean-Marie Lustiger, archbishop of Paris
- Cardinal Christoph Schönborn, archbishop of Vienna, president of the Austrian Episcopal Conference
- Cardinal William Joseph Levada, prefect of the Congregation for the Doctrine of the Faith
- President of the Czech Republic Václav Havel
- President of Georgia Mikheil Saakashvili
- President of the United States George W. Bush
- Prime Minister of the United Kingdom Margaret Thatcher
- Prime Minister of Italy Giulio Andreotti
- Prime Minister of Hungary Viktor Orbán
- President of the European Parliament Hans-Gert Poettering

=== Feast day and patronage ===
On 19 October 2010 until 2014, Cardinal Kazimierz declared Father Jerzy as a patron of Solidarity and designated the following days as days on which a plenary indulgence may be obtained:

- Name Day of Blessed Father Jerzy – 23 April;
- The anniversary of the beatification ceremony – 6 June;
- Liturgical memorial of Blessed Jerzy Popiełuszko – 19 October.

=== Holy Masses ===
Marking the 15th anniversary of the beatification in 2025, the Holy Masses for the Homeland were held on the last Sunday of the month, the Archdiocese of Warsaw announced.

== See also ==
- 1981 warning strike in Poland
- Church of the Holy Polish Brothers Martyrs
- Solidarity, a Polish trade union founded in Lenin Shipyard (now Gdańsk Shipyard) in August 1980.
- To Kill a Priest, a 1988 film that features a character based on the priest.
