= Zbigniew Suchecki (Franciscan) =

Polish priest (born 1960)

- Born: 16 August 1960 (age 65); Kamienna Góra
- Occupation: Franciscan priest
- Known for: postulator for Father Jerzy Popiełuszko canonization
- Religion: Catholic Church
- Church: Latin Church
- Ordained: 1986

Zbigniew Suchecki (born 16 August 1960 in Kamienna Góra) is a Polish Catholic priest, Franciscan, theologian, canonist, Doctor of Pontifical Lateran University and the Pontifical Faculty of St. Bonaventure in Rome, and the consultant of the Congregation for the Causes of Saints. He is also known for postulating the canonization process of Father Jerzy Popiełuszko.

== Biography ==
In 1979, Suchecki joined the Kraków Province of the Franciscan Order, then he took his solemn vows. As he took his vows, Suchecki was ordained a priest in 1986, then he studied canon law at the Pontifical Lateran University in Rome, earning the title Doctorate in both laws–“utroque jure”–as he completed his postdoctoral degree at the Stefan Wyszyński Catholic University in Warsaw. Completing his postdoctoral degree, Suchecki was lecturing for the Pontifical Theological Faculty of St. Bonaventure and the Pontifical University Antonianum in Rome. Then Father Suchecki postulated the beatification and canonization process of Cardinal Stefan Wyszyński, who was the Servant of God at that time. Suchecki also specialized in criminal and constitutional law, as well as a member of the Parish of the Sacred Heart of Jesus in Kamienna Góra. He currently resides in Rome.

== Publications ==
=== Books ===
- La cremazione dei cadaveri nel Diritto Canonico, Roma 1990.
- La cremazione nel Diritto Canonico e Civile, ed. Libreria Editrice Vaticana, Roma 1995, ss. 300.
- Positio super martyrio Mariae Stellae (in saeculo: Adelaide Mardosewicz et 10 Sociarium, Sororum professarum ex instituto Sacrae Familiare de Nazareth in odium fidei, uti fertur, interfectarum († 1 agosto 1943), Roma 1996.
- La Massoneria nelle disposizioni del “Codex Iuris Canonici” del 1917 e del 1983, ed. Libreria Editrice Vaticana, Roma 1997.
- Le sanzioni Penali nella Chiesa: Parte I, I delitti e le sanzioni penali in genere (cann. 1311-1363), ed. Libreria Editrice Vaticana, Roma 1999.
- Il processo penale canonico, (a cura di Zbigniew Suchecki), Milano 2000.
- Chiesa e massoneria: Congregazione Plenaria della Pontificia Commissione per la Revisione del Codice di Diritto Canonico tenuta nei giorni 20-29 ottobre 1981 riguardante quinta questione speciale dedicata alla riassunzione del can. 2335 del Codice di Diritto Canonico 1917, ed. Libreria Editrice Vaticana, Roma 2000.
- Kościół a masoneria, Kraków 2002.
- Il processo penale canonico, (a cura di Zbigniew Suchecki), Roma 2003.
- Kościół a masoneria, Kraków 2009.
- Kremacja w kulturach świata, Kraków 2009.
- Le privazioni e le proibizioni nel Codice di Diritto Canonico del 1983, Roma 2010.

=== Scientific articles ===
- Zagadnienie kremacji w rozwoju historycznym, in Prawo Kanoniczne, 36 (1993), n. 1-2, pp. 145–159.
- Masoneria w dokumentach Stolicy Apostolskiej i Kodeksie Prawa Kanonicznego, ze szczególnym uwzględnieniem dekretów Kongregacji Doktryny Wiary (1949-1983), in W nurcie franciszkańskim, 7 (1998) pp. 157–173.
- Wolnomularstwo w dokumentach Stolicy Apostolskiej i Kodeksie Prawa Kanonicznego, ze szczególnym uwzględnieniem dekretów Kongregacji Doktryny Wiary (1949-1983), in Prawo kanoniczne 41 (1998) nr 3-4, pp. 167–220.
- Przestępstwa przeciwko szóstemu przykazaniu dekalogu z uwzględnieniem ustaw partykularnych Konferencji Episkopatu USA, w: Powołanie franciszkańskie: przeżywanie charyzmatu w XXI wieku (red. Z. Kijas) Kraków 2003, pp. 37–65.
- Rola promotora sprawiedliwości w procesie karnym. (Ruolo del promotore di giustizia nel processo penale) in Semel Deo dedicatum non est ad usum humanos ulterius transferendum. Księga pamiątkowa dedykowana ks. prof. dr. hab. Julianowi Kałowskiemu MIC z okazji siedemdziesiątej rocznicy urodzin (red. J. Wroceński, B. Szewczul, A. Orczykowski) Warszawa 2004, pp. 551–579.
- Promotor sprawiedliwości i jego udział w sprawach karnych, in Roczniki Nauk Prawnych, 14 (2004) n. 2, pp. 191–225.
- Męczeństwo jako wyraz heroicznej miłości w świetle aktualnej dyskusji teologicznej i praktyki Kongregacji ds. Kanonizacyjnych, w: AA.VV., Misterium miłości, (red. W. Irek, G. Sokołowski, A. Tomko) Wrocław 2010, pp. 86–110.
- Problematyka masonerii współczesnej, in: Rycerz Niepokalanej, 1 (1999) pp. 39–41.

== Bibliography ==
- Fr. Stanisław Książek, Fifty Years in the Service of the Altar (Pięćdziesiąt lat w służbie ołtarza), Kamienna Góra 2004.
