= Funeral of Jerzy Popiełuszko =

1984 funeral service at Żoliborz, Warsaw

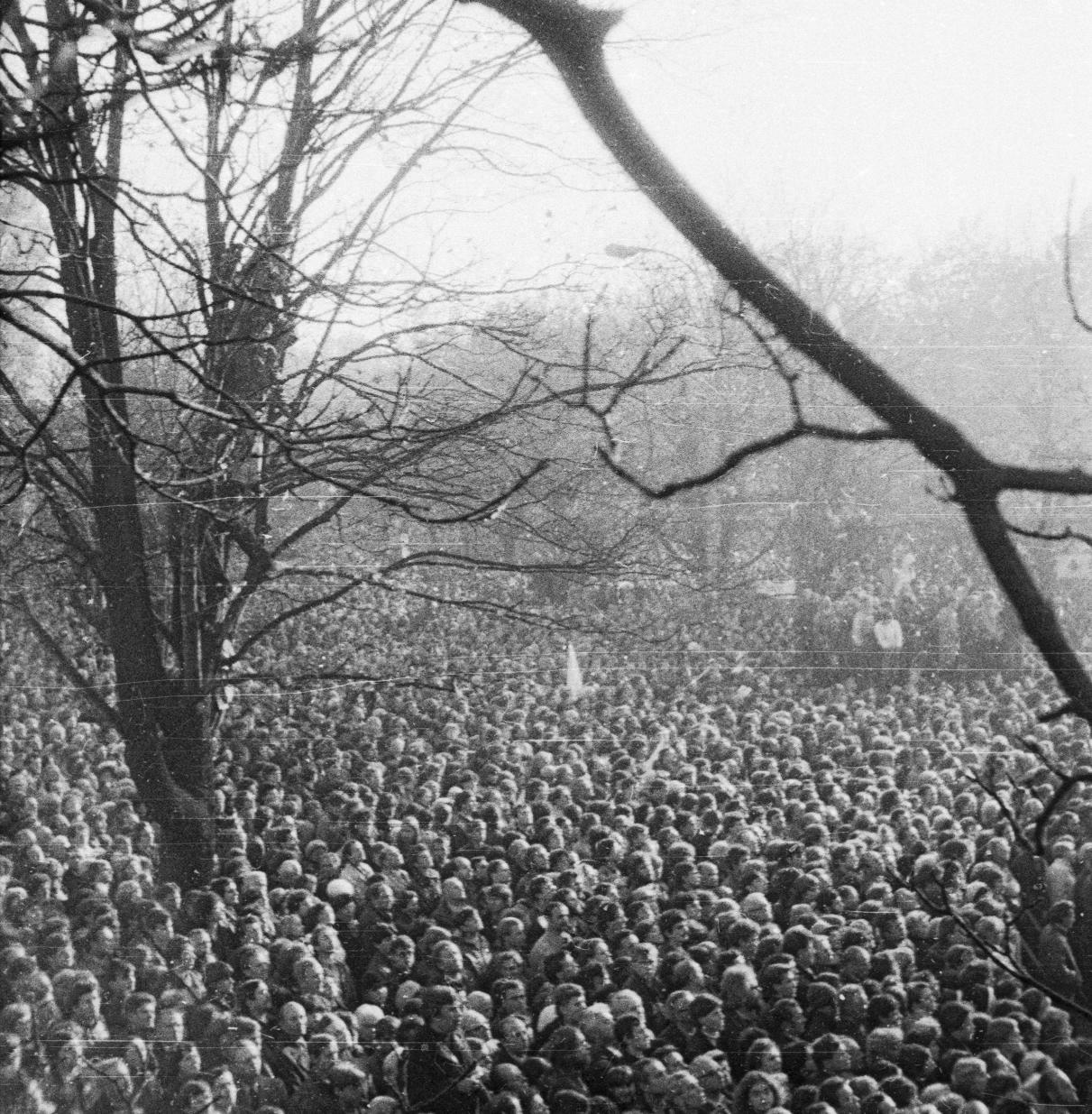
- Crowd in front of St. Stanislaus Kostka Church
- Date: 3 November 1984
- Venue: St. Stanislaus Kostka Church
- Location: Warsaw, Poland
- Type: Funeral
- Participants: 600,000-1 million

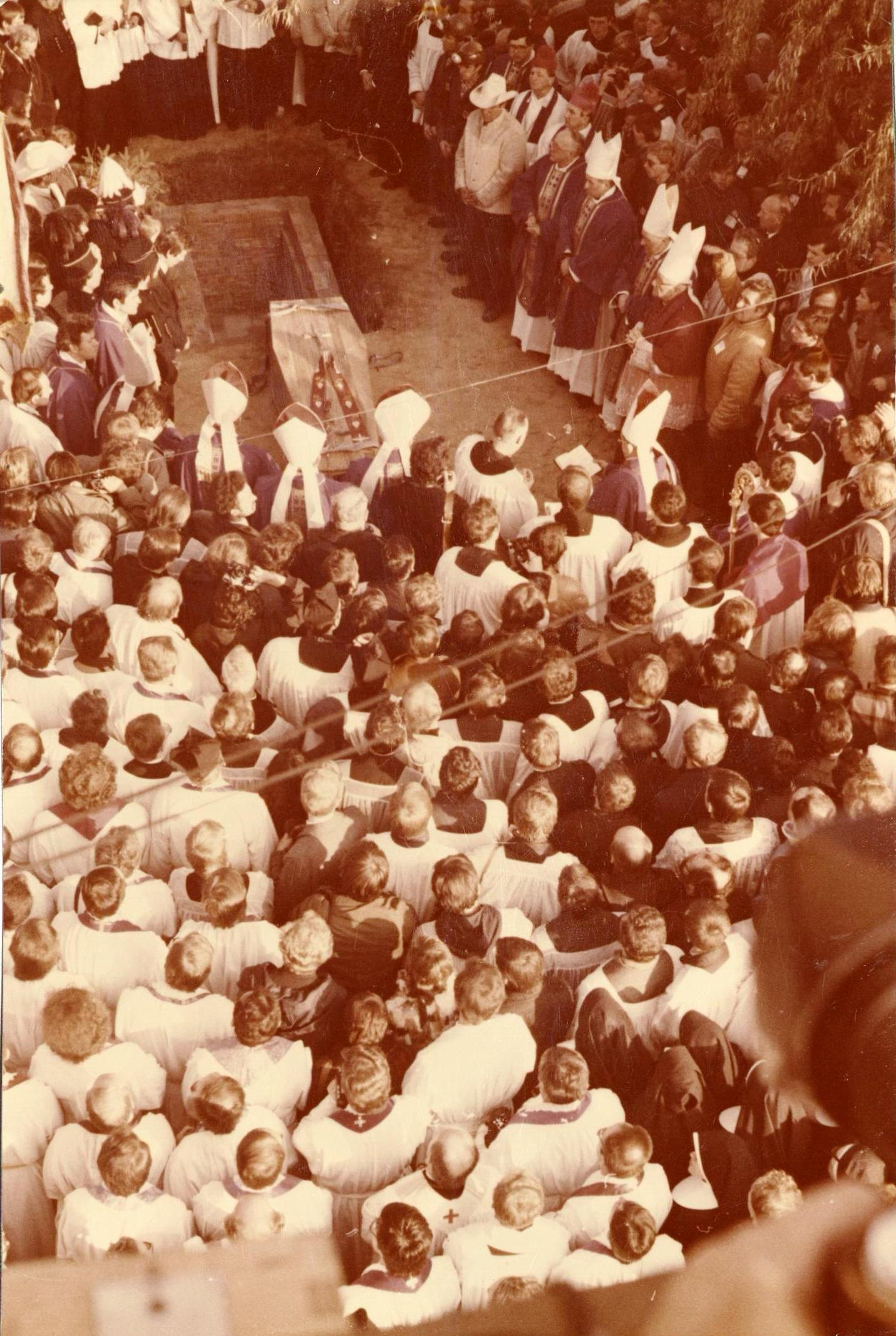
Coffin before burial

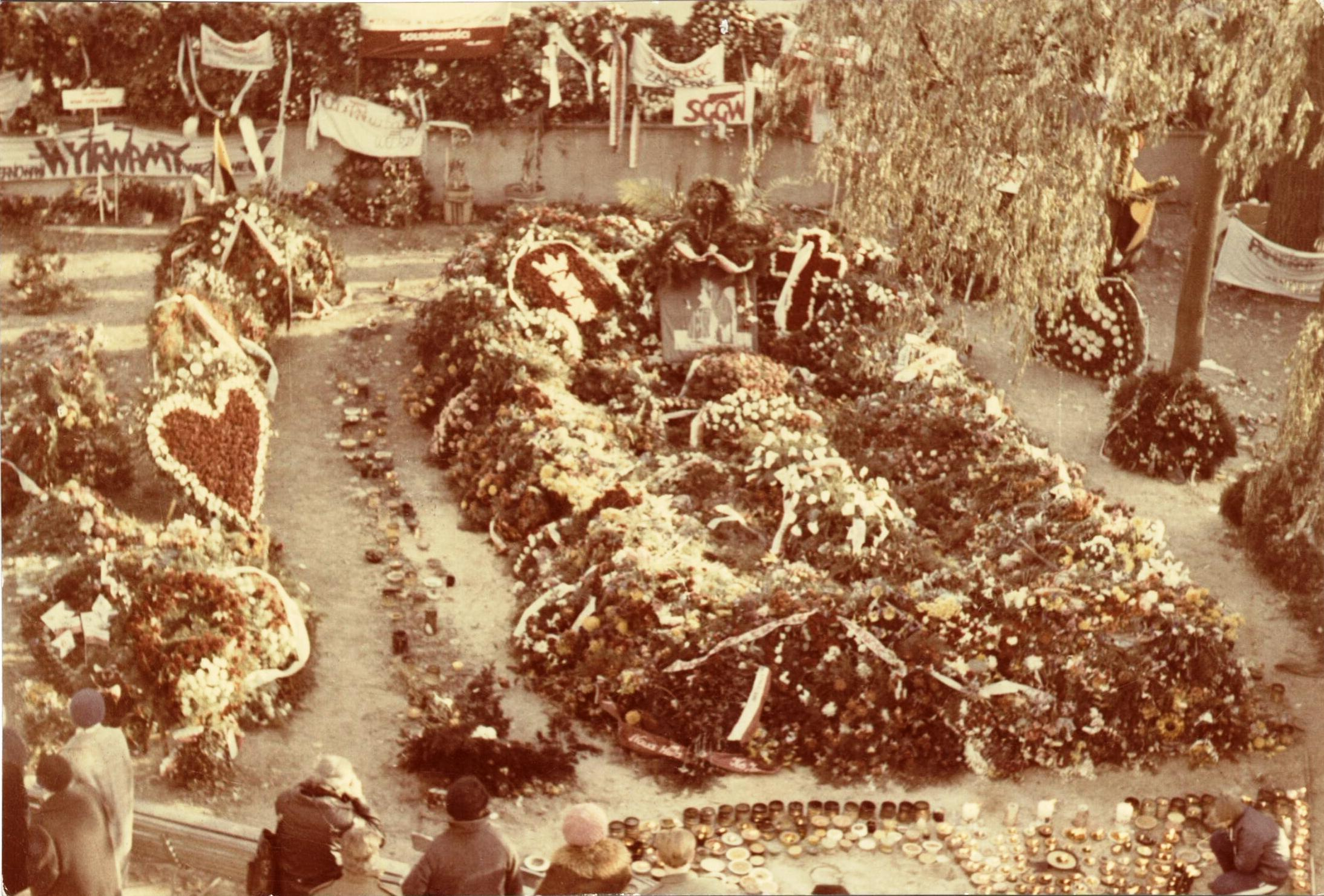
The grave on the day of the funeral

On Saturday, 3 November 1984, the funeral of a 37-year-old Catholic priest Jerzy Popiełuszko took place at St. Stanislaus Kostka Church, Żoliborz, Warsaw. The funeral, which attracted between 600,000 and a million people, became a large anti-communist demonstration. Data from the Security Service underestimated the number to 100,000. The Citizens' Militia initially reported a figure of only 10-14 thousand.

== Background ==
From April 1982, Father Jerzy was subjected to numerous acts of harassment, as he was “under active surveillance” by the Security Service. Several unsuccessful attempts were made to murder him. Finally, on 19 October Security Service officers kidnapped the priest and, after torturing him repeatedly, murdered him. On 30 October 1984, his body was recovered from the Vistula River near Włocławek, from where it was secretly transported to the Institute of Forensic Medicine in Białystok on the night of 30–31 October. The doctors who wrote the examination report stated: "The body is wrapped in a plastic bag tied in a cross, the ends of the rope are tied with a knot secured with a seal. The body is dressed in black trousers covered with dirt, and a black cassock rolled up to the waist. A jute bag containing stones is tied to both legs. It is tied in such a way that a white plastic cord twisted from several fibers is tied to both legs in such a way that the ends of the cord run along the back to the neck."

The news of the discovery of Fr. Jerzy's body was first announced to the faithful on 30 October after evening Mass at St. Stanislaus Kostka Church by Fr. Jerzy Przekaziński. He said: “Dear brothers and sisters, today, a priest was found in the waters of the reservoir in Włocławek...” He did not finish. The church erupted in loud crying, moaning, screaming, and sobbing, and people fell to their knees. It was impossible to intone the hymn "Któryś za nas cierpiał rany" (“You who suffered wounds for us”).

Father Antoni Lewek and Father Feliks Folejewski tried to calm the crowd, with Father Folejewski saying: "Brother Jerzy, who stands before God, who stands before God and the Immaculate Mother, whom you loved, and therefore you died not of old age, but of love, which means you live, because love never ends (...) through your intercession, martyr of truth and love... beloved, do we realize the significance of this event. (...) Fruit! Dear people! If we live, it is a seed sown in the ground. This is a blessing, because the foolish thought that he had died."

Those gathered in the church were asked to recite three times: “...And forgive us our trespasses, as we forgive those who trespass against us.”

== Preparations for the funeral ==
=== Białystok ===
On 2 November 1984, around noon, Fr. Cezary Potocki, chancellor of the Bishop's Curia in Białystok, asked the superior of the Grey Sisters, Barbara Lisowska, for three sisters who would participate as witnesses in dressing the body of the murdered Fr. Jerzy for the coffin. The body was identified by his brother. A cross with a passion and a rosary, which he had received from John Paul II, were placed in his hand, as well as three stamps: one with the image of Our Lady of Częstochowa against a white and red flag, one with the inscription "Solidarity" against an eagle, and one with the image of the Church of St. Stanislaus Kostka. A wooden cross was placed on the red chasuble, and his hands were tied with a white rosary. Sister Barbara Lisowska, a participant in the events, recalled:

"The dressed murdered priest was taken to another room, where priests from the cathedral parish were waiting with Father Antoni Lićwinka, the parish priest. There, the body was placed in a double coffin, wooden and metal, and transported to the chapel for a final farewell by the priest's immediate family and parents. The priest's parents, siblings, relatives, Bishop Edward Kisiel, and priests were present in the chapel. I remember most vividly the behavior and attitude of Maria Popiełuszko, Fr. Jerzy's mother. Looking at her, I imagined the Mother of God receiving the Body of her tortured Son Jesus. After a short funeral service, the coffin was closed and sealed. The priests took it on their shoulders and headed for the exit. However, as soon as the exit door was opened, the people instantly took the coffin and carried it high in their hands. Lit candles and scattered flowers formed an exit aisle. Białystok taxi drivers accompanied Father Jerzy with their horns blaring. There was no end to the taxis. The horns resounded throughout Białystok and the surrounding area. All the residents of Białystok learned the truth. Sharing our experiences in the community, we expressed our conviction that Father Jerzy Popiełuszko is a martyr and that we should not pray for him, but to him.

=== Warsaw ===
The communist authorities insisted that he be buried in his home parish, Suchowola, near Dąbrowa Białostocka. The idea of burying the priest at the Powązki Military Cemetery was raised. The future burial site had even been inspected by Cardinal Glemp. Under pressure from people praying, after meeting with Father Jerzy's mother, Marianna Popiełuszko, the primate changed his mind and finally designated the square next to St. Stanislaus Kostka Church as the burial site.

Preparations for the funeral began on the night of second day of November. Confessionals were set up on the lawn in front of the church, where queues formed for confession. A separate queue led inside the church, where the crowd pressed forward to pause for a moment in front of the coffin.

At around 5 a.m., the people were asked to leave, and the coffin was opened to be sealed. Only three steelworkers and Fr. Popiełuszko's parents and siblings were present at the mutilated body. At dawn, the oak coffin was carried out in front of the church. It was covered with a white and red flag, on which lay a chalice and a red stole.

== Funeral ceremonies ==
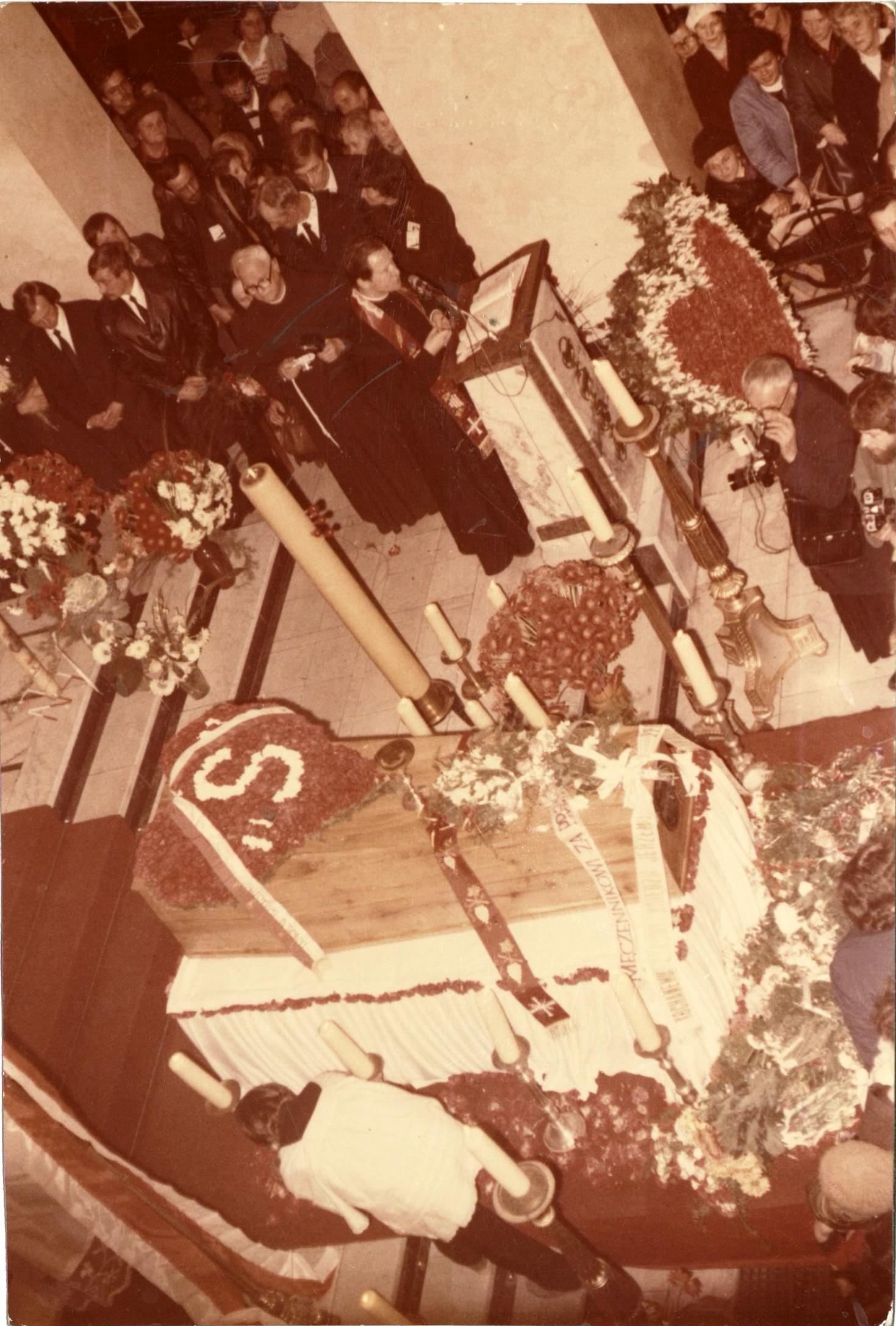
Coffin

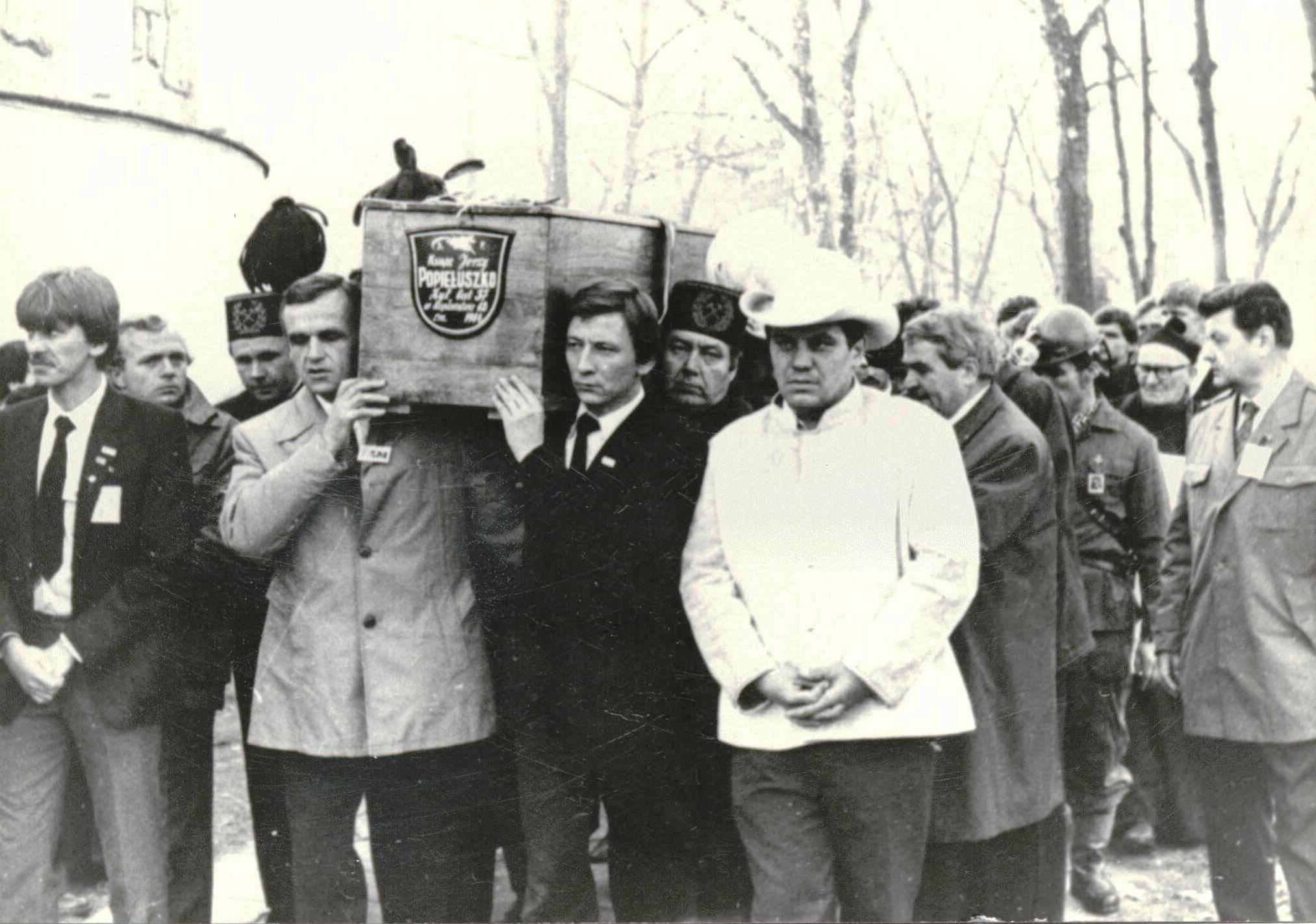
Transferring the coffin to the grave. In the front row, the coffin is carried by the driver, Waldemar Chrostowski.

According to the Citizens' Militia, between 10,000 and 100,000 people attended the funeral. This number was deliberately underestimated to downplay the true scale of the event. According to various sources, between half a million and a million people attended the funeral. The crowd filled not only the church square, but also all the surrounding streets and alleys, including the large Paris Commune Square (now Wilson Square).

The ceremony was attended by the Primate of Poland, Józef Glemp, and the funeral mass was concelebrated by twelve priests at the altar, but several hundred priests were present. The sermon was delivered by Cardinal Glemp. In it, he stated: "We forgive all wrongdoers who have harmed their neighbors out of conviction or on command. We forgive the killers of Father Popiełuszko. We have no hatred toward anyone. Perhaps a sacrifice of life was needed to uncover the hidden mechanisms of evil, to allow the desires for good, sincerity, and trust to be unleashed more strongly.

During the mass, the following also spoke:

- Father Ryszard Rumianek, the vice-rector of the Warsaw Metropolitan Seminary, who stated: "He is leaving as a national hero, entering our history."
- Engineer Karol Szadurski, a representative of ArcelorMittal Warsaw, who stated: "...Father Jerzy heard the bells of freedom ringing, he heard our hearts praying..." Your Ark of Solidarity of hearts sails on with us, leading more and more of us. May God welcome you into the ranks of Polish martyrs for the Fatherland. You suffered for her – you have already conquered in Christ...
- Marian Jabłoński, a doctor who worked in the healthcare ministry led by Father Popiełuszko, stated: "...you reminded us of the Hippocratic Oath that is trampled upon today [...], you emphasized that disrespect for life violates a fundamental natural law, universally binding and categorically 'Thou shalt not kill'." (...) Can we therefore vow once more that we will do everything in our power to ensure that Polish soil is not stained with the blood of our brothers? Noble Poles, will you have the courage to swear..."
- Elżbieta Morawska, a nurse, emphasized the significant role of Father Popiełuszko in pastoral work within the nursing community.
- Father Teofil Bogucki, the parish priest of St. Stanislaus Kostka Parish in Warsaw, referred to Father Popiełuszko's activities, to the solemn masses "for the Homeland" introduced three years ago, and thanked God for allowing him to participate in the last earthly journey of Father Jerzy, his confidant and collaborator.
- Andrzej Szczepkowski, former president of the Polish Stage Artists' Union, stated:

"...the horror of this vile crime is magnified by the fact that this modern Cain is devoid not only of all human feelings, but also of the Polish imagination, consumed by lies and hatred, he does not know that the blow struck in secret will ensure this young priest, this fearless priest, entry into the triumphant circle of Polish martyrs and a great victory over the grave, that this fatal force, which adorned his forehead in life but was of no use to him, will forever crush his countrymen with shame, that the same invisible force that made us always leave this temple richer in the pure tone he was given by God after every Mass celebrated by him for the intention of our Fatherland will crush those responsible for it."

- Lech Wałęsa, the chairman of the Independent Self-Governing Trade Union "Solidarity," said:

"... Fate has chosen me to also say goodbye to Father Jerzy in a few words. The victim of this crime is asking, demanding, obligating. At the same time, the victim of this crime is asking, demanding for today, asking, demanding, committing for tomorrow. According to the teachings and what Father Jerzy preached, we know that today he is asking and requesting that we show what has remained from his lessons... Father Jerzy fell victim to bloody violence and hatred, which he always opposed with good and truth... From August 1980 until the last moments of his life, from the Warsaw Steelworks to Gdańsk, Bytom, and Jasna Góra, and so many other Polish holy places, even as far as Bydgoszcz, he accompanied "Solidarity," preaching the Word of God and the teachings of Pope John Paul II, leading unceasing prayer for the homeland. Poland, which has such priests and a sacrificial, faithful, and united people, has not perished and will not perish. We bid you farewell, servant of God, promising that we will never yield to violence, that we will be united in service to the Fatherland, and that we will respond to falsehood with truth and to evil with good. We bid you farewell with reverence, dignity, and hope for a just social peace in our homeland. Rest in peace. "Solidarity lives on because you gave your life for it..."

The presence of opposition activists was also noted: Andrzej Gwiazda, Bronisław Geremek, Seweryn Jaworski, Jan Kułaj, Jacek Kuroń, Leszek Moczulski, Zbigniew Romaszewski, Henryk Wujec, and Andrzej Wajda. Western diplomats were also present, including the chargés d'affaires of the United States and French embassies, and the ambassadors of Great Britain, Canada, Sweden, and Belgium. All accredited permanent correspondents, as well as "temporary journalists" numbering around a hundred people, gathered in the Church of St. Stanislaus Kostka.

== Banners ==
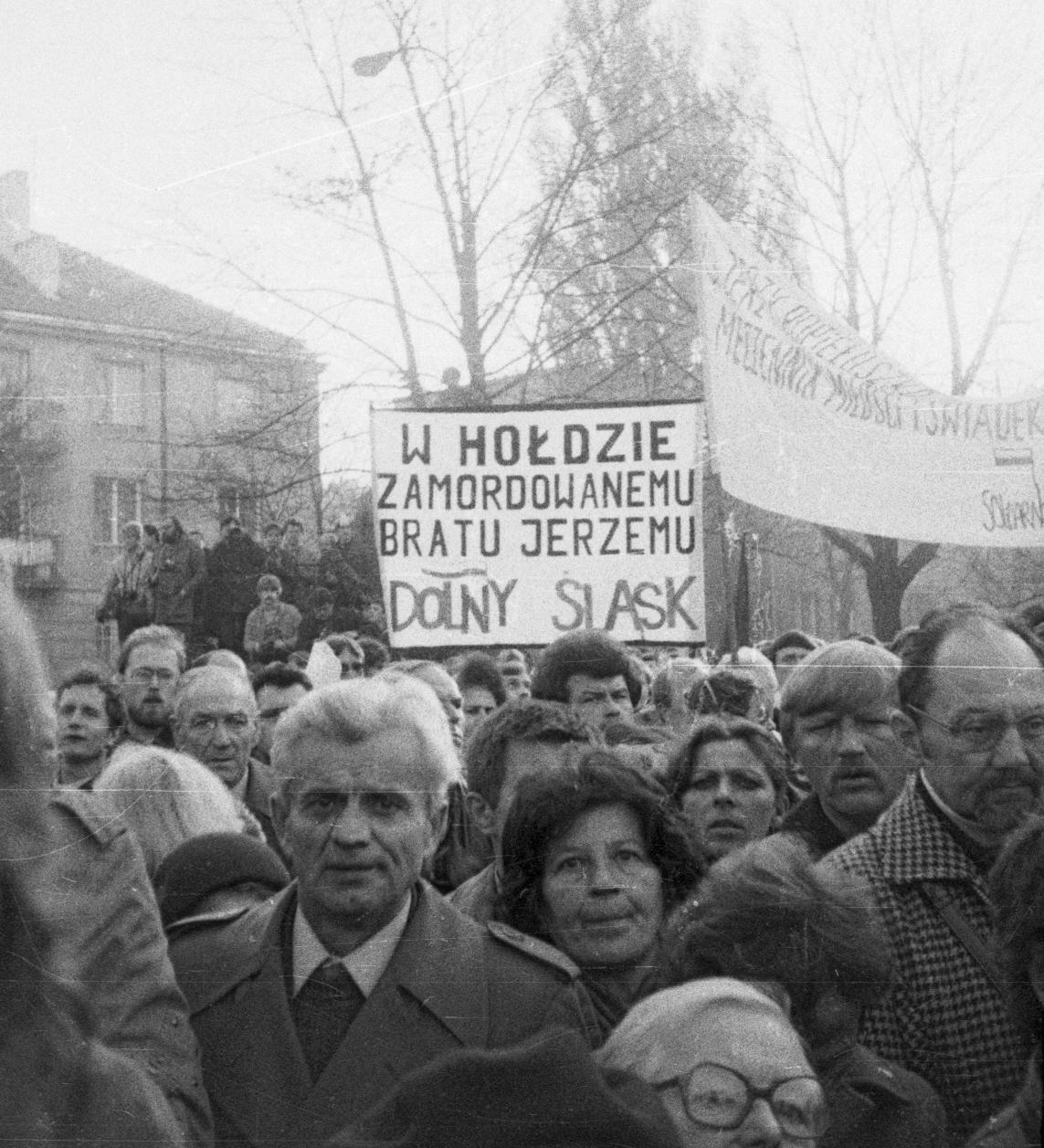
Banners

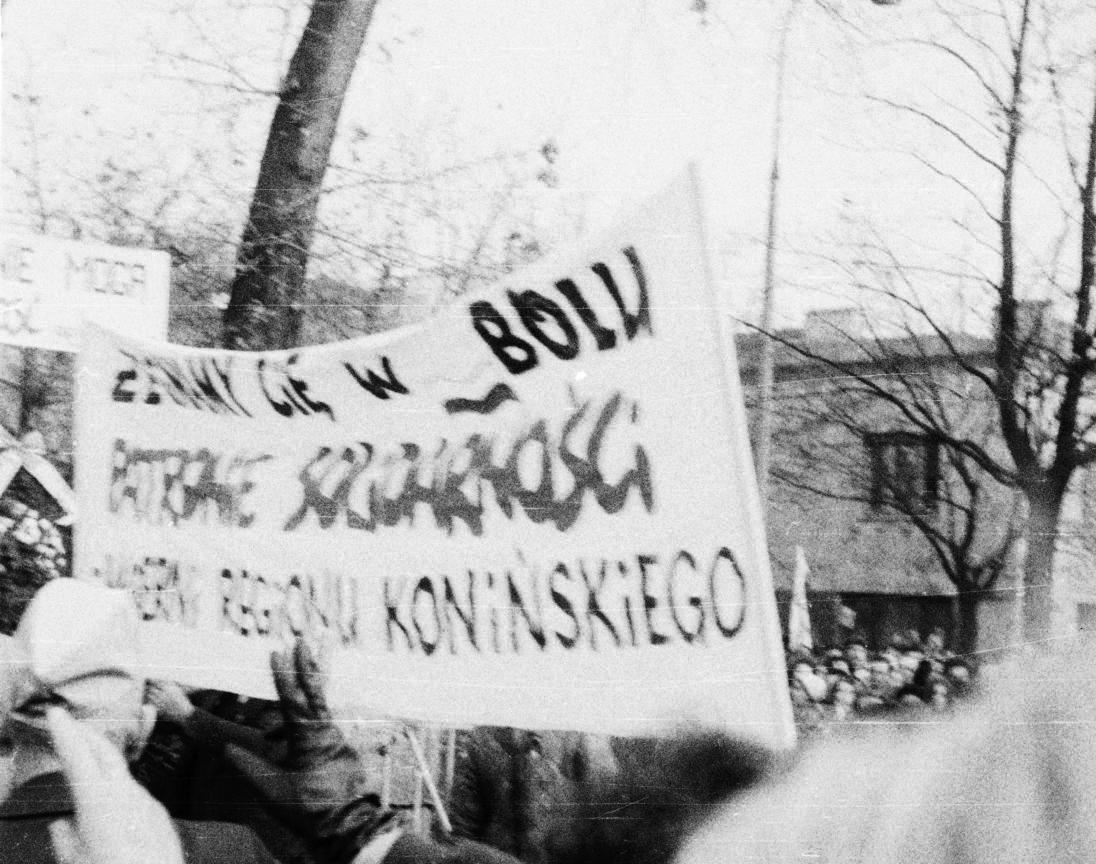
Banners

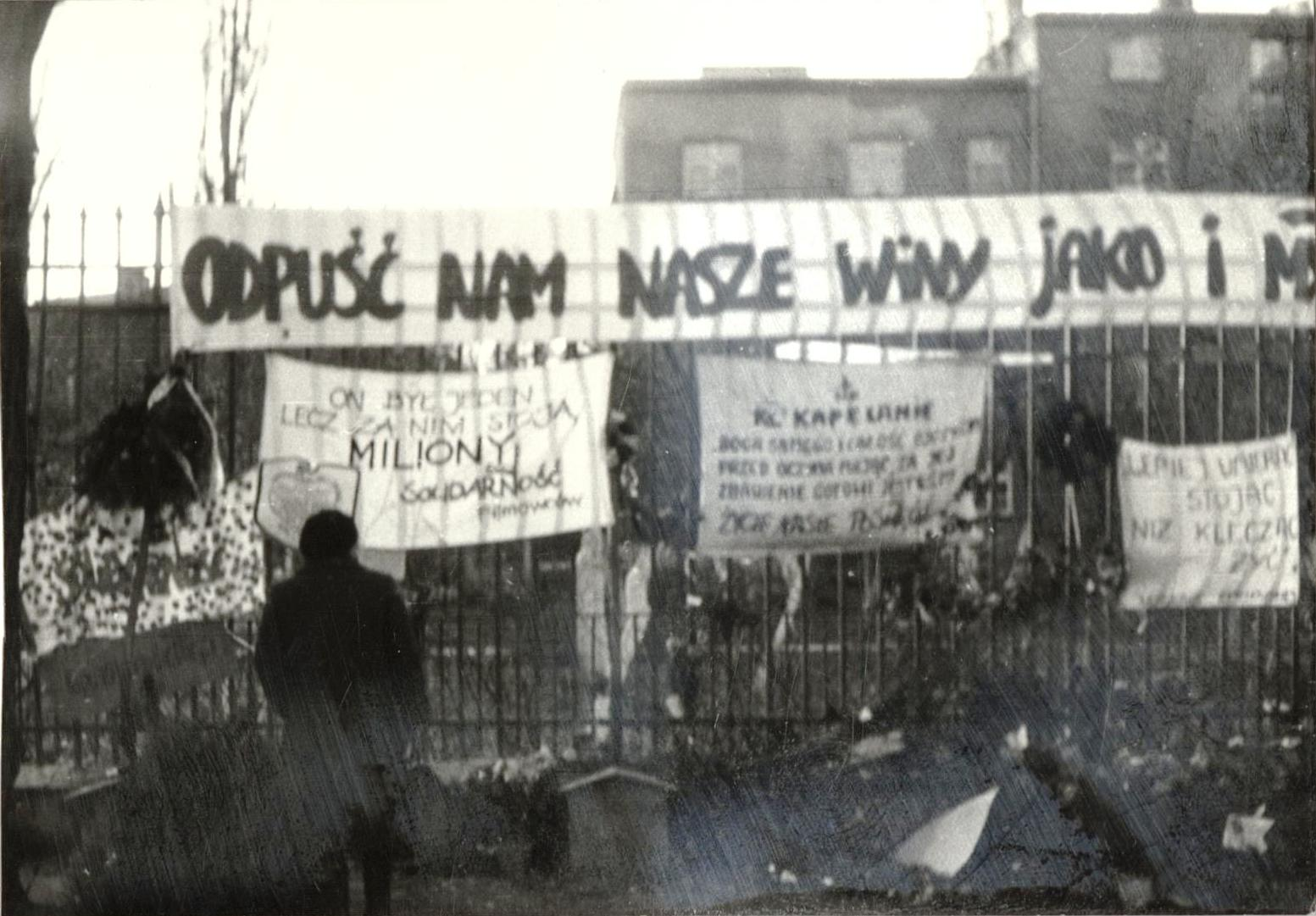
Banners

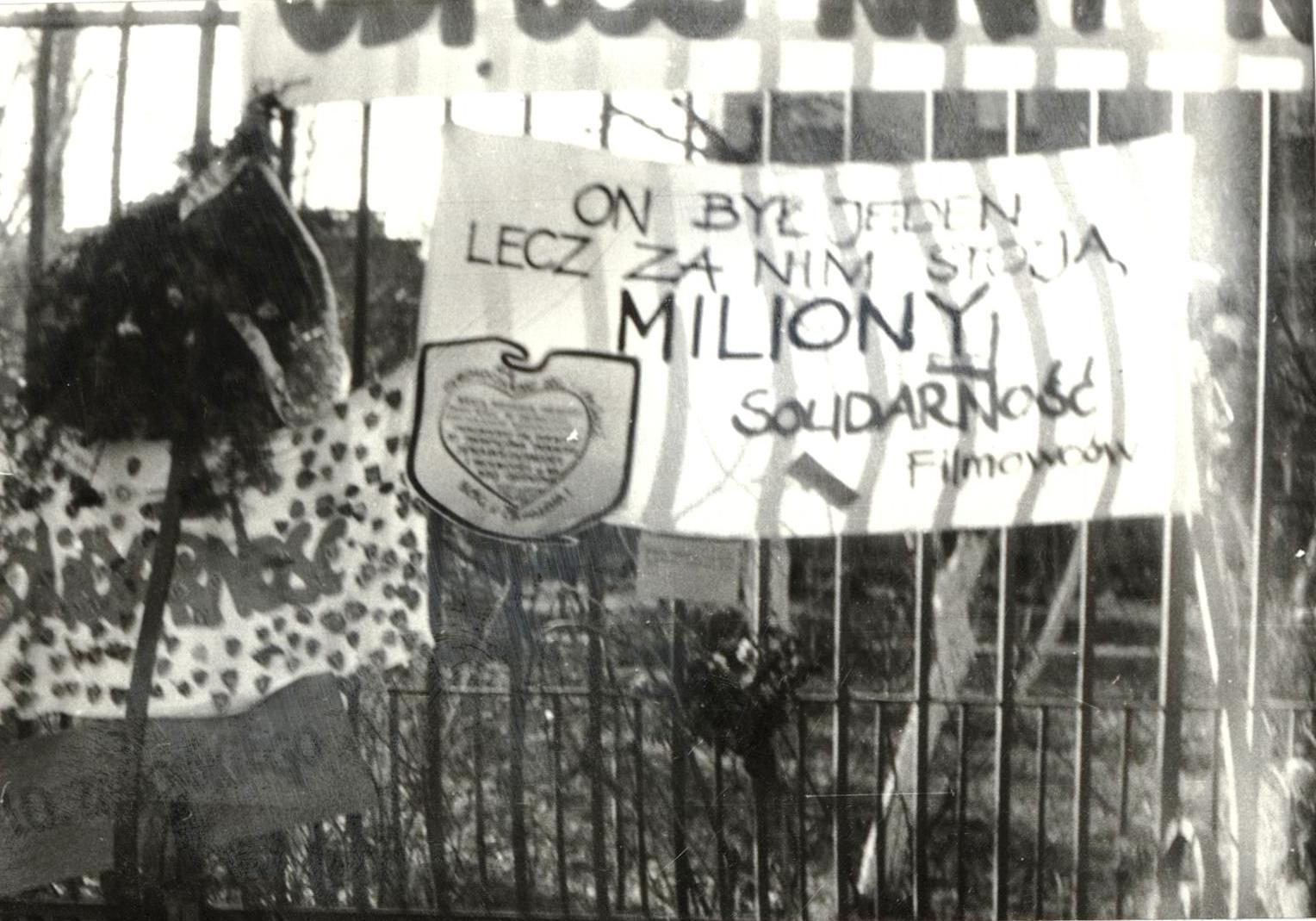
Banners

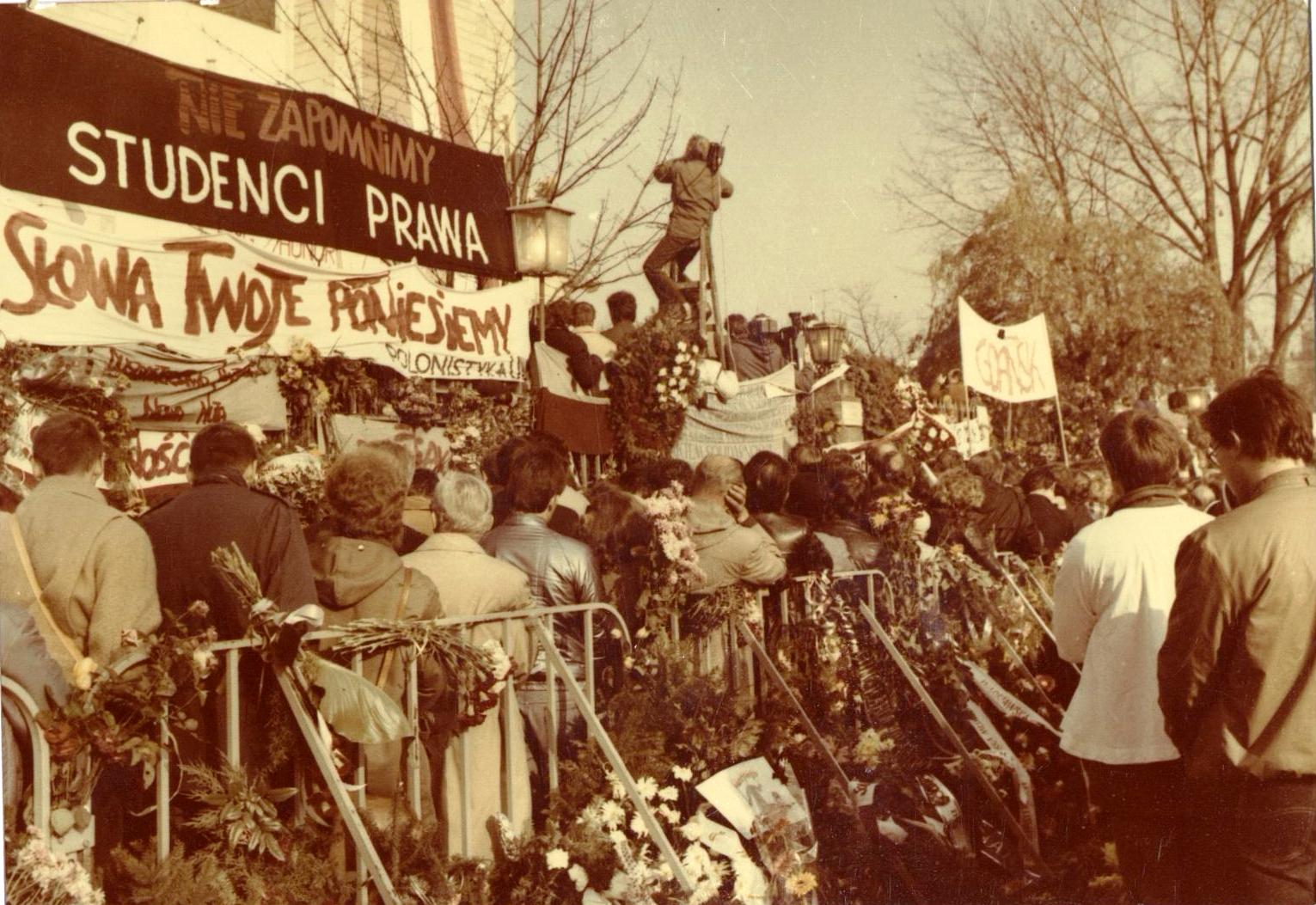
Banners

The large number of "Solidarity" symbols openly displayed during the celebrations caught the attention of diplomats and foreign correspondents. "Solidarity" badges appeared on the chests of thousands of people. Around 40 banners from workers' unions, universities, factories, and institutions bowed over Father Jerzy's coffin. Above the heads of the assembled crowd and on the churchyard fence, hundreds of banners and slogans written in a distinctive script are visible:

- "Overcome evil with good"
- "The boat bids farewell to Father Jerzy – the Apostle of 'Solidarity'"
- "Father Jerzy – Huta is with you."
- "They will never defeat you and the nation – 'Solidarity' Głogów"
- "Soldiers of the Home Army from 'Solidarity' veterans' circles are on watch!"
- "Filmmakers"
- "SGGW"
- "No to political murders!"
- "But they cannot kill the soul – 'Solidarity' Przasnysz"
- "We will carry your words – Polish Studies at the University of Warsaw"
- "We will not forget – law students"
- "You will always be with us – 'Solidarity' FSO"
- "Oh Lord, shorten this sword that cuts the country... – 'S' Starachowice"
- "Father Jerzy, Western Pomerania bids you farewell – NSZZ 'S'"
- "Father Jerzy – the saint of our times" – 13th Scout Troop"
- "'Solidarity' Węgrów"
- "Hungarians in solidarity"
- "To freedom and independence thru A group of non-believers.

== Security Service actions ==
The Security Service conducted operational activities throughout the country. Their main goal was to reduce attendance at the funeral, hence the attempts to prevent those willing from traveling to Warsaw. To this end, 48-hour preventive detentions were used, as well as road patrols whose task was to intercept people traveling to the celebrations and hinder their arrival under the pretext of road checks. As a result, many opposition activists were unable to reach the location. After the funeral, which was described as peaceful and "proceeding without disruption," the primate quickly left, and groups of 2 to 10 thousand people formed, dispersing in different directions throughout the capital, singing church hymns and chanting: "Come with us," "Drop your batons – we will forgive," "We want Lech, not Wojciech and Bujak, not Kiszczak." In the case of people heading toward the center, preventive measures were taken, and as a result, without the use of "direct coercion" – as emphasized – it was possible to disperse the crowd gathered at the intersection of Marszałkowska and Królewska streets into smaller groups. Priests of interest to the SB during their lives and after death.

== Condolences ==
Upon hearing the news of the tragic death of the Solidarity chaplain, letters and telegrams poured in from all over the world. They were sent by church hierarchs from around the world, including:

- Cardinal Joseph Höffner of Cologne, the president of the German Bishops' Conference
- Cardinal John Krol of Philadelphia
- Bishop John M. Sherlock of London
- Robert Runcie, the Archbishop of Canterbury (head of the Church of England)
- Basil, the Orthodox Metropolitan of Warsaw and All Poland
- The consistory of the Evangelical Reformed Church
- The Board of the Buddhist Union "Zen Sangha" in Warsaw

The case of Father Jerzy's murder was also of interest to the Holy See, which offered assurances of unity in pain and prayer with his compatriots and the entire Church in Poland. John Paul II also expressed his belief that Father Popiełuszko was a martyr for the faith. Among politicians, Ronald Reagan, the President of the United States, was the first to react. He stated that "the spirit of Father Popiełuszko lives on, and the conscience of the world will not rest until the perpetrators of this heinous crime are brought to justice." Letters were also sent by: Giulio Andreotti, the Italian Foreign Minister, Flaminio Piccoli, the president of the Italian Christian Democracy, Adolfo Pérez Esquivel, the 1980 Nobel Peace Prize laureate and coordinator of the Peace and Justice Service.

The Workers' Council of the Warsaw Steelworks, as a sign of mourning on the second, third, and fourth day of November of this year, tied black ribbons to the steelworkers' flags at the main gate and at the steelworks departments and lowered them to half-mast.

== See also ==
- Assassination of Jerzy Popiełuszko
