= Okopy, Podlaskie Voivodeship =

Okopy
- Village
- Location within Poland
- Coordinates: 53°35′16″N 23°09′07″E
- Country: Poland
- Voivodeship: Podlaskie
- County: Sokółka
- Gmina: Suchowola
- Time zone: UTC+1 (CET)
  - Summer (DST): UTC+2 (CEST)

Okopy [ɔˈkɔpɨ] is a village in the administrative district of Gmina Suchowola, within Sokółka County, Podlaskie Voivodeship, in north-eastern Poland.

== History ==
Okopy was a royal village of the Polish–Lithuanian Commonwealth, founded in the 16th century.

Jerzy Popiełuszko, a Polish Roman Catholic priest, associated with the Solidarity union, was born in Okopy on 14 September 1947. He was murdered by three agents of the Polish communist internal intelligence agency, the Służba Bezpieczeństwa, (English: Security Service of the Ministry of Internal Affairs) who were shortly thereafter tried and convicted of the murder. He has been recognized as a martyr by the Catholic Church, and was beatified on 6 June 2010.
