= Grzegorz Piotrowski =

Polish former captain of Security Service (born 1951)

- Born: 3 May 1951 (age 75); Łódź, Poland
- Military career
- Allegiance: Security Service (formerly)
- Service years: 1974–1984
- Units: • Rocket Forces and Artillery Officers High School in Toruń • 5th Supply Battalion in Gubin • Municipal Headquarters of the Citizens' Militia in Łódź, Department IV • 4th Department of the Ministry of Internal Affairs • Group “D”at the Ministry of Internal Affairs
- Known for: The ringleader of the kidnapping and murder of Jerzy Popiełuszko
- Other work: • Teacher • Printer (during his stay in the Warsaw-Mokotów Remand Center) • Writer and IT specialist (after 2004)

Grzegorz Sławomir Piotrowski (born 3 May 1951 in Łódź) is a former captain of Security Service who was responsible for the kidnapping and murder of Jerzy Popiełuszko and was sentenced to 25 years in prison until he was released roughly a decade later, but was demoted to a lower rank.

== Biography ==
=== Early life and family ===
Born to Władysław and Irena (née Chojnacka), (Note: It was Iwona, née Pisarska according to Pietrzyk-Dąbrowska and Sztama.), Grzegorz was raised in an intellectual family. His father Władysław Piotrowski (born Władysław Ryszard Pietruszka in 1918) had attended a secondary education and changed his surname to Piotrowski in 1946, then married Irena. He then worked at the cottage and applied in Łódź and the process plant in Łódź. Piotrowski was raised by his mother, Iwona Piotrowski, and his parents were divorced in 1955, two years after Grzegorz birth. His mother Irena (1923–1973) was a chemical engineer, was married three times, taught at vocational school in Łódź, and was active in the Polish United Workers' Party (PZPR) and in Polish Teachers' Union. His mother Irena died at the age of 50 due to her illness while Piotrowski was praying for her recovery as he was close to the Church.

Piotrowski then graduated from one of his general education liceum, primary and secondary, school (Note: Wówczas to liceum nosiło imię „19 Stycznia”, dziś – Jana Bytnara „Rudego”.) in Łódź.

Piotrowski has (or had) an older brother who is five years his senior.

=== Economic secondary school in University of Łódź ===
After passing his exams in high school, he applied to the Faculty of Electrical Engineering to study industrial electric engineering at the University of Łódź, na kierunek elektrotechnika przemysłu, but he was not accepted to take a job at the Elta factory named after the Peasant Battalions, a Polish partisan organization during World War II. However, one year later, he reapplied to the University of Łódź as a Mathematics, Physics, and Chemistry student, then he completed military training. In addition to complete military training, Piotrowski played basketball during his recreation and held swimming and sailing licenses.

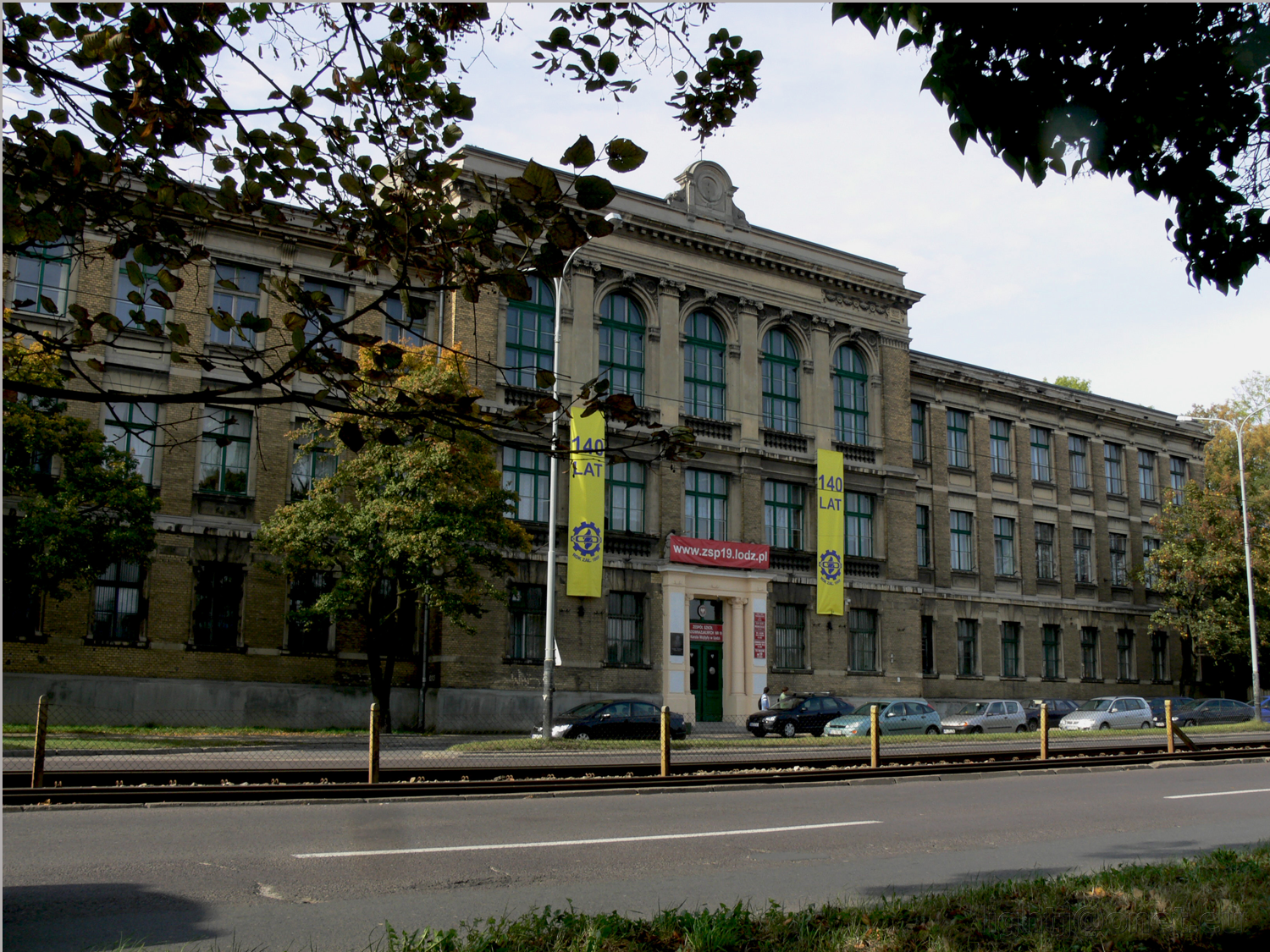
Piotrowski's mother Irena taught at the vocational school complex in Łódź until 1973.

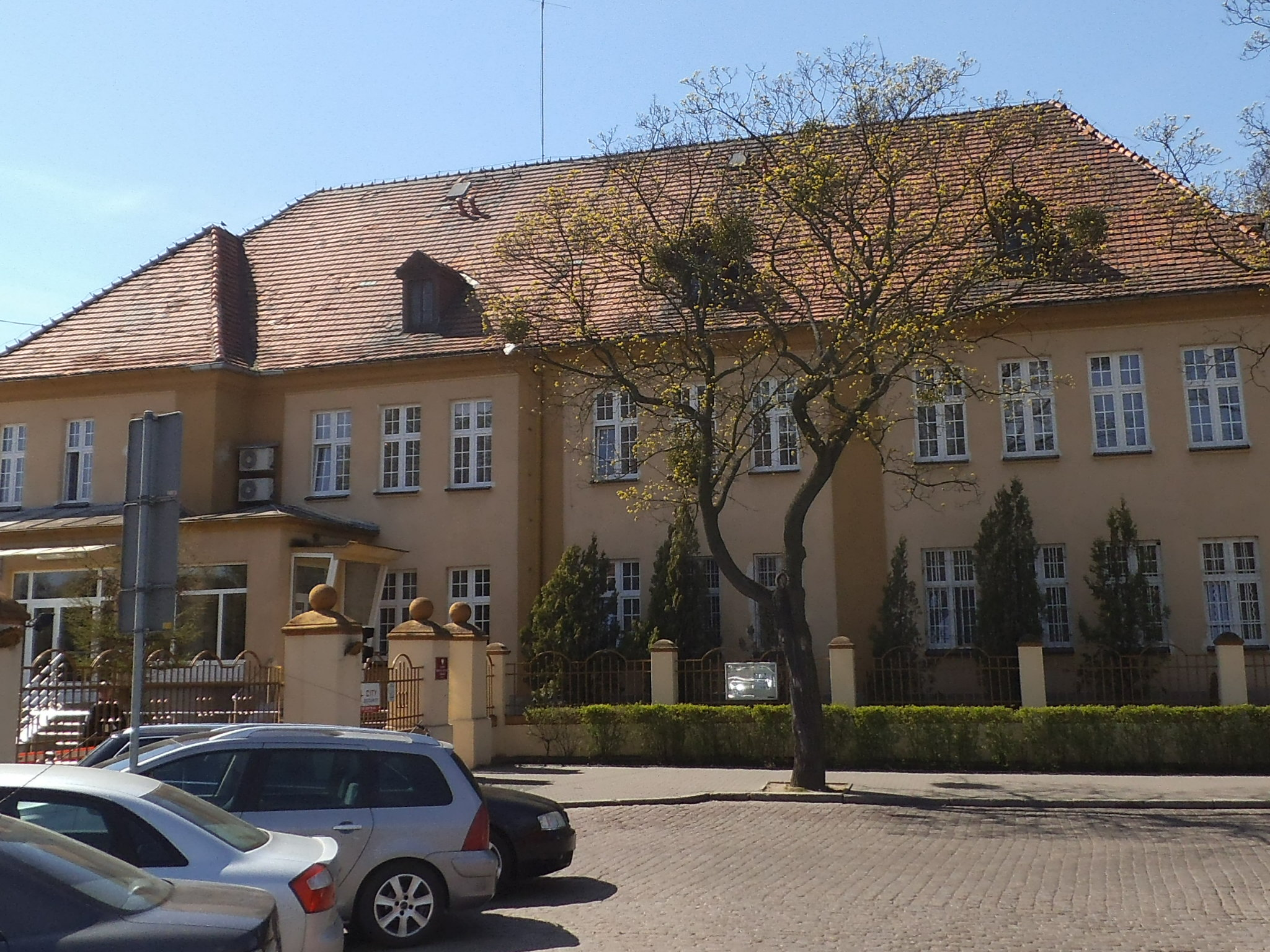
In 1974 Piotrowski was at the Internal Military Service as part of the Reserve Officer Schools (2015) in Toruń.

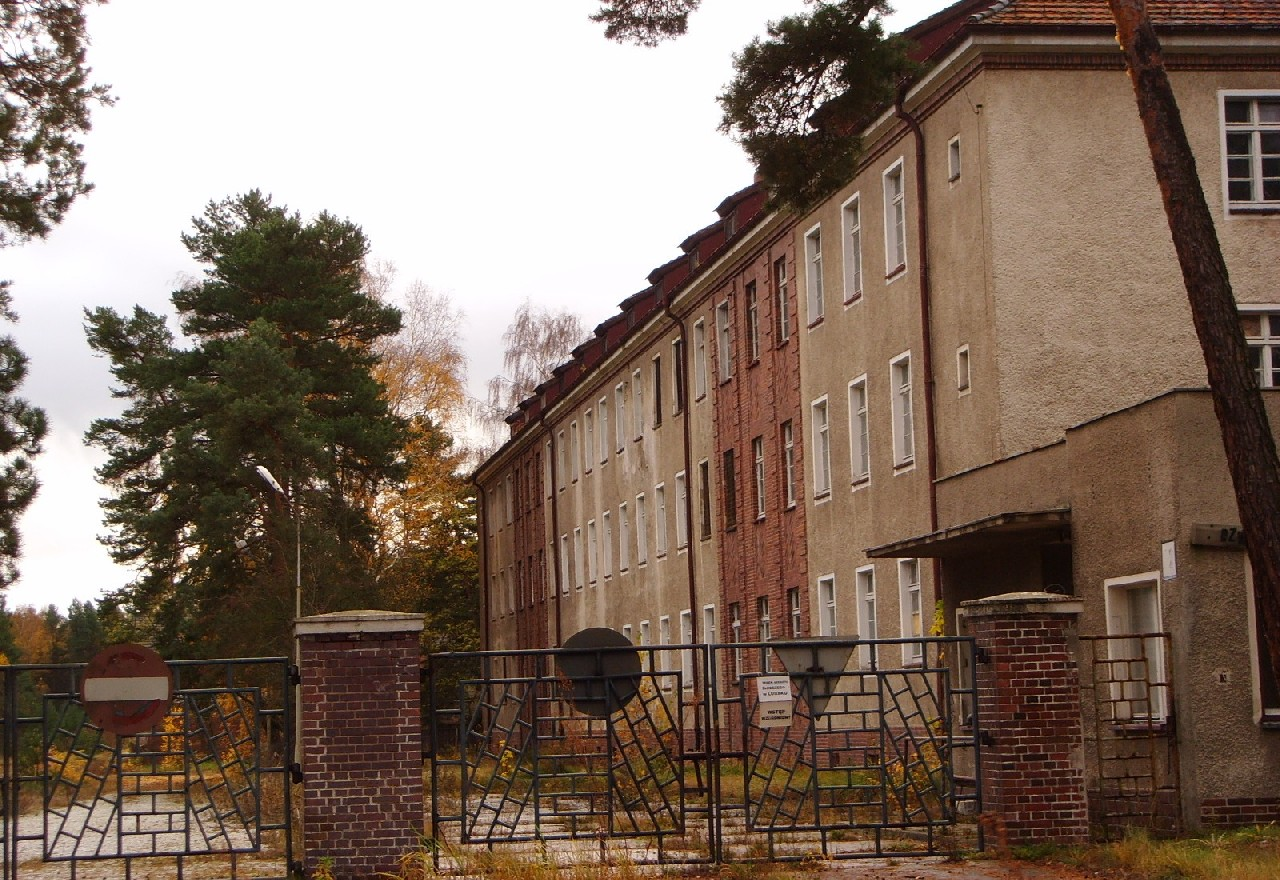
Piotrowski graduated from SOR in Gubin in 1974.

In 1973, before graduating from the University of Łódź, he found a job at the then Economic High School No. 1 on Astronautów Street in Łódź as a mathematics teacher. His mother Irena died that same year. In September 1973, he completed his master's degree at the University of Łódź with a specialization in general mathematics, with a good grade based on the master's thesis entitled “Polynomials over any ring,” which was graded as good by the supervisor and satisfactory plus by the reviewer and a mathematician. In 1974, he was sent to the Reserve Officers' School at the General Józef Bem Higher School of Rocket Forces and Artillery in Toruń, and after graduating, he completed his so-called command training as an officer, platoon commander in the 5th Supply Battalion in Gubin.

In December 1974, he was promoted to second lieutenant and qualified for the military reserve. His commander in Gubin stated in his opinion: "A soldier with little discipline, ambition, and conscientiousness. He left his place of service without permission before the end of his shift, did not take care of the equipment entrusted to him, and caused a car accident." In December 1974, after completing the SOR, he returned to his teaching position at High School No. 1 in Łódź, where he worked for several months, i.e., until September 1975. From March to November 1975, he attended the Second Television Course in Computer Science (third degree), organized by the Research and Development Center for Computer Science in Warszaw.

=== Service in security forces ===
On 16 September 1975, he began working in Department IV of the Citizens' Militia in Łódź, dealing with the fight against the Catholic Church in the then Łódź Voivodeship. Piotrowski was persuaded to work for the security services by his father-in-law, Jan Pietrzak, who was an employee of the Municipal Headquarters of the Citizens' Militia in Łódź between 1948 and 1972.In 1977, Piotrowski joined Polish United Workers' Party, and was assigned to provide operational security for a pilgrimage to Jasna Góra, organized by the academic chaplaincy in Łódź, on May. From October 1977 to June 1978, he completed postgraduate studies at the Academy of Internal Affairs in Warsaw. In August 1979, he submitted an application to the provincial commander of the Citizens' Militia in Łódź for permission to begin studying at the Evening University of Marxism–Leninism. The application was approved. (Note: Nie wiadomo jednak, kiedy i czy w ogóle studium to ukończył.).

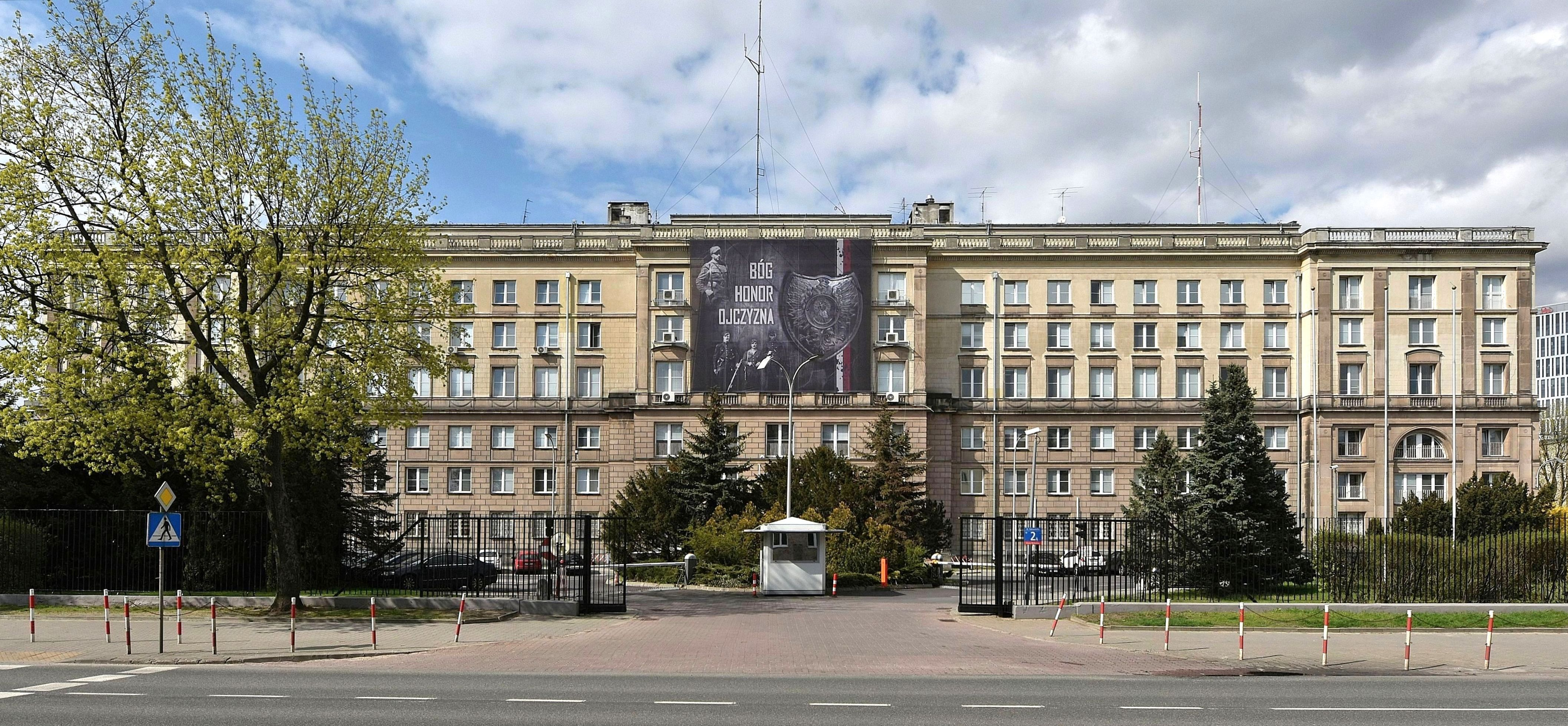
From 1981 to 1984, he worked in Department IV of the Ministry of Internal Affairs (photo from 2017).

On 1 April 1981, he was transferred to Department IV of the Ministry of Internal Affairs in Warsaw, to the position of deputy head of Division I. His promotion was initiated by the then director of Department IV, Konrad Straszewski. Piotrowski was involved in combating the Catholic Church and religious associations in Poland. He held this position for a year. His work was assessed at the time by Colonel Zenon Płatek, then director of Department IV of the Ministry of Internal Affairs, who wrote about Captain Piotrowski: "He has a great ability to make accurate decisions, taking into account the current political situation. He manages his subordinates well. He is a good organizer and initiator of numerous operational concepts. He is characterized by insight, inquisitiveness, and persistence in action. He has the ability to think and reason analytically with ease and to express his thoughts precisely. His attitude and commitment place him among the ranks of exemplary managerial staff.”

From December 1982 to February 1983, he held the position of head of Group D of the Fourth Department of the Ministry of Internal Affairs, which dealt with activities against the Catholic Church in Poland, with the rank of captain in the Security Service. According to the preserved documentation of trips made by the Fourth Department of the Ministry of Internal Affairs, Piotrowski repeatedly participated in meetings with the KGB's department for diversion and ideological struggle between 1971 and 1982. In 1982, Adam Pietruszka wrote about his work: He shows a lot of initiative and looks for new ways to solve operational problems. Sometimes he reacts too impulsively, getting personally involved in tasks assigned to employees. "He is a good organizer. He is disciplined and friendly. At the turn of 1982 and 1983, while serving as head of Division VI of Department IV of the Ministry of Internal Affairs, he organized a provocation (Note: Miała polegać na podrzuceniu do krakowskiego mieszkania księdza Andrzeja Bardeckiego z „Tygodnika Powszechnego” spreparowanego przez bezpiekę pamiętnika rzekomej kochanki Wojtyły w którym znajdowała się informacja, że miał z nią dziecko.) aimed at Pope John Paul II. The provocation failed because, under the influence of alcohol, Piotrowski, driving a company Fiat Mirafiori, caused an accident by hitting a concrete pole in front of the Holiday Inn hotel in the center of Kraków.

In January 1983, together with three other Security Service officers, he kidnapped Janusz Krupski and burned him with a corrosive liquid. In February 1983, Piotrowski was dismissed from his position as head of Department VI. (Note: Jego dymisja wiązała się prawdopodobnie z nieudaną akcją prowokacyjną wobec przyjaciela papieża Jana Pawła II – ks. Andrzeja Bardeckiego. Piotrowski, który kierował wówczas tą akcją i sam także w niej uczestniczył, będąc pod wpływem alkoholu, doprowadził do stłuczki i się zdekonspirował. Choć informacja ta nie ma potwierdzenia w źródłach, można domniemywać, że była to bezpośrednia przyczyna odwołania.). In August 1983, Piotrowski fatally struck Marianna Kosińska, a Warsaw resident, in an unfortunate accident. The woman died despite his efforts to help her and take her to the Czerniakowski Hospital on Stępińska Street in Warsaw. An investigation was launched against him, but it was discontinued after several months. After this event, Captain Piotrowski returned to Division I of Department IV of the Ministry of Internal Affairs as head of the division, where he worked until 19 October 1984. In February 1984, the prosecutor's office allowed Piotrowski to examine the body of Piotr Bartoszcze, an activist of the agricultural Solidarity movement, but did not allow a representative of the family to be present.

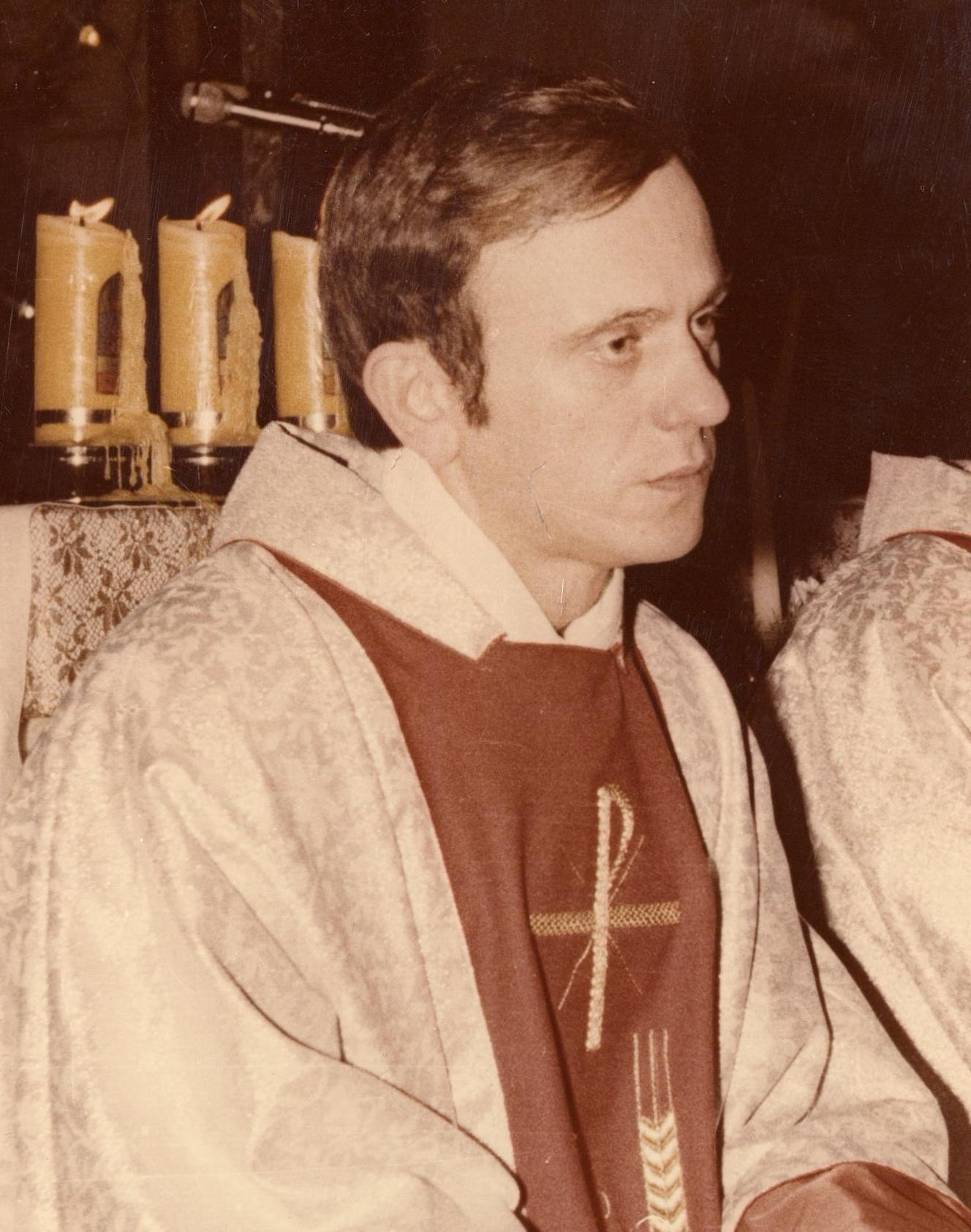
Father Jerzy Popiełuszko

On 13 October 1984, Captain Piotrowski and two officers attempted to assassinate a priest Jerzy Popiełuszko (Note: Służba Bezpieczeństwa założyła Jerzemu Popiełuszce Teczkę Ewidencji Operacyjnej na Księdza (TEOK) już 15 listopada 1965, gdy był jeszcze alumnem seminarium. Ponieważ jednak nagabywany Popiełuszko kategorycznie odmówił współpracy ze służbami PRL, materiały zdjęto z ewidencji 4 maja 1982. We wrześniu 1982 r. Służba Bezpieczeństwa ks. Popiełuszko zaczęła się ponownie interesować operacyjnie, gdy Wydział IV Stołecznego Urzędu Spraw Wewnętrznych (SUSW) w Warszawie zaczął prowadzić sprawę o krypt. „Popiel”.), where on the Ostróda - Olsztynek highway, he intended to throw a stone at the windshield of the priest's car, but the priest's driver, Waldemar Chrostowski (Note: Źródło Leszka Pietrzaka jako biegłego z IPN wskazuje, że w lutym 1984 r. funkcjonariuszom SB udało się zarejestrować Waldemara Chrostowskiego jako „Desperata” osobistego kierowcę Popiełuszki.) maneuvered his car around Piotrowski. Inspired by his immediate superior, Adam Pietruszka, together with two other Security Service officers, Waldemar Chmielewski and Leszek Pękala, he kidnapped and murdered Father Jerzy on 19 October 1984, which he was responsible for. Piotrowski and two Security Service officers kidnapped Father Popiełuszko and his driver, Waldemar Chrostowski, who managed to jump out of the moving car.

On Tuesday morning, 23 October 1984, Captain Grzegorz Piotrowski was detained in the office of the minister of internal affairs, Major General. Czesław Kiszczak, and on 25 October 1984, he was placed in temporary detention and stayed in Mokotów Prison (Pavilion III of the Mokotów prison, which was permanently at the disposal of the investigative office), 37 Rakowiecka Street. On 31 October 1984, he was dismissed from service on disciplinary grounds from Security Service (Poland), demoted to the rank of private and, along with his expulsion from the service, he was removed from the Polish United Workers' Party. Grzegorz Piotrowski served as a Security Service (Poland)Security Service for 9 years.

The investigation preceding the Toruń trial lasted 51 days. The trial began on 27 December 1984, and lasted until 7 February 1985. By judgment of the Provincial Court in Toruń. On 7 February 1985, he was sentenced to 25 years in prison for the murder of Father Jerzy. (The prosecutor demanded that Grzegorz Piotrowski be found guilty and sentenced to death, as well as permanently deprived of his civil rights). Following the ruling of the Provincial Court in Toruń, the defense attorney for the defendant Piotrowski filed an appeal. The conviction of Piotrowski and the other perpetrators of the crime became final on April 22, 1985. Supreme Court of Poland agreed with the position of the Provincial Court, which indicated that the intention and decision to take Father Popiełuszko's life were made at the moment when none of the perpetrators checked whether he was still alive before throwing him into the water. 17 December 1987, en route to amnesty, his sentence was reduced to 15 years' imprisonment, which aroused public discontent. Professor of law, criminal law Krystyna Daszkiewicz pointed to a violation of the letter of the law in mitigating the defendant's sentence (Note: Pierwszym naruszeniem jest podstawa prawna, jaką podano opinii publicznej, a na podstawie której dokonano amnestii. Mowa tutaj o ustawie z dnia 17 lipca 1986 r. o szczególnym postępowaniu wobec sprawców niektórych przestępstw (Dz. U. RP nr 26, poz. 126). Ustawa ta jednak nie przewiduje łagodzenia kary wymierzonej za zbrodnię pozbawienia życia. Kolejne naruszenie prawa według prof. Daszkiewicz to podwójne zastosowanie amnestii. Przepis jednej i tej samej ustawy amnestyjnej nie może być zastosowany co do tego samego przestępcy wielokrotnie. Ustawy amnestyjne z reguły bowiem mówią o darowaniu oskarżonemu kary o określony ułamek, np. o 1/3. Kiedy więc zastosuje się jeden przepis kilkakrotnie do tej samej osoby, procent złagodzenia kary nie odpowiada ułamkowi jaki wskazywała ustawa odnośnie pierwotnie orzeczonego wyroku.). Piotrowski served his sentence in several prisons (including Mokotóv Prison, prison in Sieradz). In the 1990s, the court refused to give him parole. In 1994, the Penitentiary Department of the Provincial Court in Lublin due to his family's poor financial situation, allowed him to leave prison early (during this period, he helped his wife run a travel agency and, under a changed name, gave private lessons in mathematics), but after a few months, in 1995 (after the Supreme Court upheld the extraordinary appeal of the minister of justice, Włodzimierz Cimoszewicz), the court decided that he should return to prison. He was sent to the prison in Opole, where he remained until the end of his sentence.

He completed his sentence on 16 August 2001. Convinced of his innocence, he applied for early release 19 times. Piotrowski served 10 years (with breaks for leave). On October 4, 2002, he was once again sentenced by the District Court in Łódź to 8 months' imprisonment (changed in 2003 by the Regional Court in Łódź to a fine), for insulting courts and judges in a television interview given during a conference promoting the anti-clerical weekly magazine Fakty i Mity (Facts and Myths) in 2000. In the interview, he stated: Judges make fools of themselves, balancing on the edge of ridicule.

While in prison, Piotrowski gave an extensive interview to Tadeusz Fredro-Boniecki. Based on this interview, a publication entitled “The Victory of Father Jerzy” was released, in which he expressed regret for what he had done: “I am ashamed, and that means more to me than regret. I ask you to trust in the purity of the intentions that guide my hand today.”. In 2000, he gave an interview to TVP3 Łódź journalists, in which he pointed out that the death of Father Jerzy Popiełuszko was accidental because “he was unfortunately tied up and suffocated himself,” which contradicted what he said in the interview, in which Piotrowski regretted killing the priest.

=== 2001–2025 ===
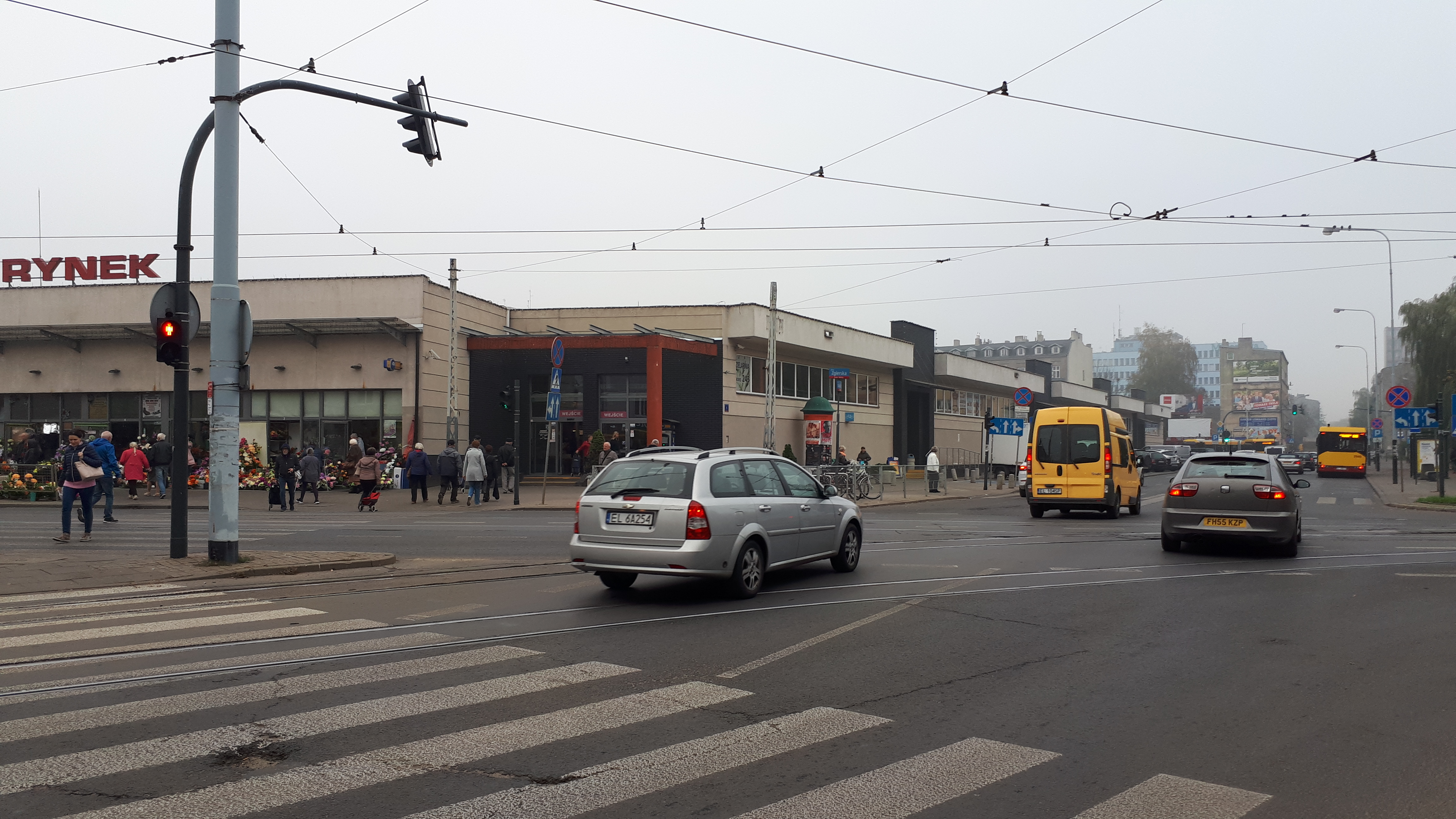
A former Security Service officer currently lives in Łódź, in the Bałuty district, under a changed name.

After his release from prison, Piotrowski was credited with collaborating with the weekly magazine Fakty i Mity, where he allegedly published articles under the pseudonym Sławomir Janisz. In 2005, while using this name, he was recognized by the brother of Krzysztof Gotowski, who was murdered in 2003. Later, he allegedly used the pseudonyms Dominika Nagel and Anna Tarczyńska. Roman Kotliński stated in the weekly that he had never employed Piotrowski. In 2011, the daily newspaper Rzeczpospolita stated that Piotrowski wrote for the weekly magazine Fakty i Mity under the pseudonyms Anna Tarczyńska and Dominika Nagel, but that the money for this work went to the account of his wife, Janina P. The editor-in-chief of “Fakty i Mity” accused the author of the article of lying and announced that he would sue, but this did not happen. In 2011, the Rzeczpospolita daily newspaper claimed that Piotrowski wrote for the weekly magazine Fakty i Mity under the pseudonyms Anna Tarczyńska and Dominika Nagel, but that the money for this work went to the account of his wife, Janina P. The editor-in-chief of Fakty i Mity accused the author of the article of lying and announced that he would take legal action, but this did not happen. Grzegorz Piotrowski receives a pension from the Social Insurance Institution (ZUS), and therefore the provisions of the decommunization law do not apply to him, because this law concerns persons who are covered by pension benefits provided by the Pension Office of the Ministry of Internal Affairs and Administration. Today, a former officer Social Security agent Grzegorz Piotrowski is 74 years old and lives in the Bałuty district of Łódź under his wife's maiden name.

== Awards ==
Career advancements:

- Second lieutenant (SOR) – 1974
- Lieutenant – 1978
- Captain – 1982
- Private (demoted) – 1984

== Service record ==
Full service history of Grzegorz Piotrowski:

No.	Name of unit	Cell name	Position	Start date
1	KM MO Łódź	Department IV	inspector	16 September 1975
2	KW MO Łódź	Department IV	senior inspector	1 November 1976
3	KW MO Łódź	Department IV	section head	1 July 1978
4	KW MO Łódź	Department IV	Deputy Chief	1 November 1979
5	MSW Warszawa	Departament IV	Deputy Chief	1 April 1981
6	MSW Warszawa	Departament IV	Chief	1 September 1982
7	MSW Warszawa	Departament IV	Chief	15 February 1983

In October 1975, he married (in a church ceremony) Janina Pietrzak, born in 1953, a graduate of the Textile School Complex in Łódź. They had two children: an older daughter, Dominika, and a younger son, Grzegorz. Grzegorz Piotrowski's wife started working on September 1, 1982, at the Passport Department of the Citizens' Militia in Warsaw as a clerk. On November 6, 1984, she was dismissed from her job at the Passport Department of the Ministry of Internal Affairs and, under a changed surname (Note: Janina Piotrowska po zmianie nazwiska – Janina Pietrzak.) now lives in Łódź, where, after the political transformation, she started a small business providing tourist services. Grzegorz Piotrowski worked for a friend's import-export trading company and also earned extra money by tutoring. He lives with his wife Janina in the Bałuty district of Łódź under a changed surname.

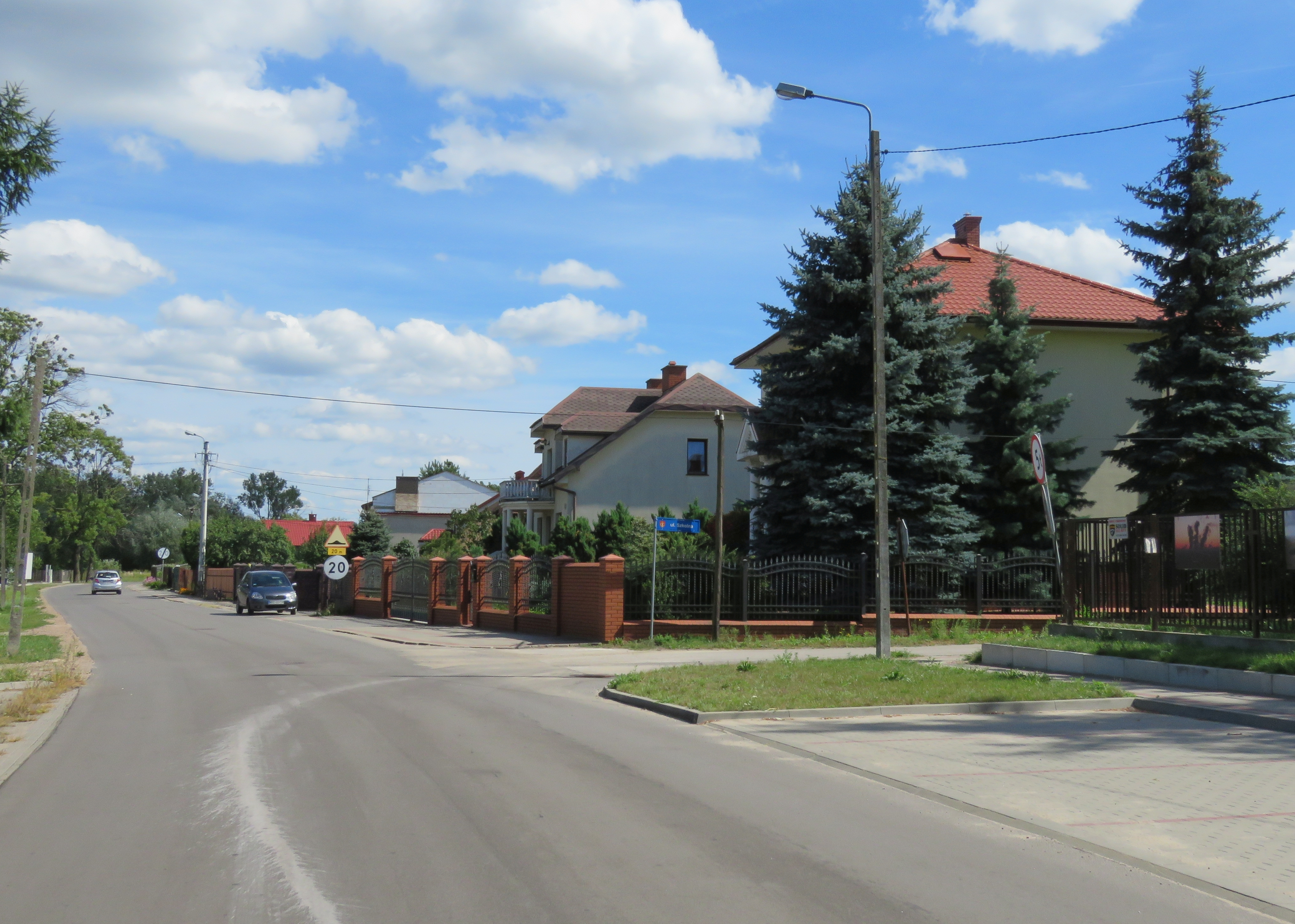
Prosecutor Witkowski indicates with high probability that Father Jerzy Popiełuszko was held and tortured in the Kazun area.

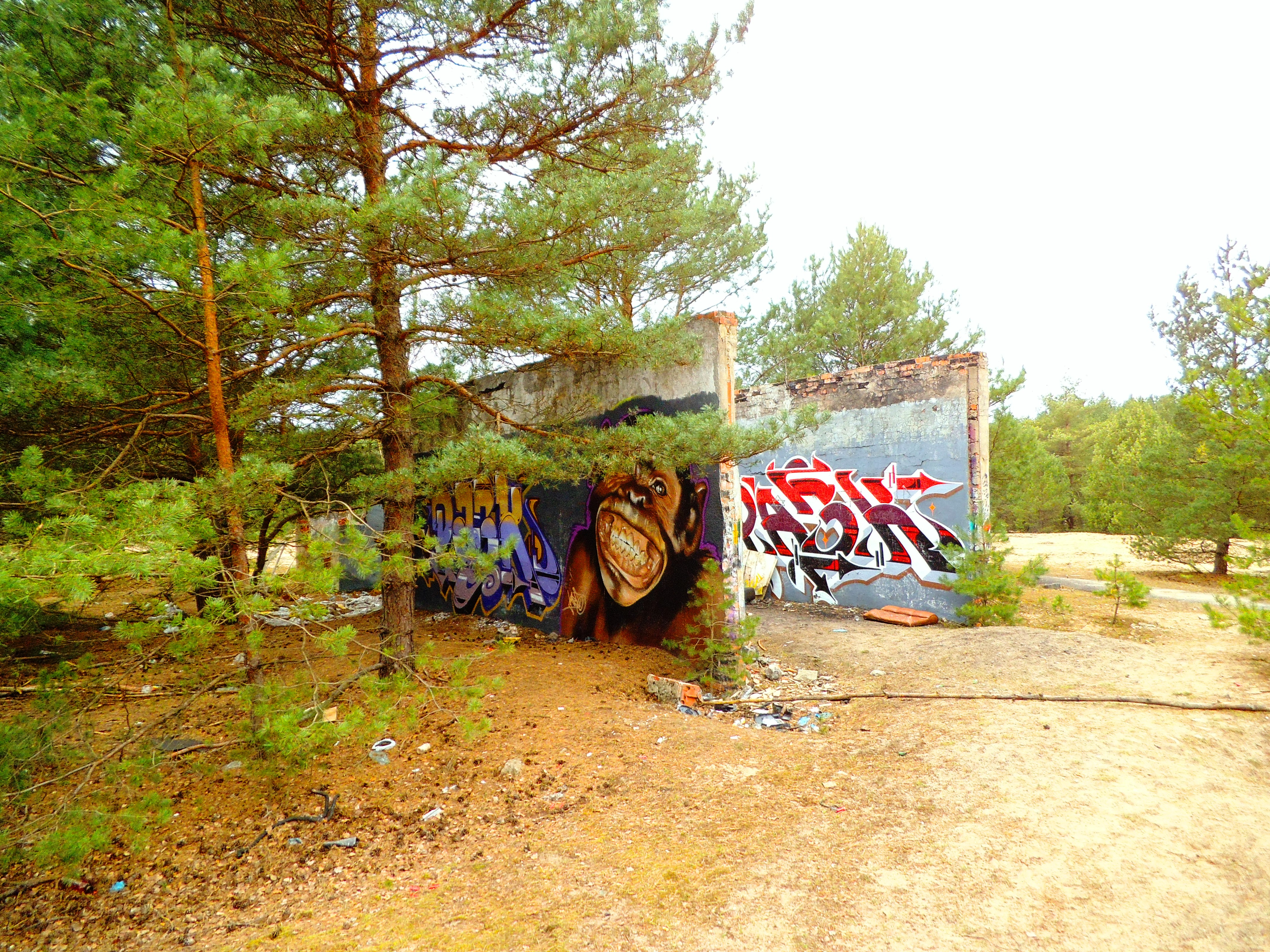
Hypothesis of Father Popiełuszko's detention at the Soviet Army base in Toruń (Photo: remains of the 902nd Independent Pontoon Battalion and the 899th Ammunition and Air Armament Depot)

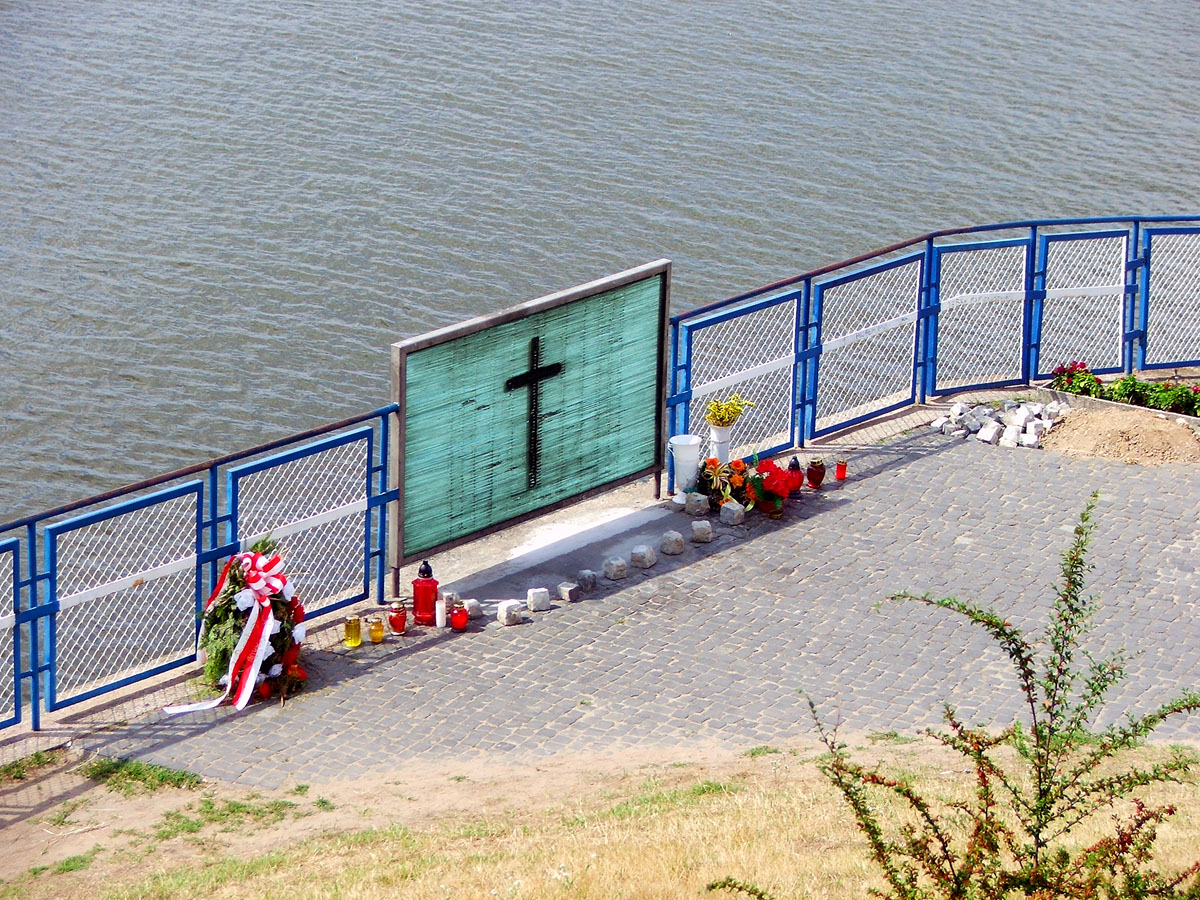
The dam in Włocławek, a memorial to Father Popiełuszko, was knocked down into the Vistula River from the level of the roadway.

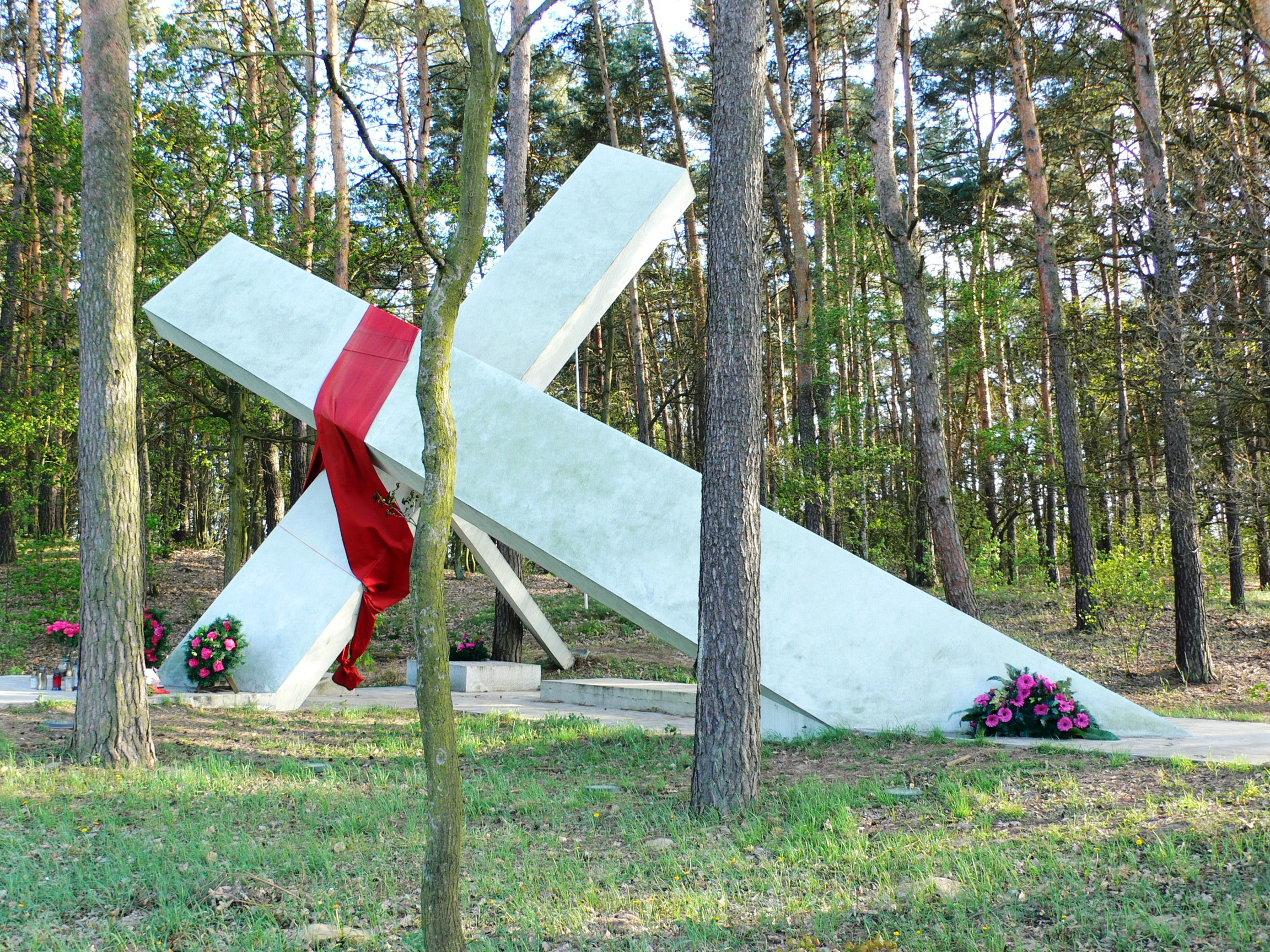
Górsk and a monument commemorating the assassination of Father Popiełuszko

In 1990–1991, the case of Father Popiełuszko was handled by prosecutor Andrzej Witkowski, who determined that on October 19, 1984, apart from Piotrowski's group, another group was operating, with Internal Military Service (six officers of the Bydgoszcz Internal Security Agency), who were evasive during the interrogation. Prosecutor Witkowski's investigation indicated that plainclothes officers from the Bydgoszcz Military Security Service were present in Górsk, where Popiełuszko was kidnapped. Piotrowski's officers took the driver (Chrostowski) out of the Golf, put him in their Fiat and handcuffed him. Meanwhile, officers other than Piotrowski's group took Father Popiełuszko to another vehicle parked about 200 meters away, on a side road. The vehicles arrived in Toruń, without Chrostowski. Father Popiełuszko was severely beaten under a bridge in Toruń and then handed over to officers from the Bydgoszcz Military Security Service. They testified to Witkowski that they took Popiełuszko to an ammunition bunker. (Note: W planach sprawców morderstwa ks. Popiełuszki bunkier w okolicy Kazunia był przygotowywany wcześniej. W jednym z nich w bunkrze znaleźli niszę, w którą według ich oceny mógłby został włożony człowiek, a wejście do tej niszy mogłoby zostać zasypane kamieniami. Sprawcy stwierdzili, że taki bunkier, jak i samo miejsce jego położenia nadaje się do uwięzienia ks. Jerzego Popiełuszki.) in Kazun near Nowy Dwór Mazowiecki. There, Russian-speaking men were waiting for them. On the way from Toruń to Kazun, Piotrowski's group continued to follow the WSW officers, and in Kazun itself, Piotrowski was to severely beat Popiełuszko once again, and that was to be the end of his involvement in the case. At least one of the WSW officers from Bydgoszcz who testified before Witkowski in 1991 named three people who (together with the aforementioned Russian-speaking individuals) took Popiełuszko into custody in Kazun. They were three WSW officers in Warsaw with the ranks of colonel, captain, and major.

Witkowski's investigation indicated that it was most likely the Kazuń Polski, where the priest was held for several consecutive days in one of the old military bunkers by a second operational group (a counterintelligence or military intelligence group, another operational group of the Ministry of Internal Affairs). Circumstantial evidence also indicates that between October 20 and 25, 1984, the priest may have been held at one of the Soviet units in the Kazun area, where, among other things, there was a KGB lub według investigative journalist Wojciech Sumliński (obtained information from Aleksander Lichocki) Father Popiełuszko may have been held in a Soviet pontoon battalion in Toruń. (Note: W Toruniu przy ulicy Grudziądzkiej stacjonował 902 samodzielny batalion pontonowy i 899 składnica amunicji i uzbrojenia lotniczego.).

On the night of October 25, 1984, Father Popiełuszko's body was thrown from a dam into the Vistula Lagoon in Włocławek, and was first unofficially recovered on October 26, 1984. Officially, the priest's body was recovered on October 30, 1984, and transported to the morgue of the Medical University of Białystok. According to Witkowski, renewed testimony from WSW soldiers could prove crucial to the investigation. However, the interrogation did not take place. In November 1991, he was removed from the case. His successor closed the investigation and referred the indictment against the generals to court. Ciastoń and Płatek, were ultimately acquitted. In 2000, Witkowski once again headed a group consisting of prosecutors and police officers. (Note: Jeszcze raz dokładnie przeanalizowano akta tzw. toruńskie. Wyszły m.in. kwestie: notatka przewodnika milicyjnego psa; znalezieni rybacy z miejscowej firmy połowowej Certa, którzy zeznali, że widzieli, jak wieczorem 25 października 1984 wrzucano z tamy do rzeki jakiś pakunek odpowiadający wielkością ludzkiemu ciału; kwestia czasu co się działo od 25 do 30 października 1984 r. Prokurator Witkowski wskazał, że z ustaleń, które poczynił prowadząc to śledztwo, wynika, że kpt. Piotrowski por. Leszek Pękala i por. Waldemar Chmielewski dokonali uprowadzenia księdza i przekazali go osobom podejrzanym o dokonanie morderstwa, udzielając im w ten sposób pomocy w popełnieniu zbrodni. Dopuszczając się tego czynu funkcjonariusze departamentu IV mieli świadomość, że ksiądz zostanie zabity przez tych, którym go przekazali, jeżeli nie zgodzi się na współpracę agenturalną. Ostatecznie to jednak Piotrowskiemu, Pękali i Chmielewskiemu przypisano role bezpośrednich wykonawców morderstwa, na co musieli przystać){{|group=uwaga}}. Witkowski's findings confirm the results of the police investigation conducted in 1984. A thorough examination of the Fiat used by Piotrowski and his group to kidnap Popiełuszko revealed no blood, sweat, or shoe prints in the trunk. This version remains a hypothesis. In February 2004, all of his arguments and evidence were rejected again. On October 13, 2004, the investigation was handed over to the prosecutor from IPN in Katowice, after which they ended up at the IPN in Warszaw.

In 2004, Krystyna Daszkiewicz professor of law and criminal law expert, once again pointed out in her publication Sprawa morderstwa księdza Jerzego Popiełuszki (The Murder of Father Jerzy Popiełuszko) that Father Popiełuszko was not brought to Kazun on October 19, because at that time he was lying dead in the Vistula Lagoon. It became necessary to reconsider these circumstances due to the spread of revelations about the alleged innocence of the perpetrators of the murder of Father Jerzy Popiełuszko. Kidnapped on October 19, 1984, he was allegedly taken over by other, hitherto unknown perpetrators, who transported him to Kazun, where they tortured him, finally killed him, took him to the dam, and disposed of his body there. Many circumstances established by the prosecutor's office and the courts indicate that the new version of the crime is untrue and even implausible. This is indicated not only by the explanations of those convicted of the crime by final judgments (“allegedly innocent”) and not only by material evidence, including the murder weapons used not by some “unknown other perpetrators” but by Grzegorz Piotrowski, Leszek Pękala, and Waldemar Chmielewski.

The Congregation for the Causes of Saints during the beatification process of Father Popiełuszko (the process was officially opened on February 8, 1997, at St. Stanislaus Kostka Church in Warsaw, and the diocesan stage of the process was completed exactly four years later, The proclamation of Father Jerzy Popiełuszko as blessed by the Catholic Church took place on June 6, 2010, in Warsaw on Piłsudski Square.) It considered October 19, 1984, to be the “unequivocal” date of death. The autopsy of Father Popiełuszko indicated that his death occurred before his body was thrown into the water. An important factor in determining the date of death was the analysis of the stomach contents, which showed that the digestive process must have stopped as a result of death before midnight on October 19, 1984.

=== Status as of 2024/2025 ===
The status of the case in October 2024 was as follows: the investigation into the kidnapping and murder of Father Jerzy Popiełuszko was conducted by prosecutor Mieczysław Góra from the Branch Commission for the Prosecution of Crimes against the Polish Nation in Institute of National Remembrance (In 2025, prosecutor Mieczysław Góra was a prosecutor for the Branch Commission for the Prosecution of Crimes against the Polish Nation in Gdańsk). Prosecutor Góra pointed out that, based on the evidence gathered, the circumstances surrounding Father Popiełuszko's death were as established during the investigation in 1984. In June 2025, Mieczysław Góra, prosecutor of the Branch Commission for the Prosecution of Crimes against the Polish Nation in Gdańsk, questioned the former head of the Management Board I (WSW/WSI) Colonel Aleksander Lichocki, retired.

== See also ==
- Assassination of Jerzy Popiełuszko
- Józef Glemp
- Ministry of Internal Affairs (Poland)
- Security Service (Poland)

== Bibliography ==
- Daszkiewicz, Krystyna (1990). Uprowadzenie i morderstwo Ks. Jerzego Popiełuszki. Poznań: Kantor Wydawniczy SAWW. p. 15; 29; 142. ISBN 83-85066-33-0.
- Aparat Represji w Polsce Ludowej 1944–1989 Rocznik IPN Nr 20 (2022): Portret Zbiorowy Funkcjonariuszy Komunistycznej Służby Bezpieczeństwa w Polsce odpowiedzialnych za porwanie i zabójstwo ks. Jerzego Popiełuszki (do roku 1984). Warszawa: Institute of National Remembrance – Commission for the Prosecution of Crimes against the Polish Nation. 2022. pp. 297, 298, 302–303, 304, 306–324, 307, 309, 310–324, 315, 319, 321, 324. ISSN 1733-6996.
- Daszkiewicz, Krystyna (2004). Sprawa morderstwa księdza Jerzego Popiełuszki raz jeszcze. Poznań: Harbor Point Sp. z o.o. Media Rodzina. p. 13; 23; 24; 35–36; 37; 66; 67; 80. ISBN 83-7278-132-X.
- Witkowski, Andrzej; Gromadzki, Ryszard (2022). Misja Popiełuszko. Kulisy śledztwa w sprawie porwania i morderstwa kapelana Solidarności. Warszawa: Capitol sp. z o.o. pp. 20, 33, 34, 36–37, 137. ISBN 978-83-66490-94-9.
- Sumliński, Wojciech (2024). Opowiem wam, jak zginął. Warszawa: WSR. p. 45. ISBN 978-83-972243-1-5.
- Witkowski, Andrzej (2023). Porwanie Księdza Księdza Popiełuszki. Warszawa: Bollinari Publishing HOuse Sp. z o.o. p. 128; 161-258; 258-263. ISBN 978-83-965551-0-6.
- Szymowski, Leszek (2016). Księżobójcy. Anatomia zbrodni: kto mordował?, kto krył?, kto nadal kryje zbrodniarzy?. Warszawa: Editions Spotkania. ISBN 9788379652129. OCLC 1035254926.
