= Janusz Krupski =

Polish historian and activist (1951–2010)

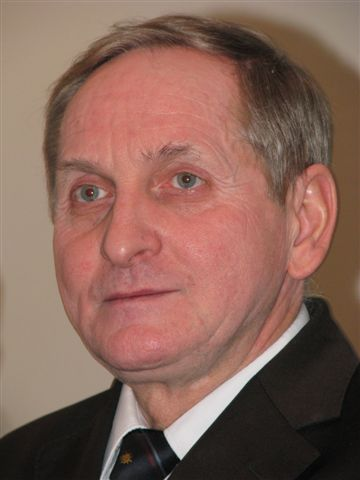
- Janusz Krupski

Minister of Combatants and Victims of Repression
- In office 19 May 2006 – 10 April 2010
- Succeeded by: Jan Ciechanowski

Personal details
- Born: 9 May 1951 Lublin, Poland
- Died: 10 April 2010 (aged 58) Smolensk, Russia
- Awards: Order of Polonia Restituta

Janusz Krupski (9 May 1951 – 10 April 2010) was a Polish historian, member of the democratic opposition to communist rule in Poland during the People's Republic of Poland and a government official.

== Studies and democratic opposition ==
Krupski acquired his degree in history at the Lublin Catholic University in 1975. While there he became friends with other future opposition leaders, such as Piotr Jegliński and Bogdan Borusewicz (who in 2010 briefly served as President of Poland, after the death of Lech Kaczynski in the same plane crash in which Krupski died). Between 1977 and 1988 he was the chief editor of the independent, non-censored, underground journal Spotkania ("Meetings"). Originally Krupski planned to steal a ditto machine from the Socialist Union of Polish Students office to print the journal, but eventually decided that that was too risky. Instead Jegliński managed to obtain the machine in Paris, while on a study trip; he worked at a Paris pizzeria to get the money for it. The printing machine (private ownership of which was illegal under communism) was smuggled back into Poland by shipping it with a theater troupe as supposedly a piece of a stage set. It was the first underground, privately owned oppositionist printing machine in post-World War II Poland. The first work printed on the machine was George Orwell's Animal Farm, also unavailable in communist Poland, although the quality of the material was so low due to the inexperience of Krupski and others that the copies had to be discarded. The students also used the printing machine to produce pamphlets outlining violations of human rights by the communist government in Poland which were then smuggled to the West.

While still a student, Janusz met his future wife, Joanna.

== Martial law and afterwards ==
In 1980 he joined the Solidarity movement, and served on the coordinating committee of its Gdańsk branch. During the state of martial law in Poland he was persecuted by the communist authorities. After ten months in hiding he was arrested and interned by the authorities in a special Internment Camp. His mother made numerous appeals for his release on his behalf (Janusz himself refused to make them) but they were turned down.

In 1983, with the end of martial law he was released. However, soon after he was seized by the communist secret police, the Służba Bezpieczeństwa (Security Services), taken to the Kampinos Forest and burned with a mixture of phenol and lysol. The perpetrators had actually been ordered by their commander, Cpt. Grzegorz Piotrowski (who was also responsible for the murder of Father Jerzy Popiełuszko), to have Krupski strip completely naked before the acid was dumped on him so that the mixture would burn through his skin, damage his internal organs and kill him. They were supposed to have had thrown his body into a nearby water reservoir afterward. However, the policemen had been in such a hurry that they only made him take off his jacket and boots and as a result, the thick sweater he was wearing prevented most of the damage, saving his life. After the fall of communism, in 1991, an investigation was launched into the kidnapping and some of those responsible were identified. Along with Piotrowski, the political crime was ordered by Bohdan Kuliński. Documents also showed that at the time Piotrowski wrote to the chief of the secret police, Czesław Kiszczak, informing him that "Krupski is still alive".

== In post communist Poland ==
After the fall of communism he was a member of a Sejm extraordinary committee charged with examining the effects and consequences of the martial law in Poland of the early 1980s. He was also the executive director of the publishing house "Krupski i S-ka" between 1993 and 2000. From 2000 until 2006 he was the vice-president of the Institute of National Remembrance (Polish: Instytut Pamięci Narodowej).

Krupski resumed editing the journal in post Communist Poland under a new title Editions: Spotkania in 1990 and continued to do so until 1992.

He died on 10 April 2010 in the 2010 Polish Air Force Tu-154 crash near Smolensk, Russia. On 16 April 2010 Krupski was decorated posthumously with the Grand Cross of the Order of Polonia Restituta. Ten days after the crash, he was buried in the Military Cemetery in Warsaw.

At the time of his death, Krupski was the director of the Department of Combatants and Victims of Repression (Polish:Urzad do Spraw Kombatantów i Osób Represjonowanych). He resided with his wife and seven children in Grodzisk Mazowiecki.
