= 1976 protests in Poland =

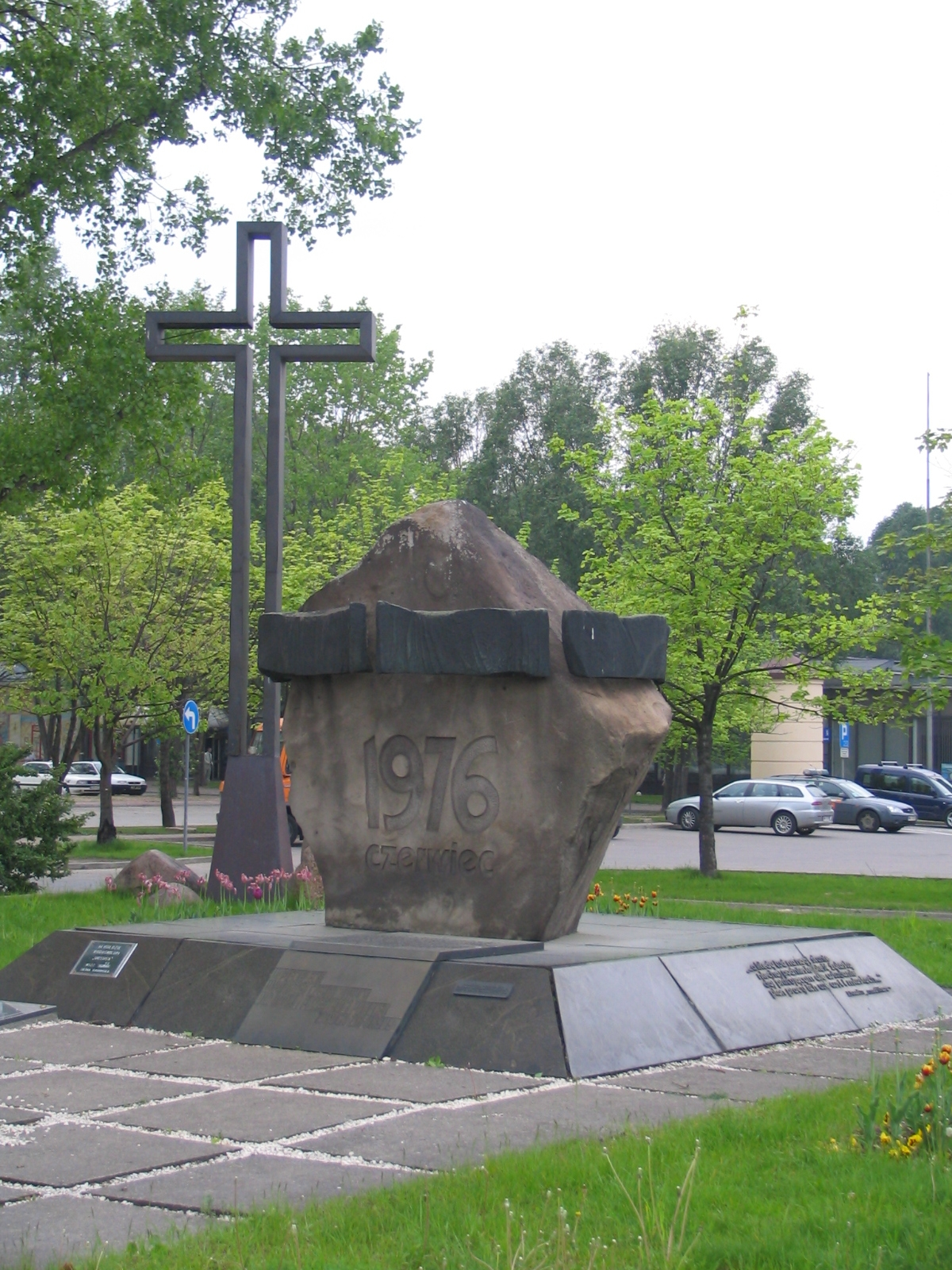
Monument to the June 1976 protests in Warsaw

The June 1976 protests were a series of protests and demonstrations in the Polish People's Republic that took place after Prime Minister Piotr Jaroszewicz revealed the plan for a sudden increase in the price of many basic commodities, particularly food (butter by 33%, meat by 70%, and sugar by 100%). Prices in Poland were at that time fixed, and controlled by the government, which was falling into increasing debt.

The protests started on 24 June and lasted until 30 June, the largest violent demonstrations and looting taking place in Płock, the Warsaw suburb of Ursus, and particularly Radom. The protests were brutally quelled by the government using tanks and helicopters, but the plan for the price increase was shelved; Polish leader Edward Gierek backed down and dismissed Prime Minister Jaroszewicz. This left the government looking both economically foolish and politically weak, a very dangerous combination. The 1976 disturbances and the subsequent arrests and dismissals of militant workers brought the workers and the intellectual opposition to the regime back into contact. In the aftermath, a group of intellectuals founded the opposition organization Workers' Defence Committee (Komitet Obrony Robotników, KOR), whose aim was to fight official repression of the protesting workers.

== Background ==
During the VII meeting of the Polish United Workers' Party (PZPR), in December 1975, secretary general Edward Gierek, recognizing the poor condition of the Polish economy, stated that "…the problems of structure of prices of basic food products needs further analysis". This utterance was an informal announcement of planned increase of food prices, which had artificially been kept at levels set in 1971, and whose increase was necessary for economic reasons. However, the Communist government of Poland wanted to prepare the citizens for the changes, and therefore a massive propaganda campaign was started in the mass-media. It is claimed that the government of the Soviet Union opposed the plans.

The purpose of the campaign was to show the nation that price increase was a necessary step, caused by similar trends in world markets. In early June 1976, Polish press, both national and local, began printing news about rising unemployment in Western Europe and North America, as well as rising food prices in the capitalist world. Sometimes, the news presented in Polish press was rather unusual, as when Trybuna Ludu announced that Iceland was handling a food crisis by switching to a fish diet, something that wasn't true. Also, Central Committee of the PZPR urged mass-media to avoid the phrase "price increase".

On 24 June 1976, prime minister Piotr Jaroszewicz gave a speech, which was broadcast live on TV. As advised by the party, he did not mention the increase directly. Instead, he talked about a continuation of the post-December 1970 policies. On the next day, a transcript of the speech was republished in newspapers, and on the same morning, strikes broke out. The propaganda announced the following increases, to be introduced on 27 June:

- meats, by 69%, with better meats by 110%,
- butter and cheeses by 50%,
- sugar by 100%,
- rice by 150%,
- vegetables by 30%.

The price increases were the result of policies of the government, which promoted the so-called "building of socialism", condoned by Edward Gierek. The increase in consumption, noted in the first half of the 1970s, was financed by credits from Western Europe, and party apparatchiks, who were not acquainted with economics, undertook several failed initiatives. Furthermore, the communist approach to the economy resulted in over-employment and low productivity. Also, close economic ties with Soviet Union resulted in Poland financing the Soviet arms race with the United States.

=== Operation Summer 76 ===
The government predicted that the increases would be answered by protests, so it secretly announced Operation Summer 76, headed by director of Security Services, General Boguslaw Stachura. In several cities, special investigative groups were created whose task was to find and incarcerate the most active demonstrators. Also, additional space was created in jails. On 23 June, the day before Jaroszewicz's speech, all police units participating in the operation were ordered to stay alert. Also, in mid-June, opposition activists (potential leaders of protests), were called up by the army for military exercises.

== Events in Radom ==
Of all the street demonstrations of the protest of June 1976, by far the biggest ones took place in central city of Radom. Altogether, some 20,000 people protested in the streets, resulting in a long fight with the police. Even though the government had predicted demonstrations, nobody considered Radom to be the center of them. Therefore, only 75 additional paramilitary police officers were dispatched to Radom, with larger forces concentrated in Warsaw, Kraków, Szczecin, Gdańsk, and Upper Silesia.

On 25 June, at 6:30 in the morning, workers of P-6 department of Radom's biggest factory — Metal Works "Łucznik" — decided to see the managing director of the factory. By 8:00, the crowd of around 1,000 left the shop, splitting in two groups. The biggest one went towards the main gate of the Factory of Heating Equipment (Zaklady Sprzetu Grzejnego), and the second group headed towards Radom Manufacturer of Leather "Radoskor". From both these factories, some 300 people decided to join the protest.

Meanwhile, an occupational strike was declared in nearby Factory of Equipment and Installation "Termowent". The demonstration, which quickly grew, headed towards the center of the city, walking past the gates of additional companies — Wood Manufacturer and Rolling Stock Maintenance Works ZNTK Radom. At about 10:00 a.m., the crowd, led by young men waving Polish flags, appeared in front of Radom Voivodeship's office of the PZPR. Fifteen minutes later, deputy Minister of Internal Affairs General Boguslaw Stachyra ordered transfer of ZOMO units from Łódź, Warszawa, Kielce and Lublin. Many of the young leaders of protests traveled by electric carts, and images of them later became symbols of the events.

By 11:00, some 4,000 people gathered in front of the office, demanding talks with party decision-makers. Slogans, such as "We are hungry", "We want bread and freedom", "Down with the increase", were chanted, as well as the Polish national anthem. Initially, the First Secretary of Radom's Committee, Janusz Prokopiak, who went outside to see the people, declared that he "would not talk to mob". In response, the angry crowd undressed him, leaving only his underpants. Only then did Prokopiak agree to call the Secretary of Central Committee, Jan Szydlak, who announced that the increase would not be canceled. However Prokopiak, who was aware of the anger of the crowd, decided to buy some time, telling the demonstrators to wait until 14:00 for decision.

After more than three hours of waiting, the anxious crowd broke into the PZPR office, which had been evacuated a few minutes before. First they ransacked the cafeteria, where they found several cans of ham (a good inaccessible to ordinary citizens). Then the destruction of the building began. Portraits of Vladimir Lenin were thrown out through the windows, and a red flag disappeared from the roof, replaced by a white and red Polish banner. The office was set on fire, and surrounding streets were barricaded, to prevent fire engines accessing the burning building. Demonstrators threw TV sets, carpets, and pieces of furniture through the windows. Cars parked in front of the complex were burned.

Street fights that ensued after the storm of the party's office lasted until 21:00. Since the government did not predict Radom to be the center of the demonstrations, police had inadequate forces, so reinforcements were brought. The first extra ZOMO units appeared on the streets at 15:10, soon others followed. By 16:00, around 20,000 people fought 1543 police officers, who used live ammunition, water cannons and tear gas, and finally announced a state of emergency. The demonstrators used rocks, bottles, and bricks. Some of them wielded axes, taken from firefighters. To disorient the ZOMO, large quantities of old clothes were set on fire on the streets of the city. That evening, the protesters tried to capture headquarters of city police, but their attack was repelled. As well as the Communist party office, fire was set to the local Passport Office.

The clashes were very violent, with three deaths — Jan Labecki, Jan Brozyna and Tadeusz Zabecki. There were 198 wounded, and the police, commanded by deputy chief of the country, General Stanislaw Zaczkowski, who was hurriedly transported to Radom, arrested 634 demonstrators. On the next day, 939 people were sacked. Material losses were estimated at 77 million złotys, with 5 trucks and 19 passenger cars burned, as well as party office partially burned. Many shops had been looted. On 18 August 1976, a Roman Catholic priest, Father Roman Kotlarz, died after being beaten by the secret services because he had joined the demonstrators, blessing them and later criticizing the government in his sermons.

== Events in Ursus ==
Warsaw's suburb of Ursus, with its large tractor plant, became another major center of protests. Here, events were not so heated as in Radom, still, there were some notable moments. The most famous one took place when desperate workers of the Ursus Factory destroyed a main railway track, which stopped rail traffic.

The Ursus strike began on 25 June in the morning, and it was joined by some 90% of the workforce. Laborers went to the main office, but in response, the management urged them to return to work. Then, around 1000 people decided to head towards nearby railroad junction, which connected Warsaw with other major cities, such as Łódź, Poznań, Katowice and Kraków (this line is part of the major European route Paris–Moscow). The demonstrators sat on the track, stopping traffic. Soon afterwards, part of the line was destroyed, and blocked by an engine. Police units appeared on the spot at around 21:30, when the crowd had dispersed to several hundred. A short skirmish ensued, with most active participants beaten and arrested. Altogether, 131 people were detained.

== Events in Plock ==
In Plock, the third center of demonstrations, the strike broke out in one of the biggest Polish companies, Masovian Refinery and Petrochemical Plant (now PKN Orlen). The workers formed a demonstration, and at about 14:00, they appeared in front of the Płock Voivodeship's office of the PZPR. Three hours later the crowd numbered around 3000, but workers of other local factories did not join the protest. A party official gave a speech, and in the evening of that day, street fights began, with the demonstrators throwing rocks, and destroying a fire truck. The government brought reinforcements, and by 21:00, the clashes ended.

== Events in other cities ==
Apart from Radom, Ursus and Plock, there were strikes and street demonstrations in several other cities, such as Gdansk, Elbląg, Grudziądz, Poznań, Radomsko, Starachowice, Szczecin, Warsaw and Wrocław. Altogether, in June 1976, up to 70000 workers of 90 factories across Poland went on strike. Other sources put the number of strikers at 80000, in 112 factories. In Warsaw proper, even though no demonstrations were recorded, several major factories, such as FSO Warszawa, Radio Works of Marcin Kasprzak went on a short strike. In Łódź, there were stoppages in 16 plants.

== Aftermath ==
Initially, the government suppressed all news about riots, and after a few days, they were described as "insignificant hooligan actions". Pacification of the demonstrations was very brutal, with hundreds of beaten workers, several of whom were later hospitalized. In Radom, 42 people were sent to prison, with sentences ranging from 2 to 10 years. In Ursus, 7 people were sentenced to up to 5 years, and, in Płock, 18 people were sentenced. The rule used by the police in Radom was simple — all those persons whose hands were dirty, were treated as demonstrators and detained.

The June 1976 events for the first time brought together workers and the Polish intellectual opposition. The intellectuals, shaken by the plight of the helpless demonstrators, decided to help them legally as well as materially, since many people were dismissed and had no means to support their families. Three months later, on 23 September, Komitet Obrony Robotników (Committee for the Defense of the Workers, KOR) was created by Jacek Kuron and Jerzy Andrzejewski. Also, in early September 1976, General Conference of Polish Episcopate urged the government to stop all repressions and make it possible for fired workers to return to their workplaces. KOR activists kept a list of 604 families from Radom, Płock, Ursus, Łódź, Grudziądz, Poznań and Gdańsk, who needed help. Money was collected not only in Poland, but also by trade union members in France, Norway, Sweden and Italy, as well as Polonia. In July 1977, after an amnesty, all incarcerated workers were freed.

Even though the demonstrations were quickly suppressed, the government overall lost. In late June 1976, party propaganda organized mass demonstrations in major stadiums, during which "anti-hooligan" slogans were chanted. Nevertheless, price increases were recalled, supposedly by order of Moscow, since the Soviet government did not wish any more disturbances in Poland.

== See also ==
- Poznań 1956 protests
- Polish 1970 protests
- Jastrzębie-Zdrój 1980 strikes
