= Zenon Płatek =

Polish police officer (1927–2009)

- Born: 6 September 1927; Jaksice, Poland
- Died: 20 June 2009 (aged 81) Warsaw, Poland
- Allegiance: Security Service
- Branch: Ministry of Internal Affairs
- Service years: 1948–1990

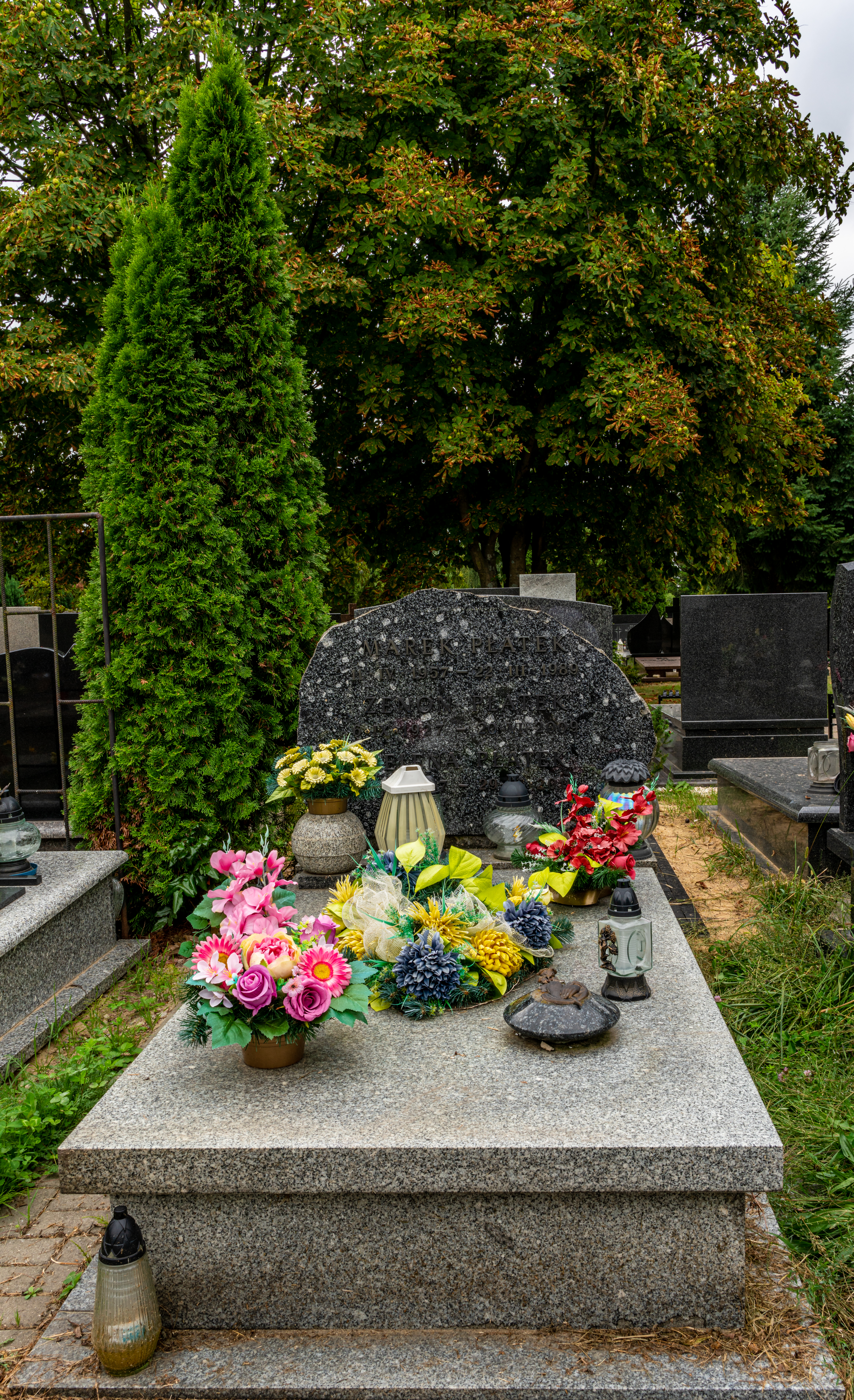
The grave of Zenon Płatek at the North Municipal Cemetery in Warsaw

Zenon Jan Płatek (6 September 1927 in Jaksice – 20 June 2009 in Warsaw) was a Brigadier General of the Milicja Obywatelska.

== Early life and education ==
Płatek was the son of Jan and Anna. Between May 1948 and September 1949, he graduated from the Internal Security Corps non-commissioned officer school. From November 1953, he worked at the Ministry of Public Security in Rzeszów. In July 1959, he graduated from the Annual Professional Officer School of the Security Service at the CW MSW in Legionowo.

== Career ==
From 1 March 1968 to 30 September 1970, he was deputy head of Department IV of the Milicja Obywatelska in Rzeszów, and from 1 October 1970 to 31 July 1974, Płatek was its head. From 19 November 1973 to June 1976, he was the head of Independent Group "D" of Department IV of the Ministry of Internal Affairs, which dealt with the disintegration of the Catholic Church in Poland, head of Department I of Department IV of the Ministry of Internal Affairs (Catholic Church leadership) from 1 February 1976 to April 1979, deputy director of Department IV of the Ministry of Internal Affairs from 20 April 1979 to 16 December 1981, director of Department IV of the Ministry of Internal Affairs from 16 December 1981 to 30 October 1984. In 1983, he was appointed brigadier general

To this day, Zenon Płatek's connection to the assassination attempt on Pope John Paul II remains unclear. In April 1979, Płatek traveled to Vienna to meet with his secret collaborator in the Security Service, codenamed Tango, as part of a top-secret operation codenamed Triangolo. At the same time, Turkish terrorist Mehmet Ali Ağca was also in Vienna.

On 2 November 1984, Płatek was suspended from his duties in connection with the murder of Father Jerzy Popiełuszko. He was appointed resident of the Ministry of Internal Affairs, formally head of Operational Group No. 5 "Praga" at the Polish People's Republic embassy in Prague (1986–1990). In 1985–1989, he served as deputy director of Department V of the Ministry of Internal Affairs. In November 1989, he was appointed deputy director of the Department of Economic Protection of the Ministry of Internal Affairs, a position he held until March 1990. In October 1990, he was arrested together with General Władysław Ciastoni and charged with masterminding the murder of Father Jerzy Popiełuszko. He was acquitted by the court.

== Orders and decorations ==
- Commander's Cross of the Order of Polonia Restituta (1984)
- Officer's Cross of the Order of Polonia Restituta
- Knight's Cross of the Order of Polonia Restituta,
- Silver Cross of Merit
- Medal of the 30th Anniversary of People's Poland
- Silver Badge "For Merit in the Protection of Public Order"
- Bronze Badge "For Merit in the Protection of Public Order"
- Badge "20 Years in the Service of the Nation"
- Janek Krasicki Silver Medal
- Badge "10 Years in the Service of the Nation"
- Gold Badge "In the Service of the Nation"
- Gold Badge "For Merit in the Protection of Public Order"
- Badge of Merit for the Rzeszów Province
- Special ORMO Badge
- Medal "For Strengthening of Brotherhood in Arms"

== Bibliography ==
- Piotrowski, Paweł (2006), * Paweł Piotrowski (ed.), Aparat bezpieczeństwa w Polsce. Kadra kierownicza, Warszawa: Instytut Pamięci Narodowej, ISBN 9788360464243, OCLC 169865709, t. II 1956-1975
- Piotrowski, Paweł (2008), * Paweł Piotrowski (ed.), Aparat bezpieczeństwa w Polsce. Kadra kierownicza, Warszawa: Instytut Pamięci Narodowej, ISBN 9788360464809, OCLC 644348185, t. III 1975–1990
