= Ryszard Matejewski =

Polish politician (1923–2021)

- Born: 8 November 1923; Włocławek, Second Polish Republic
- Died: 20 August 2021 (aged 97); Warsaw, Poland
- Burial place: Orthodox Cemetery, Warsaw
- Military career
- Allegiance: Polish People's Republic
- Branch: Milicja Obywatelska
- Service years: 1945-1971
- Rank: Generał brygady (Brigadier general)
- Units: Ministry of Public Security; Public Safety Committee; Security Service
- Commands: Director of Security Service; Undersecretary of State at the Ministry of Internal Affairs
- Awards
- Other work: vesicle

Ryszard Stanisław Matejewski (November 8, 1923 - August 20, 2021) was a brigadier general of the Security Service, deputy minister of internal affairs of the Polish People's Republic.

== Biography ==
He was the son of Stanisław and Józefa. Until the outbreak of the war in 1939 he finished three grades of Mechanical High School in Włocławek. At the end of the war he joined the Polish Workers' Party, and then was a member of the Polish United Workers' Party from which he was expelled in 1971.

From 1 October 1945 he was a clerk in the Provincial Office of Public Security in Bydgoszcz. In 1946 he completed the course in the Officers' School of the Ministry of Public Security in Legionowo, after which he worked in the 3rd Department of the Ministry of Public Security until 1952.

From 1 September 1953 to 1 July 1954 he was the head of the Provincial Office of Public Security in Gdańsk. From 1954 he was a deputy director of the Investigation Department and from 1956 director of the 2nd counterintelligence department in the Ministry of Public Security. In 1965 he was appointed general director for the Security Service. In 1967, he participated in the investigation against the DIA spy Jerzy Strawa, who was sentenced to death by firing squad by the Polish People's Republic military court. Thanks to his participation in the Jerzy Strawa case, he became Undersecretary of State supervising the work of counterintelligence. He held this position in years 1969–1971.

He was the leader of an illegal Security Service robbery group that acquired gold and foreign currency for the needs of current operational activities. During this operation, he embezzled property of Security Service for his own use. This case was named "Zalew" ("Reservoir") after the place where the valuables were hidden, which was on plots of land by the Zegrze Reservoir. After the illegal activities were revealed, he was stripped of all state functions and arrested on 13 June 1971, after a several-week investigation. On 15 February 1972, he was sentenced to 12 years in prison. He was released after 6 years due to a pardon. He later worked in a leather goods cooperative, making watch straps.

He died on August 20, 2021, and was buried in the Orthodox cemetery in Warsaw.

== Awards and decorations ==
- Order of the Banner of Labour, 1st Class (1969)
- Commander's Cross of the Order of Polonia Restituta (1959)
- Knight's Cross of the Order of Polonia Restituta (1954)
- Gold Cross of Merit
- Silver Cross of Merit (twice, 1946 and 1947)
- Medal of the 10th Anniversary of People's Poland
- Silver Badge "In the Service of the Nation"
- Bronze Badge "In the Service of the Nation"

== Bibliography ==
- Aparat bezpieczeństwa w województwie gdańskim w latach 1945–1990, Instytut Pamięci Narodowej Gdańsk 2010
- Aparat Bezpieczeństwa w Polsce. Kadra kierownicza. Tom II 1956–1975, IPN Warszawa 2006, 208 s., ISBN 83-60464-24-3.
- Biogram w IPN, https://katalog.bip.ipn.gov.pl/informacje/37955
