= Władysław Ciastoń =

Polish state official (1924–2021)

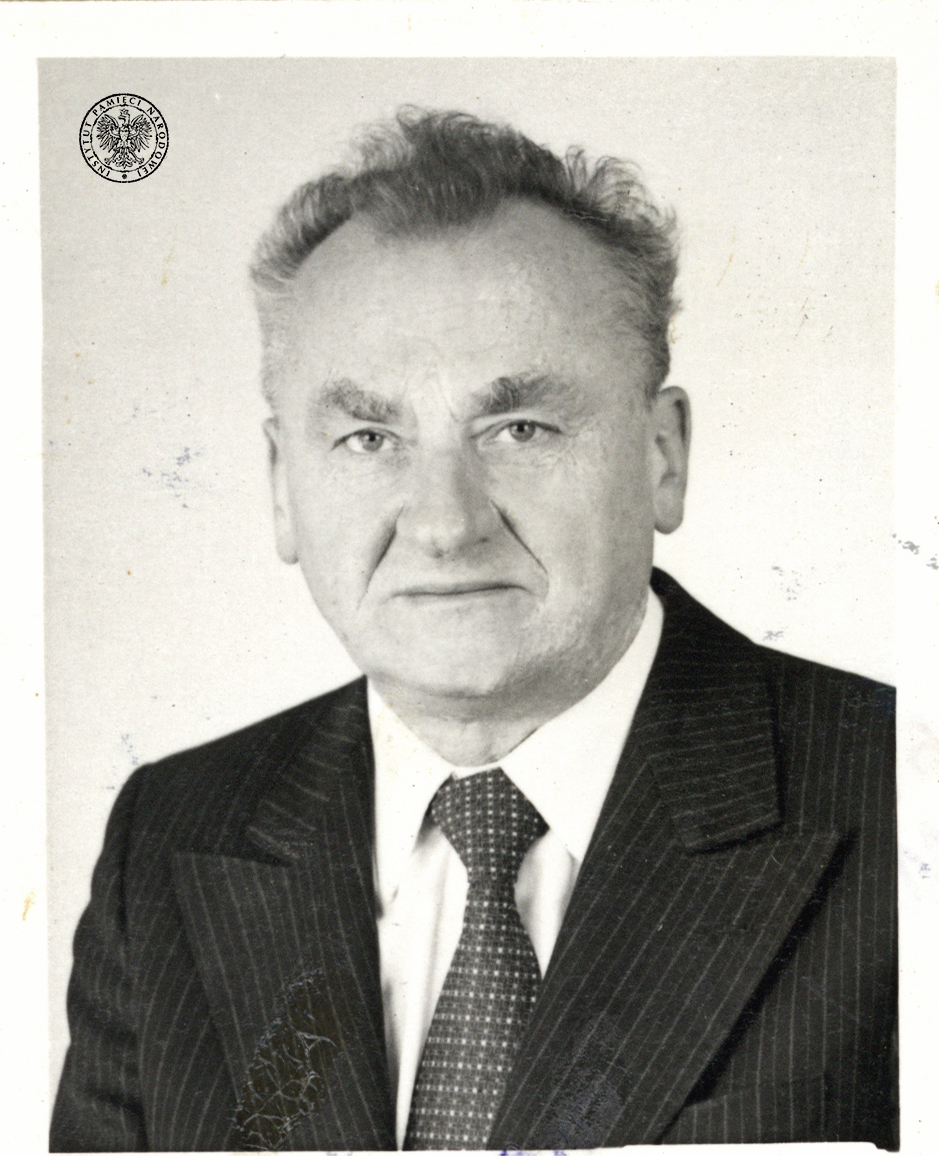
- Władysław Ciastoń

head of the Security Service
- In office 25 November 1981 – 19 December 1986
- Preceded by: Bogusław Stachura
- Succeeded by: Henryk Dankowski

Personal details
- Born: 16 December 1924 Kraków, Second Polish Republic
- Died: 4 June 2021 (aged 96) Warsaw, Poland
- Party: Polish United Workers' Party
- Occupation: Ambassador of the Polish People's Republic in Tirana
- Awards

Military service
- Allegiance: Polish People's Republic
- Branch/service: Security Service
- Years of service: 1945-1958, 1971-1987
- Rank: Major General

Władysław Ciastoń (16 December 1924 – 4 June 2021) was a Polish state official. A member of the Polish Workers' Party (PPR) and Polish United Workers' Party (PZPR), he served as Major General of Milicja Obywatelska and Deputy Minister of Internal Affairs. He also worked for the Ministry of Public Security and was Ambassador of Poland to Albania.

== Biography ==
Ciastoń was acting head of the Ministry of Public Security in Wrocław and Bolesławiec from 1947 to 1949. He also directed Department IV of the Committee of Public Security from March to November 1956. From 1959 to 1971, he worked in the mathematical department at the Polish Academy of Sciences. He was Director of the Security Service from 1981 to 1987 and was Deputy Minister of Internal Affairs from 1981 to 1987. In 1983, he was appointed Major General of Milicja Obywatelska.

In 1984, Ciastoń was a suspect in the murder of Father Jerzy Popiełuszko. He was arrested on 8 December 1984, but was acquitted thanks to intervention from the communist regime. Following the end of his ministerial term, he served as Ambassador of Poland in Tirana from 1987 to 1990. However, he was again arrested for Popiełuszko's murder on 8 October 1990 along with Zenon Płatek. He was acquitted for lack of evidence in 1994.

In 2019, Ciastoń was charged with suppressing the opposition in 1982 by unlawfully drafting them into the military. He was sentenced to two years in prison.

Władysław Ciastoń died in Warsaw on 4 June 2021 at the age of 96. On 14 June, he was buried at the Powązki Military Cemetery.

== Awards and decorations ==
- Order of the Banner of Labour, 1st Class
- Officer's Cross of Order of Polonia Restituta
- Golden Cross of Merit (two times)
- Medal "For participation in the fights in defense of the people's power"
- Bronze Cross of Merit
- Golden Medal of Merit for National Defence
- Silver Medal of Merit for National Defence
- Medal of the 30th Anniversary of People's Poland
- Medal of the 40th Anniversary of People's Poland
- Medal of the 10th Anniversary of People's Poland
- Golden Badge "For merits in the protection of public order"
- Silver Badge "For merits in the protection of public order"
- Bronze Badge "For merits in the protection of public order"
- Golden Badge "In the Service of the Nation"
- Order of Friendship of Peoples (USSR)

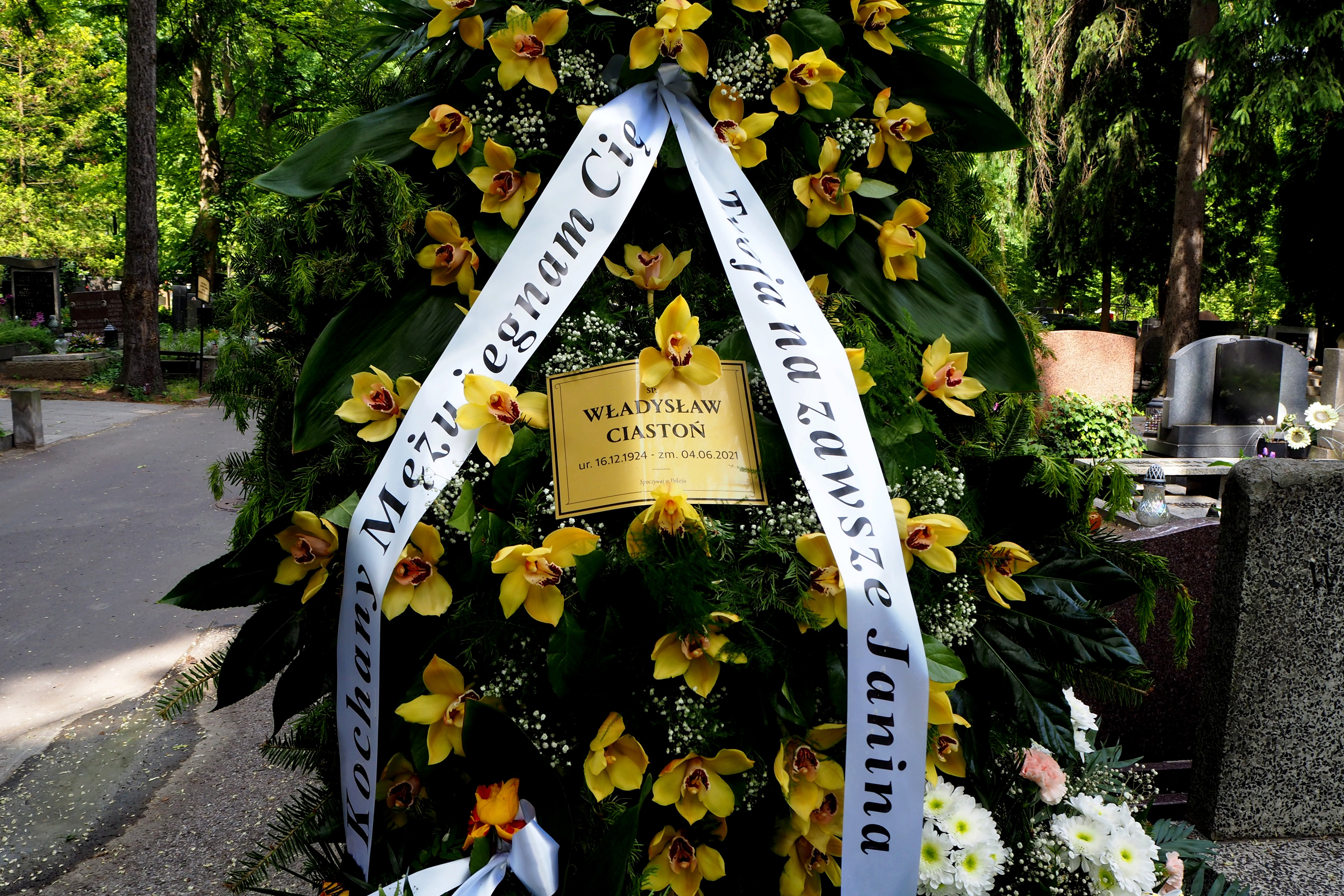
Grave of Ciastoń in Warsaw
