= Krystyna Daszkiewicz =

Polish law professor (1924–2025)

- Born: 12 March 1924; Toruń, Second Polish Republic
- Died: 17 February 2025 (aged 100); Poznań, Poland
- Occupation: Law Professor
- Known for: observation of the Toruń trial regarding the assassination

Krystyna Daszkiewicz (12 March 1924 – 17 February 2025) was a Polish law professor, criminalist and psychologist.

== Personal life ==
The daughter of a Greater Poland insurgent and participant of the Polish-Bolshevik war. During World War II, during the German occupation, she was held in a "transition camp" at Łorzeńska Street in Toruń. From 1941 she lived in the General Government, where she was deported together with her parents. She studied at the Junior High School named after Adam Czartoryski as part of secret teaching. She was active in the Home Army from 1942 to 1945. At the end of the war, she served in the ranks of the Home Army partisan unit under the command of "Lechita". Before the entry of the Red Army (with the arrival of the Eastern Front) in 1944, it was involved in the creation of the Polish administration in Kazimierz Dolny. After the war, she passed the secondary school leaving examination at the Secondary School named after Stefan Żeromski in Toruń. She started her studies in law at the Faculty of Law of the Nicolaus Copernicus University in Toruń. During her studies, she was successful in law students' oratorical competitions and became an assistant at the Department of Criminal Law of the Nicolaus Copernicus University in the fourth year of her studies. In 1951 she defended her doctorate. After the Faculty of Law at the Toruń University was closed, she moved to the Faculty of Law of the Adam Mickiewicz University in Poznań, where she was a junior assistant, a senior assistant and an adjunct professor. In 1959 she became an associate professor, in 1971 she obtained the title of associate professor, and in 1977 the title of full professor. During martial law in 1981–1983, she was a defense attorney in lawsuits involving students and university employees. She published in the magazine "Palestra".

The main topics of Krystyna Daszkiewicz's scientific work were: criminal law, social pathology, criminal liability for German war crimes and crimes against humanity, crimes of totalitarian regimes, abuse of power, issues of criminal law reform in Poland, the case of the abduction and murder of priest Jerzy Popiełuszko (she was an observer of the entire trial of the priest's murderers conducted in Toruń and Warsaw).

Her husband was prof. conv. Dr. hab. Wiesław Daszkiewicz, also a researcher at Adam Mickiewicz University (1927–2013), with whom she had two sons: Paweł (doctor, director of the Karol Jonscher Clinical Hospital in Poznań) and Piotr.

== Publications ==
- Threat in Polish criminal law (1958)
- Criminal law. Script (1961)
- Outline of the legal system of the GDR (1963)
- Premeditated Crimes (1968)
- Statute of limitations for war crimes and crimes against humanity in the criminal law of the Federal Republic of Germany. On the role and function of § 50 section paragraph 2 of the Penal Code Penal Code of 1871 (1970)
- Climate of Lawlessness (1971)
- Nazi crimes in the criminal law of the German Federal Republic (1972)
- Behind the scenes of the crime (1974)
- Treatise on Bad Jobs (1974)
- Extraordinary leniency in the Polish Penal Code (1976)
- Przestępstwa z afektu w polskim prawie karnym (1982)
- Abduction and murder of Fr. Jerzy Popiełuszko (1990)
- Behind the scenes of the crime. Tenth year since the murder of Fr. Jerzy Popiełuszko (1994)
- Closed Chapter (1998)
- Death of Father Jerzy Popiełuszko (2000)
- Crimes against life and health - Chapter XIX of the Penal Code. Commentary (2000)
- Crimes against life and health – commentary (2000)
- Penal Code of 1997 – critical remarks (2001)
- The murder case of Fr. Jerzy Popiełuszko once again (2004)
- German Genocide against the Polish Nation 1939–1945 (2009)

== Decorations and awards ==
=== Decorations ===
- Commander's Cross with Star of the Order of Polonia Restituta (November 6, 2008, by resolution of the President of the Republic of Poland, Lech Kaczyński, "for outstanding services to the Republic of Poland, for activities in favor of democratic changes, for achievements in undertaking professional work and social activities for the benefit of the country")
- Knight's Cross of the Order of Polonia Restituta

=== Awards ===
- Award of the Józef Piłsudski Institute in America
- Award of the Ministry of Education – twice
- Departmental Award of the Ministry of Justice (for overall activity)
- Award named after Jerzy Łojek (2004, awarded by the Łojek Foundation at the Józef Piłsudski Institute in America for the book "The Case of the Murder of Father Jerzy Popiełuszko Once Again")
- Title of "Merit for the city of Poznań" (May 13, 2008)
- Homini Vere Academico Medal (2017)
