= Roman Kotlarz =

Polish priest and activist

- Born: October 17, 1928; Koniemłoty
- Died: August 18, 1976 (aged 47); Radom, Poland
- Parent(s): Stephen and Valerie

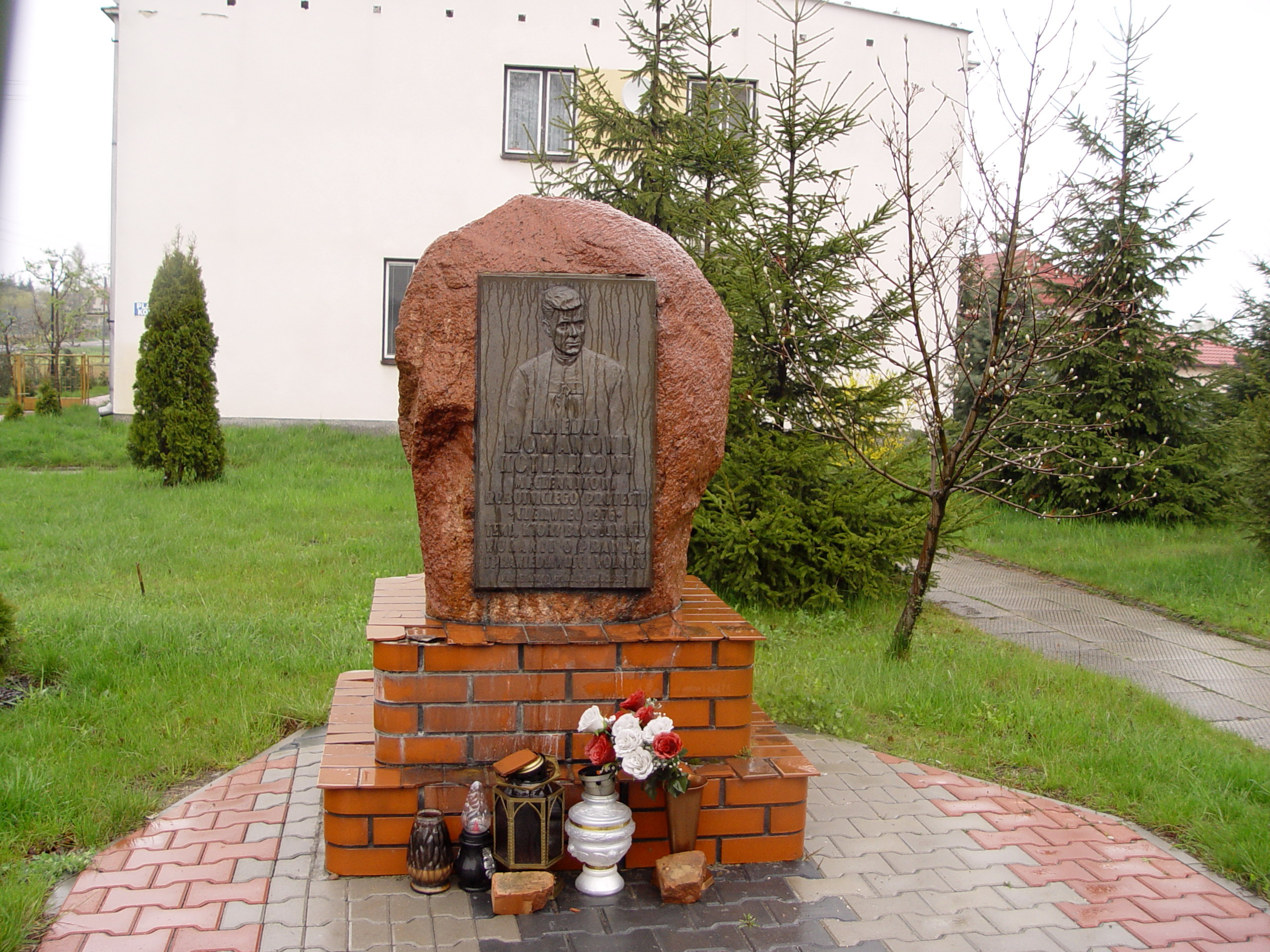
Plaque in Koniemłot

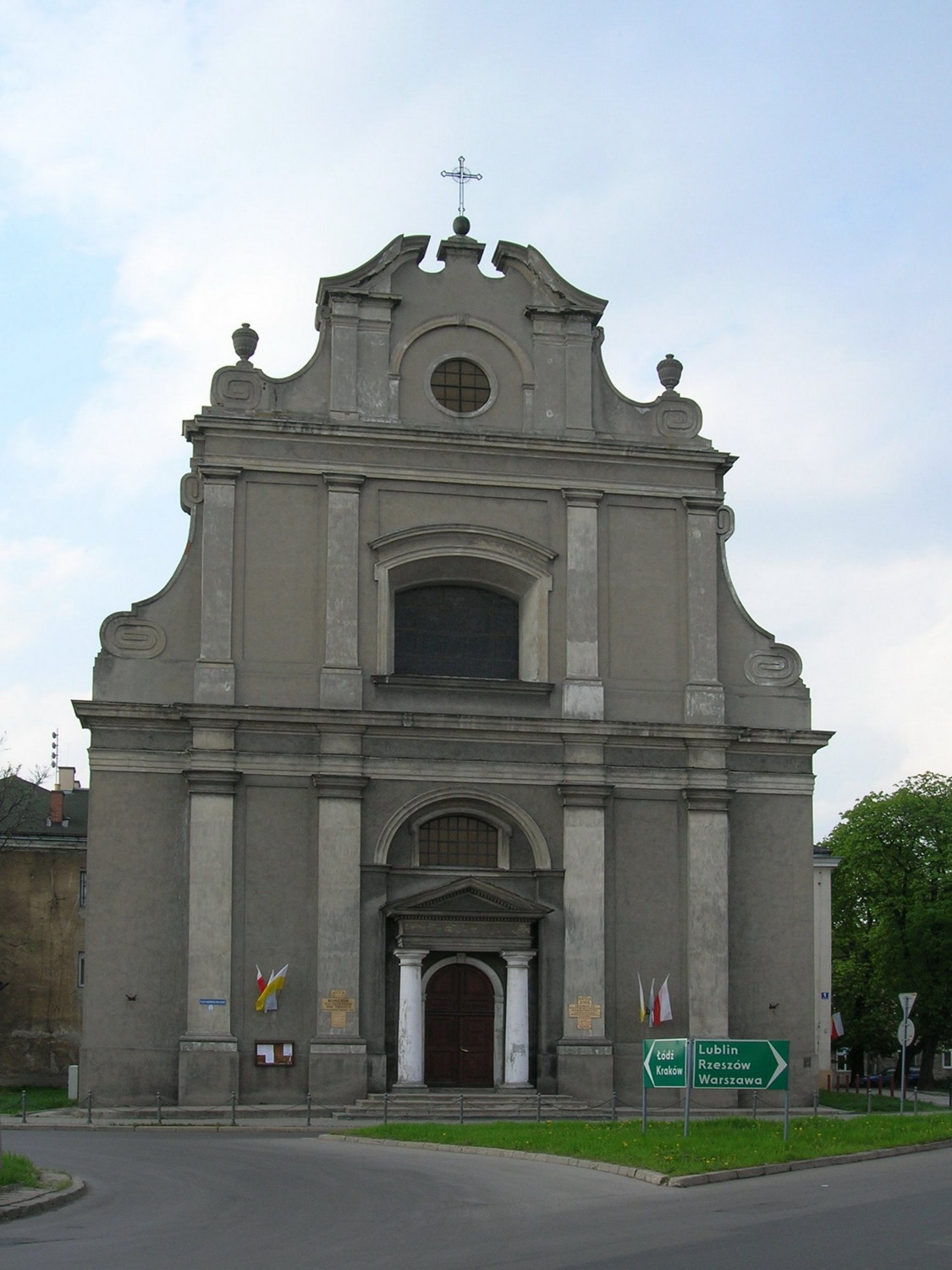
Holy Trinity Church in Radom, where Kotlarz blessed protesting workers on the church steps in 1976.

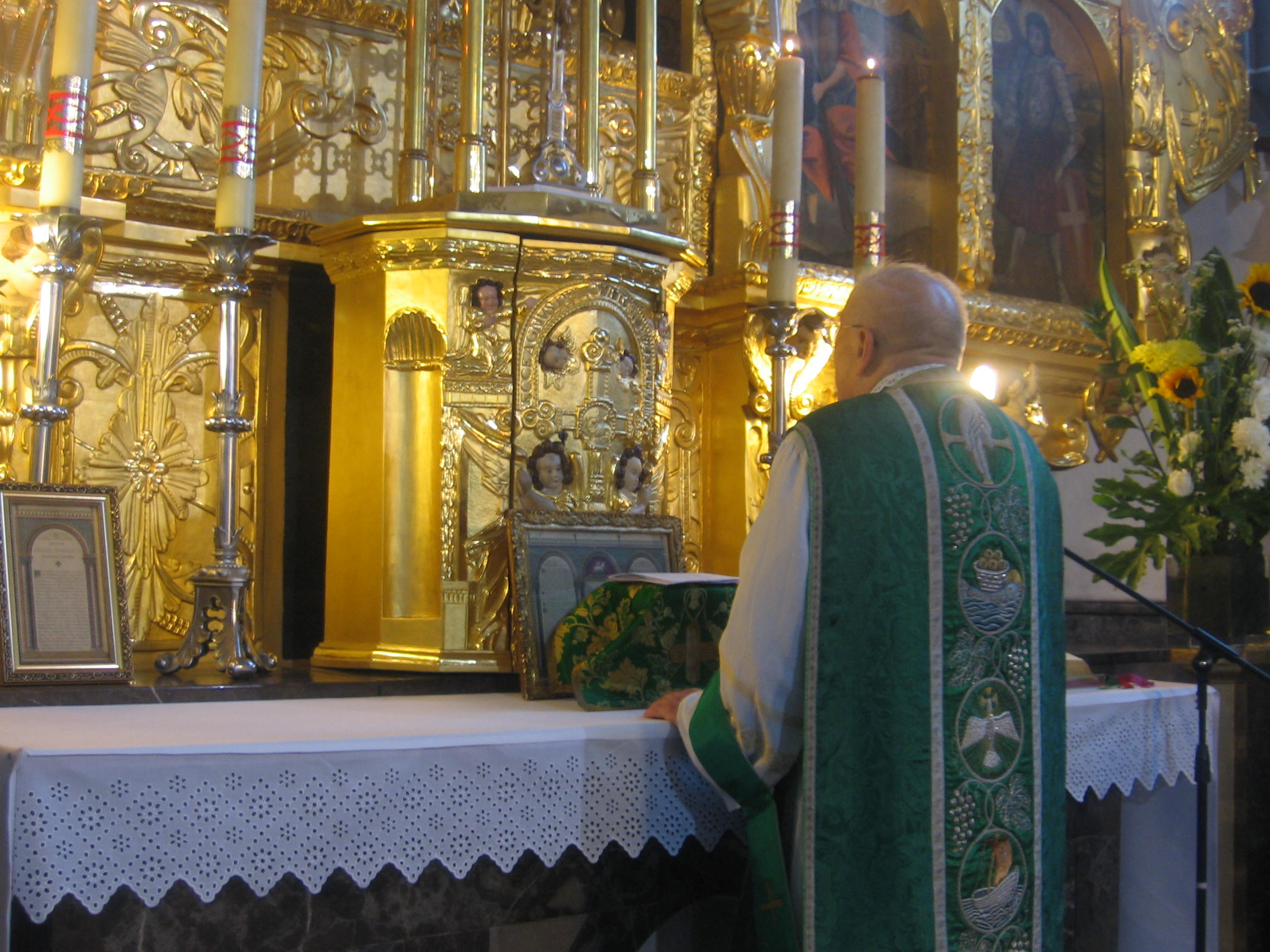
A mass at St Sigismund's Church, Szydlowiec in 2008

Roman Kotlarz (born 17 October 1928 in Koniemłoty near Staszow, died 18 August 1976 in Radom, Poland) was a Polish Catholic priest and an activist of the democratic opposition in the days of Polish communism and the People’s Republic of Poland (PRP). During the June 1976 protests in Poland he gave a blessing and support to the striking workers and protesters. He was beaten severely by police on several occasions. He died under mysterious circumstances later that year. He was honored posthumously by many leaders including president Lech Kaczyński.

== Biography ==
He was born in Koniemłoty near Staszów, as the youngest of six children to Szczepan and Waleria. After finishing elementary school he attended high school in Staszów. After graduating he entered the seminary. He was ordained May 30, 1954. He was vicar in the parishes of: Szydłowiec, Żarnów, Koprzywnica, Mirzec, Kunów and Nowa Słupia. From 26 August 1961 he was the pastor of the parish Lady of Czestochowa in Pelagowie near Radom.

He was under constant observation of the surveillance officers and secret collaborators of Służba Bezpieczeństwa, the PRP's Secret Police.

During the June 1976 protests he supported the strikers at Metal Works "Bowman" in Radom. He was also at the Holy Trinity Church in Radom blessing protesting workers during demonstrations. After the brutal suppression of the protesters by the troops he prayed together with the faithful for the beaten, arrested and fired workers. In his sermons he demanded respect for the human being, and denounced falsehood and injustice.

He was subjected to repression by the communist authorities. On several occasions, was brutally beaten by officers of the Służba Bezpieczeństwa. According to Jan Jozef Lipski, a cleaning woman found him beaten unconscious in his own apartment. She told the Regional Psychiatric Hospital Health Care in Krychnowice, but he was declared dead on arrival.

The communist authorities banned the priest from being buried in the cemetery of Radom. His funeral, held on 20 August 1976, turned into a patriotic manifestation. He is buried in Koniemłoty.

In 1990, the president of Poland in exile, Ryszard Kaczorowski, posthumously honored him with Cross of Merit with Swords for "sacrifice of life in the struggle with the Communists for an independent Poland."

On 3 May 2009 he was posthumously awarded by President Lech Kaczyński's Commander's Cross with Star of the Order of Polonia Restituta.
