= Security Service (Poland) =

Secret police agency of Communist Poland (1956–1989)

- Służba Bezpieczeństwa
- Coat of Arms of the Polish People's Republic used by the UB and SB

Agency overview
- Formed: 1956
- Preceding agency: Committee for Public Security
- Dissolved: 1990
- Superseding agency: Office of State Protection
- Type: Secret police, intelligence agency
- Jurisdiction: Polish People's Republic
- Headquarters: Warsaw
- Employees: 24,300 (1989)
- Agency executives: Władysław Wicha (1956-1964), First Director; Jerzy Karpacz (1989), Last Director
- Parent agency: Ministry of Internal Affairs

The Security Service (Polish: Służba Bezpieczeństwa; Polish pronunciation: [ˈswuʐba bɛspʲeˈt͡ʂɛɲstfa]), in full Security Service of the Ministry of Internal Affairs and commonly known as SB, was a secret police force established in the Polish People's Republic in 1956 as a successor to the Ministry of Public Security (UB). The SB was the chief foreign and domestic security organization in Poland from 1956 until the fall of communism in 1989.

The parent agency of SB, the Ministry of Internal Affairs, had been established in 1954, but the Ministry did not play a significant role until the winding-up of the Committee for Public Safety in 1956.

== History ==
The post-World War II Ministry of Public Security (UB) was responsible for security, intelligence and counterintelligence. It controlled over 41,000 soldiers of the Internal Security Corps, 57,500 members of the Citizens' Militia, 32,000 Border Protection Forces, 10,000 prison officers and 125,000 members of the Volunteer Reserve Citizen Militia.

After the 1954 defection to the West of Józef Światło (born Izaak Fleischfarb), a high-ranking Ministry of Public Security officer instrumental in arresting Cardinal Stefan Wyszyński, this Ministry of Public Security was abolished.

In December 1954, the Communist Party divided the old UB into two parts: the Committee for Public Security (Komitet do spraw Bezpieczeństwa Publicznego, or KDSBP) and the Ministry of Internal Affairs (MSW). The former was a secret police responsible for internal and external intelligence and counterintelligence to fight underground movements and the influence of the Catholic Church. The MSW was responsible for administrative duties, and eventually controlled the Internal Security Corps, militia, border troops, prison guards and the Volunteer Reserve Citizen Militia.

=== 1956 reform ===
The year 1956 brought change to Polish politics. Recently released from prison, Władysław Gomułka became the first secretary of the Central Committee of the Polish United Workers' Party. Reforms were made in the structure of state security. The Committee of Public Safety was abolished, and its duties were taken over by the MSW.

The introduction of Security Service to the Interior Ministry (which was already in the Polish public safety system since 1954), came as a result of directive number 00238/56 made by Władysław Wicha on 29 November 1956. Wicha was a Polish communist and politician PZPR member and then the first Minister of Internal Affairs from 1954 to 1964. After that his directive, the MSW was the only security body in Poland.

Officers working in the Security Service were nicknamed "SB-eks" (Służba Bezpieczeństwa agents). SB also contracted individuals as secret collaborators (Tajny Współpracownik or TW), who usually received money for the services rendered.

== Directors ==
- Władysław Wicha (1956–1964)
- Mieczysław Moczar (1964–1965)
- Ryszard Matejewski (1965–1969)
- Bogusław Stachura (1969–1981)
- Władysław Ciastoń (1981–1986)
- Henryk Dankowski (1986–1989)
- Jerzy Karpacz (1989)

== Tasks and organizational structure ==
The tasks of the Security Service were identical to that of its predecessors (MBP, UB and KdsBP): to protect the communist system in the country (and beyond) through control and penetration into all structures of social life in Poland and abroad. The centrally-based MSW was divided into departments, bureaus, sections and directorates. The following was observed in the SB after the agency was founded:

- Division I (Intelligence): Replaced I (1st) KdsBP Division in 1956.
- Division II (Counter-intelligence): Replaced II (2nd) KdsBP Division in 1956.
- Division III (Anti-State Activity): Replaced Divisions III–VI (3rd–6th) of the KdsBP in 1956. Later replaced with Division of protection of the constitutional order of the state in 1989.
- Division A (Ciphers): Replaced the A Department of KdsBP in 1956.
- Division B (Observation): Replaced the B section of KdsBP in 1956
- Division C (Operational Records): Replaced the X (10th) KdsBP Division in 1956.
- Division T (Operational Technology): Replaced the IX (9th) KdsBP Division in 1956.
- Division W (Correspondence Investigation): Replaced the W section of KdsBP in 1956
- Investigation Division: Replaced the VII (7th) KdsBP Division in 1956.
- Government Protection Division: Replaced the VIII (8th) KdsBP Division in 1956.
- Foreigner Registration Division: Operational assets taken from MO in 1960. In 1965, it was integrated to the Border Control Department.
- Division IV (Protection of churches and religious associations): Separated from Division III in 1962. From 1981–1984, it's tasked to protect Polish agriculture. It was replaced in 1989 with Study and Analysis Division.
- Passports Division: Operational assets taken from MO in 1964. From 1972 to 1990, it was tasked to register foreigners living/working in Poland.
- RKW Division (Radio counter-intelligence): Separated from Division II in 1965. Integrated with Division A in 1989.
- Border Control Department: Operational assets taken from the Border Protection Troops in 1965. Worked alongside the FRD until BCD was sent back to the BPT in 1972 with some duties taken by Division II and MO.
- Division IIIA / V (Operational protection of Industry): Originally separated from Division III in 1979. Later replaced in 1989 with Division of Economic Protection. Operational assets transferred from MO in 1981–82.
- Censorship Division: Operated during the martial law period of 1981. Intercepted phone calls and postal items. Involved SB agents from W and T Divisions.
- Study Division (Investigation of opposition), replaced in 1989 with Study and Analysis Division.
- Communication Division: Operational assets taken from MO in 1984.
- Division VI (Operational protection of Agriculture), replaced in 1989 with Division of Economic Protection.
- Officer Protection Division: Operational assets taken from MO in 1985.

=== 1981 SB Structure ===
The SB was further reorganized in 1981 due to reforms made by Czesław Kiszczak. This was made under Resolution No. 144 of the Council of Ministers of October 21, 1983 on granting the organizational statute to the Ministry of Internal Affairs, later amended by Resolution No. 128 of the Council of Ministers of August 22, 1989.

- Intelligence/Counter-intelligence Service
- Security Service
- Operational Security Service
- Bureau of Investigation
- Government Protection Bureau
- Security Board Officers

== Ranks ==
The following ranks were observed until 1990:

Stanowiska służbowe	Przyporządkowane stopnie
minister	Major general / Lieutenant general
vice minister	Major general
chief of the service	Major general
deputy chief of the service	Brigadier general
department chief	Colonel / Brigadier general
deputy department chief	Colonel
division chief	Colonel
deputy division chief	Lieutenant colonel
senior inspector	Major / Lieutenant colonel
inspector	Captain / Major
junior inspector	Lieutenant / Captain

== Activities ==
After it was renamed the SB in 1956, it entered a period of relative inactivity during the era of reform instituted by Władysław Gomułka. However, after 1968 it was revived as a stronger body responsible for political repression, most notably of the Solidarity movement, the leader of which, Lech Wałęsa, was under constant SB surveillance. Throughout the martial law (1981–1983), SB played a key role in wiretapping telephones in public areas and institutions. It also participated in infiltrating Solidarity's committees and gatherings.

The torture and execution of Catholic priest Jerzy Popiełuszko by SB members (who were later convicted of murder) in 1984 shook Poland. The agency is also suspected of killing Stanisław Pyjas, Catholic priest Stefan Niedzielak, and is reported to have abused priest Roman Kotlarz, who died mysteriously after a beating.

== Victims ==
An infamous case was the torture and execution by the SB of Catholic priest Jerzy Popiełuszko in 1984. Since 1990, several SB operatives have been tried for their crimes. The SB is also suspected of killing Stanisław Pyjas and Catholic priest Stefan Niedzielak. It is reported to have abused priest Roman Kotlarz, who died mysteriously after a beating.

== In popular culture ==
The SB is featured in the Polish TV series 1983 which is set in an alternative 2003 where Poland is still a communist country.

== See also ==
- Sławomir Petelicki
- Grzegorz Przemyk
- Marian Zacharski
- Eastern Bloc politics
- Instytut Pamięci Narodowej
- Montelupich prison
- Rakowiecka prison
- Polish United Workers' Party
- Telephone tapping in the Eastern Bloc
