= Jerzy Popiełuszko assassination videotapes =

The videotapes were demonstrated during the Toruń trial regarding the assassination of a 37-year-old priest Jerzy Popiełuszko on 19 October 1984, including the reactions by the perpetrators of the incident.

Regarding the demonstration of videotapes, there are seventeen VHS tapes, along with eight audio tapes and six cassette tapes, investigating the assassination of Father Jerzy Popiełuszko.

== Background ==
During the Toruń trial, Marcin Pietruszewski, a head of the Collection, Processing, and Storage Management section at the Bydogoszcz branch had seventeen VHS tapes, eight audio tapes, and six cassette tapes, which the materials are recorded in "List 821" of the Institute of National Remembrance (IPN). They contain the investigation of the assassination of Father Jerzy Popiełuszko.

While audiovisual materials are "undoubtably among valuable collections" both audio and video recordings, the recordings by Security Service (SB) revealed behind-the-scenes conversation between communist representatives and some representatives from the opposing side. The recordings were from Magdalenka and they also gained notoriety several years ago, including over 1,500 films that are publicly accessible by IPN. Therefore, there are over thousands to two thousands of recordings by SB officers and Military Secret Service respectively, regardless of their destruction.

=== News footage of body discovery ===
On 30 October 1984, Dziennik Telewizyjny reported that the body of Father Jerzy was recovered from the Vistula River near Włocławek as he was murdered by Security Service secret agents of the Department IV of the Ministry of Internal Affairs. On the other hand, Polish Radio obtained a report from divers who were searching the body of Father Jerzy. The report was previously unknown to historians and the public.

== Toruń trial ==
A retired pathologist Dr. Maria Byrdy conducted the autopsy of Father Jerzy in the aftermath of his assassination and his body discovery. While she was on the center stage on 28 January 1985, Dr. Byrdy spoke to the audience who were interested in listening to her testimony regarding that the cause of death was impossible to identify.

In addition to speaking to the audience, Dr. Byrdy, without emotion testified that Father Jerzy died of severe beating, combined with shock and strangulation via nylon cord. The nylon cord was wrapped around his neck so that Father Jerzy is unable to expel blood and vomit flooding through his respiratory system. Therefore, Dr. Byrdy neutrally held one of two stained gauze that Father Jerzy's assassins forced into the priest's mouth. The half-hour police film showed the body discovery of Father Jerzy on 30 October 1984, 11 days after the assassination. It also showed that Father Jerzy's legs were tied to a noose, which causes him to strangle if straightened. Evidently, the rope binding came loose in Father Jerzy's hands along with several gags that were freed.

When cameras were trained of the priest's face, police officials declared that they were "clear signs of beating," as the medical evidence was confirmed by Dr. Byrdy. Dr. Byrdy suggested that Father Jerzy was struck more than a "dozen times" with a club. While watching the videotape, three former Security Service officers who assassinated Father Jerzy–Grzegorz Piotrowski, Waldemar Chmielewski, Leszek Pękala–buried their heads as one of the men shuddered, bowing his head and apparently sobbing in response to the body discovery. In addition to burying their heads and one apparently sobbing, Piotrowski requested to stop the videotape from playing.

Chmielewski had a severe stutter when speaking in court and testified that the speech defect "had begun" after the assassination, but before murder charge he was speaking normally.

The tape was made shortly after the former lieutenant's arrest on 19 October 1984 (during the assassination of Father Jerzy) in order to retrace kidnapping.

Pietruszewski explained that the materials were kept at the District Court of Toruń until last year, along with the interrogation of the assassins for several hours. According to Pietruszewski regarding the videotape incident, while the trial believed to be staged was "evident," the audience including the plainclothes militia officers were carefully selected and the television footage was carefully edited. However, they failed to convey the motivations and personalities of the assassins.
