= Timeline of Jerzy Popiełuszko =

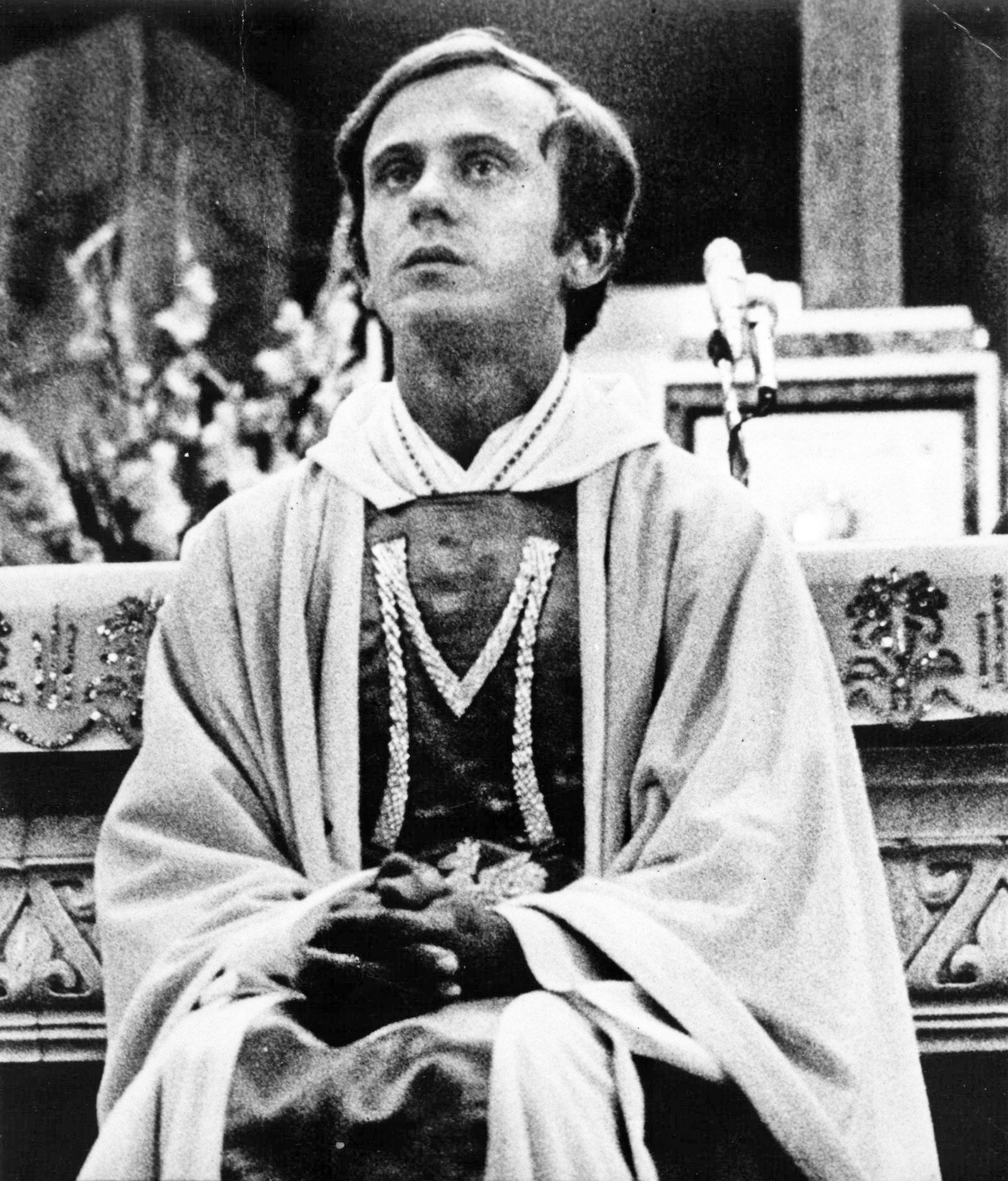
Father Jerzy Popiełuszko

The article consists of Jerzy Popiełuszko's timeline, including childhood and youth, priesthood, assassination, and postmortem.

== Childhood and youth ==
- 14 September 1947 – Popiełuszko was born on the Feast of the Exaltation of the Holy Cross in Okopy near Suchowola, the son of Władysław and Marianna, née Gniedziejko.
- 16 September 1947 – He was baptized in the parish church of St. Peter and Paul the Apostles in Suchowola; he was given the name Alfons.
- 1 September 1954 – Began attending primary school in Suchowola.
- 3 June 1956 – First Holy Communion in the parish church in Suchowola.
- 17 June 1956 – Confirmation administered by Bishop Władysław Suszyński. Alek took the name Kazimierz, which was his grandfather's name.
- On 1 June 1965, he passed his secondary school leaving examination at the Secondary School in Suchowola.
- 24 June 1965 – After graduating from secondary school, he applied and was accepted to the Metropolitan Seminary in Warsaw. He began his studies in September.
- Between 25 October 1966 and 16 October 1968 – He performed military service in a clerical unit with strict regulations in Bartoszyce.
- 18 April 1970 – He underwent a difficult thyroid operation due to complications and a life-threatening condition. The entire seminary prayed for his health.
- 13 May 1971 – Seminary officials changed his name from Alfons to Jerzy Aleksander.

== Priesthood ==
- 12 December 1971 – He was ordained a subdeacon.
- 12 marca 1972 – He became a deacon.
- 28 May 1972 – He was ordained a priest in St. John's Archcathedral in Warsaw by Blessed Cardinal Stefan Wyszyński. On his first Mass card, Fr. Jerzy wrote the words: "God sends me to preach the Gospel and heal the wounds of aching hearts."
- 2 June 1972 – He celebrated his first Mass.
- 19 June 1972 – He was appointed curate of the Holy Trinity parish in Ząbki near Warsaw.
- 1 October 1974 – Began a two-year extramural Pastoral Studies course at the Faculty of Theology of the Catholic University of Lublin.
- 4 October 1975 – He became curate at the parish of Our Lady Queen of Poland in Anin.
- 20 May 1978 – He was transferred to the vicariate of the Parish of the Infant Jesus in Żoliborz. His health deteriorated, spending several weeks in hospital.
- 19 February 1979 – He was appointed chaplain to mid-level medical personnel in Warsaw.
- 25 May 1979 – He was transferred to the academic chaplaincy at St. Anne's Church in Warsaw.
- 20 May 1980 – He became a resident of the parish of St. Stanislaus Kostka in Żoliborz, assigned to specialist pastoral care for the Health Service. This was his last place of residence and work.
- 8–29 June 1980 – Visited his aunt Mary Kalinowski in the United States. He stayed in North Carolina, Virginia and Florida.
- 31 August 1980 – He celebrated Holy Mass for striking steelworkers at the Warsaw Steelworks.
- 16 December 1980 – He attended the unveiling ceremony of the Monument to the Shipyard Workers who died in December 1970.
- 26 April 1981 – He consecrated the banner of the Solidarity Trade Union of the Warsaw Steelworks, brought by steelworkers to St. Stanislaus Kostka Church.
- 6 October 1981 – He took on pastoral care of the sick at the Home for Distinguished Health Service Employees in Warsaw at 37 Elekcyjna Street, setting up chapels there and becoming chaplain by virtue of a curial appointment.
- November 1981 – He supported striking students at the Higher Officer School of Firefighting.
- 13 December 1981 – Martial law was declared in Poland.
- 18 February 1982 – He celebrated his first Holy Mass for the Homeland at St. Stanislaus Kostka Church in Żoliborz, during which he delivers the first of his 26 famous sermons.
- March 1982 – Stayed at the railway hospital in Warsaw.
- 19 May 1983 – He conducted the funeral of Grzegorz Przemyk, a high school graduate beaten to death by militiamen from the police station in Warsaw at 1/3 Jezuicka Street.
- 30 August 1983 – On his way to Gdynia, where he was to deliver a sermon, he was detained by the militia and held for eight hours at the police station in Łomianki. The trip did not take place.
- 18 September 1983 – First pilgrimage of working people to Jasna Góra.
- 12 December 1983 – Interrogated by the prosecutor's office in Warsaw. Fr. Jerzy's flat on Chłodna Street was searched, and the priest was held in custody for two days at the Mostowski Palace. Prosecutor Anna Jackowska presented Fr. Jerzy with charges.
- 27 December 1983 – Jerzy Urban, government press spokesman, published a defamatory article against Father Jerzy under the pseudonym Michał Ostrowski, see Express Wieczorny, 27 December 1983. The article, entitled “The studio flat of citizen Popiełuszko”, was later reprinted in other media outlets.
- 2 January 1984 – At the request of Archbishop Bronisław Dąbrowski, Father Jerzy refuted the accusations and insinuations made by Jerzy Urban in 13 points.
- 12 June 1984 – Father Jerzy was interrogated by the security authorities at the Mostowski Palace in Warsaw, where he is presented with an indictment.
- 26 June 1984 – Interrogation of Father Jerzy at the District Prosecutor's Office in Warsaw.
- 2 July 1984 – The District Prosecutor's Office in Warsaw brought charges against Father Jerzy, alleging that he abused "his position as a priest to turn churches into places of anti-state propaganda harmful to the interests of the Polish People's Republic, i.e. a crime under Article 194 of the Criminal Code in conjunction with Article 58."
- 12 July 1984 – Filing of an indictment against Father Jerzy by Deputy Provincial Prosecutor Anna Jackowska at the District Court for the Capital City of Warsaw.
- 15 July 1984 – Reading of a statement by priests in St. Stanislaus Kostka Church stated that “Fr. Jerzy works in this parish, and we, the priests jointly responsible for pastoral life, consider it our duty to publicly protest against unjust accusations, and we call on the faithful to pray.”
- 29 July 1984 – Monsignor Teofil Bogucki, parish priest of St. Stanislaus Kostka Parish, defended Father Jerzy against attacks by the state authorities in his homily during a Mass for the Homeland.
- 24 August 1984 – Criminal proceedings against Father Jerzy was discontinued by decision of the District Court of the Capital City of Warsaw.
- 26 August 1984 – Father Jerzy delivered his last homily during a Mass for the Homeland.
- 9 September 1984 – Father Jerzy delivered a homily to workers at St. Stanislaus Kostka Church, in which he protested against suggestions by Jerzy Urban, press spokesman for the Polish People's Republic government, ‘to send people like him into exile’.
- 12 September 1984 – The Soviet newspaper Izvestia published an article by Leonid Toporkov slandering Solidarity and Father Jerzy.
- 19 September 1984 – The Warsaw weekly Tu i Teraz published a slanderous attack on Father Jerzy entitled Seanse nienawiści (Sessions of Hatred) by Jerzy Urban, who used the pseudonym Jan Rem.
- 25 September 1984 – A meeting of senior officials was held at the Ministry of Internal Affairs in Warsaw to discuss how to “silence” priests who were “acting against the state” (Małkowski, Jankowski and Popiełuszko).
- 30 September 1984 – Father Jerzy participated in the Second Pilgrimage of Working People to Jasna Góra. There, he met Father Jerzy Osiński, who invites him to Bydgoszcz, to the parish of the Holy Polish Martyr Brothers, to celebrate Mass and deliver a sermon on 19 October. Father Osiński did not realize that he was inviting Father Popiełuszko to the last Mass of his life.
- 8 October 1984 – Father Jerzy celebrated Mass at the Parish of the Exaltation of the Holy Cross in Bytom.
- 9 October 1984 – Officials from the Ministry of Internal Affairs decided to eliminate Father Jerzy.
- 13 October 1984 – Father Jerzy, accompanied by Waldemar Chrostowski and Seweryn Jaworski, travels to Gdańsk. From St. Stanislaus Kostka Church, he was followed the entire time by Grzegorz Piotrowski, Leszek Pękala, and Waldemar Chmielewski, who were driving behind him.
- 13 October 1984 – Father Jerzy celebrated Mass at St. Brigid's Church in Gdańsk and delivered a homily.
- 13/14 October 1984, around midnight – Near Ostróda, an unsuccessful attempt on the life of Father Jerzy on his way back from Gdańsk to Warsaw. The perpetrators were Captain Grzegorz Piotrowski, Leszek Pękala and Waldemar Chmielewski.
- 15 October 1984 – Father Jerzy was at Jasna Góra, where he celebrated Mass for his sick parish priest, Father Teofil Bogucki, who was in hospital at the time.

== Assassination ==
- 19 October 1984 at 6 p.m. – Father Jerzy celebrated Mass and leads a rosary service at the Church of the Holy Polish Martyr Brothers in Bydgoszcz, where he travelled by car with his driver, Waldemar Chrostowski.
- 19 October 1984 around 10 p.m. – On his way back to Warsaw, near the village of Przysiek near Toruń, Father Jerzy was abducted by officers of the Ministry of Internal Affairs: Grzegorz Piotrowski, Leszek Pękala and Waldemar Chmielewski. He was tied up, brutally beaten, pushed into the boot of a car and, on the Włocławek dam, thrown into the Vistula River in a sack weighted down with stones.

== Postmortem ==
- 20 October 1984, 7:50 p.m. – The television news reported the abduction of Father Popiełuszko. Immediately after the evening news, people gathered in the church. At 10 p.m., the first mass was celebrated for the safety of Father Jerzy. The second took place at midnight.
- 21 October 1984 – From 7 a.m., daily masses began for the intention of saving Father Popiełuszko.
- 21 October 1984, 7:30 p.m. – The television news program Dziennik Telewizyjny reported again and provided an extended description of the abduction of Father Popiełuszko.
- 22 October 1984 – The Press Office of the Polish Episcopate issued a special statement on the kidnapping of the priest. A separate statement was issued by the Warsaw Curia, which was directly responsible for priests in its diocese.
- 23 October 1984 – Waldemar Chrostowski was transported to Warsaw under the protection of the Ministry of Internal Affairs. He went directly to St. Stanislaus Kostka Church and stayed at the presbytery.
- 24 October 1984, 12:00 noon – During a general audience in Rome, Pope John Paul II spoke about Father Jerzy, expressing his solidarity with the faithful who were waiting for the priest's return.
- 24 October 1984 – The authorities revealed that Security Service officers have been arrested.
- 26 October 1984 – In the church, Father Jan Sikorski conducted the Way of the Cross with the participation of 200 clerics from the Warsaw Seminary.
- 27 October 1984 – The names of the kidnappers were revealed. They were known to be employees of the Fourth Department of the Ministry of Internal Affairs, which was responsible for combating the Catholic Church: the head of one of the departments, Grzegorz Piotrowski, and two department officers, Leszek Pękala and Waldemar Chmielewski.
- 29 October 1984 – An announcement was made stating that the search for Father Popiełuszko's body had begun in the Vistula River near Toruń and Włocławek.
- 30 October 1984, around 5 p.m. – Father Jerzy's body was found in a reservoir near the dam in Włocławek. During the night, it was transported to the Institute of Forensic Medicine in Białystok.
- 31 October 1984 – Autopsy of Father Popiełuszko at the Institute of Forensic Medicine of the Medical Academy in Białystok, conducted by Professor Maria Byrda and Dr Tadeusz Jóźwik.
- 2 November 1984 – Decree by Cardinal Józef Glemp permitting the burial of Father Jerzy in the cemetery of St. Stanislaus Kostka Church.
- 2 November 1984 – Identification of Father Jerzy's body in the morgue of the hospital in Białystok, dressing of the body, placing it in a coffin and transporting it to St. Stanislaus Kostka Church in Warsaw, after a solemn farewell ceremony in Białystok. The Primate of Poland entrusted this task to Fr. Grzegorz Kalwarczyk and Fr. Edward Żmijewski. A vigil was held at the coffin throughout the night. In the morning, when everyone was asked to leave the church, the coffin was opened one last time so that his parents could see their son's body one more time.
- 3 November 1984 – Funeral of Father Popiełuszko in the grave next to St. Stanislaus Kostka Church in Warsaw. The ceremony was presided over by Cardinal Józef Glemp, Metropolitan of Gniezno and Warsaw, Primate of Poland. Six bishops, over a thousand priests and several hundred thousand faithful from Warsaw and all over Poland participated in the Mass.
- 13 December 1984 – Monsignor Teofil Bogucki established the Father Jerzy Popiełuszko Pro-Life Movement.
- 27 December 1984 to 7 February 1985 – A trial of Father Jerzy's murderers, carefully orchestrated by the authorities of the Polish People's Republic, took place in Toruń. Grzegorz Piotrowski was sentenced to 25 years in prison, Leszek Pękala to 15 years, and Waldemar Chmielewski to 14 years. Colonel Adam Pietruszka, the killers' superior, received 25 years. The defendants never admitted their guilt and used their statements in court to launch brutal attacks on the Catholic Church and its hierarchy. They were granted amnesty twice (in 1986 and 1987; Pękala's sentence is 6 years, Chmielewski has 4 years and six months to serve, and Piotrowski has 15 years) and have been at large for many years. Attorneys Andrzej Grabiński, Krzysztof Piesiewicz, Jan Olszewski and Edward Wende acted as auxiliary prosecutors, also defending the good name of Father Jerzy and his family.
- 19 and 22 April 1985 – Following a review hearing, the Supreme Court upheld the judgment of the Provincial Court in Toruń.
- New York Mayor Ed Koch named one of the city's squares after Jerzy Popiełuszko during a ceremony..
- 14 June 1987 – Pope John Paul II visited Father Jerzy's grave.
- 9 September 1987 – Monsignor Teofil Bogucki, parish priest of St Stanislaus Kostka Parish in Warsaw, died. He was buried at St Stanislaus Kostka Church.
- 15 January 1990 – Establishment of the Father Jerzy Popiełuszko Foundation for the Secondary School in Suchowola, with the aim of promoting the figure of Father Jerzy Popiełuszko (KRS No. 0000036761, formerly FOUNDATION REGISTER 373 DISTRICT COURT FOR THE CITY OF WARSAW – PRAGA CIVIL DIVISION I).
- 11 October 1990 – a stone commemorating Father Jerzy was unveiled in Toruń on Bydgoska Street.
- 1990 – An investigation was launched into the alleged managerial responsibility for the murder of Father Popiełuszko against the former deputy head of the Ministry of Internal Affairs and head of the Security Service, General Władysław Ciaston, and the head of the Fourth Department of the Ministry of Internal Affairs, General Zenon Płatek.
- 1991 – Prosecutor Andrzej Witkowski was removed from the case.
- 17 October 1992 – A monument to Father Jerzy Popiełuszko was unveiled in Paris.
- 1994 – The court acquitted both generals, Ciaston and Płatek, of the charge of ordering the murder of Father Jerzy.
- 4 February 1995 – Archbishop Henryk Muszyński named the hospice in Bydgoszcz after Father Jerzy Popiełuszko.
- 1996 – The Court of Appeal in Warsaw overturned the acquittal of Generals Ciaston and Płatek; this means that the proceedings would be reopened.
- 8 February 1997 to 8 February 2001 – The beatification process of Fr. Jerzy was underway. The postulator was Monsignor Zdzisław Król, the promoter was Father Gabriel Bartoszewski OFMCap, the judges were Monsignors Grzegorz Kalwarczyk and Stefan Kośnik, and the notaries were Zofia Grzelczyk and Katarzyna Soborak.
- 3 May 2001 – The second stage of the beatification process began in the Vatican. Father Zbigniew Kiernikowski became the postulator, and after his appointment as Bishop of Siedlce, Father Tomasz Kaczmarek took over.
- 5 February 2002 – Prosecutor Witkowski (then working at the branch of the Institute of National Remembrance’s Commission for the Prosecution of Crimes against the Polish Nation in Lublin) began his own investigation; its aim is to expose a “criminal association” operating in the Ministry of Internal Affairs of the Polish People’s Republic between 1956 and 1989: he was removed from the investigation in October 2004.
- 25 May 2002 – Cardinal Joseph Ratzinger, Prefect of the Congregation for the Doctrine of the Faith, prayed at Father Jerzy's grave. He wrote the following words in the memorial book: "May God bless Poland by giving it priests with the evangelical spirit of Popiełuszko."
- By Resolution No. 147/XXVII/2004 of the Ząbki Town Council of 14 October 2004, Father Jerzy Popiełuszko was posthumously awarded the title of honorary citizen of the Town of Ząbki.
- 16 October 2004 – The Father Jerzy Popiełuszko Museum was opened.
- March 2007 – Public Junior High School No. 2 in Ząbki is named after Father Jerzy Popiełuszko.
- 19 May 2009 – Archbishop Angelo Amato, Prefect of the Congregation for the Causes of Saints, prayed at Father Jerzy's grave together with Cardinal William Joseph Levada, Prefect of the Congregation for the Doctrine of the Faith.
- 13 October 2009 – Posthumously awarded the Order of the White Eagle by Polish president Lech Kaczyński.
- 19 December 2009 – Pope Benedict XVI issued a decree on the martyrdom of Father Jerzy Popiełuszko.
- 6–7 April 2010 – The exhumation and canonical examination of Father Jerzy's relics took place. During the examination, small bone fragments were taken for relics.
- 6 June 2010 – Beatification of Father Jerzy Popiełuszko in Warsaw's Victory Square, formerly Piłsudski Square.
- 19 October 2010 – First liturgical commemoration of Blessed Father Jerzy.
- 19 October 2011 – a monument to Father Popiełuszko was unveiled in Toruń
- 21 June 2011 – Piotr Libera, Bishop of Płock, established a new parish in Nuna dedicated to Blessed Father Jerzy Popiełuszko.
- 15 August 2012 – naming of the newly built chapel in Bieżanów, Kraków, after Blessed Jerzy Popiełuszko.
- 20 September 2014 – Commencement of the canonization process in Créteil, France.
- On 17 October 2014, a museum and educational complex called the Father Jerzy Popiełuszko Youth Education Centre was opened in Górsk
- 19 October 2014 – Jan Wątroba, Bishop of Rzeszów, signed a decree establishing a parish dedicated to Blessed Father Jerzy Popiełuszko in Rzeszów.
- November 2014 – Archbishop Stanisław Gądecki of Poznań established a new parish dedicated to Blessed Jerzy Popiełuszko in Plewiska near Poznań.
- 16 February 2015 – The Town Council of Szczawno-Zdrój named the street where the new Church of Our Lady of Częstochowa in Szczawno-Zdrój, on the border with Wałbrzych, will be built after Father Jerzy Popiełuszko.
- 14 September 2015 – End of the diocesan stage of the process concerning the alleged miracle through the intercession of Blessed Father Jerzy. The files of the process were sent to the Congregation for the Causes of Saints in Rome.
