= Adam Pietruszka =

Polish Security Service officer (born 1938)

- Born: 19 July 1938 (age 87); Kutno, Poland
- Allegiance: Security Service (formerly)
- Branch: Department IV (formerly)
- Service years: 1961–1984
- Known for: Known for aiding and abetting the assassination of Jerzy Popiełuszko

Adam Pietruszka (born 19 July 1938 in Kutno) is a former Security Service officer, deputy director of Department IV of the Ministry of Internal Affairs (1981–1984), head of Division I of Department IV (1979–1981). In 1984, in connection with the murder of Father Jerzy Popiełuszko, he was demoted from the rank of colonel of the Citizens' Militia and dismissed from service on disciplinary grounds. In the Toruń trial, he was sentenced to 25 years' imprisonment and deprivation of public rights for 10 years.

== Biography ==
Son of Wojciech and Anastazja, Adam's father was a farm worker. In 1956, he took up employment at DOKP in Szczecin and began working at the Szczecin Port Centralny locomotive depot as a mechanic technician and assistant engineer. From November 1958 to October 1960, he performed his basic military service, during which he graduated from the non-commissioned officer school in Grudziądz. After being discharged to the reserves, he returned to work at the locomotive depot in Szczecin. In 1952–1956, he was a member of the Union of Polish Youth, and in 1958–1960, he was a member of the Military Youth Club. In 1962, he joined the Polish United Workers' Party. While serving in the Citizens' Militia in Szczecin, he held the positions of second secretary of the OOP (1966–1970) and then first secretary of the OOP (1970–1972).

From August 1961, Pietruszka was an officer of the Security Service. In September 1962, he began his studies at the Annual Officer Training School of the Security Service of the Ministry of Internal Affairs at the Ministry of Internal Affairs Training Center in Legionowo. He graduated in July 1963 with good results. In June 1970, he completed administrative studies at the Faculty of Law and Administration of the Adam Mickiewicz University in Poznań. After presenting his master's thesis entitled "Direct coercion in administrative enforcement" and passing his master's exam, he obtained a master's degree in administration.

Pietruszka was sent on business trips to Italy (1978), the USSR (1982 and 1984) and the GDR (1983). He was accused of inciting his subordinates: Captain Grzegorz Piotrowski, Lieutenant Leszek Pękala, and Lieutenant Waldemar Chmielewski to kidnap and murder Jerzy Popiełuszko in 1984, as well as of aiding them and obstructing the investigation. On 2 November 1984, in connection with the abduction and murder of Father Jerzy Popiełuszko, he was detained and on 4 November he was remanded in custody. A day later, he was suspended from his duties, and on 24 December 1984, he was punished with expulsion from the Milicji Obywatelskiej and simultaneous demotion. Along with his expulsion from the service, he was removed from the Polish United Workers' Party. As a result of a trial before the Provincial Court in Toruń, he was found guilty of the charges against him and sentenced to 25 years' imprisonment and deprivation of public rights for 10 years. He was released from prison in 1995.

According to Ferdinando Imposimato, the Italian prosecutor investigating the assassination attempt on Pope John Paul II, Pietruszka and several other Security Service officers were present in St. Peter's Square at the time of the attack. According to historians from the Institute of National Remembrance, he was the officer in charge of the most valuable Security Service agents among the clergy, including the secret Security Service collaborator Fr. Michał Czajkowski, alias Jankowski.

== Awards ==
- Podpolkovnik of the Milicji Obywatelskiej – 1979
- Colonel of the Milicji Obywatelskiej– 1982
- Private of the Milicji Obywatelskiej– 1984 (demotion)

== Family life ==
Pietruszka is married and has a son, Jarosław.

Between 1985 and 1990, Adam Pietruszka's family was under surveillance by the Security Service as part of Operation Teresa.

== Orders and decorations ==
- Knights Cross of the Order of Polonia Restituta (16 January 1980)
- Gold Cross of Merit (7 July 1978)
- Silver Cross of Merit (3 July 1972)
- Gold Medal of Merit for National Defence (9 September 1982)
- Silver Medal "For Merit to National Defense" (25 September 1979)
- Bronze Medal "For Merit to National Defense" (7 October 1976)
- Gold Badge "For Merit in Protecting Public Order" (18 September 1980)
- Silver Badge "For Merit in the Protection of Public Order" (1 October 1975)
- Bronze Medal for Merit in the Protection of Public Order (27 September 1973)
- Silver Badge "In the Service of the Nation" (30 September 1981)
- Medal of the 40th Anniversary of People's Poland (22 July 1984)
- The "Gryf Pomorski" badge (1969)
- Badge "10 Years in the Service of the Nation" (September 20, 1971)

== Bibliography ==
- Ruane, Kevin (2008), Racja Stanu: Zabić księdza, Kraków: Znak, ISBN 978-83-240-1051-6
