= Jerzy Popiełuszko assassination trial =

1984 murder trial in Toruń, Poland

Toruń trial
- Started: 27 December 1984
- Decided: 7 February 1985
- Verdict: Grzegorz Piotrowski and Adam Pietruszka: 25 years in prison; Leszek Pękala: 15 years in prison; Waldemar Chmielewski: 14 years in prison

Court membership
- Judges sitting: 5 including other jurists
- Chief judge: Artur Kujawa
- Associate judges: Jurand Maciejewski

Following the assassination of 37-year-old Polish Catholic priest Jerzy Popiełuszko on 19 October 1984, the trial began on 27 December that year in the provincial court of Toruń in Poland. It investigated the following incident, conviction, and sentencing of four Polish officers, also known as the Toruń trial (Polish: procesie toruńskim). The four officers who were convicted and sentenced regarding the trial were Grzegorz Piotrowski, captain and the ringleader of Soviet-led Polish counterintelligence agency Security Service, Adam Pietruszka, Leszek Pękala, and Waldemar Chmielewski–ages 33, 47, 32, 29, respectively. The trial lasted until 7 February 1985. It was believed to be the first case to have communist government persecute four secret agents publicly.

== Trial ==
The trial began before the provincial court in Toruń, presided over by Judge Artur Kujawa, along with Judge Jurand Maciejewski. During the trial, the defendants who were Department IV officers of the Ministry of Internal Affairs–Piotrowski, Pietruska, Pękala, Chmielewski–were seated in two raised benches along a wall in front of the newly-painted courtroom, and they were seen wearing civilian cloths. Each of them were surrounded by uniformed guards. Leszek Pietrasiński, a prosecutor of a trial, read the indictment against four secret police agents. Judge Kujawa suggested that these four secret agents implemented their plan to intentionally kill Father Jerzy as it existed prior to the incident, which the statement lasted for 75 minutes. According to Judge Kujawa, when the assassination occurred during the few hours between the time, Father Jerzy was treated with "exceptional cruelty and ruthlessness". The four secret agents were convicted of four counts of charges–including abduction, torture, homicide, and abuse of power–and were subjected to sentencing. Piotrowski and Adam were sentenced to 25 years in prison, which was the longest under the Polish law, and both men were deprived of their basic rights for 10 years. On the other hand, Pękala received 15 years in prison and Chmielewski 14 years in prison. The trial was expected that the recommendations from the prosecutors are approved by presiding judge Artur Kujawa and his four co-jurists.

17 volumes of evidence, 79 exhibits, 17 videocassettes, and 13 tape recordings were amassed by state prosecutor Leszek Pietrasinski in response to the death of Father Jerzy, and was asked regarding who ordered it as he was not close to giving an answer to the question. Pietrasinski then gave a summation in the trial of four secret agents, displayed his profound emotional volatility upon the confessed leader Piotrowski of the death of Father Jerzy's murder, suggesting that he was a "cold and ruthless murderer," and a "rascal who used the confidence of his subordinates for a heinous crime".

=== Pietraskinski's critical attitude towards Father Jerzy ===
Pietrasinski was also critical towards Father Jerzy, if not only four indicted secret agents, and the Roman Catholic. Therefore he believed that Father Jerzy

was filled with hatred for socialist Poland. . . . They (the defendants) were extremists just as he [Father Jerzy] was an extremist. Thus two extremist attitudes met. They used military uniforms and the financial reserves of the Interior Ministry as if to confirm that terror is being used in Poland. It is known that the kidnaping caused a great resonance. The defendants’ act carries all the traits of a political provocation.

=== Testimony by Dr. Byrdy and the videotape ===
Dr. Maria Byrdy, a retired pathologist who conducted the autopsy of Father Jerzy after his body was being pulled from reservoir, was on the center stage last week, speaking to the audience who were captivated by her testimony regarding that she found it impossible to determine the cause of the death of a priest. Without emotion, Dr. Byrdy testified that the priest died from a "combination of severe beating, shock, strangulation by the nylon cord with which he had been trussed and from his inability to expel the blood and vomit that flooded through his respiratory system after the attack," causing her to neutrally hold one of two stained gauze that Father Jerzy's assassins forced into the priest's mouth.

One day after Dr. Byrdy's testimony regarding the determination of Father Jerzy's cause of death, the court, including judges, lawyers, and lawyers was subjected to watching a black-and-white videotape showing Father Jerzy's body moments after it was being pulled from the reservoir of Vistula River, causing Pękala, Chmielewski, and Piotrowski cried openly, bowed one's head, and "took deep breaths" respectively.

=== Death penalty and verdict ===
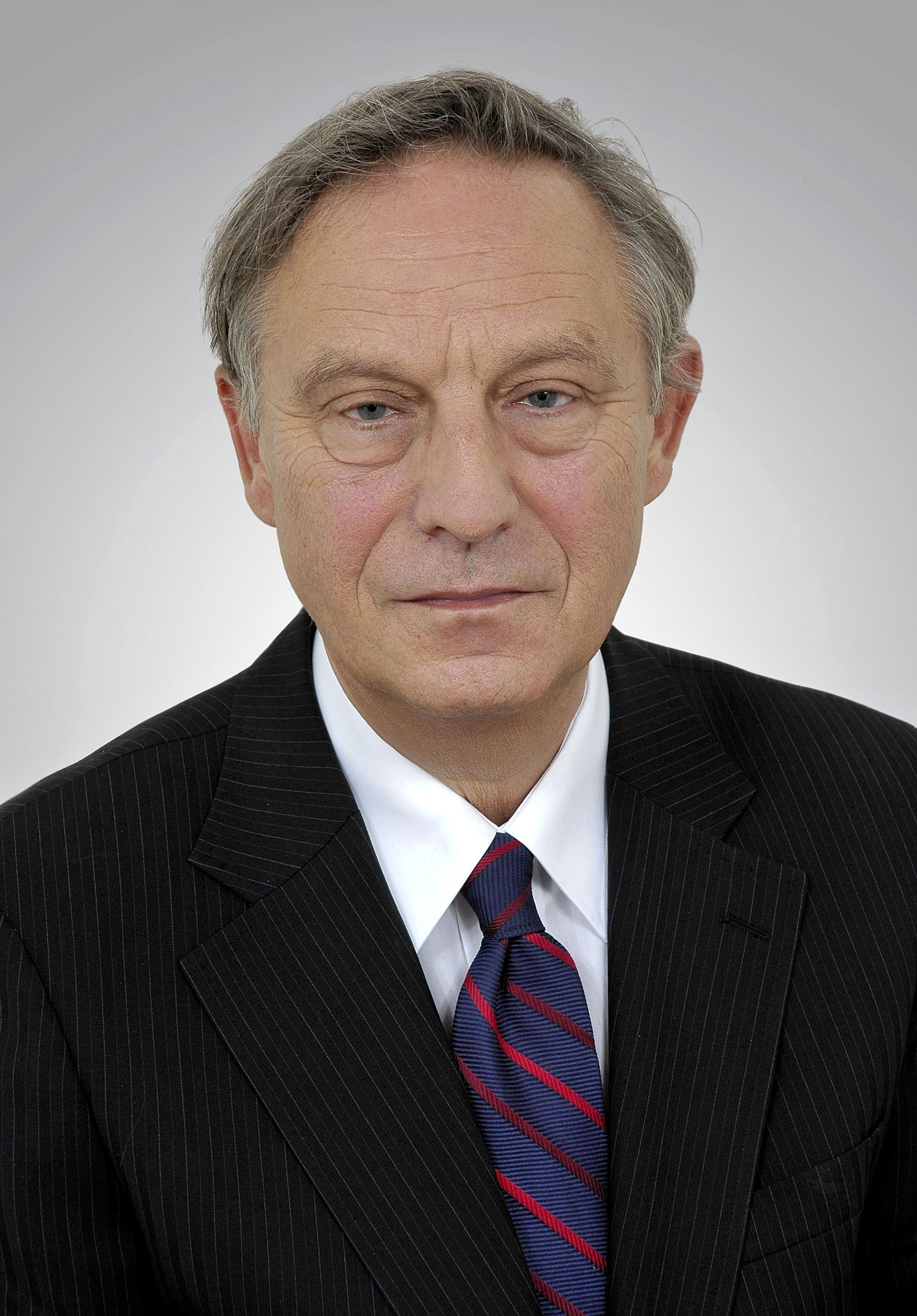
Krzysztof Piesiewicz

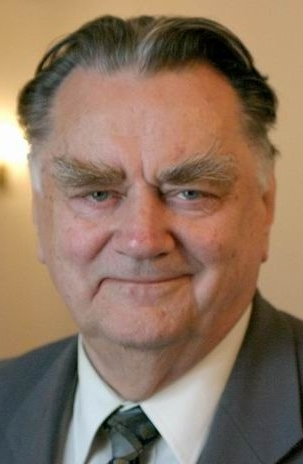
Jan Olszewski

The death penalty was demanded by Pietrasinski even though he was critical of Father Jerzy; however, the attorneys of Father Jerzy's family–Jan Olszewski, Edward Wende, Krzysztof Piesiewicz, Andrej Grabiński–were against it because Father Jerzy "would never have accepted death penalty." The trial concluded that the killers were convicted, but the verdict was "consistent with the thesis promoted by Security Service" that the assassination of Father Jerzy was to provoke the communist regime.

== Atmosphere of Toruń trial ==
During the trial, there was limited access to the courtroom, and only a few Polish journalists–Józefa Hennelowa from Tygodnik Powszechny and Father Antoni Poniński from Ład Boży–and foreign journalists were an exception that they were allowed to observe the trial. Wende, Olszewski, Piesiewicz, and Grabiński were appointed as "auxiliary prosecutors". 100 seats in the courtroom were reserved for the press; however, there were only six seats that had been distributed to western news organization, except the Washington Post.

There were helicopters hovering overhead as hundreds of onlookers were curious to see what was going on in the court as they were kept back. While the helicopters were hovering around the court, dozens of policemen set up the barricades, blocking the approaches pathways to the yellow-and-red, three-story brick courthouse on Piekarska Street in the provincial city of Toruń. Additionally, Toruń is 100 miles northwest of Warsaw. Since four secret police agents were brought to the court in handcuffs worked at the Ministry of the Interior, like other policemen outside, the precautions of security of the courthouse was considered to be ironic, and they were "exceptionally tight." Inside, the court was still, and it had changed abruptly from "the soporific to the macabre."

== Reactions to the trial ==
In response to the trial, there were public reactions of Poles that remained suppressed and they had been listening to the radio broadcast of a trial at 10:30 every night. Some Poles suggested the death penalty on Piotrowski as they believed he deserved it. Marek Cajzner, a journalist with the British Broadcasting Company (BBC)'s Polish Section, wondered the whole truth of the trial regarding if the whole part is "abhorrent" when forced to ask by the court. In the courtroom, some of them sympathized with Solidarity as selected journalists were allowed and television and radio coverage was carefully censored, as well as the transcripts of the trial by the patrons. Olszewski indicated that the perpetrators should be sought in Moscow. The reason why Olszewski stated was that "no one, especially in the Ministry of Internal Affairs, would dare to do anything in Father Jerzy's case without at least consultation, if not without recommendations from there."

In March 2022, Marzanna Piekarska-Drążek, the Judge of the Court of Appeal in Warsaw, suggested that the intention of persecution and fabrication of Father Jerzy's criminal trial was to organize the systematic repression not only Father Jerzy but those who strive to overthrow communism.

=== The analysis of the trial ===
According to the historians, it was agreed that the trial was "carefully prepared by the communist authorities, who ensured that as little information as possible about matters." This statement applies to the constant surveillance and harassment of Father Jerzy that was leaked to the public.
