= Last rosary mass of Jerzy Popiełuszko =

Event on 19 October 1984

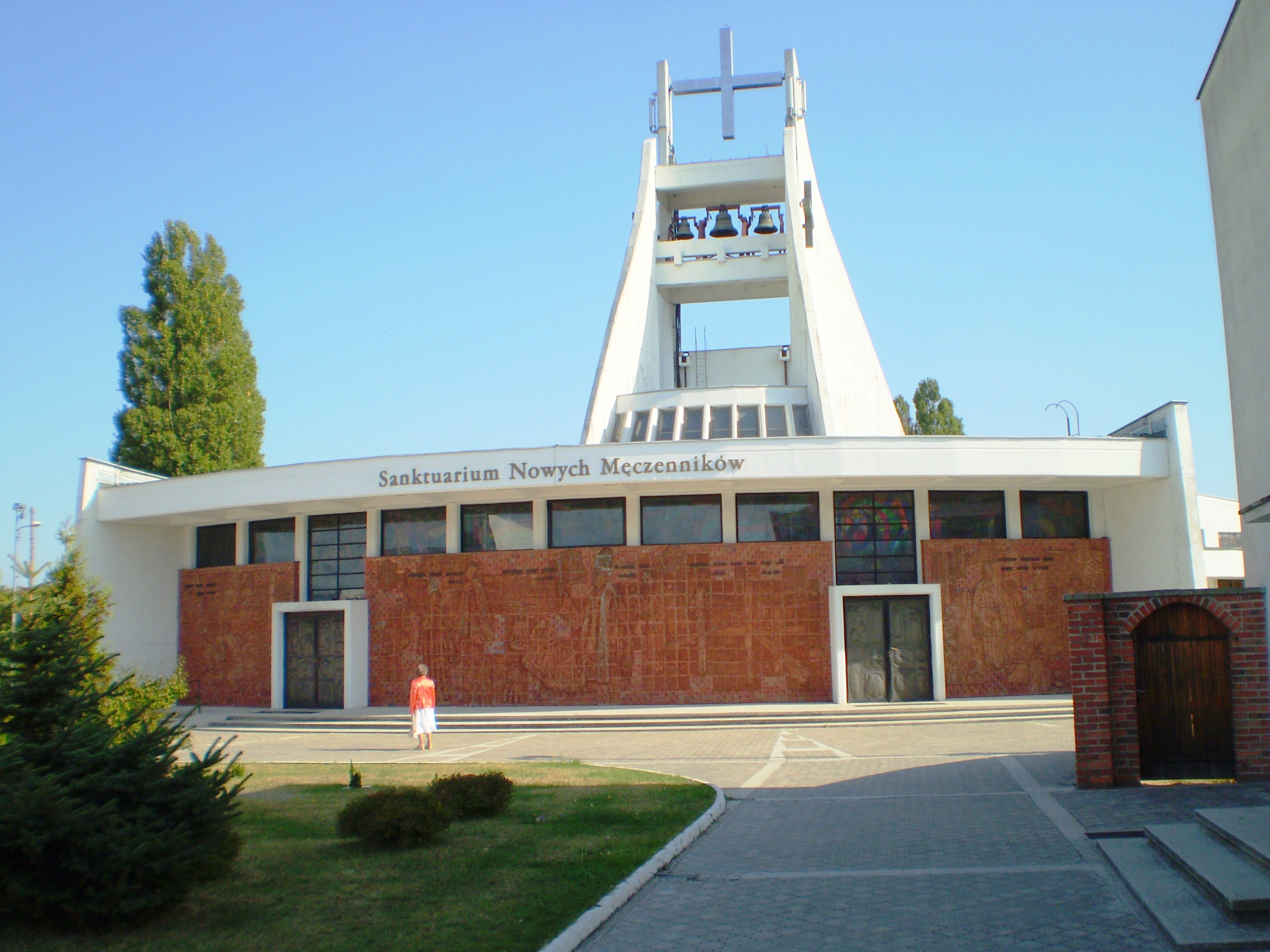
The Church of the Holy Polish Brothers Martyrs in Bydgoszcz

30-second sample of Father Jerzy Popiełuszko's last speech celebrating Rosary Devotions and Holy Mass in Bydgoszcz, 19 October 1984.

Shortly before the assassination on the same day, Jerzy Popiełuszko, a 37-year-old Roman Catholic priest, led a rosary mass during his final hours and his last public appearance. At that time, he celebrated the evening Rosary Devotions and Holy Mass in the Church of the Holy Polish Brothers Martyrs in Bydgoszcz at about six o'clock. The rosary was meditated in the sorrowful mysteries.

== Background ==
When Alfons (Father Jerzy) served two years of military service (from 1966 to 1968), he was bullied along with other seminarians and was punished for refusing to destroy his rosary. After being beaten, Alfons was made to stand barefoot for hours in the snow. However, he overcame fear as this harsh treatment made him stronger. Alfons, and the rest of the seminarians, were praying the rosary in the barracks. Alfons was ordained a priest in 1972 by Cardinal Stefan Wyszyński, as he changed his name to Jerzy during the seminary. He was sent to a Warsaw parish as he became a popular chaplain to young people. As Father Jerzy's frail health helped to emphasize with the sick and he was a familiar sight at the local hospital, he established a rosary group. The rosary group he established prayed and collected gifts from the poor.

== Content ==
Father Jerzy was invited to a prayer meeting, along with four other priests including Father Jerzy Osiński and Father Henryk Jankowski, and it was held by the pastoral care workers association in Bydgoszcz. Instead of preaching sermon, he instead delivered a meditation on the Sorrowful Mysteries of the Holy Rosary, despite warnings especially from a communist-led government that it would lead to serious consequences. These are sorrowful mysteries that Father Jerzy contemplated.

- The first sorrowful mystery is the "Agony in the Garden," and Father Jerzy spoke of human dignity and freedom. He quoted: "We must guard human dignity so that good may increase and thus overcome evil. We must remain free inwardly also when external circumstances are lacking in freedom. We must be ourselves in every historical situation. Our divine filiation carries in itself the inheritance of freedom." Then, Father Jerzy ended his meditation on the first sorrowful mystery that he and his congregation he led know how to behave in accordance to the dignity of the children of God.
- In the second mystery "Scourging at the Pillar," Father Jerzy sought justice emanating from truth and charity, suggesting that there is a lack of "love and of good" and there are the "germs from which hatred and violence swarm." This refers to when someone is motivated by hatred and violence, "one cannot speak of justice." Regarding to the second mystery he contemplated, imposing atheism as a system in Poland is unjust, suggesting that everyone is obligated to live in and ask for justice.
- The third mystery is the "Crowning with Thorns". This mystery suggests that he and the congregation should move closer to God, as well as the truth uniting and triumphing. Father Jerzy prayed that he and the congregation's ordinary life "may be filled with truth."
- In the fourth mystery "The Carrying of the Cross," the meditation on the virtue of the fortitude suggests that a Christian should fear the betrayal of Jesus Christ "for a few silver coins of hollow tranquility," and the follow of Christ must bear witness for it does not suffice to subject evil to condemnation and harms himself if he renounces the virtue of fortitude.
- The fifth and last mystery "The Crucifixion of Jesus" indicates that it constitutes against violence. He quoted in regards to this mystery:
  He [the follower of Christ] who is not given to convince with the heart and the head tries to win with force. Every idea capable of giving life is maintained by its own strength. And so it was with Solidarity, which, on its knees and with a rosary in its hands, fought for human dignity more than for bread. In Poland, in recent years, the fundamental rights of the human person have been curtailed. When this cornering made everyone feel its painful pressure, then the cry of freedom burst out. Solidarity arose, demonstrating that in order to build a society and its economy it is not necessary to do without God. Let us pray that we may be free from fear [and] intimidation, but above all from the lust for retaliation and violence.

His well-known last word of the rosary is also quoted in the original language, Polish, as "Módlmy się, byśmy byli wolni od lęku, zastraszenia, ale przede wszystkim od żądzy odwetu i przemocy." The last rosary also has an audio recording of it.

== Interpretation ==
The rosary, led by Father Jerzy, was meditated in sorrowful mysteries focusing on values including the dignity of the child of God, justice, truth, courage, and non violence. There were around 5,000 people who attended the Mass. After rosary meditation service and in the parish house, which it was Father Jerzy's last appearance, Father Jerzy met the representatives of the people's work community and was offered to stay overnight in Bydgoszcz, but he declined because he was feeling unwell and had a fever. Then one of the priests secretly informed Father Jerzy about his journey to the secret police.

=== Analysis of the rosary meditation ===
In addition to the overview of the last rosary led by Father Jerzy, the term "spiritual testament" that describes the last rosary of Father Jerzy was called by Father Franciszek Blachnicki. Late archbishop Wyszyński, responding to the last rosary, suggested that not many people tell the truth, but Christ chose few of them to proclaim it. While Christ is the one who chooses few people to proclaim the truth, on the other hand, lying is always numerous because lie is "petty and mercantile." According to Archbishop Józef Kowalczyk, Father Jerzy cried out to the Blessed Virgin Mary in response to those who were tormented and were often facing with "anxiety, distress, and brokenness" especially by the communist government. Then Archbishop Kowalczyk added that maintaining dignity is a way to multiply good and conquer evil as well as being guided by justice stemming from truth, love, and from God himself. Regarding his reflections in 1984 Archbishop Kowalczyk recalled, he also added that because of the virtue of courage, overcoming evil is possible and overcomes weakness in humans, including caring for courage between both government and the citizens. In addition to virtue of courage and weakness in humans, if a citizen abandons the virtue of courage, "they become a slave" and is subjected to harm not only themself, but their family, professional group, the nation, the state, and the Church. Antoni Tokarczuk reflected on how Father Jerzy was not involved in drama, but was focused on prayer. He then quoted:

(...)It wasn't like after his sermon you wanted to go throw stones at the 'Reds'. He didn't challenge the 'Reds'; rather, he encouraged self-reflection. He offered hope, and that was the most dangerous thing for the communist system of the time. (...)We also wanted to revive our Solidarity, opposition group in Bydgoszcz. I know that Father Osiński's intention was to turn the church in Wyżyny into a center similar to the parish of St. Stanislaus Kostka in Żoliborz (...)

Father Romuald Biniak, a parish priest whom he previously knew Father Jerzy from the media including newspapers, reflected that Father Jerzy was not involved in politics and did not encourage others to act up on violence, but declared that overcoming evil with good helps "remain faithful to the truth." In addition to him knowing Father Jerzy in newspapers, Father Biniak also stated that the church was quiet during the meditation. Jan Rulewski, a former Solidarity activist who attended Father Jerzy's Mass in Bydgoszcz, suggested that the service was “necessary to build faith." Czesława Mieszkowska quoted responding to those attending Mass did not hide their emotion: "Few people experience knowing a saint during his lifetime. I may not have had direct contact with Blessed Father Jerzy Popiełuszko, but I attended his Mass. I am familiar with his rosary meditations and other homilies. He is the patron saint of our hospice; we can turn to him and pray to him. This is very important."

=== Assassins attending the Mass ===
Four of the Security Service agents–Grzegorz Piotrowski, Leszek Pękala, Waldemar Chmielewski–were attending Mass with Father Jerzy celebrating. Piotrowski was inside the church. On the other hand, Pękala and Chmielewski were waiting outside in a car.

== Legacy ==
On 7 June 1999, Pope John Paul II spoke on the Bydgoszcz meadows, quoted:

The Primate of the Millennium, Servant of God Cardinal Stefan Wyszyński (...), having obtained from the then communist authorities, after many efforts, in 1973 permission to build the first church in Bydgoszcz after World War II, gave it the unusual title: 'Holy Polish Brothers Martyrs'. The Primate of the Millennium wished in this way to express his conviction that the Bydgoszcz land, afflicted by 'persecution for justice', is the right place for this church. It commemorates all the anonymous Poles who, during over a thousand years of the history of Polish Christianity, gave their lives for the Gospel of Christ and for the Homeland, beginning with Saint Adalbert. It is also significant that it was from this church that Father Jerzy Popiełuszko set out on his last journey. The words he spoke during that time Rosary meditations, also fit into this history: 'For to you it has been granted by grace on behalf of Christ not only to believe in Him, but also to suffer for Him' (Phil 1:29)

In front of the parish of the Church of the Holy Polish Brothers Martyrs in Bydgoszcz, the exhibition, created by Dr. Katarzyna Maniewska, was officially opened, which emphasizes the "timeliness of Father Jerzy's message."

The Bydgoszcz reliquary, a bronze sculpture of Blessed Father Jerzy by artist Gracjan Kajka, illustrates the priest kneeling beneath a cross, which the upper part contains relics surrounded by crown of thorns. Alongside, the sanctuary received two capsules containing relics: one of capsules was permanently placed in the sculpture, and the other one in a portable reliquary.

== See also ==
- Immaculata prayer
- Church of the Holy Polish Brothers Martyrs, Bydgoszcz

== Bibliography ==
- Rozynkowski, Waldemar (2020). Rozważania różańcowe błogosławionego księdza Jerzego Popiełuszki. Toruń, Poland: dk. Waldemar Rozynkowski. ISBN 978-83-66209-46-6.
