= Edward Wende =

- Born: 16 August 1936; Warsaw
- Died: 28 May 2002 (aged 65); Warsaw
- Education: University of Wrocław
- Known for: prosecution of the murderers of Father Jerzy Popiełuszko during the Toruń trial
- Political party: Unia Wolności

Edward Joachim Wende (16 August 1936 – 28 May 2002) was a Polish lawyer and politician, barrister, senator in the first and second terms, member of parliament in the third term.

== Education ==
His father was Edward Karol, a Warsaw lawyer, and his mother was Aniela née Ziółkowska, a history teacher. He was the grandson of the Evangelical-Augsburg pastor Edward Wende from Kalisz and the great-grandson of the well-known Warsaw bookseller and publisher Edward Wende.

After the Warsaw Uprising in 1944, his family returned to Kalisz. In 1953, he graduated from the Adam Asnyk High School in Kalisz, and in 1962 from the Faculty of Law of the Bolesław Bierut University of Wrocław.

For many years he practiced as a lawyer. In the 1970s and 1980s, he defended opposition activists in political trials. He represented Bronisław Geremek, Janusz Onyszkiewicz and Klemens Szaniawski in a civil trial against Jerzy Urban. He was also the representative of the auxiliary prosecutors in the trial of the killers of Father Jerzy Popiełuszko. In the years 1993–1997 and from 2001 until his death, he served as a judge of the State Tribunal.

In the years 1989–1993, he sat in the Senate of the 1st and 2nd term, obtaining a mandate on behalf of the Civic Committee and the Democratic Union, representing the Kalisz Voivodeship. In the Senate, among others, he chaired the Committee on Foreign Affairs. In the years 1997–2001, he held the mandate of a deputy to the Sejm of the 3rd term from the list of the Freedom Union.

He died of prostate cancer. He was buried next to his father and great-grandfather in the family grave at the Warsaw Evangelical-Augsburg Cemetery (al. 55, No. 18).

== Awards, distinctions and commemoration ==
In 2002 he was awarded the Commander's Cross of the Order of Polonia Restituta, and in 1993 he received the Officer's Cross of the Order of Merit of Luxembourg. He was also awarded the "Distinguished Advocate" badge.

In 2025, a road in the Żoliborz district of Warsaw was named after him.

== See also ==
- Maria Byrdy
- Jerzy Popiełuszko assassination trial

== Bibliography ==
- Edward Polanowski, ed. (1993), Szkoła Kaliska. Dzieje I Liceum Ogólnokształcącego im. Adama Asnyka w Kaliszu, Kalisz: Kaliskie Towarzystwo Przyjaciół Nauk
- "Edward Wende", sejm.gov.pl
- "Edward Wende", „Ludzie Wprost”
