= Pekarsky =

Pekarsky (masculine), Pekarskaya (feminine) is a Russian-language surname translated from Polish "Piekarski", derived from the occupation of piekarz, "baker". For emigrants, Pekarsky may be a unisex surname. Notable people with the surname include:

- Georgy Pekarsky (1866–1917) Russian navy captain 1st rank
- Mark Pekarsky (born 1940), Russian musician, orchestra director, music professor
- Mel Pekarsky, American artist and art educator
- Pyotr Pekarsky (1827–1872), Russian historian and bibliographer
- Stella Pekarsky, American politician
- Vikenty Pekarsky (1937–1994), Soviet cardiac surgeon
