= Piekarski =

Piekarski (feminine: Piekarska; plural: Piekarscy) is a Polish surname originated with several Polish noble Piekarski families. Its Russified form in Pekarsky. Notable people with the surname include:

- Frank Piekarski (1879–1951), American football player
- Grzegorz Piekarski (born 1986), Polish luger
- Julie Piekarski (born 1963), American actress
- Katarzyna Piekarska (born 1967), Polish politician
- Magdalena Piekarska (born 1986), Polish fencer
- Małgosia Piekarska (born 1954), Polish actress
- Marcin Piekarski (luger) (born 1983), Polish luger
- Mariusz Piekarski (born 1975), Polish footballer
- Michał Piekarski (died 1620), Polish attempted assassin
- Piotr Piekarski (athlete) (born 1964), Polish middle distance runner
- Piotr Piekarski (footballer) (born 1993), Polish footballer
- Wacław Piekarski (1893–1979), Polish military officer
- Yisroel Yitzchok Piekarski (1905–1993), Polish-American rabbi
