= Michał Czajkowski (Roman Catholic priest) =

Polish Catholic priest, biblical scholar, and ecumenist

- Born: Michał Franciszek Czajkowski; 3 October 1934; Chełmża, Poland
- Died: 15 February 2025 (aged 90); Wrocław, Poland
- Awards: Knight's Cross of the Order of Polonia Restituta
- Church: Latin Church
- Ordained: 15 June 1958
- Title: Bishop of the parish in Zgorzelec

Michał Czajkowski (3 October 1934 – 15 February 2025) was a Polish Roman Catholic priest, professor of theological sciences, and specialist in New Testament biblical studies. He was an ecumenist, former co-chair of the Polish Council of Christians and Jews, and a member of the International Auschwitz Council from 2000 to 2006. Czajkowski was also an unofficial collaborator with the Security Service of the Polish People's Republic during two periods: briefly in 1956 and from 1960 to 1984. He was the only Polish Catholic priest to publicly admit to collaborating with the Security Service.

== Biography ==
Michał Czajkowski was born on 3 October 1934 in Chełmża, Poland, into a large family, the son of Teofil, a railway worker, and Maria. He began primary school in Sierpc and completed it in Świdwin. He passed his secondary school exams in Gorzów Wielkopolski.

Czajkowski began his theological studies in 1953 at the Wrocław Metropolitan Higher Seminary. He also studied at the John Paul II Catholic University of Lublin, the Pontifical Biblical Institute and the Pontifical University of Saint Thomas Aquinas in Rome (1960–1964), and the École Biblique in Jerusalem (1964–1966). He earned his doctorate in 1966 from the Pontifical University of Saint Thomas Aquinas, with the degree recognised by the Academy of Catholic Theology in 1977. He completed his habilitation in 1987, became a professor at the Academy of Catholic Theology in 1992, and was appointed full professor in 1997.

He was ordained a priest on 15 June 1958 by Bishop Bolesław Kominek. From 1958 to 1959, he served as a curate and catechist in Oleśnica. Between 1967 and 1972, he was a lecturer at the Wrocław Seminary, rector of St. Martin's Church, and a pastoral minister in Wrocław. From 1972 to 1976, he was the parish priest in Zgorzelec. From 1976 until his retirement, he headed the Department of Ecumenical Theology at the Cardinal Stefan Wyszyński University (formerly Academy of Catholic Theology) in Warsaw.

Czajkowski reported on the proceedings of the Second Vatican Council for the Polish weekly Tygodnik Powszechny. He founded the St. Martin Community in Wrocław. He authored numerous publications on biblical theology and was a member of the Polish Episcopal Conference's Commissions for Dialogue with Non-Believers and with Judaism. From 2003 to 2005, he led the Department of Exegesis and Biblical Theology of the Old Testament at the University of Szczecin. He was also a member of the Collegium Invisibile.

Czajkowski reviewed numerous professorial promotions and habilitation dissertations at institutions including Academy of Catholic Theology, the Pontifical University of John Paul II in Kraków, the Christian Theological Academy in Warsaw, and John Paul II Catholic University of Lublin. He supervised many doctoral candidates, reviewed dozens of doctoral dissertations, and oversaw approximately 100 master's and licentiate theses, reviewing a similar number.

From 1984 to 2006, he served as the ecclesiastical assistant for the monthly magazine Więź and was a contributor to Tygodnik Powszechny. He resumed writing for Tygodnik Powszechny in March 2009. His articles also appeared in the quarterly Nigdy Więcej.

== Biblical scholar and ecumenist ==
Czajkowski was primarily a biblical scholar, focusing on the Synoptic Gospels and the Book of Revelation. His research also explored the role of the Bible in pastoral work and new biblical methodologies. His 1993 book, Egzystencjalna lektura Biblii (Existential Reading of the Bible), was a pioneering work globally, explaining the need for an existential approach to biblical interpretation. He noted that late 19th-century historical-critical methods often overlooked the Bible's existential value, a perspective highlighted by Rudolf Bultmann, from whom Czajkowski drew inspiration while developing his own unique method. In his Liturgical Agendas (1994–1996), he commented on biblical texts, reconstructing their Sitz im Leben. His book I Ty zrozumiesz Pismo Święte (And You Will Understand the Holy Scriptures) received numerous positive reviews, arguing that biblical reading requires a foundational knowledge base.

As an ecumenist, Czajkowski focused on the biblical foundations of ecumenism, a theme recurring in his publications. He was a translator for the Ecumenical Translation of Friends, a private ecumenical initiative aimed at encouraging churches to produce an official ecumenical translation. He organised four ecumenical symposia at the Academy of Catholic Theology and co-organised others with the Christian Theological Academy and the John Paul II Catholic University of Lublin. He argued that the difference between Catholics and Protestants lies in Catholics believing what the church teaches about Christ, while Protestants adhere solely to biblical teachings.

Czajkowski was deeply engaged in Christian-Jewish dialogue, rooted in biblical foundations. He wrote about the irresistibility of the Old Covenant and the Jewishness of Christ, working to overcome stereotypes in Polish society. He viewed antisemitism as a denial of Christianity and an attack on Christ himself. In 2018, he received the Father Stanisław Musiał Award for his contributions to Christian-Jewish dialogue.

== Collaboration with Polish People's Republic security services ==
Czajkowski's first contact with the security apparatus occurred during his studies at the Higher Seminary in Gościkowo-Paradyż. On 28 June 1956, in Poznań, shortly after the Poznań protests, he observed events while wearing a cassock. On 13 July 1956, he was summoned for questioning by the militia and directed to the Security Office. During the interview, he provided information about seminarians previously involved with the Union of Polish Youth and tensions among priests. He signed a collaboration agreement but withdrew it in writing on 28 August 1956.

In August 1960, Czajkowski was recruited again, under the pseudonym "Jankowski", through blackmail related to personal conduct. A 2023 report by Rzeczpospolita alleged that the blackmail involved accusations of pedophilia against two minors, which Czajkowski denied.

From October to December 1960, Security Service officer Mieczysław Mrozowicz met with Czajkowski eight times, extracting information and written profiles on dozens of priests. While some information was neutral, Czajkowski also reported on tensions among clergy, excessive card-playing, alcohol use, and other weaknesses. He provided details about the situation at the John Paul II Catholic University of Lublin and, while in Rome (1961–1962), corresponded with his handler, though without significant disclosures. The Ministry of the Interior and Administration intelligence service later took over, receiving reports on Polish priests in Rome. After returning to Poland, Czajkowski lectured at the Wrocław Seminary, supplying information about the church in Wrocław, including clergy disputes. His contacts with the Security Service weakened after becoming parish priest in Zgorzelec in 1972. In Warsaw, from 1976, he reported on the Academy of Catholic Theology while maintaining loose ties with opposition circles. His final handler was Adam Pietruszka (1977–1984), and Czajkowski received payments for his collaboration.

On 28 October 1984, Czajkowski ended his collaboration following the murder of Father Jerzy Popiełuszko, in which Pietruszka was implicated. Czajkowski told Pietruszka that the murder was an unforgivable "Cain-like crime" for a priest.

== Disclosure of collaboration ==
On 17 May 2006, Życie Warszawy, citing Security Service documents held by the Institute of National Remembrance, reported that Czajkowski, as "Jankowski", collaborated with the Security Service from 1960 to 1984. Institute of National Remembrance historian Jan Żaryn alleged that Czajkowski informed on Archbishop Bolesław Kominek, Father Jerzy Popiełuszko, Jacek Kuroń, and Jan Józef Lipski. This was supported by Tadeusz Witkowski, who noted that Pietruszka considered Czajkowski one of the Security Service's most valuable clerical agents. A special report by Więź editors, based on Institute of National Remembrance documents, interviews with Czajkowski, and others he allegedly informed on, was published alongside Czajkowski's statement. He admitted to some accusations but denied many details in his file:

My guilt is undeniable. It is difficult to justify this 24-year entanglement solely by the era, naivety, fear, or excessive openness. I showed weakness of character. The events surrounding me in recent weeks, including unfair and offensive interpretations, I accept as deserved penance.

In 2007, Witkowski revealed that materials from another collaborator, "Ignacy", were included in Czajkowski's file. In 2009, Czajkowski reiterated that he never informed on Popiełuszko, Kominek, Kuroń, or Lipski.

A Więź research team, including Andrzej Friszke, Anna Karoń-Ostrowska, Zbigniew Nosowski, and Tomasz Wiścicki, confirmed that Czajkowski was coerced into collaboration through blackmail in 1956 and 1960. Critics associated with Radio Maryja questioned the Więź report's impartiality, with Sebastian Karczewski arguing that it minimised Czajkowski's guilt.

After the disclosure, Czajkowski withdrew from public life. In 2017, Józef Puciłowski noted that Czajkowski was the only priest to admit to Security Service collaboration and apologise. He received no awards for 12 years until the 2018 Father Stanisław Musiał Award, which reignited attacks against him.

== Publications ==
By 2014, Czajkowski had published 1,074 works, including 23 books. Key works include:

- Słowo blisko ciebie: wędrowało po Biblii i biblistyce (Warsaw, 1983)
- Apokalipsa jako księga profetycznego orędzia napomnienia, pokrzepienia i nadziei (Wrocław, 1987)
- Lud Przymierza (Warsaw, 1992)
- Egzystencjalna lektura Biblii (Lublin, 1993)
- Agenda Liturgiczna Maryi Niepokalanej (1995–1997)
- Z komentarzami biblijnymi na każdy dzień roku. Rok C (Wrocław, 1994)
- Z komentarzami biblijnymi na każdy dzień roku. Rok A (Wrocław, 1995)
- Z komentarzami biblijnymi na każdy dzień roku. Rok B (Wrocław, 1997)
- I ty zrozumiesz Pismo Święte. Pierwsze wtajemniczenie w Biblię (Warsaw, 1996)
- Galilejskie spory Jezusa. Struktura kerygmatyczna Mk 2.1–3.6 (Warsaw, 1997)
- W drodze do Jerozolimy (Warsaw, 1996)
- Co nas łączy? ABC relacji chrześcijańsko-żydowskich (Warsaw, 2003)
- Żydzi i chrześcijanie. Wspólne dziedzictwo wiary (Toruń, 2004)

== Awards and honours ==
Czajkowski received numerous accolades, including:

- Two Christian and two Jewish ecumenical awards
- Minister of National Education Award
- Rector's awards
- Special Recognition Diploma from the Wrocław Enthusiasts Society
- Tęczowy Laur for combating minority discrimination
- Knight's Cross of the Order of Polonia Restituta (2004)
- Medal "Meritorious for Tolerance" (2001)
- Interfaith Gold Medallion "Peace through Dialogue" (ICCJ)
- Father Stanisław Musiał Award (2018)
- Honorary Citizen of Świdwin, conferred on 6 May 1996

== Bibliography ==
- Warzecha, Julian, ed. (2004). "Życiorys i sylwetka Jubilata" [Biography and Profile of the Jubilarian]. Słowo pojednania. Księga Pamiątkowa z okazji siedemdziesiątych urodzin Księdza Michała Czajkowskiego [Word of reconciliation. Commemorative book for the 70th birthday of Fr Michał Czajkowski; Biography and profile of the honoree] (in Polish). Warsaw: Więź. ISBN 83-88032-75-5.
