= Piotr Piekarski (footballer) =

Polish footballer

Personal information
- Full name: Piotr Piekarski
- Date of birth: 26 June 1993 (age 33)
- Place of birth: Lublin, Poland
- Height: 1.82 m (6 ft 0 in)
- Position: Midfielder

Team information
- Current team: Świt Nowy Dwór Mazowiecki
- Number: 8

Youth career
- Motor Lublin
- –2010: Widok Lublin
- 2010–2012: GKS Bełchatów

Senior career*
Years	Team	Apps	(Gls)
2011–2013	GKS Bełchatów	6	(0)
2013	→ Polonia Warsaw (loan)	1	(0)
2013–2014	Termalica Bruk-Bet	13	(4)
2014–2017	Motor Lublin	76	(14)
2017–2018	Avia Świdnik	27	(2)
2018	Chełmianka Chełm	16	(1)
2019–2021	Pelikan Łowicz	63	(17)
2021–2025	Chełmianka Chełm	104	(9)
2025–	Świt Nowy Dwór Mazowiecki	30	(4)

International career
2010	Poland U17	1	(0)
2012	Poland U20	6	(1)
- * Club domestic league appearances and goals as of 23:47, 3 June 2026 (UTC)

Piotr Piekarski (born 26 June 1993) is a Polish professional footballer who plays as a midfielder for III liga club Świt Nowy Dwór Mazowiecki.

== Honours ==
Motor Lublin

- III liga Lublin–Subcarpathia: 2015–16

Chełmianka Chełm

- Polish Cup (Lublin regionals): 2021–22
