= Maria Byrdy =

Polish physician (1910–1997)

- Born: 5 January 1910; Biała Krakowska, Poland
- Died: 4 November 1997 (aged 87)
- Education: Jagiellonian University Medical College
- Known for: Testimony and autopsy regarding the assassination of Jerzy Popiełuszko

Maria Byrdy (5 January 1910 – 4 November 1997) was a Polish physician, founder of the Department of Forensic Medicine at the Medical Academy in Białystok, long-time academic teacher, honorary doctorate from the Medical Academy in Białystok.

== Biography ==
Byrdy's father died on the front lines of World War I while serving in the Austrian army. From 1929, she studied at the Faculty of Medicine of the Jagiellonian University in Krakow (during the holidays she worked as a nurse at the Anti-Glaucoma Institute in Witkowice and at the Treatment Centre for children with bone tuberculosis in Zakopane), obtaining her medical degree there on 17 September 1936.

She completed her medical internship at the Bonifraters Hospital in Krakow and the Silesian Hospital in Cieszyn, and then in 1937 she took up a position as a junior assistant at the Department of Forensic Medicine at the Jagiellonian University. In January 1939, she obtained her doctorate with a dissertation entitled 'Anatomical changes in the thyroid gland in cases of death from burns'.

She then took up a position at the Jagiellonian University Internal Medicine Clinic, and after the outbreak of war, at the Department of Forensic Medicine in Krakow. After the war, she worked at the same department as a senior assistant and then as an assistant professor. In 1954, she obtained the rank of associate professor, and in November of that year she came to Białystok, where she took up the position of Head of the Department of Forensic Medicine at the local Medical Academy.

She was a member of the Polish Medical Association and the executive board of the Polish Society of Forensic Medicine and Criminology, and since 1976, a member of the Académie Internationale de Médecine Légale et de Médecine Sociale.

She issued a forensic medical opinion on the circumstances surrounding the death of Father Jerzy Popiełuszko in 1984, the content of which was criticised.

On 1 June 1990, she received the title of doctor honoris causa of the Medical Academy in Białystok, and in 1992 the Senate of the Jagiellonian University in Kraków renewed her medical diploma. In 1995, she received the medal of Professor Kitasato from Japan for her pioneering work in the field of forensic medicine.

== Bibliography ==
- "Historia Medycyny Profesor Maria Byrdy – okres krakowski". OIL w Białymstoku.
