= Assassination of Jerzy Popiełuszko =

1984 murder in Włocławek, Poland

- Part of the persecution of Catholics in Polish People's Republic
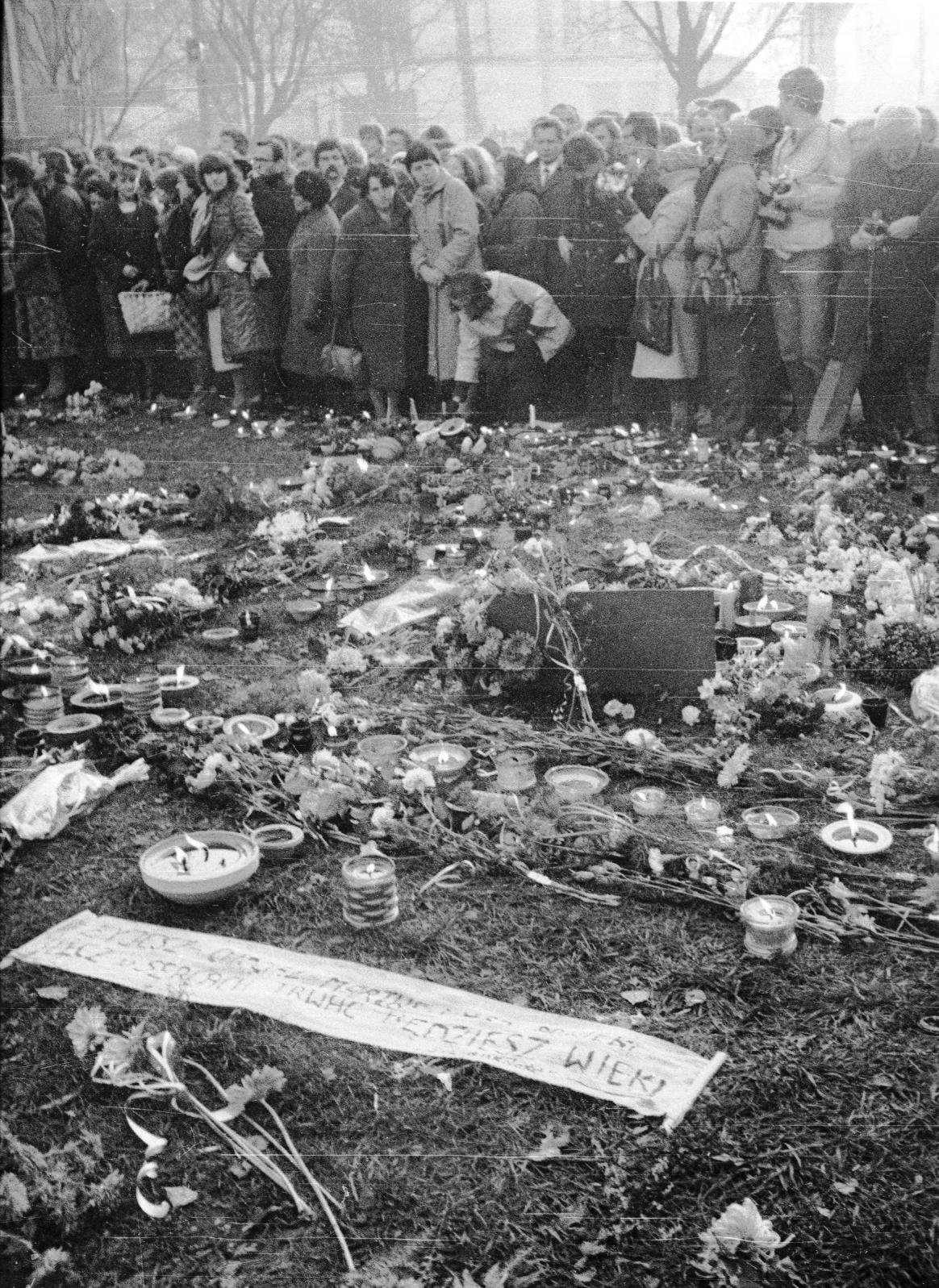
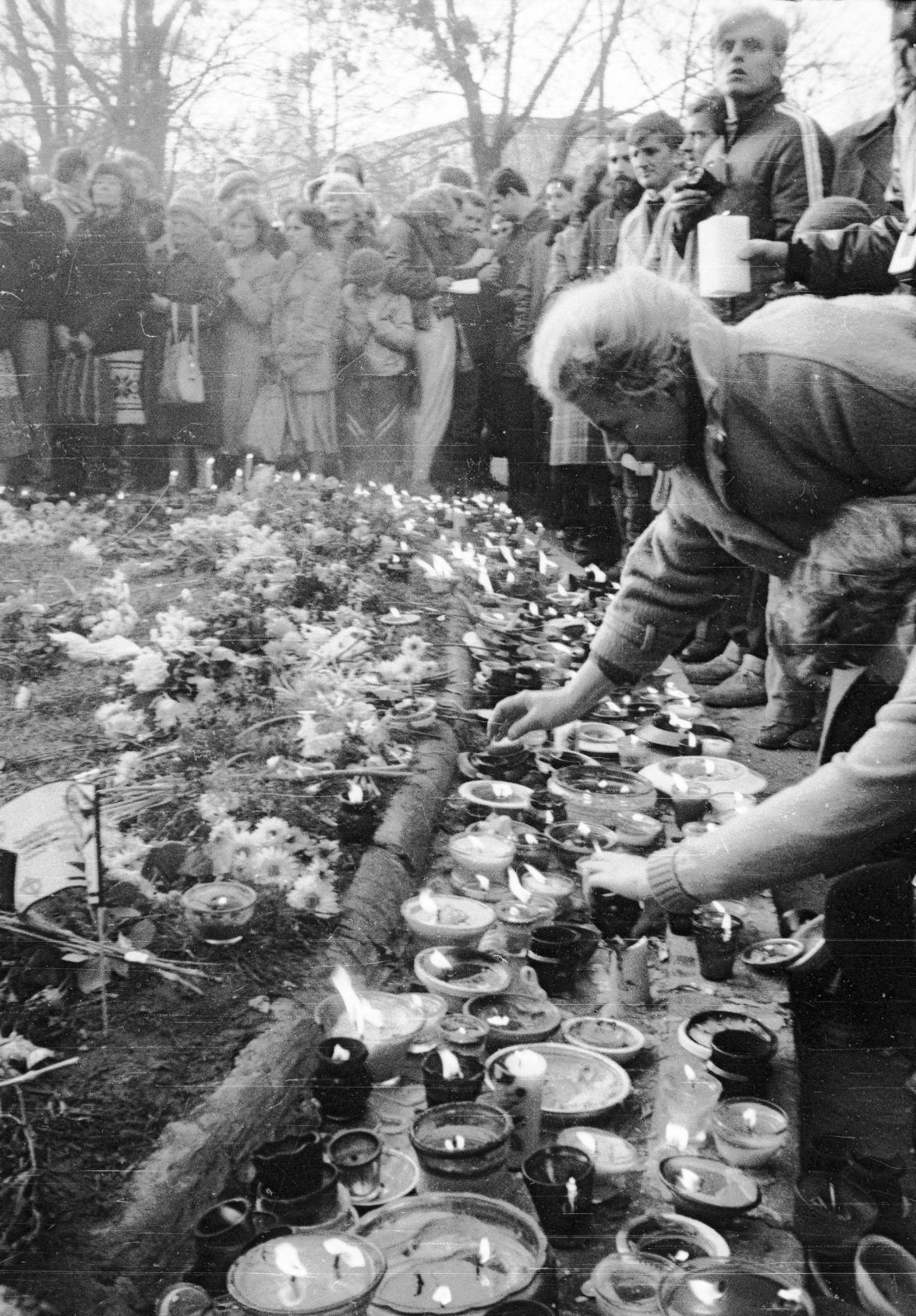
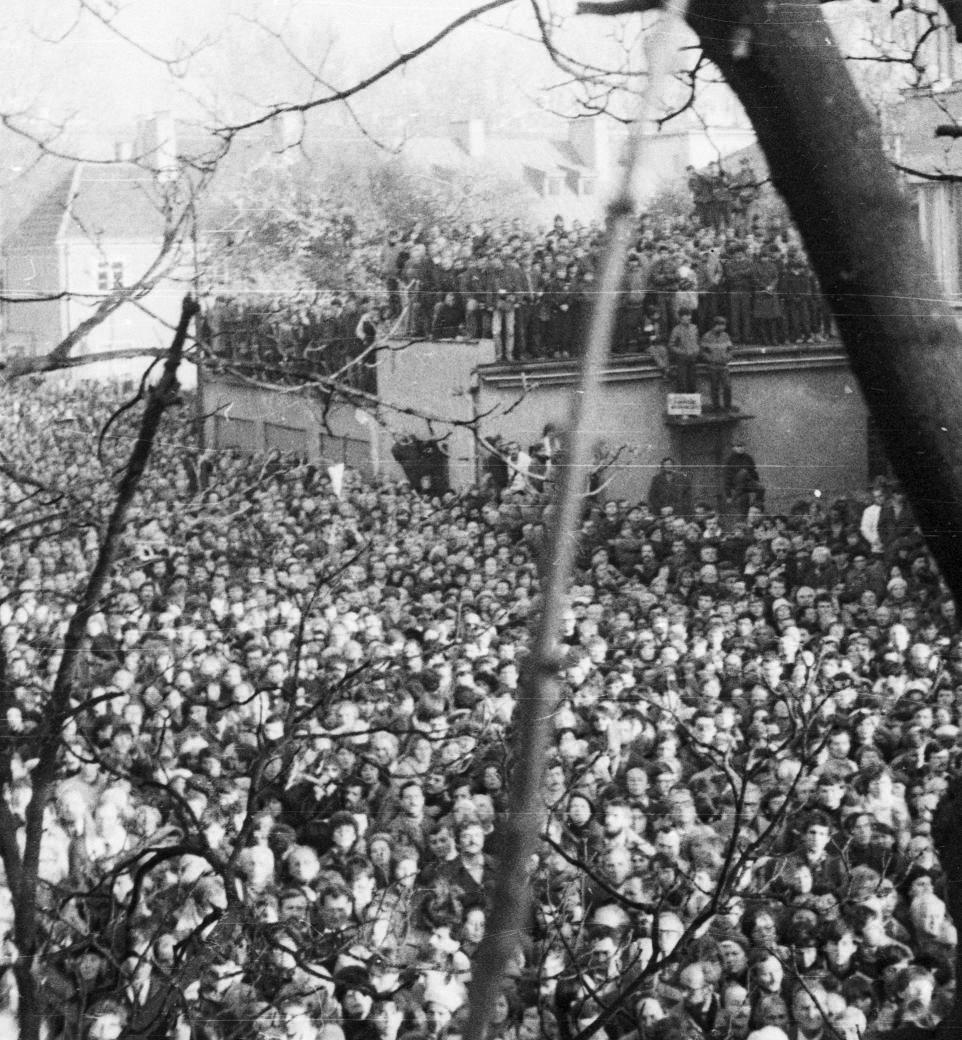
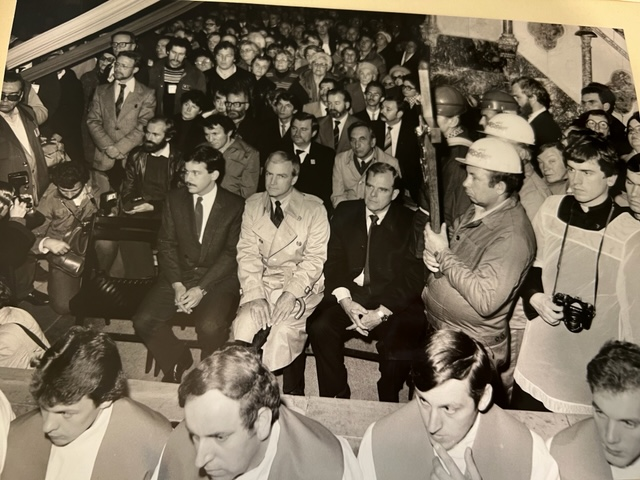
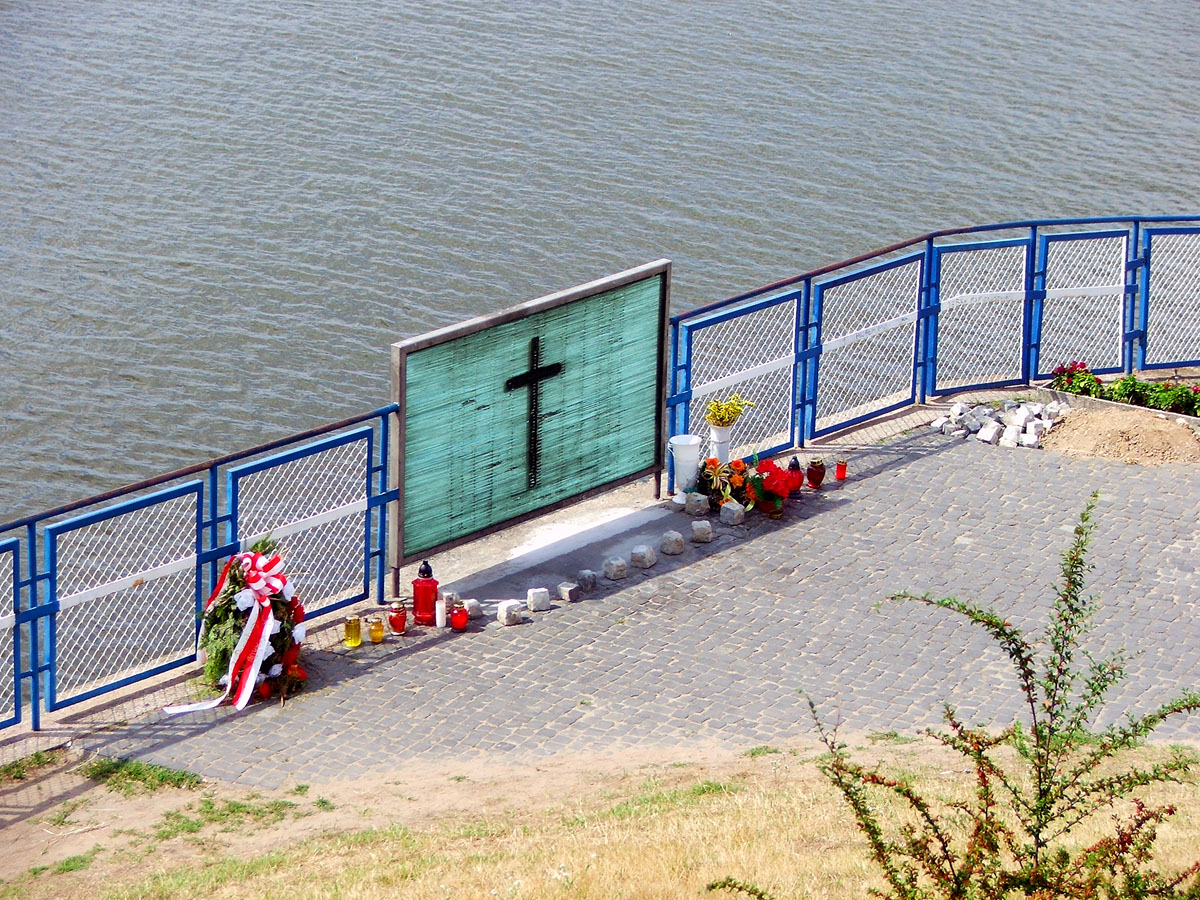
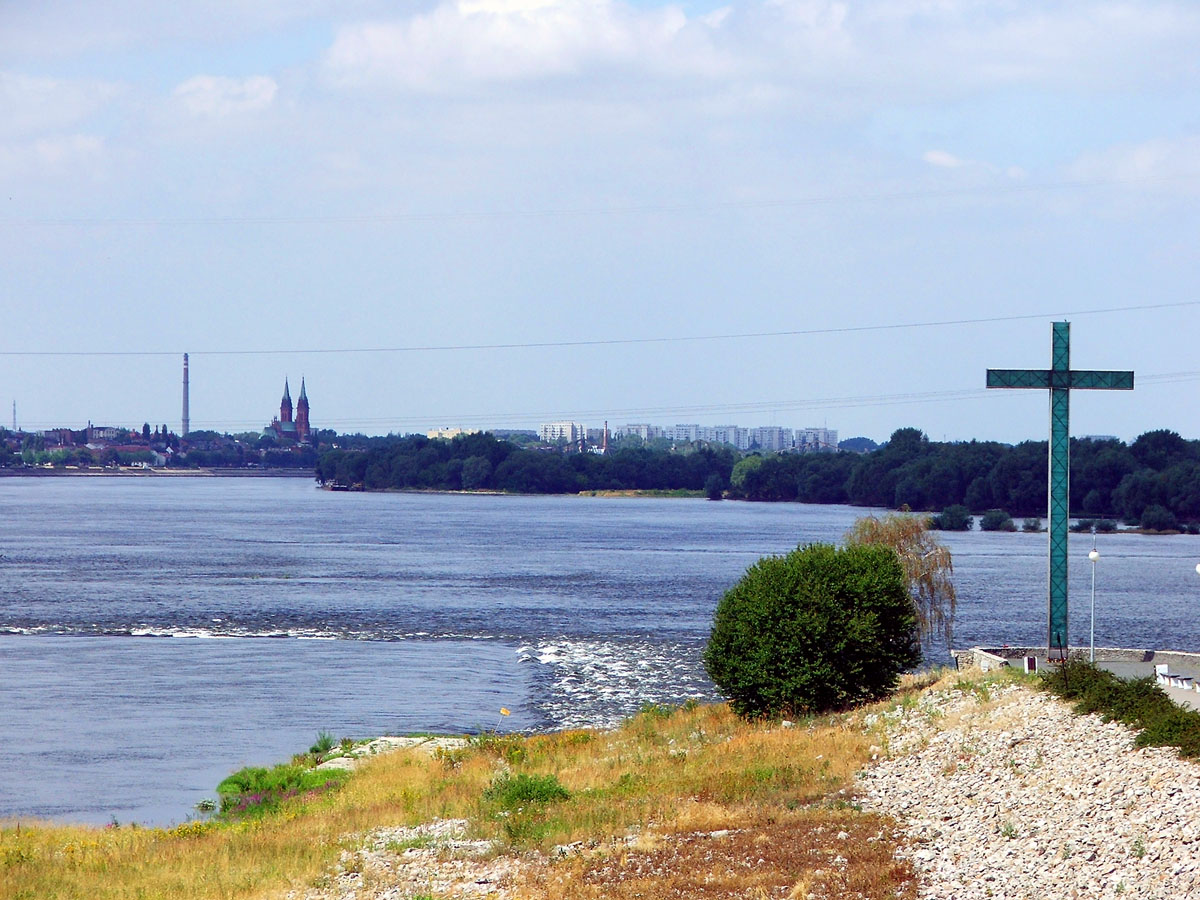
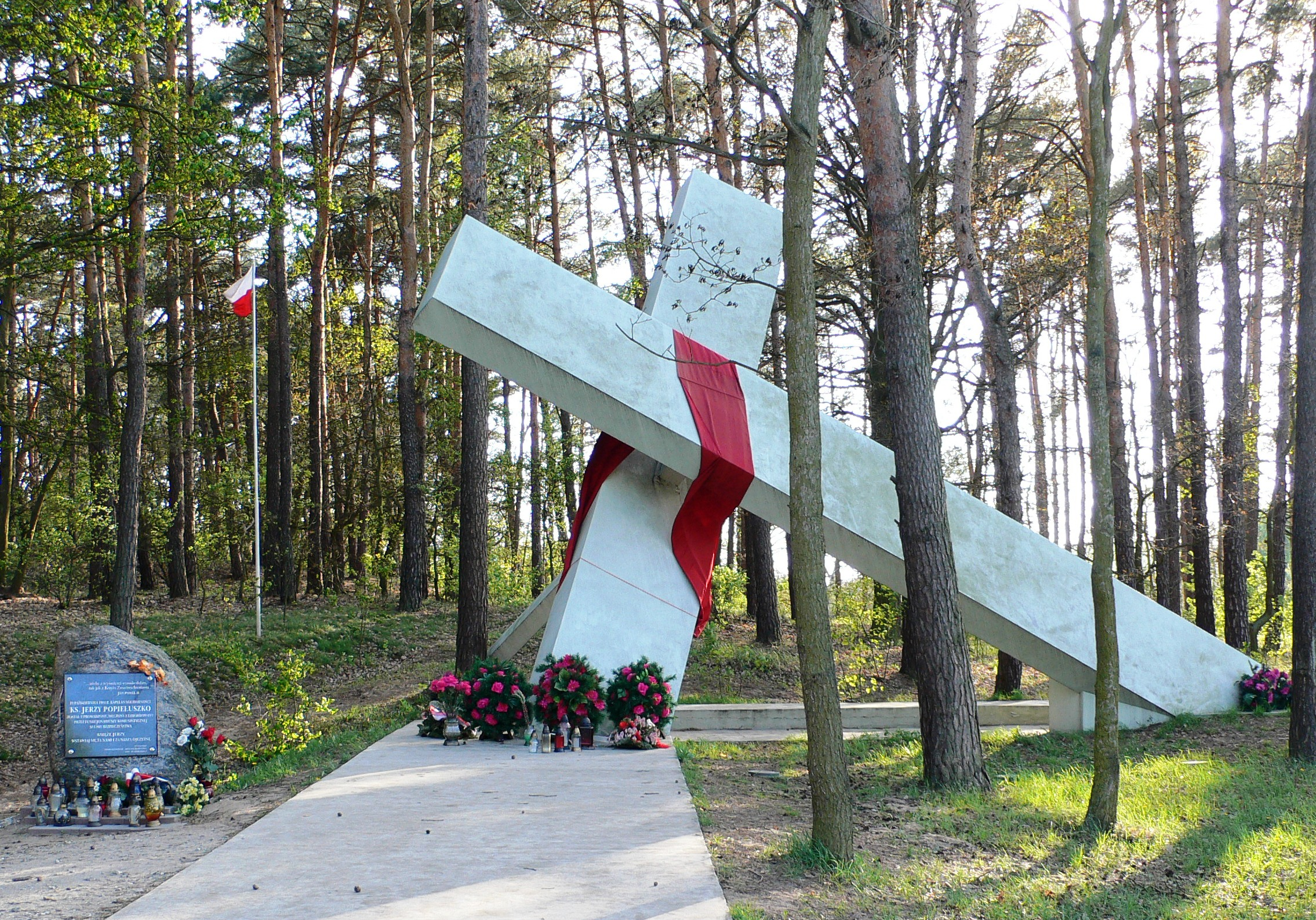
- Top and second row: Photos of Father Jerzy's funeral service held at St. Stanislaus Kostka Church. Third row: John R. Davis Jr. was attending mass during the first anniversary of Father Jerzy's assassination, October 1985. Bottom row, left to right: A memorial on the dam in Włocławek commemorating the assassination of Father Jerzy; the panoramic photo of Father Jerzy's cross monument in Włocławek; and the cross commemorating the assassination of Father Jerzy in Górsk
- Location: In the village of Górsk, Poland (kidnapping and assault); Vistula River, Włocławek, Poland (disposal and discovery)
- Date: 19 October 1984; 42 years ago approx. 10 p.m. (CET; UTC+01:00)
- Target: Jerzy Popiełuszko
- Attack type: Beating, strangulation, and possibly drowning
- Weapons: Batons and a rope
- Deaths: 1 (Father Jerzy)
- Injuries: 1 (Chrostowski)
- Victims: Father Jerzy and Waldemar Chrostowski
- Perpetrators: Grzegorz Piotrowski, Leszek Pękala, Waldemar Chmielewski, and Adam Pietruszka
- Charges: Five charges: abduction; aiding and abetting; torture; homicide; abuse of power

On the night of 19 October 1984, 37-year-old Polish Catholic priest Jerzy Popiełuszko was attacked, kidnapped, and killed by three agents of the Polish Security Service, the communist counterintelligence agency in Polish People's Republic, who were disguised as traffic police.

The perpetrators who were responsible for and involved in the death of Father Jerzy were Grzegorz Piotrowski, Leszek Pękala, and Waldemar Chmielewski, along with Adam Pietruszka aiding and abetting it although he was not involved in the assassination. One of the perpetrators, Piotrowski, who was the ringleader of the crime, confessed that he hit Father Jerzy with a baton repeatedly and was sentenced to 25 years in prison.

Father Jerzy's funeral was held on 3 November 1984. A multitude of 600,000 to 1 million people, including Lech Wałęsa, attended his funeral to pay respects for his death.

The assassination was one of many major incidents in communist Poland that had sparked outrage and became a progressive cause of the communist regime's collapse, and it also remains one of the notorious crimes, along with the murder of Grzegorz Przemyk.

== Background ==
=== Father Jerzy ===
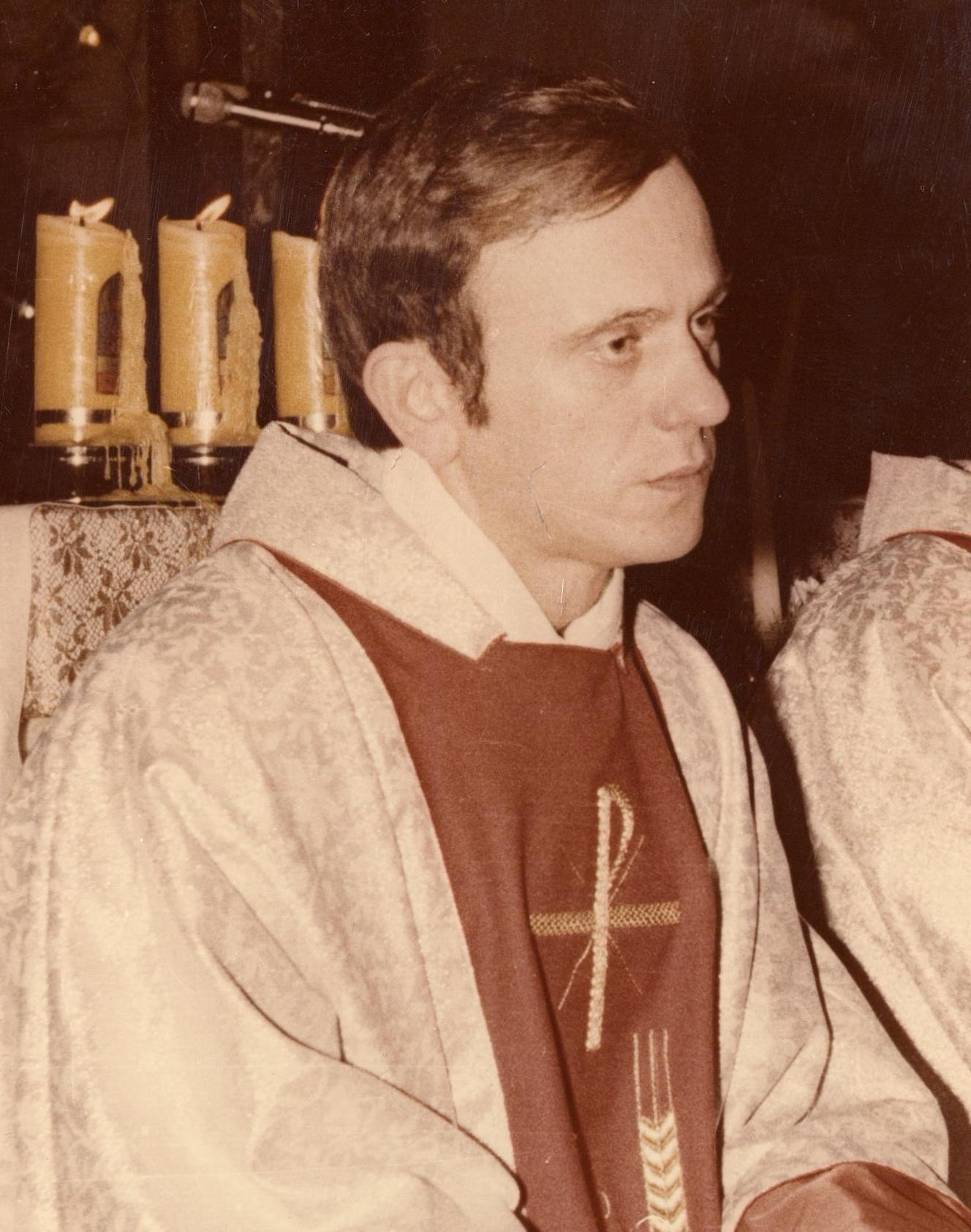
Father Jerzy Popiełuszko, the chaplain of Solidarity trade movement

Father Jerzy (born Alfons in Okopy; 14 September 1947 – 19 October 1984) was an unwavering ally of the Solidarity against communism as he visited workers who were striking at the Warsaw Steelworks. He became the unofficial chaplain of the Solidarity trade union as Father Jerzy aligned himself to oppose communists who were in power since the end of World War II.

During the Holy Masses for the homeland held at St. Stanislaus Kostka Church in Warsaw, Father Jerzy had attracted multitude of people from January 1982. Because of this, the sermons Father Jerzy had given were broadcast by Radio Free Europe which they promoted non-violent resistance against communist regime and criticized the use of martial law by the government. The communist Polish authorities, specifically the Ministry of Internal Affairs, were subjecting Father Jerzy to constant surveillance and harassment due to the latter being perceived as a direct threat.

=== Piotrowski ===
Piotrowski (born 3 May 1951 in Łódź), unlike most Polish people who grew up devoutly religious including Father Jerzy, was raised in an atheist household, which was departed from this devoutly religious country.

Little known before the murder, Piotrowski was admitted to the Faculty of Electrical Engineering at the University of Łódź in 1968 but was rejected that year. Therefore, Piotrowski took a job at the Electrical Machinery Plant (Zakład Maszyn Elektrycznych, „EMIT”), then re-applied to Łódź a year later

Then from December 1982 to February 1983, Piotrowski led the Group "D" (Grupa „D”) at the Ministry of Internal Affairs as a captain, and he was responsible for the persecution of Catholic Church in Poland.

== Assassination of Father Jerzy Popiełuszko ==
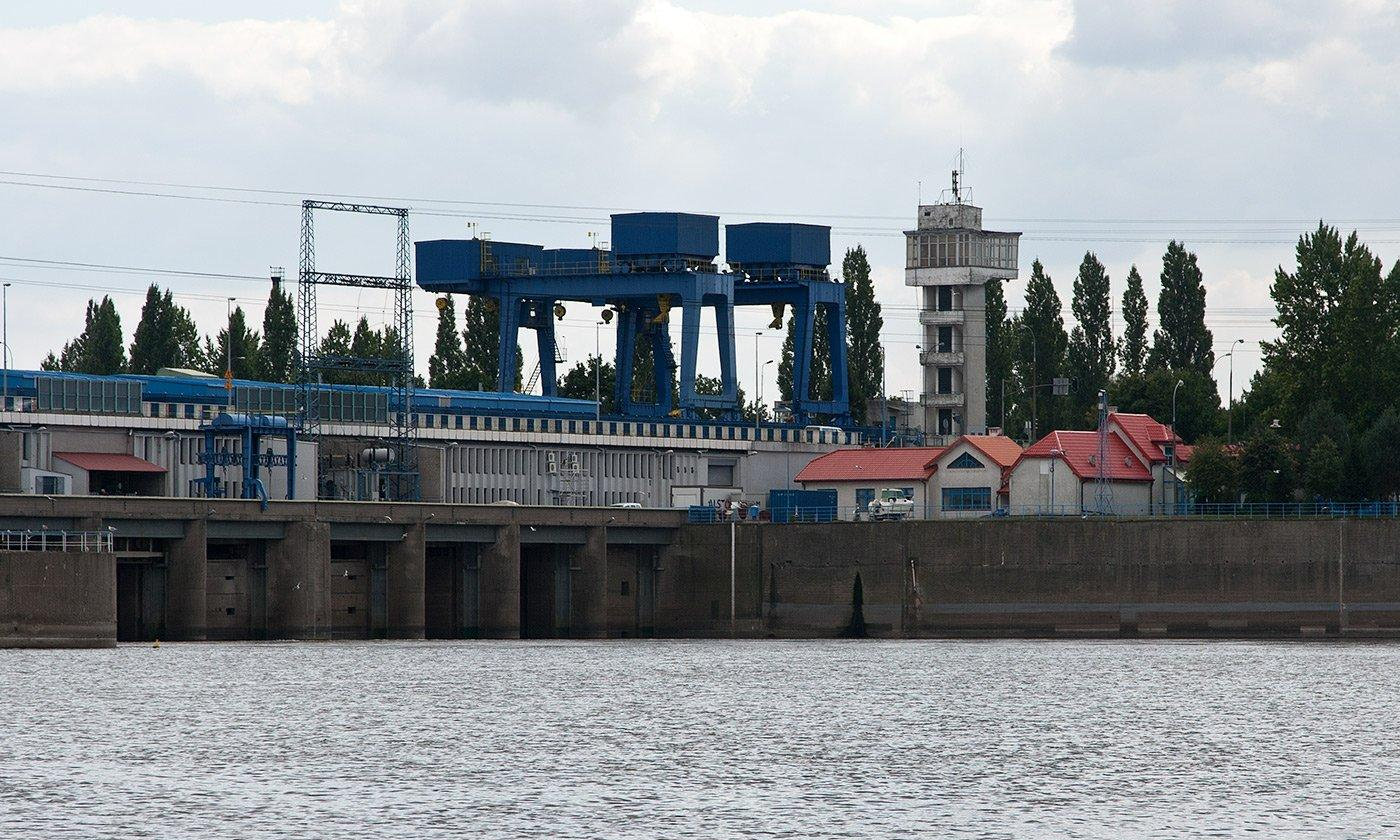
The dam where Father Jerzy's body was being thrown down to the Vistula River amidst the power plants.

=== "Popiel" ===
Prior to his assassination from 26 July 1982, "Popiel" was the case file that began operative work against Father Jerzy.

Apart from his personal information–his address, profession, family–, Father Jerzy became the person of interest because of his association with Solidarity and the church charity he hosted to provide medicine while travelling abroad as he participated in anti-socialist activities. Its purpose is to put an end to his support of communities and organizations "hostile to People's Republic of Poland."

=== Attempted assassination ===
The attempted assassination occurred on 13 October, roughly a week prior to his death, when Father Jerzy was returning from Gdańsk to Warsaw in a car, Piotrowski wanted to stage an accident but he missed. Therefore, the assassination failed. However, Piotrowski did not act alone as it was only taken against Father Jerzy by the officers in the 4th Department of the Ministry of Internal Affairs.

=== Last public appearance ===
Roughly a week later, Father Jerzy was last seen in public when he was at a meeting of the Working People's Chaplaincy in Bydogoszcz. He then uttered his memorable and final words before heading back home: "Let us pray that we may be free from fear [and] intimidation, but above all from the lust for retaliation and violence" or "May the evangelical principles of justice and social charity direct the actions of all the people of our country. Amen." It was a testament as Father Jerzy prayed for freedom and forgave the guilty.

=== Successful assassination ===
Approximately at 10 PM, 42-year-old man Waldemar Chrostowski drove Father Jerzy home. However, Father Jerzy and his driver were intercepted by three of the ostensible traffic police–unbeknownst to him that they were agents working for Security Service in the village of Górsk, near the city of Toruń. Father Jerzy was detained while the driver was handcuffed. Then, Father Jerzy was brutally attacked as he was being stunned with a blow to the head and gagged. On the other hand, Chrostowski escaped from the scene to avoid being kidnapped along with Father Jerzy, then alerted the police and sought help at a nearby workers' hotel. However, Father Jerzy was the one being kidnapped as he was locked in the trunk. Somehow, Father Jerzy pried open the trunk; however, the car continued along its destination, causing Father Jerzy to struggle. One of the perpetrators also prepared baton to beat him to death. After being kidnapped, Father Jerzy was beaten to death and tied so he would not make any sudden move. His body then was thrown into the Vistula River with a bag of stones tied to one of his leg. The perpetrators then drove away from the scene. Pekala uttered "Now we are all murderers" after realizing his violent nature.

Since Chrostowski survived the incident, he witnessed to the police and told them that he was ordered into a Fiat where he was handcuffed and gagged. Then he heard Father Jerzy asking to the agents: "Gentleman, what are you doing?" It appears that Father Jerzy was being thrown into the trunk followed by the question.

The assassination had sparked outrage in Poland and became a major cause of the communist regime's downfall.

==== Body discovery ====
Roughly 10 days after the search for the body, the Militia divers found Father Jerzy's dredged body in Włocławek near the reservoir. The injuries were severe that Father Jerzy was only identified by his distinctive features. Grzegorz Kalwarczyk helped identify the body of Father Jerzy and reported that his face was "like a pulp." Not only his face was mashed, but his eyes were blackened, as well as the fingers and toes were brownish-red in appearance. Therefore, they were rotten in places. His nephew Marek (who was 14 years old at the time of Father Jerzy's death) also noticed that his uncle's body was barely recognizable that there was "not even one part of his body which looked like Uncle Jerzy."

The stone that was used to weigh down Father Jerzy's body is displayed at the Basilica of Saint Bartholomew on the Island (San Bartolomeo all'Isola) in Rome.

== Aftermath ==
=== Funeral service ===
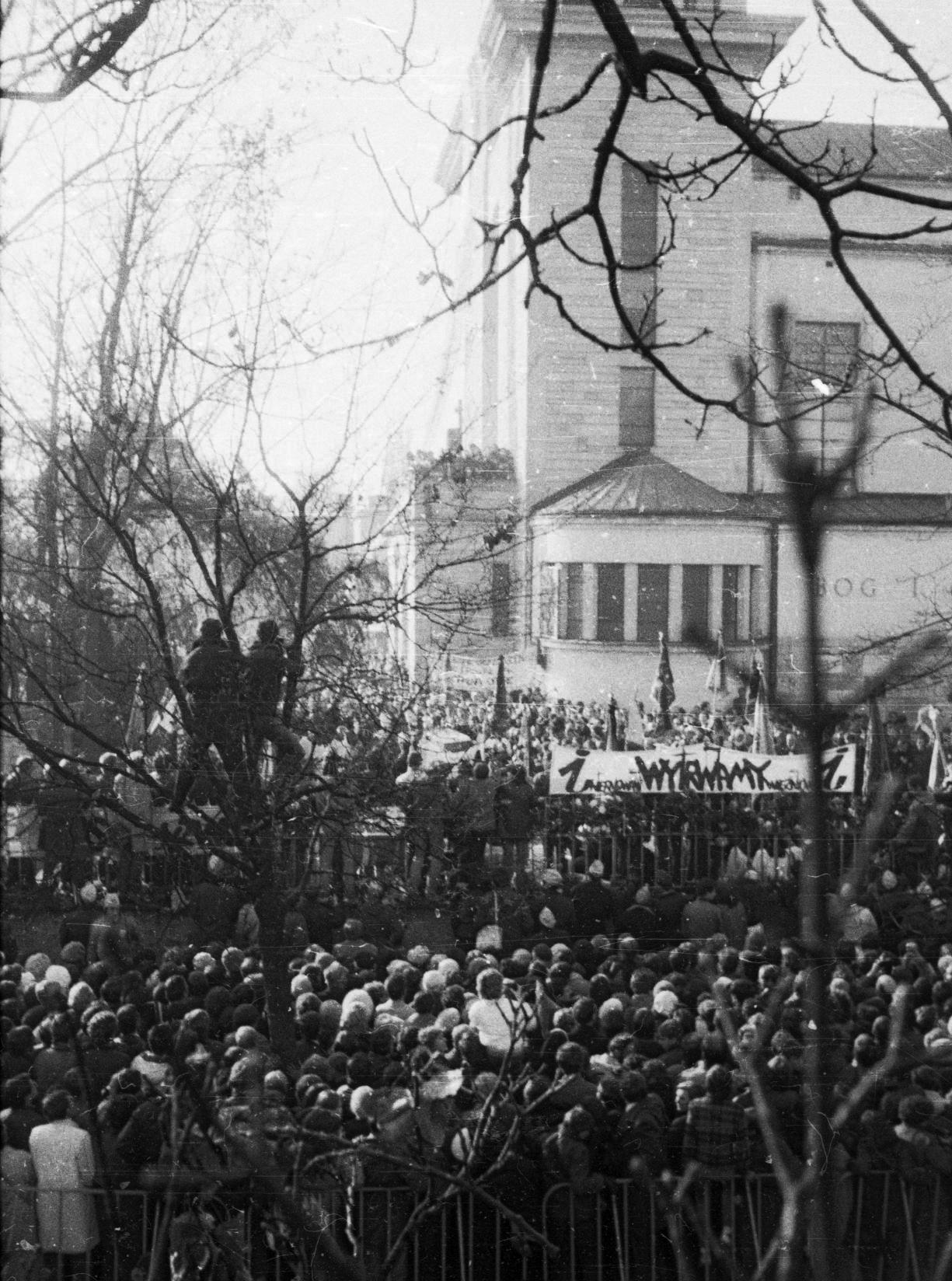
Funeral service of Father Jerzy

On 3 November 1984, 600,000 to 1 million people had attended Father Jerzy's funeral at the open-air mass in front of St. Stanislaus Kostka Church, even the official estimate had to concede. As the crowds gathered, they were singing the nationalist church anthem, "May God watch over Poland."

Solidarity leader Lech Wałęsa urged the Polish community that the funeral should be peaceful so the latter would not start a riot or act belligerent towards the antagonizing officers. Instead of acting belligerent, the crowds who were attending the funeral chanted that they forgave the officers for the murder of Father Jerzy. Celebrating the funeral of Father Jerzy inside the church, the priest announced uttering that "Father Jerzy is among the blessed today." When the bell chimed, Father Jerzy's coffin was carried into the churchyard. Then, his coffin was lowered into a bricked-line grave.

The authorities in Poland suggested that Father Jerzy's body should be buried in the village he was born and raised in, Okopy. Okopy is a small village that is 20 miles away from the Soviet border. However, the authorities instead yielded to the church's request for a Warsaw funeral.

=== Chrostowski being hospitalized ===
For three days, Chrostowski was held at an Interior Ministry hospital, and he was hospitalized for severe bruising and other injuries sustained during the escape.

== The motives for the assassination and the arrests, sentencing, and release of Piotrowski, Pękala, Chmielewski, and Pietruszka ==
After Father Jerzy's assassination and body discovery, there are various motives by these perpetrators that led to the assassination of Father Jerzy. One of the reasons the perpetrators had a motive to kill Father Jerzy was that thousands of accumulating people attended the Mass for the Fatherland was well known not only in Warsaw, but spreading across Poland, sometimes 15,000 to 20,000 of people.

Poland's President Gen. Wojciech Jaruzelski was facing pressure from the Church and the Polish people. As he was facing pressure, Jaruzelski was forced to answer in reprisal of Father Jerzy's death. Therefore, Piotrowski, Pękala, Chmielewski, and Pietruszka were taken custody as they were responsible for the murder. Piotrowski was sentenced to 25 years in prison for "a brutal death" of Father Jerzy; Pekala received 15 years of sentencing for getaway driving in aid of abducting Father Jerzy; Chmielewski received 14 years of sentencing; and Pietruszka received 25 years of sentencing for denying the accusations that he abetted the killing. Piotrowski, openly confessed that he had approached and "hit [Father Jerzy] on the head several times with the stick." The perpetrators however were released shortly after amnesty.

Perpetrators	Sentencing they received (years)
Pietruszka	25 years
Piotrowski	25 years
Pękala	15 years
Chmielewski	14 years

== Forensic evidence regarding autopsy ==
There are transcripts and forensic evidence involving autopsy that led to the cause of Father Jerzy's death, especially during the Toruń trial.

One year after the death of Father Jerzy, Maria Byrdy (75 years old at that time)–who specified in forest medicine–suggested in "East Europe Report, Political, Sociological and Military Affairs" that, in one example, the fustian rags were wrapped around the truncheon (clubs) as the former prevent "abrasion of the epidermis" while the clubs were "fairly heavy." While the weapon was wielded with adequate force, it could lead to serious effects including bruises that vary and the loss of consciousness. In addition to truncheons and fustian rags, Byrdy also analyzed the death of Father Jerzy that, in response to attorney Jan Olszewski's question on how Father Jerzy's body being placed in a trunk along with sack of stones tied to it caused suffocation, whenever Father Jerzy made a move while in that position, the position of the loop could shift, exerting pressure on the larynx and the vein. Byrdy then speculated that if Father Jerzy were to be abandoned in the forest, he would be bound to die. On the other hand, regardless if he were to recover consciousness and if Father Jerzy struggled, then the loop would be tightened that would more likely to cause him to asphyxiate.

== Media references to the assassination of Father Jerzy Popiełuszko ==
There are various media regarding the kidnapping and murder of Popiełuszko that it is made to be a primary subject:

- Popieluszko: Freedom Is Within Us, a 2009 film based on Father Jerzy's life, especially his martyrdom.
- To Kill a Priest, a 1988 film à clef film directed by Agnieszka Holland that illustrates a murder of a fictionalized priest depicting Father Jerzy.
- "Bassoon Concerto," a 1985 bassoon concerto performed by Andrej Panufnik that is dedicated to Father Jerzy to pay respect for his martyrdom.
- "Błogosławiony ksiądz Jerzy Popiełuszko," a 2016 song by Agnieszka Przekupień, Marcin Januszkiewicz, and Michał Bogdanowicz, composed by Piotr Rubik, discussing how Father Jerzy's body was desecrated, but his spirit remains untouched and is from the 2016 oratorio, Because of My Name, which also illustrates the aspects of Father Jerzy's martyrdom.
- Jerzy Popieluszko: Messenger of the Truth, a 2013 documentary film focusing on the life and martyrdom of a priest.
- The Deliberate Death of a Polish Priest, a 1985 play that includes a transcript of the trial of Popiełuszko's murderers
- Manufacturing Consent, an 1988 book, authored by Edward S. Herman and Noam Chomsky, has Father Jerzy's murder and media coverage as a case study of "propaganda model."

== See also ==
- Murder of Grzegorz Przemyk
- Grzegorz Piotrowski
- Security Service (Poland)
