= Leszek Pękala =

Security Service officer (born 1952)

- Born: 30 May 1952 (age 73); Złotoryja, Poland
- Allegiance: Security Service (formerly)
- Branch: Department IV; Department VIII
- Known for: One of the assassins of Jerzy Popiełuszko

Leszek Pękala (born 30 May 1952 in Złotoryja) is a former officer of Milicja Obywatelska and a former officer (with the rank of lieutenant) in the Security Service of the Polish People's Republic. After the assassination of Father Jerzy Popiełuszko, chaplain of the Warsaw Solidarity movement, he was found guilty of murder by the court, sentenced to 15 years' imprisonment, and demoted to the rank of private.

== Education ==
An electronics engineer by education. He joined the Security Service on 1 October 1977. He worked at the Provincial Headquarters of the Citizens' Militia in Tarnów. In 1979, he completed postgraduate studies at the Higher Officer School in Legionowo. Until 1981, he was the head of a section at the Provincial Headquarters of the Citizens' Militia in Tarnów, after which he was transferred to work in Department VIII of the Ministry of Internal Affairs as an inspector.

Co-defendant, along with Grzegorz Piotrowski and Waldemar Chmielewski, in the October 1984 murder of Jerzy Popiełuszko. As a result, on 31 October 1984, he was dismissed on disciplinary grounds and demoted to the rank of private.

In the so-called "Toruń trial," which took place from 27 December 1984 to 7 February 1985, before the Provincial Court in Toruń, he was sentenced to 15 years in prison. Leszek Pękala, after his sentence was reduced as a result of two amnesties, was released from prison after serving 6 years, in 1990. He later changed his surname.
