= Waldemar Chmielewski (Polish officer) =

Polish Security Service officer (1955–2023)

- Born: 28 February 1955; Warsaw, Poland
- Died: 5 September 2023 (aged 68) Warsaw
- Allegiance: Security Service (formerly)
- Branch: Department IV (formerly)
- Service years: 1976–1984
- Known for: One of the assassins of Jerzy Popiełuszko

Waldemar Marek Chmielewski (28 February 1955 – 5 September 2023 in Warsaw) was a former Security Service officer with the rank of lieutenant, employee of Independent Group “D” of Department IV of the Ministry of Internal Affairs, found guilty by the court of the murder of Father Jerzy Popiełuszko and sentenced to 14 years’ imprisonment and demoted, as were his co-defendants Captain Grzegorz Piotrowski and Lieutenant Leszek Pękala.

== Early life and education ==
Son of Zenon and Jadwiga and a political scientist by education, Chmielewski defended his master's thesis entitled Cardinal Stefan Wyszyński – selected issues from his political and social activities, written under the supervision of Col. Ryszard Wójcicki, PhD, in September 1984 at the Academy of Internal Affairs.

Chmielewski began his service in the Milicji Obywatelskiej in July 1976. He was a member of the Polish United Workers' Party (PZPR), but was expelled from the party after his demotion. He was arrested on 26 October 1984. On 31 October of the same year, he was dismissed from service on disciplinary grounds and demoted to the rank of private. By a judgment of the court in Toruń of 7 February 1985, he was sentenced to 14 years' imprisonment. Under an amnesty, the sentence was reduced to 4.5 years. After his release from prison on 24 April 1989, he changed his name. In 1993, he returned to prison for six months because it turned out that his sentence had been reduced without justification.

== Orders and decorations ==
- Cross of Merit

== See also ==
- Grzegorz Piotrowski
- Leszek Pękala
