= 1984 =

1984 in various calendars
- Gregorian calendar: 1984; MCMLXXXIV
- Ab urbe condita: 2737
- Armenian calendar: 1433; ԹՎ ՌՆԼԳ
- Assyrian calendar: 6734
- Baháʼí calendar: 140–141
- Balinese saka calendar: 1905–1906
- Bengali calendar: 1390–1391
- Berber calendar: 2934
- British Regnal year: 32 Eliz. 2 – 33 Eliz. 2
- Buddhist calendar: 2528
- Burmese calendar: 1346
- Byzantine calendar: 7492–7493
- Chinese calendar: 癸亥年 (Water Pig); 4681 or 4474 — to — 甲子年 (Wood Rat); 4682 or 4475
- Coptic calendar: 1700–1701
- Discordian calendar: 3150
- Ethiopian calendar: 1976–1977
- Hebrew calendar: 5744–5745
- Hindu calendars
- Vikram Samvat: 2040–2041
- Shaka Samvat: 1905–1906
- Kali Yuga: 5084–5085
- Holocene calendar: 11984
- Igbo calendar: 984–985
- Iranian calendar: 1362–1363
- Islamic calendar: 1404–1405
- Japanese calendar: Shōwa 59 (昭和５９年)
- Javanese calendar: 1916–1917
- Juche calendar: 73
- Julian calendar: Gregorian minus 13 days
- Korean calendar: 4317
- Minguo calendar: ROC 73 民國73年
- Nanakshahi calendar: 516
- Thai solar calendar: 2527
- Tibetan calendar: ཆུ་མོ་ཕག་ལོ་ (female Water-Boar); 2110 or 1729 or 957 — to — ཤིང་ཕོ་བྱི་བ་ལོ་ (male Wood-Rat); 2111 or 1730 or 958
- Unix time: 441763200 – 473385599

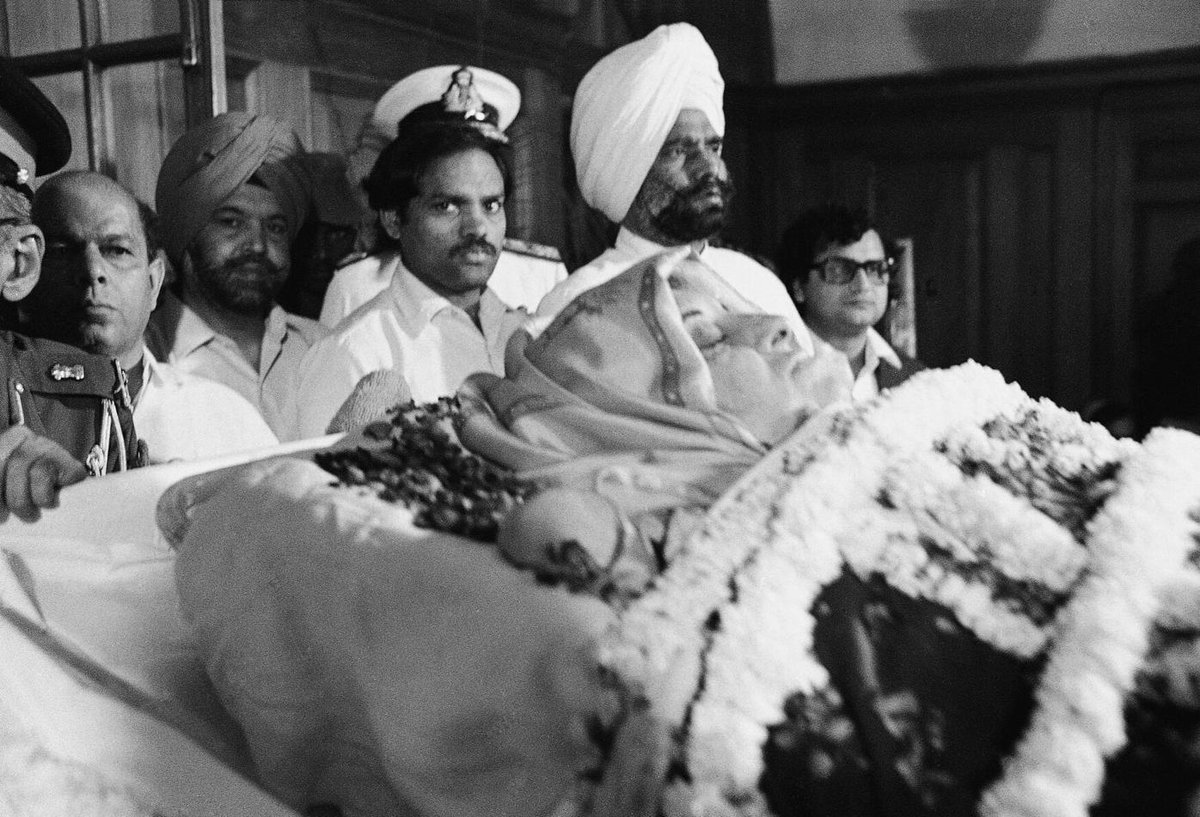
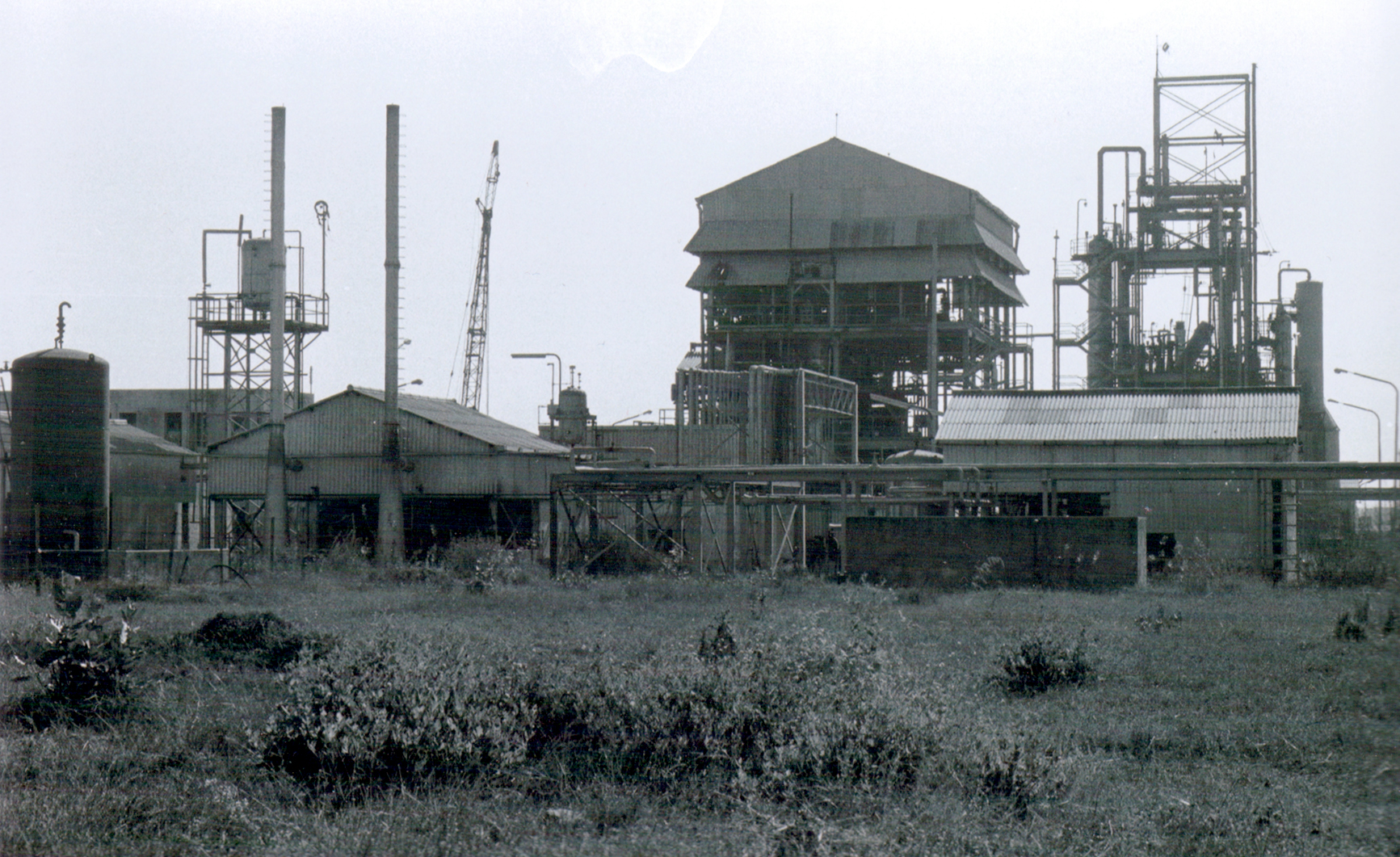
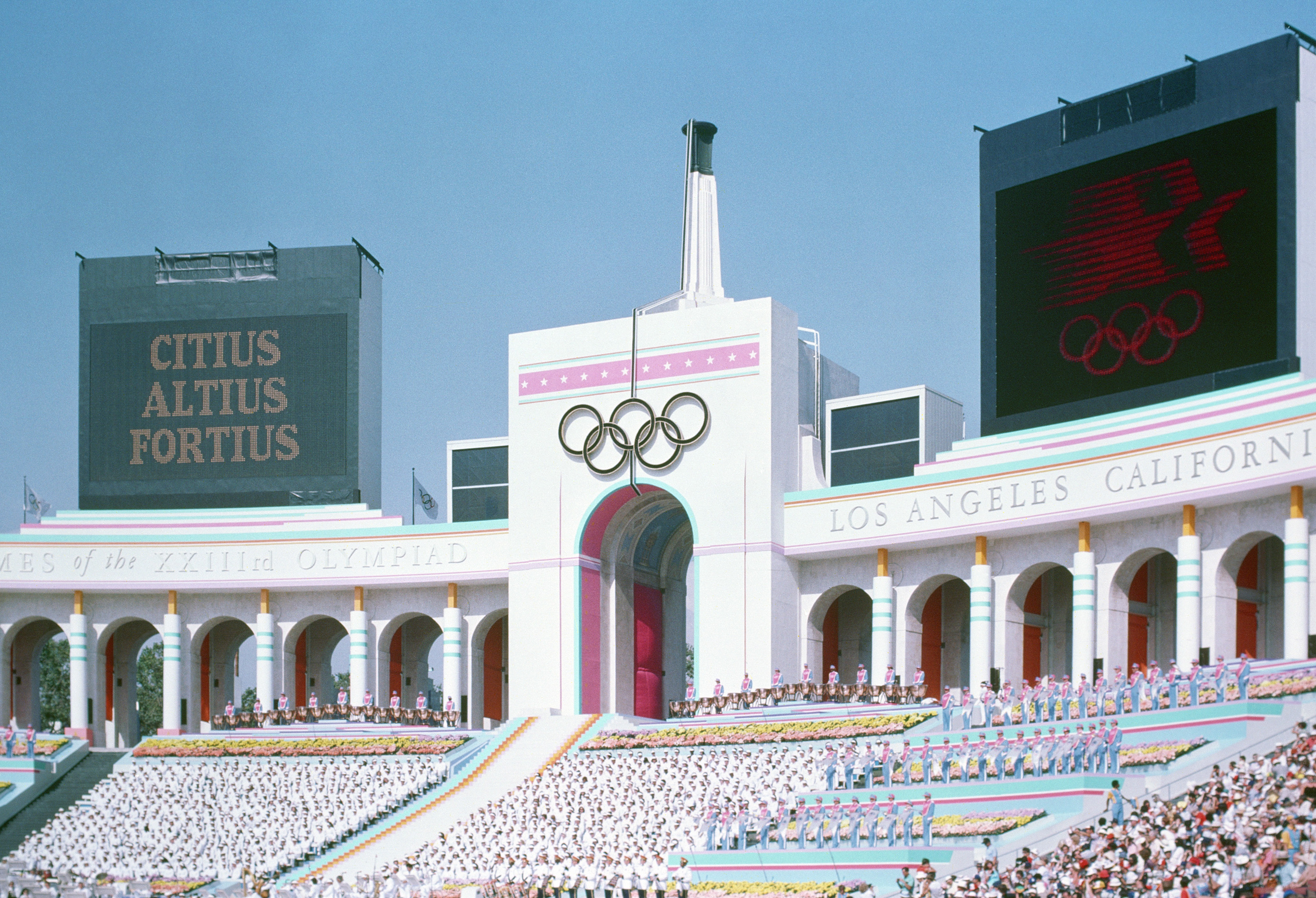
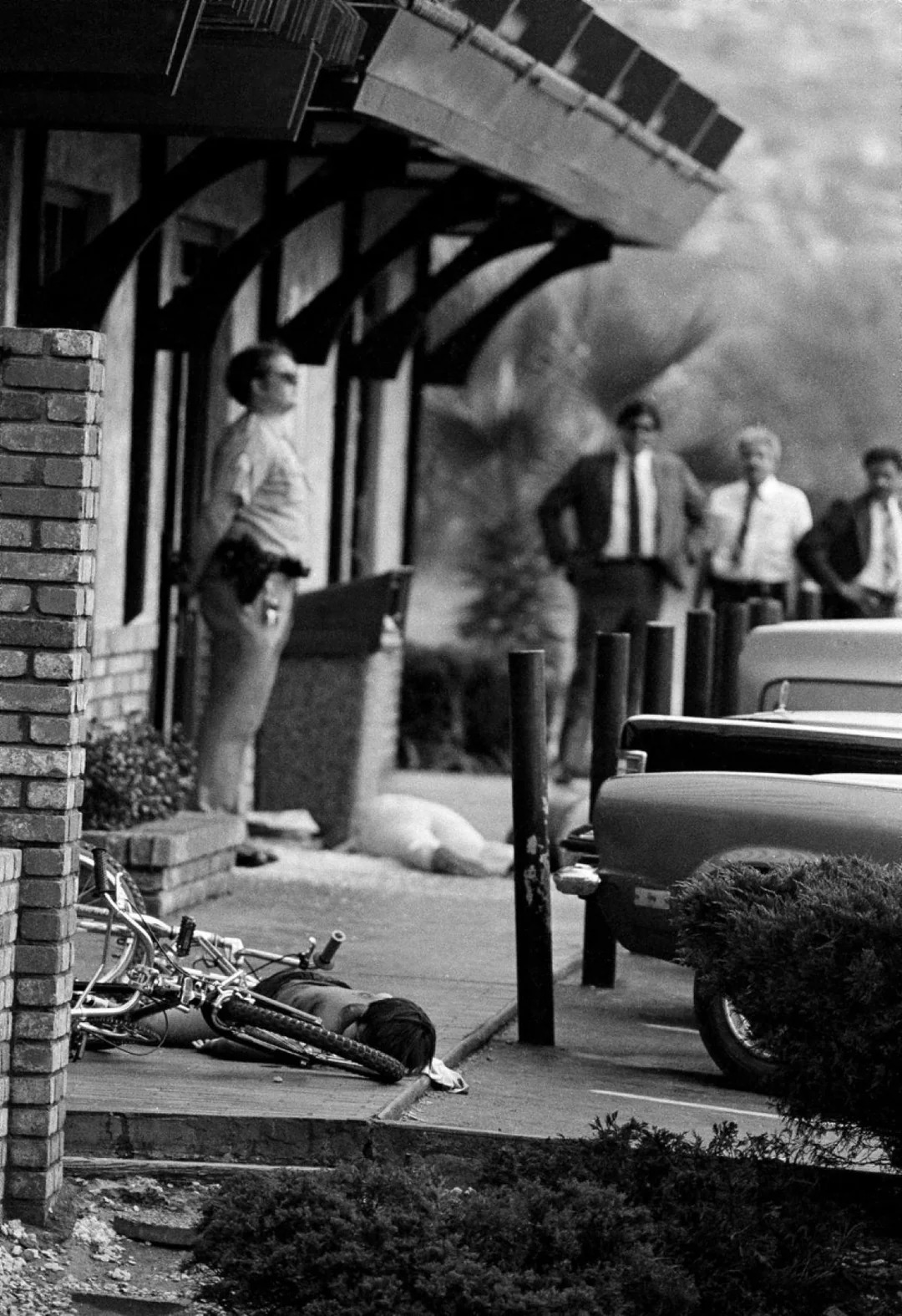
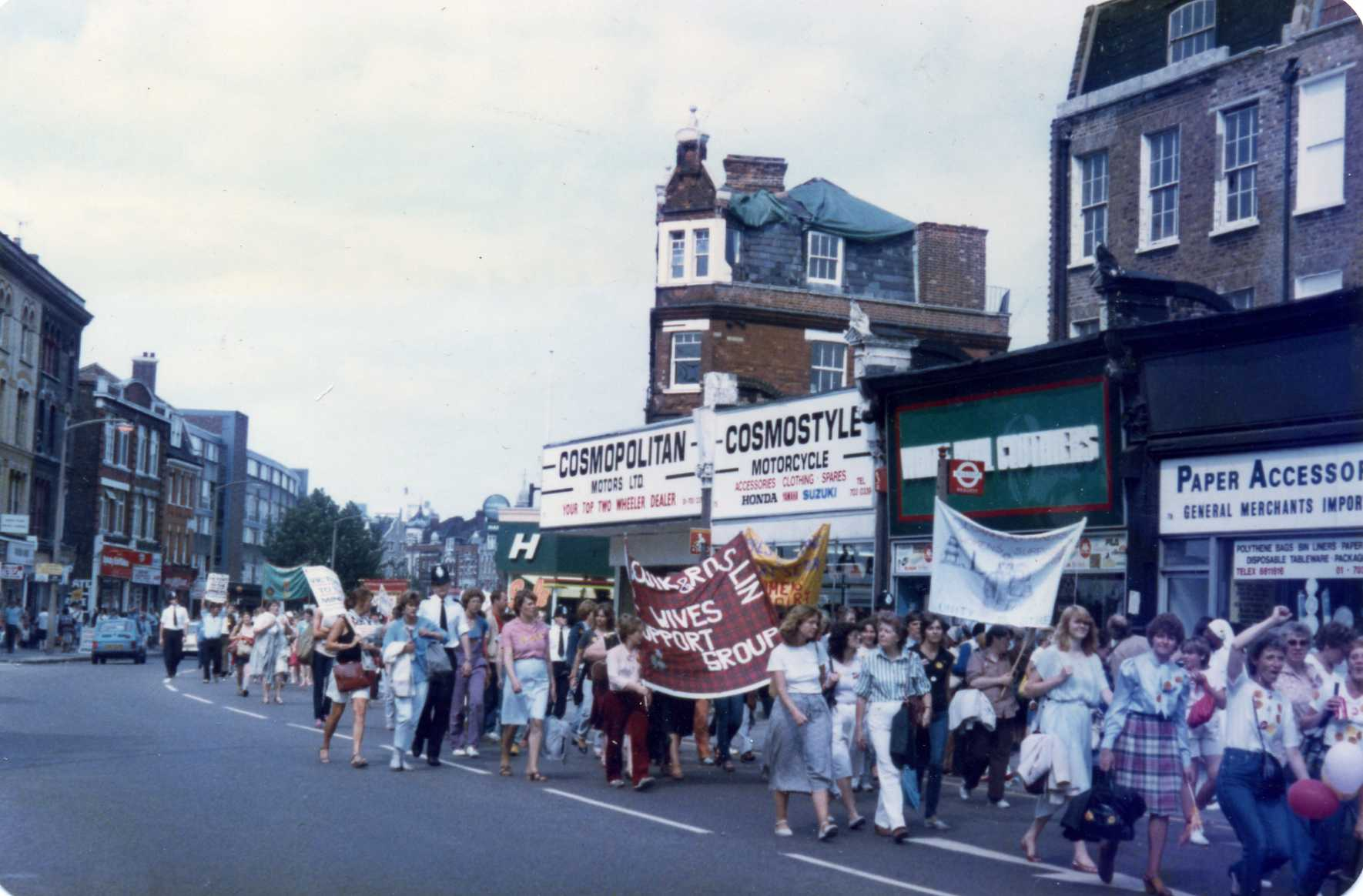
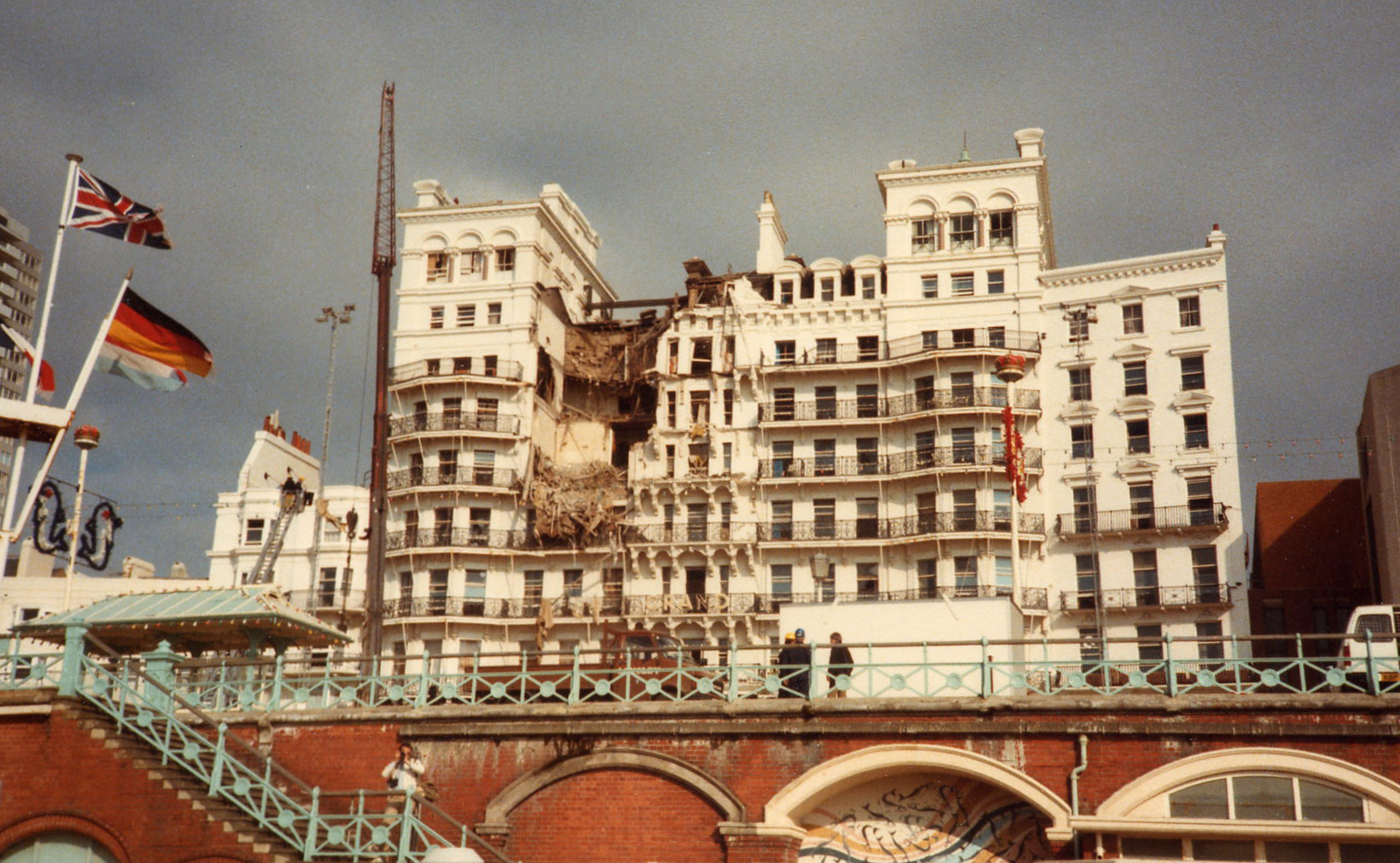
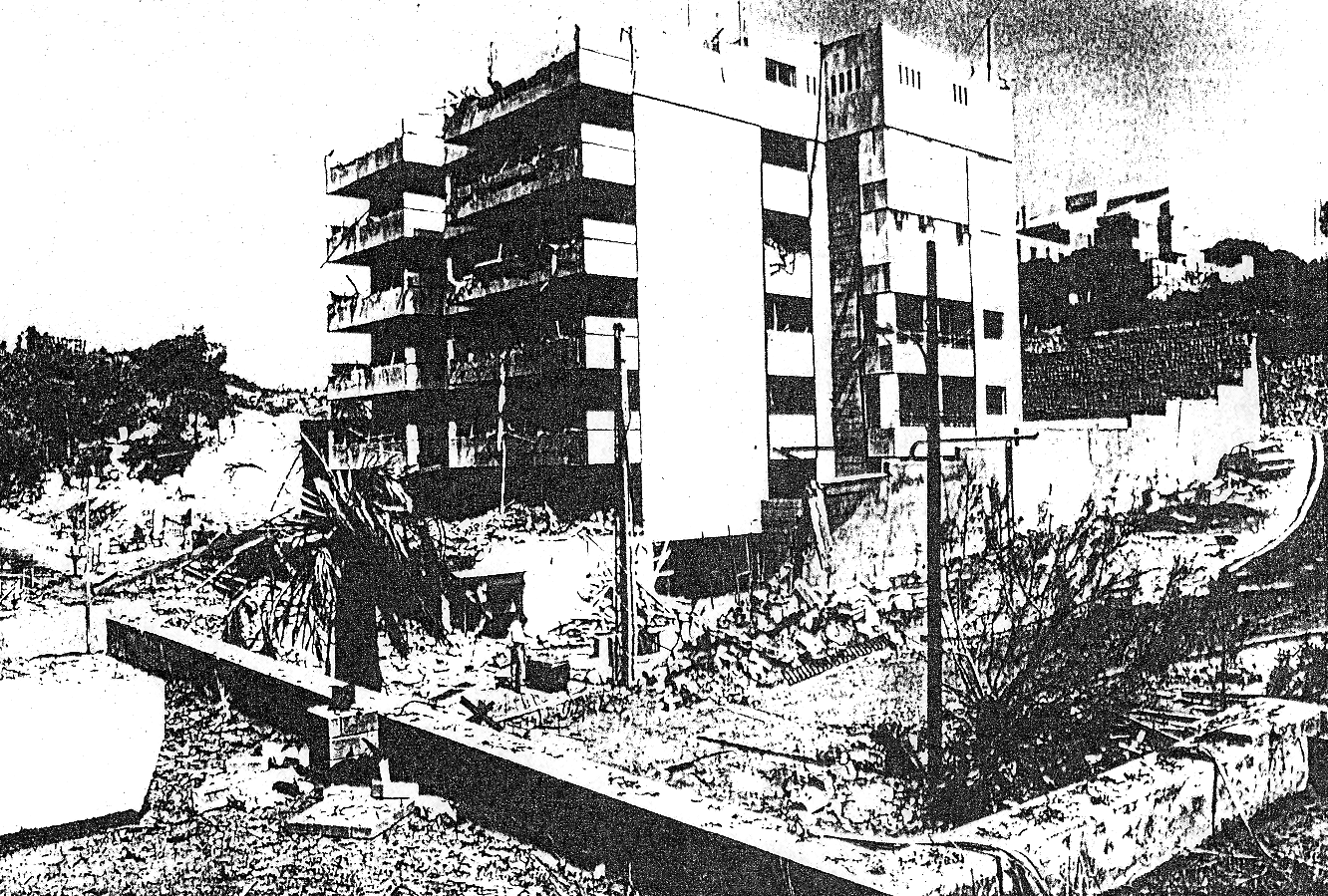
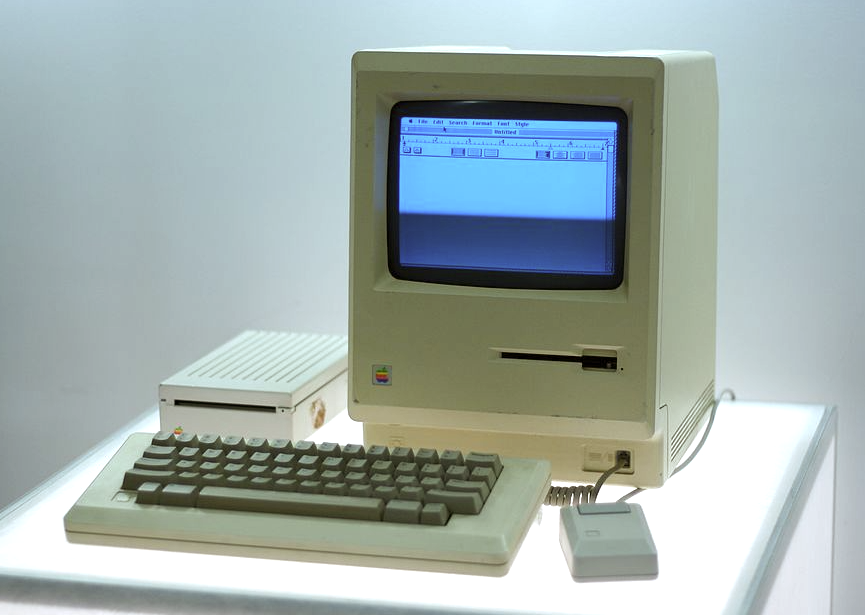
From top to bottom, left to right: Indira Gandhi is assassinated in New Delhi, sparking the 1984 anti-Sikh riots; the Bhopal disaster kills thousands after a toxic gas leak in Bhopal; the 1984 Summer Olympics are held in Los Angeles; the San Ysidro McDonald's massacre takes place in San Ysidro; the 1984–1985 United Kingdom miners' strike begins; the Brighton hotel bombing targets Margaret Thatcher during the Conservative Party conference; the 1984 US embassy bombing in Beirut kills over 60 people; and the Macintosh 128K is released.

1984 (MCMLXXXIV) was a leap year starting on Sunday of the Gregorian calendar, the 1984th year of the Common Era (CE) and Anno Domini (AD) designations, the 984th year of the 2nd millennium, the 84th year of the 20th century, and the 5th year of the 1980s decade.

== Events ==
=== January ===
- January 1 – The Bornean Sultanate of Brunei gains full independence from the United Kingdom, having become a British protectorate in 1888.
- January 7 – Brunei becomes the sixth member of the Association of Southeast Asian Nations (ASEAN).
- January 9 – Van Halen releases their sixth studio album 1984 (MCMLXXXIV), which debuts at number 2 on the Billboard 200 albums chart, and will go to sell over 10 million copies in the United States.
- January 10
  - The United States and the Vatican (Holy See) restore full diplomatic relations.
  - The Victoria Agreement is signed, institutionalising the Indian Ocean Commission.
- January 24 – Steve Jobs launches the Macintosh personal computer in the United States.

=== February ===
- February 3
  - John Buster and the research team at Harbor–UCLA Medical Center announce history's first embryo transfer from one woman to another, resulting in a live birth.
  - STS-41-B: Space Shuttle Challenger is launched on the 10th Space Shuttle mission.
- February 7 – Astronauts Bruce McCandless II and Robert L. Stewart make the first untethered space walk.
- February 8–19 – The 1984 Winter Olympics are held in Sarajevo, Yugoslavia.
- February 13 – Konstantin Chernenko succeeds the late Yuri Andropov as General Secretary of the Communist Party of the Soviet Union.
- February 22 – President of Bangladesh, H M Ershad upgrades South Sylhet's sub-division status to a district and renames it back to Moulvibazar.
- February 23 – TED (conference) is founded.
- February 29 – Canadian prime minister Pierre Trudeau announces his retirement.

=== March ===
- March 5 – Iran accuses Iraq of using chemical weapons; the United Nations condemns their use on March 30.
- March 12 – The National Union of Mineworkers strikes as tens of thousands of miners in the United Kingdom stop working in protest over colliery closures, starting the United Kingdom miners' strike that lasts a year.
- March 16
  - The United States Central Intelligence Agency station chief in Beirut, William Francis Buckley, is kidnapped by the Islamic Jihad Organization and later dies in captivity.
  - Gary Plauché shoots his son's rapist at Baton Rouge Metropolitan Airport
- March 23 – General Rahimuddin Khan becomes the first man in Pakistan's history to rule over two of its provinces, after becoming interim Governor of Sindh.

=== April ===
- April 2 – Indian Squadron Leader Rakesh Sharma is launched into space, aboard the Soyuz T-11.
- April 12 – Palestinian gunmen take Israeli bus number 300 hostage. Israeli special forces storm the bus, freeing the hostages (one hostage, two hijackers killed).
- April 13 – India launches Operation Meghdoot, bringing most of the disputed Siachen Glacier region of Kashmir under Indian control and triggering the Siachen conflict with Pakistan.
- April 15
  - The first World Youth Day gathering is held in Rome, Italy.
  - Pittsburgh Light Rail opens to the public.
  - British comedian, performer and magician Tommy Cooper suffers a heart attack during a live TV performance at His Majesty's Theatre, London and dies aged 63.

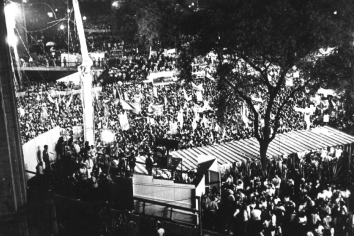
Diretas Já demonstration held in São Paulo

- April 16 – More than one million people, led by Tancredo Neves, occupy the streets of São Paulo to demand direct presidential elections during the Brazilian military government of João Figueiredo. It is the largest protest during the Diretas Já civil unrest, as well as the largest public demonstration in the history of Brazil. The elections are granted in 1989.
- April 17 – Metropolitan Police officer Yvonne Fletcher was fatally shot, during a demonstration outside the Libyan embassy in London, leading to an eleven-day siege of the embassy, and the severing of diplomatic relations between the United Kingdom and Libya.
- April 19 – Advance Australia Fair is proclaimed as Australia's national anthem, and green and gold as the national colours.
- April 24 – An X-class solar flare erupts on the Sun.
- April 26 – Sultan Iskandar of Johor becomes Yang di-Pertuan Agong of Malaysia, in succession to Sultan Ahmad Shah, whose term ended the previous day.

=== May ===
- May 2 – South Africa, Mozambique and Portugal sign an agreement on electricity supply from the Cahora Bassa dam.
- May 5
  - The Herreys' song "Diggi-Loo Diggi-Ley" wins the Eurovision Song Contest for Sweden in Luxembourg. It subsequently becomes a top-ten hit in five European countries.
  - The Itaipu Dam, on the border of Brazil and Paraguay after nine years of construction, begins generating power; it is the largest hydroelectric dam in the world at the time.
- May 8 – The Soviet Union announces that it will boycott the 1984 Summer Olympics in Los Angeles.
- May 11 – A transit of Earth from Mars takes place.
- May 12 – The Louisiana World Exposition, also known as the 1984 World's Fair, opens.
- May 13 – Severomorsk Disaster: an explosion at the Soviets' Severomorsk Naval Base destroys two-thirds of all the missiles stockpiled for the Soviets' Northern Fleet. The blast also destroys workshops needed to maintain the missiles as well as hundreds of technicians. Western military experts called it the worst naval disaster the Soviet Navy has suffered since WWII.
- May 14 – The one-dollar coin is introduced in Australia.
- May 23 – A methane gas explosion at Abbeystead water treatment works in Lancashire, UK, kills 16 people.
- May 30 – Liverpool beat Roma 5–2 after penalties in the final of the 1984 European Cup football tournament.

=== June ===
- June 5 – The Indian government begins Operation Blue Star, the planned attack on the Golden Temple in Amritsar.
- June 8 – An F5 tornado nearly destroys the town of Barneveld, Wisconsin, killing nine people, injuring nearly 200, and causing over $25,000,000 in damage.
- June 10 – A Soviet soldier defects to West Germany across the inner German border, the first such defection since 1976.
- June 14–16 – voting days for the European Parliament election
- June 16 – The Canadian entertainment company Cirque du Soleil is founded.
- June 19 – 17-year-old Ricky Kasso murders Gary Lauwers in Northport, New York, contributing to the Satanic panic association of heavy metal music and satanism.
- June 22 – Virgin Atlantic makes its inaugural flight.
- June 25 – Hayim Association is founded by Rina Zaizov Marx and parents of children with cancer as paediatric oncology department in Israel.
- June 27 – France beats Spain 2–0 to win Euro 84.
- June 30 – John Turner becomes the 17th Prime Minister of Canada.

=== July ===
- July 1
  - Liechtenstein becomes the last country in Europe to grant women the right to vote.
  - Argentinian footballer Diego Maradona is sold by FC Barcelona (Spain) to S.S.C. Napoli (Italy) for a world record fee at this date of $10.48M (£6.9M).
- July 14 – New Zealand Prime Minister Rob Muldoon calls a snap election and is defeated by opposition Labour leader David Lange.

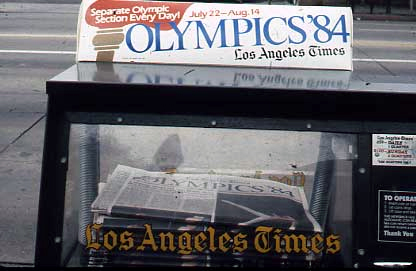
Newspaper vending machine featuring news of the 1984 Summer Olympics, which opened on July 28

- July 18 – San Ysidro McDonald's massacre: 41-year-old James Huberty walks into a McDonald's in the San Ysidro district of San Diego, resulting in 21 deaths, with Huberty being killed by a sniper 77 minutes after the ordeal begins.
- July 25 – Salyut 7: cosmonaut Svetlana Savitskaya becomes the first woman to perform a space walk.
- July 28–August 12 – The 1984 Summer Olympics are held in Los Angeles, California.

=== August ===
- August 1 – Australian banks are deregulated.
- August 4
  - The African republic Upper Volta changes its name to Burkina Faso.
  - Soviet submarine K-278 Komsomolets reaches a record submergence depth of 1,020 meters.
- August 11 – Barefoot South African runner Zola Budd and Mary Decker of the U.S. collide in the Olympic 3000 meters final, neither finishing as medallists.
- August 16 – John DeLorean is acquitted of all eight charges of possessing and distributing cocaine.
- August 21 – Half a million people in Manila demonstrate against the regime of Ferdinand Marcos.

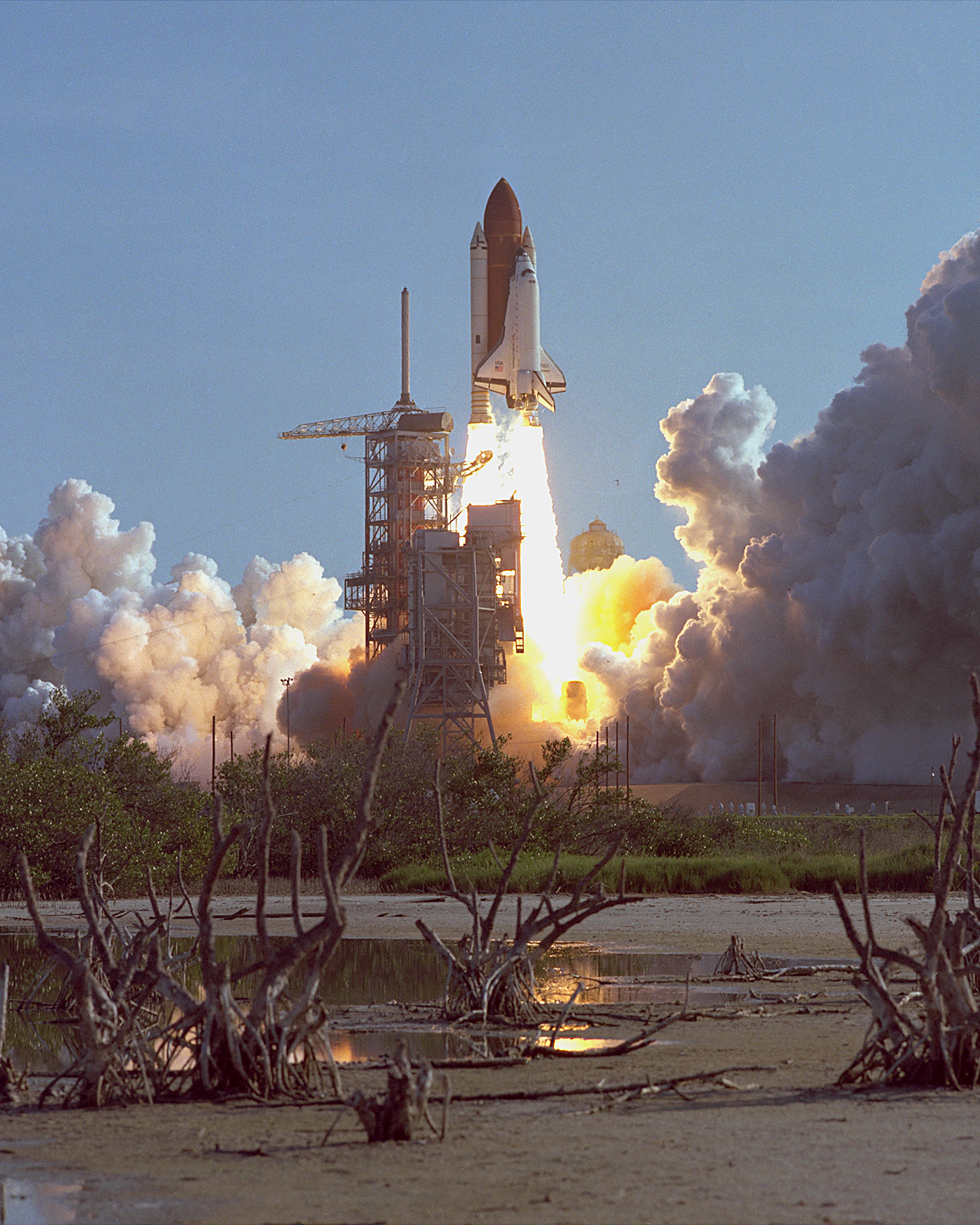
The launch of shuttle Discovery on STS-41-D, its first mission

- August 30 – STS-41-D: the Space Shuttle Discovery takes off on its maiden voyage.

=== September ===
- September 2 – Seven people are shot and killed and 12 wounded in the Milperra massacre, a shootout between the rival motorcycle gangs Bandidos and Comancheros in Sydney, Australia.
- September 4 – The Progressive Conservative Party of Canada, led by Brian Mulroney, wins 211 seats in the House of Commons of Canada, forming the largest majority government in Canadian history.
- September 5
  - STS-41-D: the Space Shuttle Discovery lands after its maiden voyage at Edwards Air Force Base in California.
  - Western Australia becomes the last Australian state to abolish capital punishment.
- September 7 – An explosion on board a Maltese patrol boat disposing illegal fireworks at sea off Gozo kills seven soldiers and policemen.
- September 14
  - P. W. Botha is inaugurated as the first executive State President of South Africa.
  - Joe Kittinger begins his attempt to become the first person to fly a gas balloon solo across the Atlantic Ocean.
- September 16 – Edgar Reitz's film series Heimat begins release in Germany.
- September 17 – Brian Mulroney is sworn in as Prime Minister of Canada.
- September 18 – Joe Kittinger becomes the first person to cross the Atlantic, solo, in a hot air balloon.
- September 20 – Hezbollah car-bombs the U.S. Embassy annex in Beirut, killing 24 people.
- September 26 – The United Kingdom and the People's Republic of China sign the initial agreement to return Hong Kong to China in 1997.
- September 29 – In the early morning, police in Sicily apprehend 366 people they suspect to be involved in the activities of Cosa Nostra.

=== October ===
- October 2 - John Schnatter founded Papa John's in Jeffersontown, Kentucky.
- October 4 – Tim Macartney-Snape and Greg Mortimer become the first Australians to reach the summit of Mount Everest.
- October 5 – STS-41-G: Marc Garneau becomes the first Canadian in space, aboard the Space Shuttle Challenger.
- October 9 – Thomas the Tank Engine & Friends by Britt Allcroft broadcasts its first two episodes in the United Kingdom.
- October 11
  - Aboard the Space Shuttle Challenger, astronaut Kathryn D. Sullivan becomes the first American woman to perform a space walk.
  - Aeroflot Flight 3352 crashes at Omsk Airport into maintenance vehicles on the runway, killing 174 people on board and 4 on the ground.
- October 12 – The Provisional Irish Republican Army (PIRA) attempts to assassinate Prime Minister Margaret Thatcher and the British Cabinet in the Brighton hotel bombing with an explosive device planted nearly a month earlier in their conference hotel. The terror attack kills five people and injures 31.
- October 14 – The Detroit Tigers defeat the San Diego Padres in game five of the 1984 World Series to win the franchise's 4th championship.
- October 19
  - Polish secret police kidnapped and assassinated Father Jerzy Popiełuszko, a Catholic priest who supported the Solidarity movement. His body was found in a reservoir 11 days later on October 30.
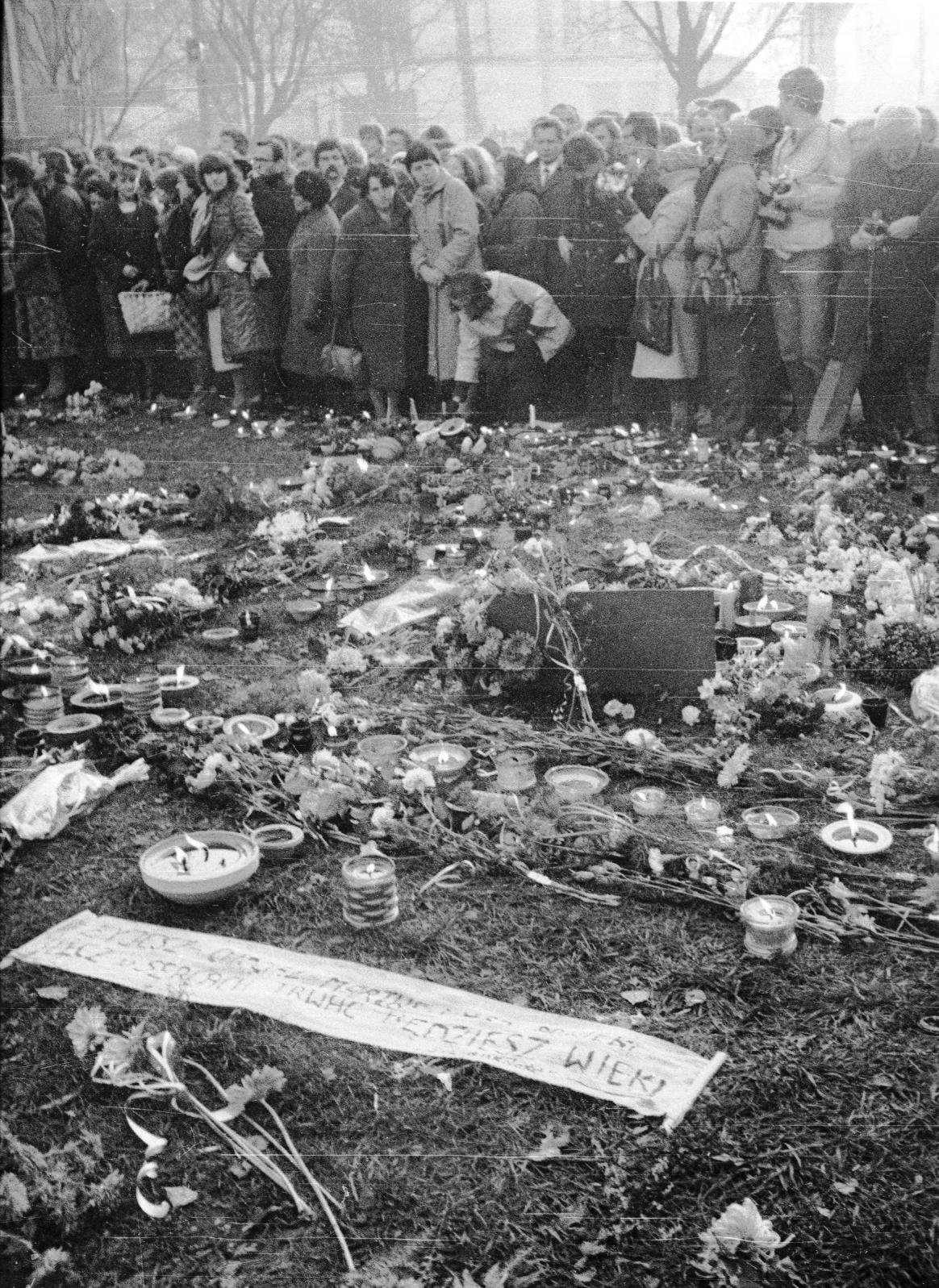
    People gathering at the funeral of Father Jerzy Popiełuszko on 3 November 1984, 15 days after his assassination.
  - Wapiti Aviation Flight 402 crashes into terrain 40 km (25 mi) southeast of High Prairie, Alberta, Canada. Six are killed including leader of the Alberta NDP, Grant Notley, while the four survivors are later rescued the next day.
- October 20 – Monterey Bay Aquarium is opened to the public after seven years of development and construction.
- October 23 – The world learns from moving BBC News television reports presented by Michael Buerk of the famine in Ethiopia, where thousands of people have already died of starvation due to a famine, and as many as 10,000,000 more lives are at risk.
- October 25 – The European Economic Community makes £1.8 million available to help combat the famine in Ethiopia.
- October 26 – The science fiction action film The Terminator premieres. It is the third film directed by James Cameron, and stars Arnold Schwarzenegger, Linda Hamilton, and Michael Biehn.
- October 31 – Assassination of Indira Gandhi: Prime Minister of India Indira Gandhi is assassinated by her two Sikh security guards in New Delhi. Anti-Sikh riots break out, leaving 10,000 to 20,000 Sikhs dead in Delhi and surrounding areas with the majority populations of Hindus. Rajiv Gandhi becomes Prime Minister of India.

=== November ===
- November 1–4 – Anti-Sikh mass murder takes place in Delhi and various parts of India following the assassination of Prime Minister Indira Gandhi.
- November 3 – 600,000 to 1 million people were attending the funeral of Father Jerzy at St. Stanislaus Kostka Church in Żoliborz following his assassination.
- November 4 – The Sandinista Front wins the Nicaraguan general elections.
- November 6 – 1984 United States presidential election: Republican President Ronald Reagan defeats Democratic former Vice President Walter F. Mondale with 59% of the popular vote, the highest since Richard Nixon's 61% popular vote victory in 1972. Reagan carries 49 states in the electoral College; Mondale wins only his home state of Minnesota (by a mere 3,761 vote margin) and the District of Columbia.

Presidential election results map. Red denotes states won by Reagan/Bush (49), and Blue denotes those won by Mondale/Ferraro (1+D.C.).

- November 9–11 – The first Hackers Conference is held.
- November 11 – The Louisiana World Exposition, also known as The 1984 World's Fair, and also the New Orleans World's Fair, and, to the locals, simply as "The Fair" or "Expo 84", closes.
- November 12 – Western Sahara conflict: Morocco leaves the Organization of African Unity in protest at the admission of Western Sahara as a member.
- November 14 – Zamboanga City mayor Cesar Climaco, a prominent critic of the government of Philippine President Ferdinand Marcos, is assassinated in his home city.
- November 19 – A series of explosions at the Pemex Petroleum Storage Facility at San Juan Ixhuatepec, in Mexico City, ignites a major fire and kills about 500 people.
- November 21 – Start of Operation Moses, the evacuation of refugee Beta Israel Ethiopian Jews from Sudan to Israel via Brussels.
- November 25
  - Band Aid (assembled by Bob Geldof) records the charity single "Do They Know It's Christmas?" in London to raise money to combat the famine in Ethiopia. It is released on December 3.
  - 1984 Uruguayan presidential election: Julio María Sanguinetti is democratically elected President of Uruguay after 12 years of military dictatorship.
- November 28 – Over 250 years after their deaths, William Penn and his wife Hannah Callowhill Penn are made Honorary Citizens of the United States.
- November 30 – Sri Lankan Civil War, Kent and Dollar Farm massacres: the Liberation Tigers of Tamil Eelam begin their first massacres of the Sinhalese people, in North and East Sri Lanka. 127 are killed.

=== December ===
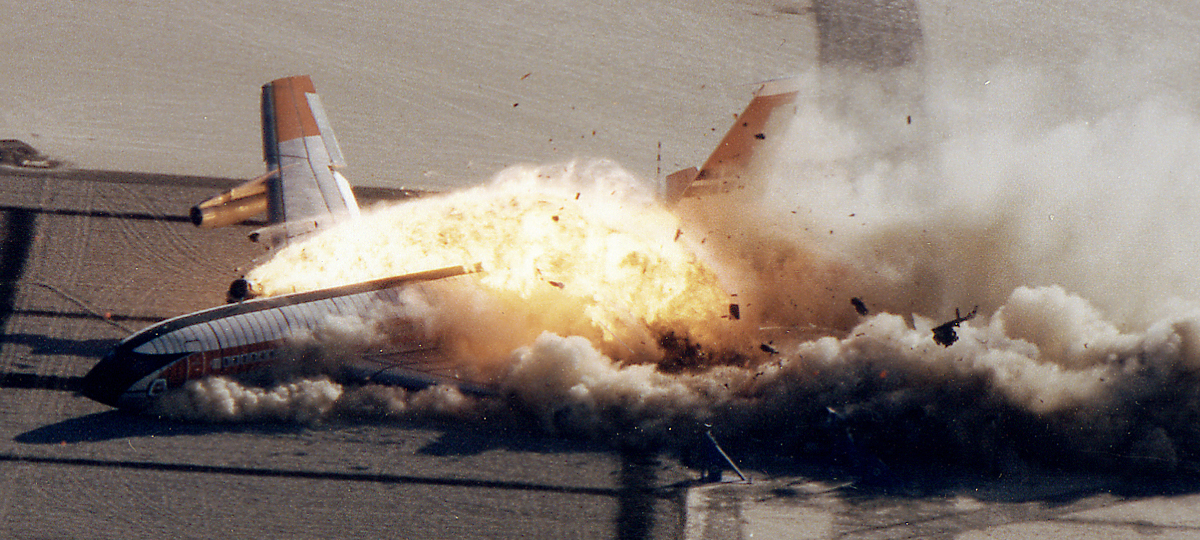
Controlled Impact Demonstration

- December 1
  - A peace agreement between Kenya and Somalia is signed in the Egyptian capital Cairo. With this agreement, in which Somalia officially renounces its historical territorial claims, relations between the two countries begin to improve.
  - The Light Rail Transit in Manila begins service with the opening of its southern segment, as the first rapid transit service in Southeast Asia.
- December 2 – 1984 Australian federal election: Bob Hawke's Labor government is re-elected with a reduced majority, defeating the Liberal/National Coalition led by Andrew Peacock.
- December 3 – Bhopal disaster: A methyl isocyanate leak from a Union Carbide pesticide plant in Bhopal, Madhya Pradesh, India, kills more than 8,000 people outright and injures over half a million (with more later dying from their injuries the death toll reaches 23,000+) in the worst industrial disaster in history.
- December 4
  - Sri Lankan Civil War, 1984 Mannar massacre: Sri Lankan Army soldiers kill over 200 civilians in the town of Mannar.
  - Hezbollah militants hijack a Kuwait Airlines plane and kill 4 passengers.
- December 19 – The People's Republic of China and the United Kingdom sign the Sino-British Joint Declaration on the future of Hong Kong.
- December 20 – Disappearance of Jonelle Matthews from Greeley, Colorado. Her remains were discovered on 23 July 2019, located about 15 mi (24 km) southeast of Jonelle's home. The cause of death "was a gunshot wound to the head".
- December 22
  - Four African-American youths (Barry Allen, Troy Canty, James Ramseur, and Darrell Cabey) board an express train in the Bronx borough of New York City. They demand five dollars from Bernhard Goetz, who shoots them. The event starts a national debate about urban crime in the United States.
  - In Malta, Prime Minister Dom Mintoff resigns.
- December 28 – A Soviet cruise missile plunges into Lake Inari in Finnish Lapland, known as the Lake Inari missile incident. Finnish authorities announce the fact in public on January 3, 1985.

=== Date unknown ===
- 1983–85 famine in Ethiopia intensifies with renewed drought by mid-year, killing a million people by the end of this year.
- Crack cocaine, a smokeable form of the drug, is first introduced into Los Angeles and soon spreads across the United States in what becomes known as the crack epidemic.
- The Chrysler Corporation introduces the first vehicles to be officially labeled as "minivans". They are branded as the Chrysler Town & Country, Dodge Caravan, and Plymouth Voyager.

== Nobel Prizes ==

- Physics – Carlo Rubbia, Simon van der Meer
- Chemistry – Robert Bruce Merrifield
- Medicine – Niels Kaj Jerne, Georges J. F. Köhler, César Milstein
- Literature – Jaroslav Seifert
- Peace – Bishop Desmond Mpilo Tutu
- Bank of Sweden Prize in Economic Sciences in Memory of Alfred Nobel – Richard Stone
