= Avigdor Yitzhaki =

Israeli politician (1949–2025)

- אביגדור יצחקי
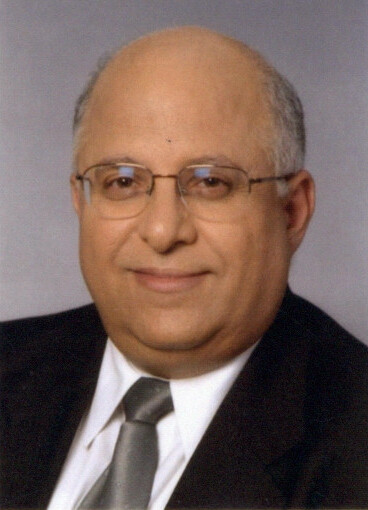

Faction represented in the Knesset
- 2006–2008: Kadima

Personal details
- Born: 13 September 1949; Tel Aviv, Israel
- Died: 5 April 2025 (aged 75); Tel Aviv, Israel

Avigdor Yitzhaki (Hebrew: אביגדור יצחקי; 13 September 1949 – 5 April 2025) was an Israeli politician. He was a member of the Knesset for Kadima, having been the party's parliamentary group chairman and head of the coalition. He was the chairman of Friends of Schneider.

On 2 May 2007, Yitzhaki requested that Prime Minister of Israel Ehud Olmert resign as soon as possible following the Winograd Commission's first report. On 7 February 2008 he resigned from the Knesset due to "serious doubts over Ehud Olmert's ability to lead the government in the wake of the Winograd Report".

Yitzhaki died in Tel Aviv on 5 April 2025, at the age of 75.
