= Hayim Association =

Israeli nonprofit organization

- Hayim Association for Children with Cancer in Israel
- עמותת חיים
- The Hayim Association logo was designed by Dan Reisinger in 1986. (The letters 'י' were replaced by green leaves, a symbol of life).
- Founded: 25 June 1984 (42 years ago)
- Founder: Prof. Rina Zaizov Marx and parents whose children have with cancer
- Type: NGO
- Registration no.: 580073955
- Purpose: Saving lives of children with cancer
- Location: Derech Ze'ev Jabotinsky 138, Ramat-Gan 5260208, Israel 32.090614°N 34.822272°E
- Region served: Israel
- Volunteers: 300
- Website: hayim.org

The HAYIM Association for Children with Cancer in Israel (Hebrew: עמותת חיים) is a non-governmental organization that works on a voluntary basis to provide relief and support for pediatric oncology patients in Israel.

== Etymology ==
"Hayim" (also transcribed as Haim, Chayyim, Haym, Chaim Hebrew: חַיִּים /ˌxɑːiːm/) is a Hebrew word meaning "life" is dedicated to improving and saving the lives of children with cancer.

== History ==
The Hayim Association was established in Israel in 1984 (42 years ago). This non-profit charitable organisation established by parents of children with cancer to advocate for their children's needs, and to support research. The Hayim Association was the first organization in Israel that aims to provide help for children with cancer. Since it was founded, the Hayim Association has worked unremittingly to advance treatment and improve the quality of life of those children.

The association, the brainchild of the late Prof. Rina Zaizov Marx, recipient of the Israel Prize in Medicine, and co-founder of the association, is run by parents of children with cancer, some of whom have made a full recovery and some who died of the disease.

== Function ==
All of the work is carried out on a volunteer basis, taking up vast amounts of time and personal resources. The association initially worked on behalf of the Oncology Department at Schneider Children's Medical Center of Israel, but within a few years it branched out, until today it is operating nationwide, supporting all of the pediatric hemato-oncology wards across Israel.

The Hayim Association plays a critical role in increasing public awareness of cancer in children, helping to reduce the stigma attached to this disease in various sectors of the public. The various activities provided by the Hayim Association provide these sick children with moments of happiness and solace.

The main focus of the Hayim Association's activities centers on its promotion of pediatric cancer research and treatment in Israel. A large part of the medical progress in this field has occurred due to the use of the state of the art equipment acquired with the help of the association. The association supported the creation of the Israel Society of Pediatric Hematology Oncology's precise databases, which monitor the incidence of pediatric cancer in Israel, and facilitate participation in an advanced international treatment protocol that requires significant financial backing. The association has positioned permanent social services personnel in pediatric oncology departments across the country, who identify the needs in the field and provide an immediately solution on a daily basis.

The Hayim Association considers that an important part of its role is treating the entire family through family-oriented activities. It provides support groups for parents and siblings of children with cancer, while providing both material and emotional responses to their unique needs during diagnosis, as well as during and after treatment (including material support to families in need, financing special activity days, etc.) Through its endeavors, the association has facilitated the establishment of the first in-patient department in Israel for children with cancer, as well as the first bone marrow transplant unit in the country for these children.

The Hayim Association is involved in the ongoing struggle against cancer and in the raising of funds to help the children. The organization is administered by a voluntary steering committee. All members of the association work on a totally voluntary basis, without pay. Aid is given to all children without any distinction of race, creed, nationality, or political conviction.

The association is a member of the International Confederation of Childhood Cancer Parent Organization (ICCCPO). As the sole representative of the ICCCPO in Israel, it maintains close relations with the international organization and benefits from its experience and knowledge, applying the information to promote the quality of life of sick children in Israel and to standardize the treatment facilities in the various centers in the country.

All the association’s financial sources come from donations from within Israel and from Jewish communities worldwide.

== Current operations ==
=== Assistance to Families ===
The moment a child is diagnosed with cancer, the family balance changes dramatically. As well as the crisis caused by the diagnosis itself, one of the parents is often forced to leave their job in order to dedicate themselves to providing close supervision and care for their child during treatments. The second parent often continues to work, while also remaining committed to caring for the other siblings at home, ensuring that their daily routine is maintained as far as possible. This situation (diminishing incomes vs. increasing expenses) causes families serious financial and emotional distress. Many families experience severe financial crises following diagnosis of their child's illness, due to the heavy expenses involved in treating their sick child. The Hayim Association provides financial assistance to families, so that parents can continue with their daily routine while providing for their daily needs as well as the special needs involved in paying for their sick child's treatment. The following services are offered:

- Direct financial assistance to the family
- Assistance in funding vital auxiliary equipment
- Assistance in purchasing medication not included in the Israeli National Health Basket of drugs, which is considered life-saving
- Specific assistance for essential medical needs, which will help increase the child's chances of recovery (purchase of a special bed, wheelchair, oxygen balloon, hearing aid, special spectacles, etc.)

=== Holiday Meals ===
On Passover eve and the Jewish New Year, the Hayim Association provides holiday meals in the pediatric oncology departments across Israel. Within the framework of the project, sick children who are forced to remain in hospital during the holidays can invite their families to celebrate around a special festive table near the child's bed. This meal is organized and funded by the Hayim Association with the support of association volunteers. It includes a hot, festival meal with all of the festival symbols. This meal provides warmth and love, and sweetens the holiday atmosphere for the sick children and their families, as well as giving them strength, even if just a little. It also helps to unite the family, despite the tremendous crisis brought on by the illness that affects each and every family member. Within this project, the association also helps the families of sick children who are experiencing financial hardships. The families of those children whose health allows them to be released from the hospital for the festival eve are given holiday grants – financial assistance designed to help the family organize for the festival and purchase the products and festival symbols required for the holiday, just as in any home in Israel.

=== Transportation Services ===
The child patients must travel to and from the hospital to receive treatments. Many families encounter financial strain as a result of the child's illness and the heavy costs involved in their treatment. Many families with sick children don't have a private car, and the child's health does not allow them to travel by public transportation, due to their compromised immune system. The frequency of their hospital visits is high, placing an additional financial burden on the families. The Hayim Association has provided assistance in obtaining reimbursements and even fully funding transportation costs in cases where the family's Health Maintenance Organization does not participate. Included are tests, follow-up visits, and various emergencies that require the child to travel to the hospital.

=== Caregiver Services ===
The moment a child is diagnosed with cancer, the family dynamic changes dramatically. In addition to the tremendous crisis caused by diagnosis of the disease, many parents are forced to leave their jobs in order to dedicate themselves to their sick child and accompany their child during treatments. One parent often continues working, while also remaining committed to caring for the other siblings at home, trying to maintain their regular daily routine as far as possible. During the initial stage of active treatment, families experience emotional turmoil, due to the changes and upheavals in their lives. Then they must cope with chemotherapy, radiation therapy, transplants, surgery, and lengthy hospitalizations, and they require intensive care and close help. The Hayim Association provides sick children and their families with caregiver services. The services are designed to help the families which require additional assistance and support in the hospital and at home for the child and his/her siblings.

=== Summer Camp ===
The summer months are especially difficult for these children, as they are in hospital undergoing treatments while their healthy friends are enjoying summer camp and other fun activities. The sick children who are undergoing painful treatments are forced to avoid summer pleasures: travelling in public areas, due to their weakened immune system (as a result of the treatments), swimming, visiting beaches, and participating in summer camps that offer a wide range of activities. To help compensate them, the Hayim Association brings summer camp into the pediatric oncology departments, where children can enjoy a wide range of special activities that cater to their special needs and limitations, uplifting the children's spirits.

=== Dental Care ===
One of the most important problems in oncology treatment of children with cancer is dental and oral hygiene. The link between cancer and teeth can be seen in two specific ways:

1. The immune system of children who receive chemotherapy is severely weakened, which places them at a higher risk of contracting infections through dental care. The mouth constitutes a major source of infection in children who are receiving chemotherapy. Therefore, care of the teeth and gums is of primary importance to children who are undergoing treatment, in order to reduce the risk of infection.
2. The chemotherapy and radiation therapy alone is damaging to the teeth, gums and lining of the mouth. If maximum attention is not paid to this problem, the damage may be long term and further impair the child's health. This can also increase the chances of complications in the child's health, as a result of infections that reduce the quality of life of a child who has recovered from cancer.

Consequently, dental care forms an essential and vital component in the child's overall treatment. Pre-emptive dental care that is integrated with oncological treatments reduces the complications of treatment, while significantly contributing to reducing the suffering of these children and improving their future health.

The most common type of cancer in children is leukemia. When a child must undergo a bone marrow transplant, pre-emptive treatment is required, in order to minimize the risk of infection that might impairdamage transplant success. Dental care incurs serious expenses, whichthat force the family to pay in cash as a result of the financial situation that many families of cancer-stricken children experience, but they are unable to make these heavy payments. In certain cases, without financial assistance, hospitals are forced to postpone transplants due to insufficient preparation of the transplant child. Despite the critical importance of dental care in children with cancer, the issue does not receive a satisfactory response from Israel's healthcare system. Although the law requires the HMOs to fund some of these children's dental care, in reality, there are several reasons preventing the provision of dental care to children with cancer:

1. Dental care in children with cancer is difficult and complex, due to their compromised immune system and impaired blood-clotting abilities. Dental care must be provided by specialists in pediatric dentistry, and the number of these experts in the community is extremely low.
2. Due to bureaucratic failures, most children with cancer do not receive full insurance coverage for these treatments.
3. Due to the high cost of dental care, many families encounter difficulties in paying for even some of these costs.

=== Allocations to Institutes ===
The Hayim Association supports the oncology departments in hospitals across Israel, in order to promote the quality of medical services and care given to the sick children in these departments. The association funds medical personnel staffing positions: doctors, nurses, social workers, psychologists, lab technicians and paramedical staff, based on the needs of each department and on the financial ability of the association. The Hayim Association also supports the Israeli Society of Pediatric Hematology and Oncology vis-à-vis medical protocols in Israel and abroad in financing the funding of a data manager (to join the American Children's Oncology Group (COG), in financing ISPHO conferences, and professional psycho-social forums designed to compare and evaluate the treatment of children across Israel.

== Representatives ==
The association operates in all the medical centers nationwide, and is part of the oncology network in the departments. It is distinguished by its activity in identifying actual needs at the individual and collective level, and for matching projects that provide a satisfactory response to the needs of children and their supporting environment.

- Soroka Medical Center in Beersheba
- Rambam Health Care Campus in Haifa
- Bnai Zion Medical Center in Haifa
- HaEmek Medical Center in Afula
- Hadassah Medical Center in Jerusalem
- Shaare Zedek Medical Center in Jerusalem
- Sheba Medical Center in Tel HaShomer
- Dana-Dwek Children’s Hospital in Tel Aviv
- Schneider Children's Medical Center of Israel in Petah Tikva

== Awards and achievements ==
In recognition of its activities, the Hayim Association was awarded the 2002 Alon Prize for its “Outstanding Pioneering Act” and for its contribution to society in Israel. The association has been awarded the Quality Stamp of the Association and Non-Profit Organization sector and a certificate of Proper Management from the Registrar of Amutot (Non-Profit) Societies. The Hayim Association is recognized for tax purposes, Israeli registered Non-Profit Society No. 580073955. Hayim Association is a tax-exempt nonprofit organization.

== See also ==
- Jeremy's Circle
