= Dan Reisinger =

Israeli artist and graphic designer (1934–2019)

- דן ריזינגר
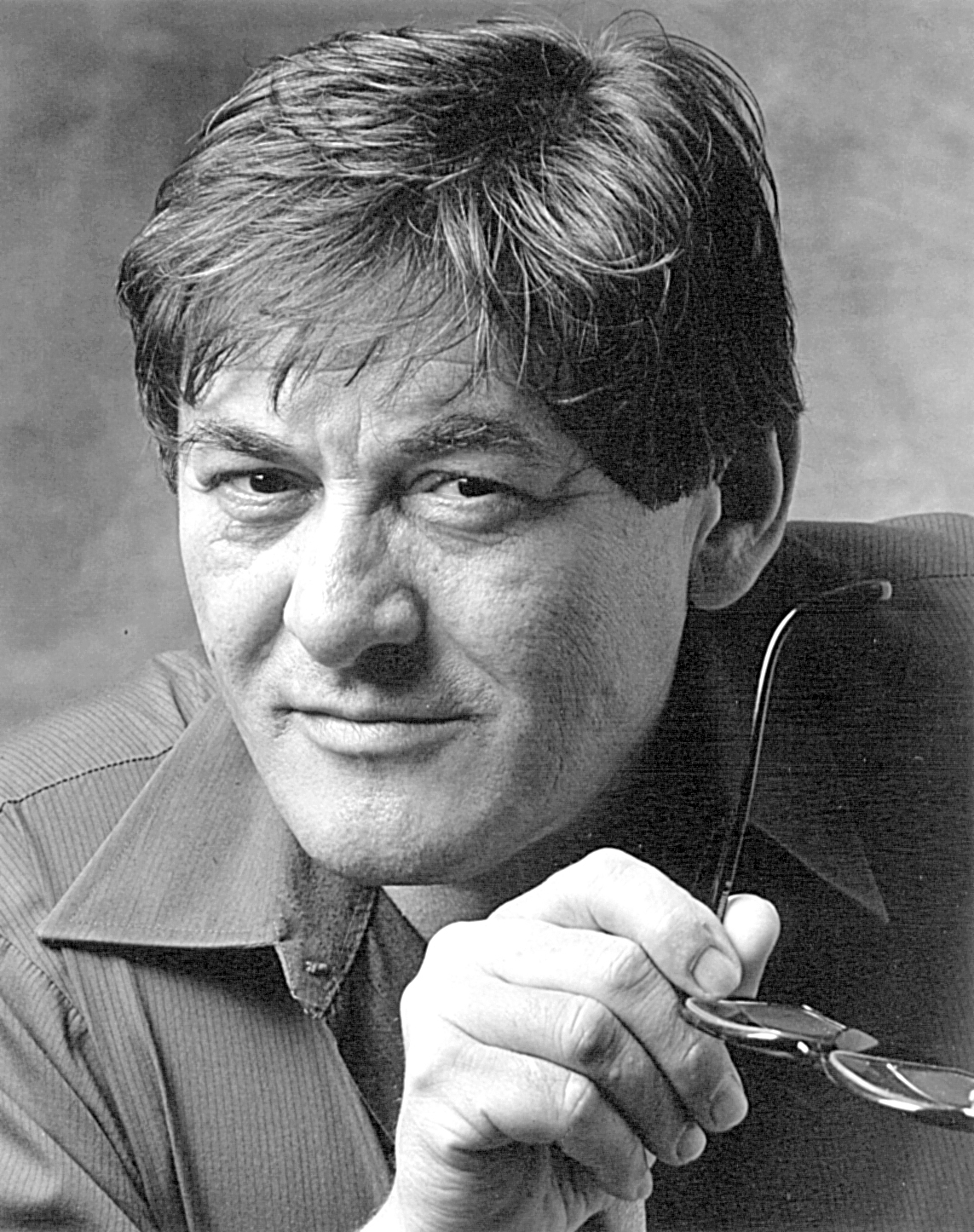
- Born: August 3, 1934; Kanjiža, Kingdom of Yugoslavia
- Died: November 26, 2019 (aged 85); Givatayim, Israel
- Occupations: Painter, graphic designer, artist
- Years active: 1966–2019
- Children: 3

Dan Reisinger (Hebrew: דן ריזינגר; August 3, 1934 – November 26, 2019) was an Israeli graphic designer and artist.

== Biography ==
Reisinger was born in Kanjiža, Serbia, into a family of painters and decorators active in Austria-Hungary and the Balkans. Most of his family members were murdered in the Holocaust, including his father. As a teenager, he became active in the Partisan Pioneer Brigade and, with his mother and stepfather, immigrated to Israel in 1949. Reisinger initially lived in a transit camp and then worked as a house painter in order to earn money from almost any source. In 1950 at age 16, he was accepted as a student—its youngest up to the time—at the Bezalel Academy of Art and Design in Jerusalem, there to 1954.

During mandatory service in the Israeli Air Force from 1954, he was the art director of its books and other publications. While there, he attended a class on postage-stamp design taught by Abram Games, who became his mentor and friend. Subsequently, he traveled, studied, and worked in Europe: from 1957 in Brussels and then onto London where, 1964–66, studied stage and three-dimensional design at the Central School of Art and Design, designed posters for Britain's Royal Mail, and worked for other clients while making intermittent visits to Israel. Then in 1966, he returned permanently to Israel and established a studio in Tel Aviv and later in Giv'atayim.

His work has been included in numerous international group and one-person exhibitions. A large number of social-, political-, and cultural-theme posters and other graphic design, such as calendars, packaging, and more than 150 logos are superior to much of his fine art. He designed a new logo for El Al airlines (1972), and the 50-meter-long aluminum-cast relief (1978) of a biblical quotation in Hebrew on the exterior of the Yad Vashem, Israel's official museum/memorial to Holocaust victims, in Jerusalem. He has also designed logos for the Tel Aviv Museum of Arts, Tefen Museum of Arts, and Habima Theater (הבימה - התיאטרון הלאומי) the symbol and posters of the 9th-15th Maccabiah Games (מַכַּבִּיָּה), and the logo for a non-profit organisation for children with cancer in Israel, the Hayim Association (1986).

His widely published, self-produced poster “Again?” (1993) depicts a Nazi swastika (which Reisinger incorrectly made to face left) breaking apart into the five-pointed red star of the Soviet Union, referencing a feared possible repeat of the Holocaust. The influences on his work—itself more widely focused than solely on social and political issues—have come from colorists, Minimalists, Constructivists, and humorists. He claims one of his more significant contributions has been to stretch the visual and communicative possibilities of Hebrew letters through his symbols and logos. Reisinger is one of Israel's most-accomplished graphic designers; the others include Franz Kraus (1905–98), Gabriel and Maxim Shamir (1909–92, 1910–90), and David Tartakover (b. 1944).

Reisinger designed the three IDF decorations the Medal of Valor, the Medal of Courage and the Medal of Distinguished Service.

== Recent exhibitions ==
- 2004 A traveling exhibition of posters, Hungary

"Ways," a traveling exhibition of selected design works, prints, drawings, and paintings:

- 2005 Museum of Applied Arts, Budapest
- 2005 Cvijeta Zuzoric Pavilion, Belgrade
- 2006 Ion Mincu Faculty of Architecture and Urbanism, University of Bucharest
- 2007 Central Academy of Fine Arts (CAFA), Beijing
- 2008 Taipei Fine Arts Museum (TFAM), Taiwan (“The Art of Design” retitled from “Ways”)

== Awards ==
1954 Herman Struck Prize for poster design, Bezalel Academy of Art and Design, Jerusalem

1957 - First prize for the poster of the Palais International de la Science, Expo 58, Brussels

1974 Nordau Prize for Design

1981 Herzl Prize for Contribution to Design in Israel

1984 First Alumni Prize, Bezalel Academy of Art and Design, Jerusalem

1998 Israel Prize for design, the first award of such prize to a designer

Knights' Cross of the Order of Merit, Republic of Hungary

== Bibliography ==
- Goldfine, Gil. "Dan Reisinger." Graphis magazine (vol. 47, 1991, pp. 80–91)
- Leu, Olaf. "Dan Resinger: A Champion of Visual Culture." Novum magazine (1996, pp. 60–67)
- Tszorf, Maurice. "Color, Form, Function: Dan Reisinger's New Residence in Caeserea," Graphis magazine (vol. 56, no. 329, 2000, pp. 66–75)
- Bing'nan, Yu (introduction). Dan Reisinger (text in English and Chinese), Beijing: Tsinghua (2000). | ISBN 7-302-04842-8
- "Q&A with Dan Reisinger," Graphis magazine (no. 344, March/April 2003)
- Serov, Dr. Serge, and Anikst, Michail, A Russian-language book of Reisinger's work in the series "The Stars of Graphic Design," Moscow: Alma Mater (2008)

== See also ==
- List of Israel Prize recipients
