= Rina Zaizov Marx =

Israeli doctor

Zaizov Marx, Rina
- רינה זייזוב מרקס
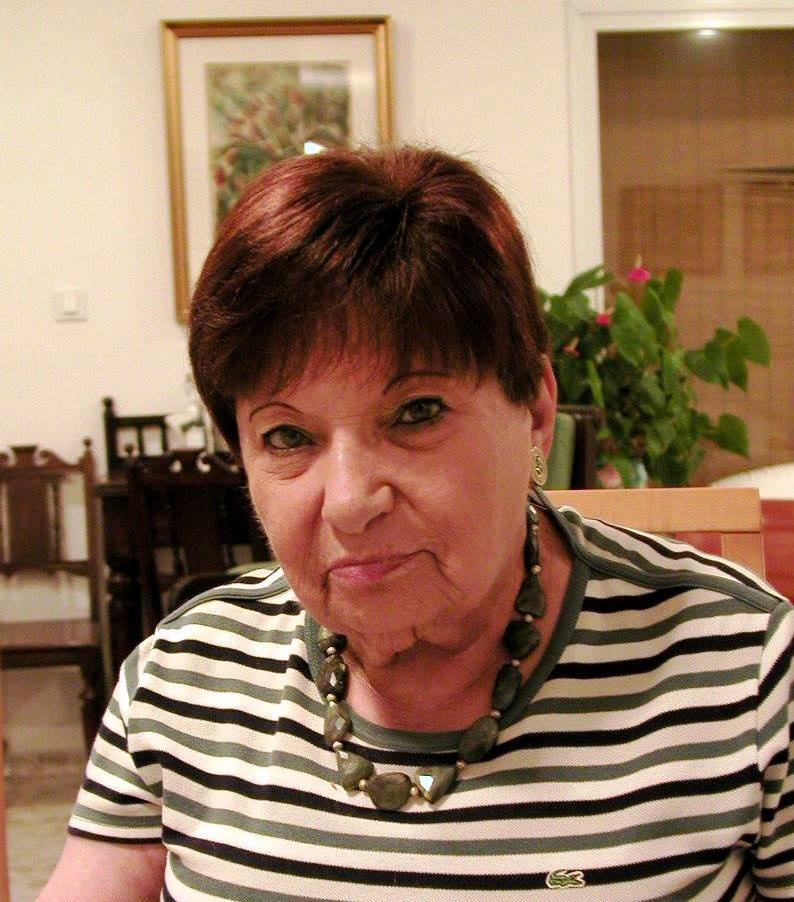
- Born: July 8, 1932
- Died: May 31, 2005 (aged 72)
- Occupation: Hemato-oncology pediatrician

Prof. Rina Zaizov Marx (Hebrew: רינה זייזוב מרקס; July 8, 1932 – May 31, 2005) the Israel Prize laureate for Medicine for 2005, was a renowned pediatrician who specialized in hemato-oncology. She established and directed the pediatric oncology ward at Schneider Children's Medical Center of Israel and was one of the most prominent researchers in the fields of hematology in the country. and the founder of the Hayim Association.
