= Jeremy's Circle =

Israeli charity

- Type: Israeli Registered Charity
- Founded: 2008
- Founder: Pamela Becker, Juliette Coleman, Naomi Coleman
- Headquarters: Tel Aviv, Israel
- Website: www.jeremyscircle.org

Jeremy's Circle is an Israeli-registered charity (amuta) that offers a supportive community for children and early teens growing up with cancer in their families, or who have suffered a cancer loss.

== History ==
Initially conceived by Jeremy Coleman, a father of three young children, while he underwent treatment for stage 4 stomach cancer, Jeremy's Circle was established shortly after he died by his wife Pamela Becker and his sisters Juliette and Naomi Coleman in 2008.

== Projects ==
The group holds fun days for kids throughout the year and during school vacations. Activities are intended to provide fun and friendship, along with respite, from the stress of cancer treatment or loss in the family, and to give a sense of normalcy in a far-from-normal situation. As of November 2021, the organization supports approximately 700 young families across Israel.
