= Friends of Schneider =

Coordinates: 32°5′17″N 34°52′3″E

- Friends of Schneider Children's Medical Center of Israel
- נאמני מרכז שניידר
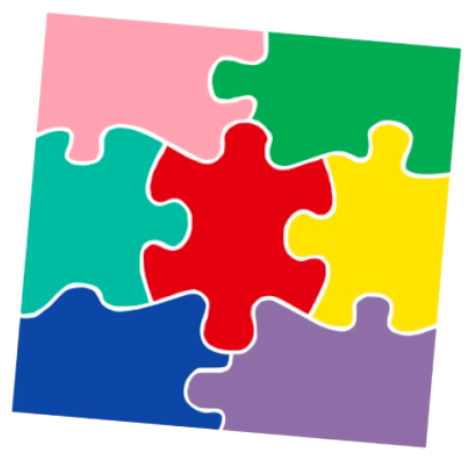
- Logo Friends of Schneider
- Pronunciation: Neemaney Merkaz Schneider
- Formation: 1992
- Type: Nonprofit
- Registration no.: IL 580168987
- Legal status: charity
- Purpose: children health
- Headquarters: Schneider Children's Medical Center of Israel
- Official language: Hebrew, English
- Chairperson: Ayelet Shaked
- Website: fos.org.il

Friends of Schneider (Hebrew: נאמני מרכז שניידר) is the official charity of Schneider Children's Medical Center of Israel.

== History ==
The friends organisation, initiated by Prof. Haim Doron, began operating in 1992, shortly after the establishment of hospital in 1991.

The first president of the association was Aura Herzog, the wife of Chaim Herzog who served at the time as the President of the State of Israel.

== Activities ==
Friends of Schneider is an association of friends which has been active on behalf of the Schneider Children's Medical Center of Israel since its inception in 1992.

It was established for the purpose of enhancing the development and advancement of the hospital and has, over the years, been instrumental in raising funds for construction, acquisition of medical equipment, research grants, and special projects and programs. Friends regularly arranges fundraising events in Israel in order to attain its goals. Efforts are currently focused on raising funds for the construction of the planned new building.

As a registered non-profit association, Friends of Schneider Children's is composed mostly of volunteers, but employs some paid workers. Since its founding, the group has found volunteers from many groups of society, including the business, public, and social sectors. Contributions go towards Schneider Children’s needs, as approved by the hospital administration and the association.

== See also ==
- Schneider Children's Medical Center of Israel
