= Schneider Children's Medical Center of Israel =

Hospital in Petah Tikva, Israel

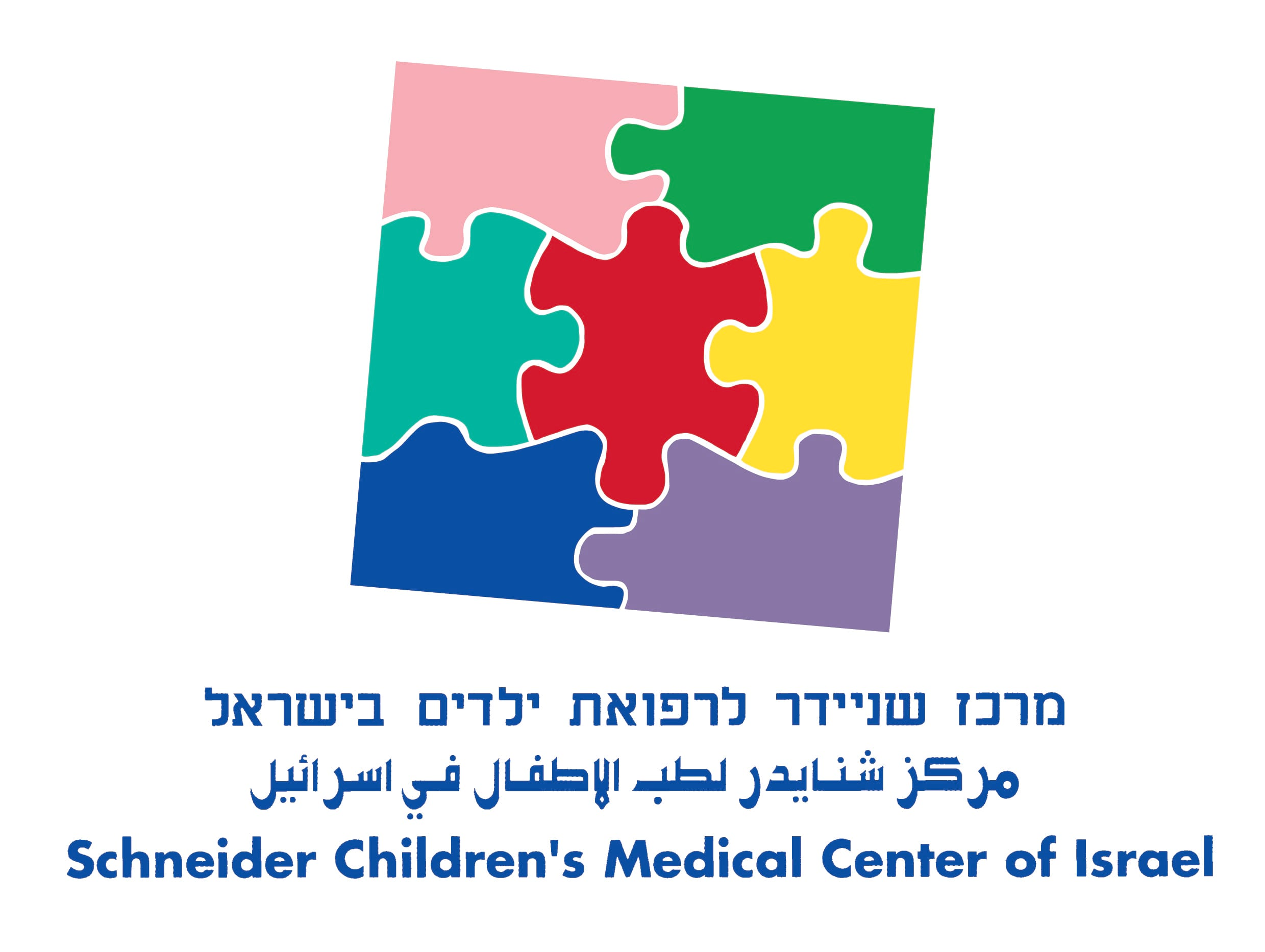

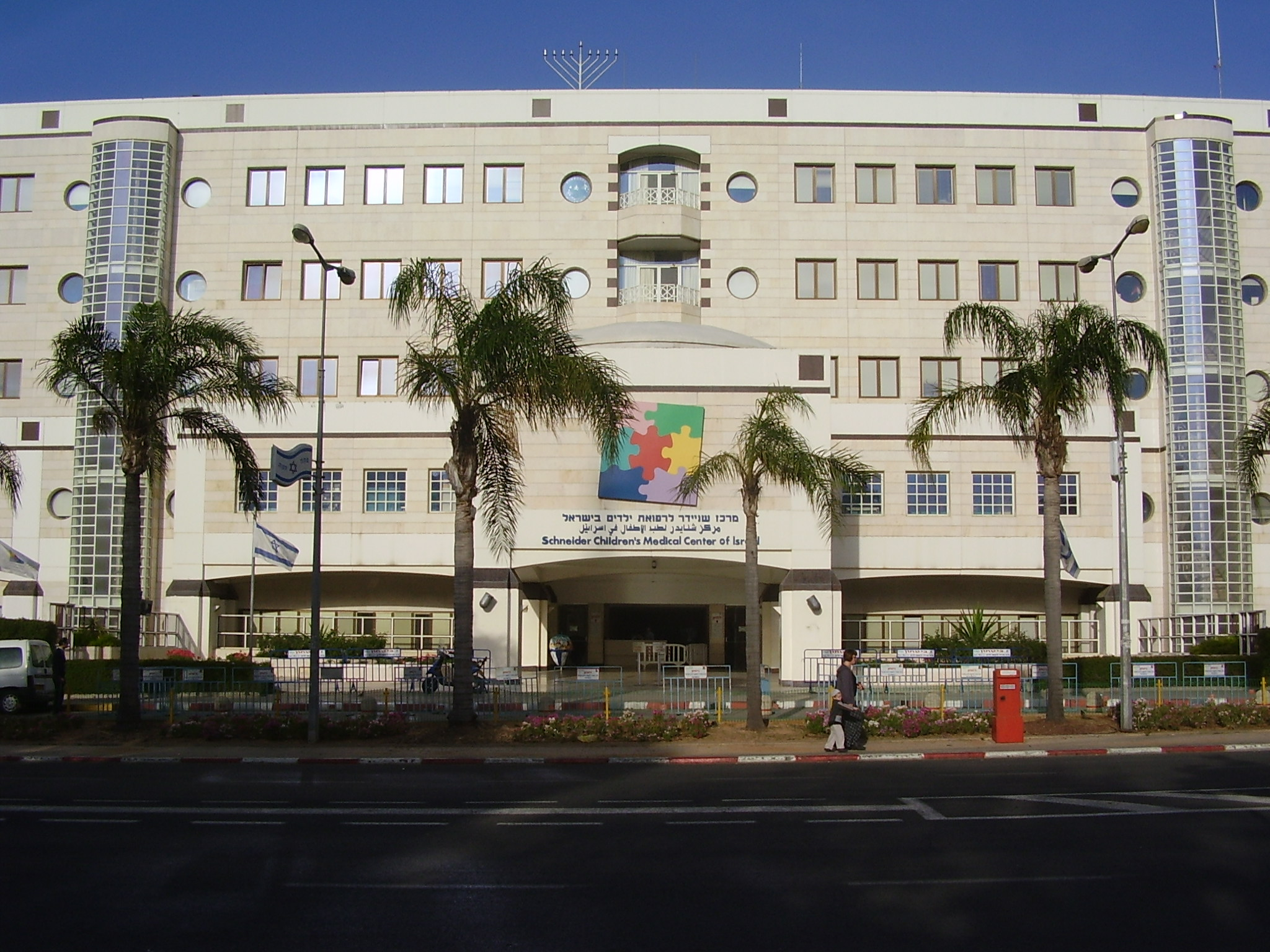
- Main entrance

Geography
- Location: 14 Kaplan St. Petah Tikva, Israel
- Coordinates: 32°5′17″N 34°52′3″E

Services
- Standards: The Joint Commission (JCAHO) accreditation, ISO 14000
- Emergency department: Yes
- Beds: 258

Helipads
- Helipad: Yes

History
- Opened: April 1992

Links
- Website: www.schneider.org.il

Schneider Children's Medical Center of Israel, founded in November 1991, is a paediatric hospital focused on children's health, particularly organ transplantation and cancers. Schneider treats infants, children, teens, and young adults up to age 18 and for some conditions, age 21.

== Overview ==
- 7 floors
- 35,000 sq. meters (376,736 sq. feet)
- 271 beds including 50 for day care
- 44% critical care and special care beds
- 1,500 employees
- 350 Physicians with advanced specialty and subspecialty paediatric training
- 550 Pediatric Nurses and Nurse Assistants
- 100 Paramedical Staff (Social Workers, Physical and Occupational Therapists, Psychologists and Dieticians)
- 6 operating theaters
- 2 Cardiac Catheterization Labs
- 3 specially oriented intensive care units
- The combined skills of 800 health professionals

Annual Activities

- 275,000 visits and treatments
- 54,000 visits to the Emergency Medicine Department (ER) - busiest in the country
- 13,500 admissions, amounting to some 78,000 hospitalization days
- 8,200 surgeries including 500 cardiac and vascular surgeries and about 220 neurosurgeries
- 440 dialysis treatments
- 1,200 catheterizations
- 60 cochlear implants
- 40 organ transplantations

Online Pediatricians

- Digital medical responses after-hours
- Pediatric medical consultations via telephone and videoconferencing

== History ==
On October 29, 1991, the Schneider Children's Medical Center of Israel was founded on the hospital grounds, the largest such facility in Israel. It opened to the public in April 1992. It spans an area of 35,000 sq. meters. It was named after two major benefactors, Irving and Helen Schneider. It was designed by Marvin Bostin and Jerry Switzer.

In 2025, the center opened the Bibas Family Playroom, named in honor of Ariel and Kfir Bibas, who were kidnapped in the Nir Oz attack and killed.

== Treatments ==
National Referral Center

- Hematology-Oncology
- Cardiology
- Endocrinology and Childhood Diabetes
- Organ and Bone Marrow Transplantation

New Clinical Genetics

- Diseases and genes discovered
- Chromosomal microarray
- Exome sequencing

Else

- Endoscopic repair of laryngeal cleft in 2.5 kg preemie
- Video capsule endoscopy for children <2 years
- Artificial pancreas trials outside hospital
- Joint ancestor gene discovery in CDA-II patients
- Local anesthesia for meatal stenosis
- Defibrillator implanted in 4-month-old
- New genes discovered for mental retardation
- Open-heart surgery in 800gm preemie
- Percutaneous aortic valve replacement
- Multiple organ transplant

== Academic and research ==
- Two Israel Prize laureates for Medical Research
- Affiliated with the Sackler School of Medicine, Tel Aviv University
- 5 physicians on Medical Management Faculty at Tel Aviv University, Tel Aviv University Faculty of Medicine (highest percentage per capita of all 16 TAU-affiliated teaching hospitals)
- 50% staff on Faculty
- 15% hold title of Professor
- In 2020, Schneider Children's Medical Center and Weizmann Institute of Science aim to establish the Schneider-Weizmann Center for Research on Child and Adult Health.

== Support ==
Friends of Schneider is a non-profit Friends Association that has been supporting Schneider Children's Medical Center of Israel since its foundation. The Association was established to promote the development and advancement of the hospital and works to raise funds for construction, acquisition of medical equipment, research grants, and special projects.
