= Rawa Mazowiecka =

Town in Łódź Voivodeship, Poland

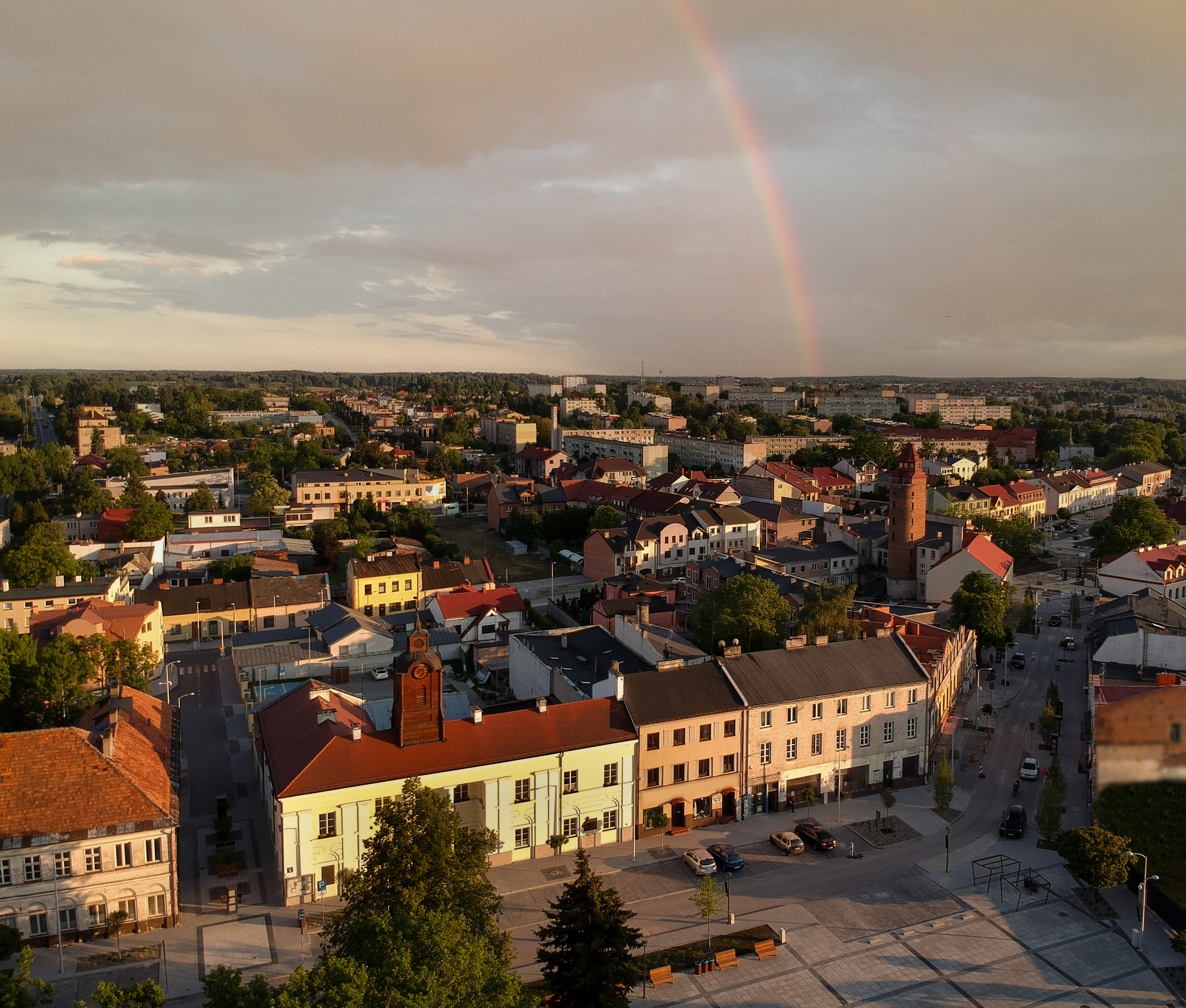
- Aerial view of the town center

- Flag Coat of arms
- Interactive map of Rawa Mazowiecka
- Location within Poland
- Coordinates: 51°45′57″N 20°15′12″E
- Country: Poland
- Voivodeship: Łódź
- County: Rawa
- Gmina: Rawa Mazowiecka (urban gmina)
- First mentioned: 1228
- Town rights: 1321

Government
  - Mayor: Piotr Irla

Area
  - Total: 14.28 km^{2} (5.51 sq mi)

Population (31 December 2022)
  - Total: 16,090 ▼
  - Density: 1,127/km^{2} (2,918/sq mi)
- Time zone: UTC+1 (CET)
  - Summer (DST): UTC+2 (CEST)
- Postal code: 96-200 - 96-201
- Car plates: ERW
- Website: https://www.rawamazowiecka.pl/

Rawa Mazowiecka [ˈrava mazɔˈvʲɛt͡ska] is a town in central Poland, with 16,090 inhabitants (2022). It lies in the Łódź Voivodeship and is the capital of the Rawa County.

Rawa is a former medieval ducal seat of the Piast dynasty and an early modern provincial capital and royal city of Poland. From 1562 the city hosted the Rawa Treasury for the Polish army. It prospered thanks to its location on important trade routes, then in the 19th century it became a center of cloth manufacturing, and currently it is a center of the food and light industries. The town features heritage sites in a variety of styles, including Gothic, Baroque and Neoclassical and a regional museum.

== History ==
=== Prehistory and antiquity ===
During an excavation in 1948, a hoard wealth deposit dating from 600 BC was found containing 4 underground rooms with barrels of gold and silver. A smaller treasure was found containing mainly bronze artefacts from the Trzciniec culture, dating from around 1700 BC. Ancient Roman coins – denarii of emperors Hadrian and Marcus Aurelius – have also been found within the town limits.

=== Medieval and early modern period ===
Rawa has a long and rich history. First mentioned in 1288, it received city rights in 1321. It used to be one of the most important cities of both the Kingdom of Poland and Polish–Lithuanian Commonwealth, a Polish royal city and a capital of Rawa Voivodeship, a unit of administrative division which existed from 1462 until 1793 within the larger Greater Poland Province. The starosta of Rawa was among most important personalities of early Poland, as he controlled the so-called “Rawa Treasury” - a large sum of tax money, kept at Rawa Castle for financing regular army units.

Rawa Mazowiecka was first mentioned as a medieval gord, probably located on one of the local hills. In 1321, it received town charter, and in 1355-1370, a brick castle of Mazovian Dukes was built here. During the reign of Siemowit III, Duke of Masovia, Rawa was the capital of the whole Duchy of Masovia.

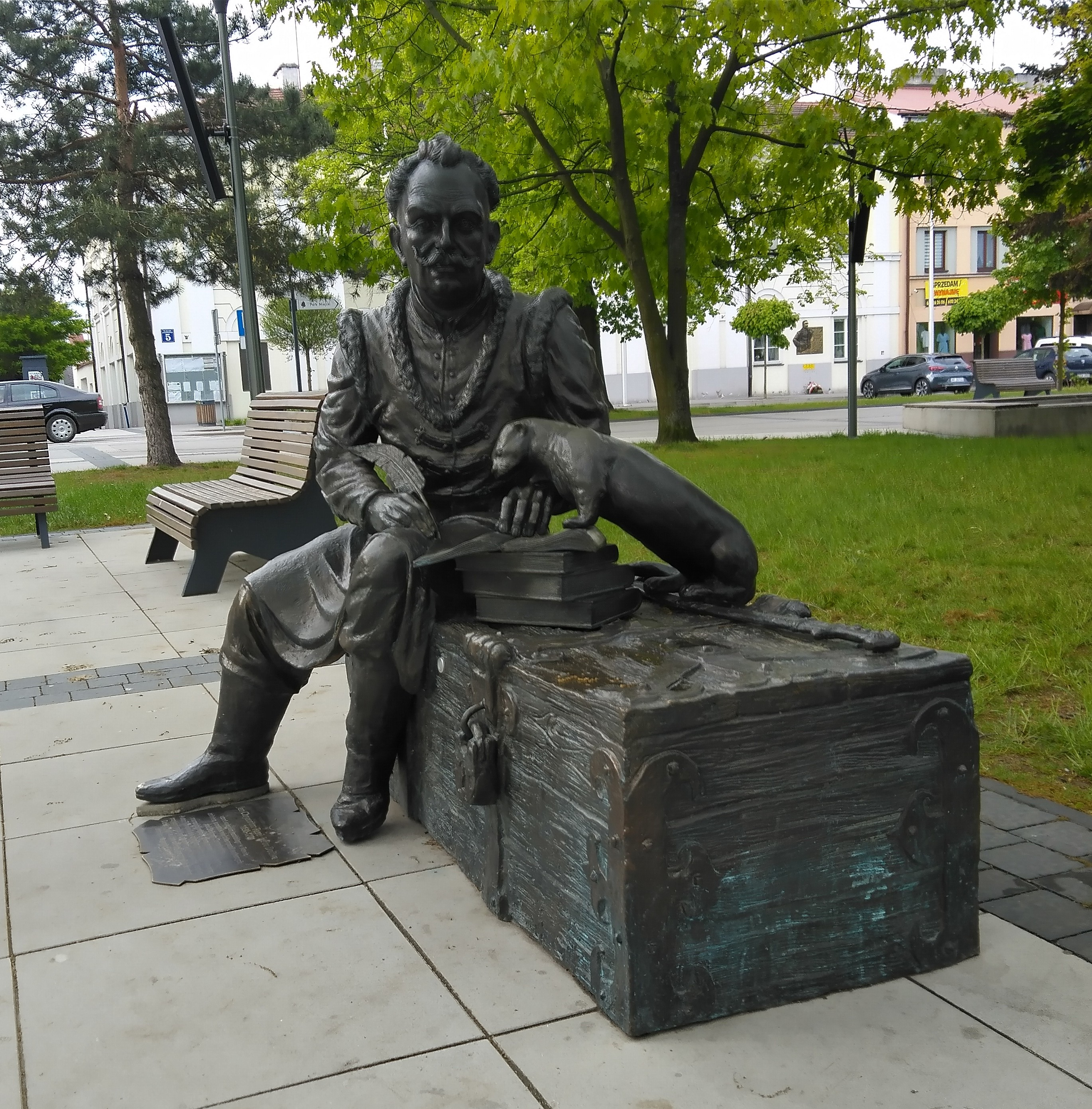
Jan Chryzostom Pasek Monument

In 1462, Rawa was incorporated directly into Poland, and named the capital of a voivodeship. The town prospered: wars of the 14th and 15th centuries did not affect Rawa. It was one of the largest cities of Mazovia. In 1613, a Jesuit church was built here, and by 1622, the Jesuit collegium was completed. Among its students was Jan Chryzostom Pasek, nobleman and writer best remembered for his memoirs.

The period of prosperity ended during the catastrophic Swedish invasion of Poland (1655–1660), when Rawa was captured by Swedes (September 8, 1655), who completely destroyed both town and castle (1657). Rawa never recovered from the destruction, and even though it continued to be the capital of Rawa Voivodeship, the town lost importance. In 1676, its population was only 100. In 1702, Swedish forces returned during the Great Northern War, once again destroying the town. One of two main routes connecting Warsaw and Dresden ran through the town in the 18th century and Kings Augustus II the Strong and Augustus III of Poland often traveled that route. In 1766, most of Rawa burned in a fire.

=== Late modern period ===
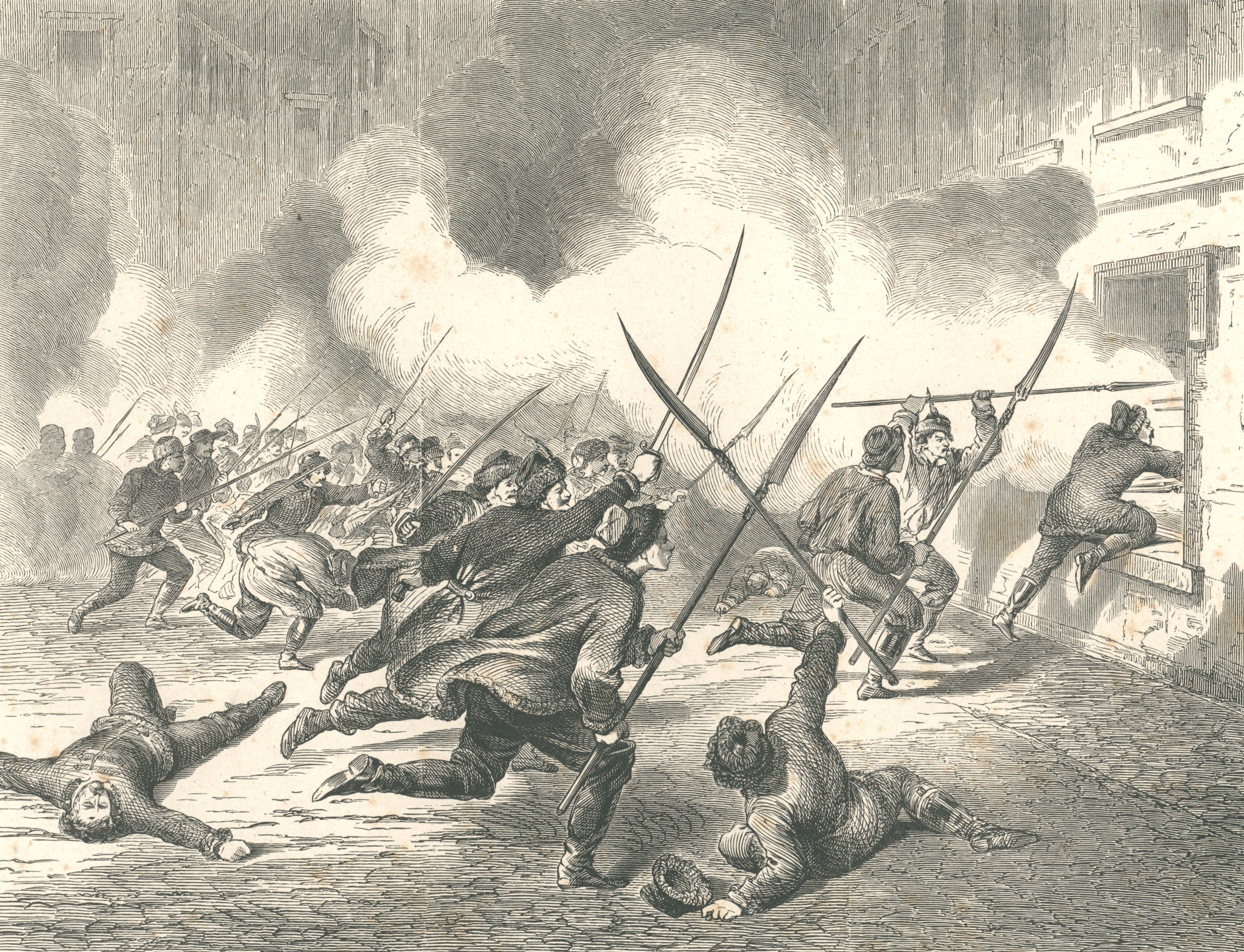
Battle of Rawa (1863)

On February 4, 1793, the town was seized by the Kingdom of Prussia during the Second Partition of Poland. In 1800, Rawa County was created, and in November 1806, during the Napoleonic Wars, Prussians left the town. It became part of the newly formed Duchy of Warsaw.

Since 1815, following Napoleon's defeat, Rawa became part of the Russian-controlled Congress Poland. In 1822, a town hall was built together with tenement houses in the main town square, and in 1829-1830 a hospital was completed. Rawa quickly modernized, but this process was halted by the Tsarist repressions after the failed November Uprising of 1830. On February 4, 1863, Rawa was captured by Polish insurgents of the January Uprising. Another clash between Polish insurgents and Russian troops took place on December 10, 1863. The town was almost completely destroyed in 1915 during World War I. After the war, in 1918, it was reintegrated with Poland, as the country regained independence.

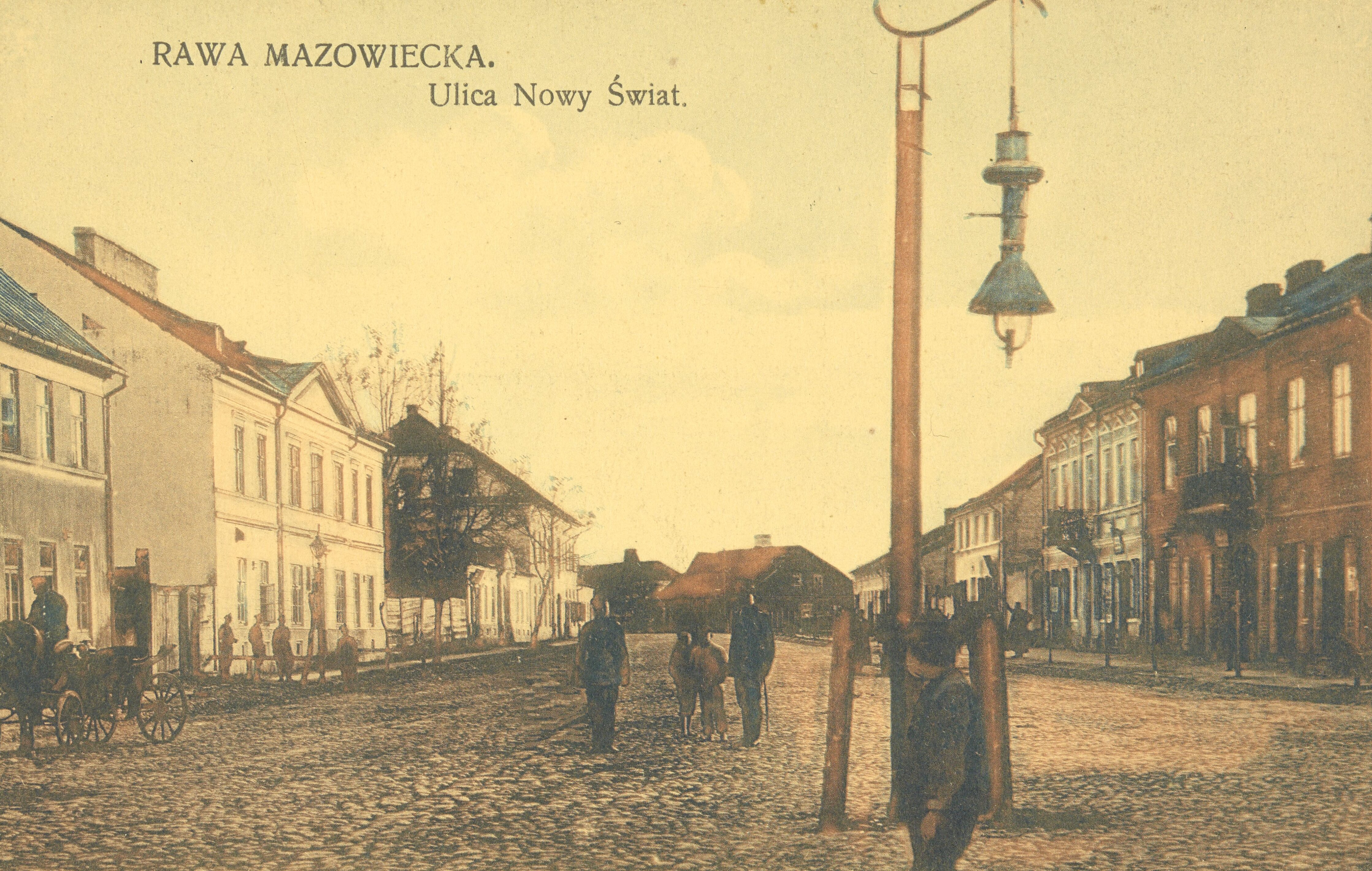
Rawa in the early 20th century

=== World War II ===
During the joint German-Soviet invasion of Poland, which started World War II, Rawa was invaded by Germany, and already on September 10, German troops carried out a massacre of 40 inhabitants (17 Poles and 23 Jews) in the town. In mid-September 1939, the Germans established a prisoner-of-war camp for captured Polish soldiers in the town. Under German occupation, the town was administered as part of the Radom District of the General Government. Some of the Poles expelled from the Gostyń County in German-annexed Greater Poland in December 1939 were deported to Rawa. During the AB-Aktion, Germans arrested 20 Poles in mid-June 1940, among whom was parish priest Wacław Zienkowski, who joined the Polish resistance movement, helped Polish prisoners of war escape from the local German POW camp, and rescued local Jews. He was murdered in August 1940 in the Sachsenhausen concentration camp.

The Nazi Germans established a Jewish ghetto in Rawa Mazowiecka in March 1941. As Krzysztof Urbański informs in his monograph Zagłada Żydów w dystrykcie radomskim, the ghetto consisted of two parts: one area consisted of a district called Jewish, and the second part was located at Łowicka Street. The two zones spread across the eastern part of town from the bridge on Rawka river to the bridge on Rylka river near the hospital. At the same time the area included the streets of Studzienna, Zatylna, Starościanska, Bóźnicza and Zamkowa Wola.

In March 1942, the Germans killed the two Świderski brothers, members of the Polish resistance movement, who operated a secret Polish printing house in the town.

By 1942, the number of Jewish prisoners in the Rawa ghetto grew to four thousand. Typhus epidemic broke out due to poor sanitary conditions. The Jews died as the result of a starvation diet and occasional executions carried out in the castle. The murderous liquidation of the ghetto began on 27 October 1942. The day before the action, about four thousand Jews from Biała Rawska were brought to Rawa Mazowiecka and spent that night in the open air. In the morning, the Germans surrounded the ghetto. The Jews were forced to leave their homes, grouped together and then deported aboard Holocaust trains to the Treblinka extermination camp. Many town residents were shot during the ghetto liquidation action.

German occupation ended in January 1945. As a result of World War II, 60% of all buildings were left in ruins.

The two sons of Franciszek Gajowniczek (for whom, as a family man, Maximilian Kolbe had given his life) were killed during the Soviet bombardment of Rawa in January 1945.

== Demographics ==
Historical population
Year	Pop.	±%
1921	7,499	—
1931	9,200	+22.7%
1939	9,257	+0.6%
1950	6,599	−28.7%
1960	8,441	+27.9%
2010	17,508	+107.4%

== Sights ==
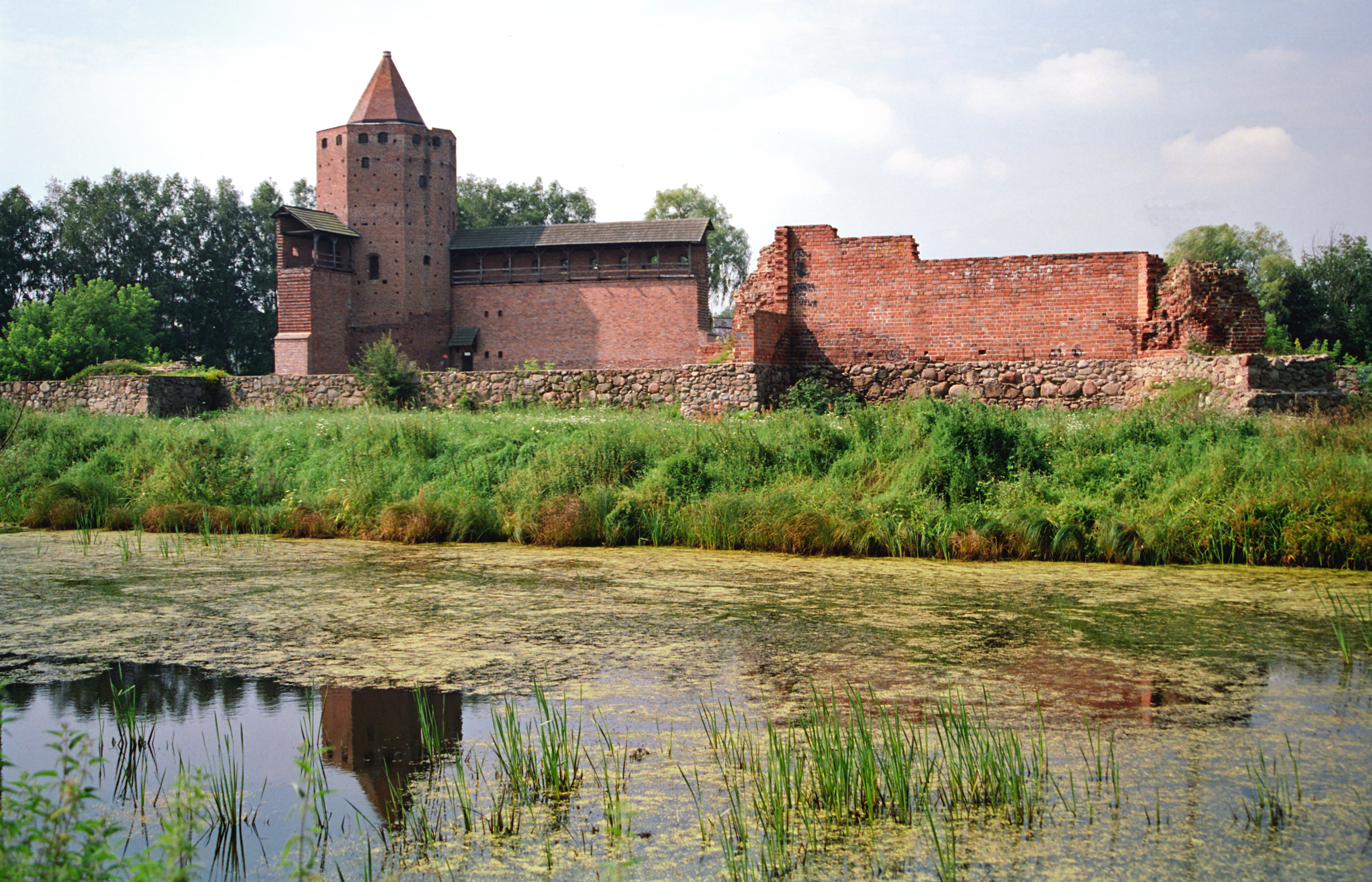
Castle

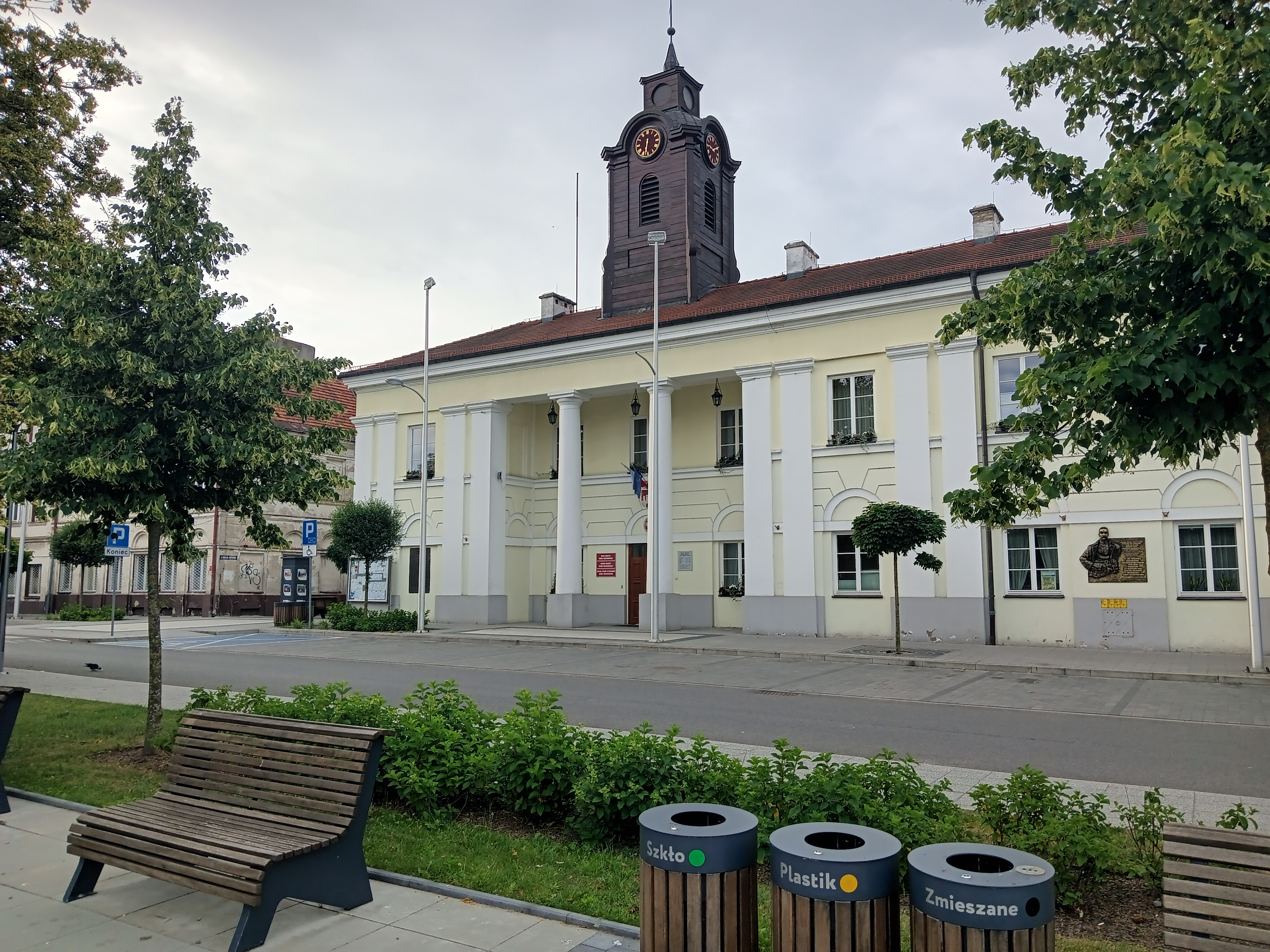
Town Hall

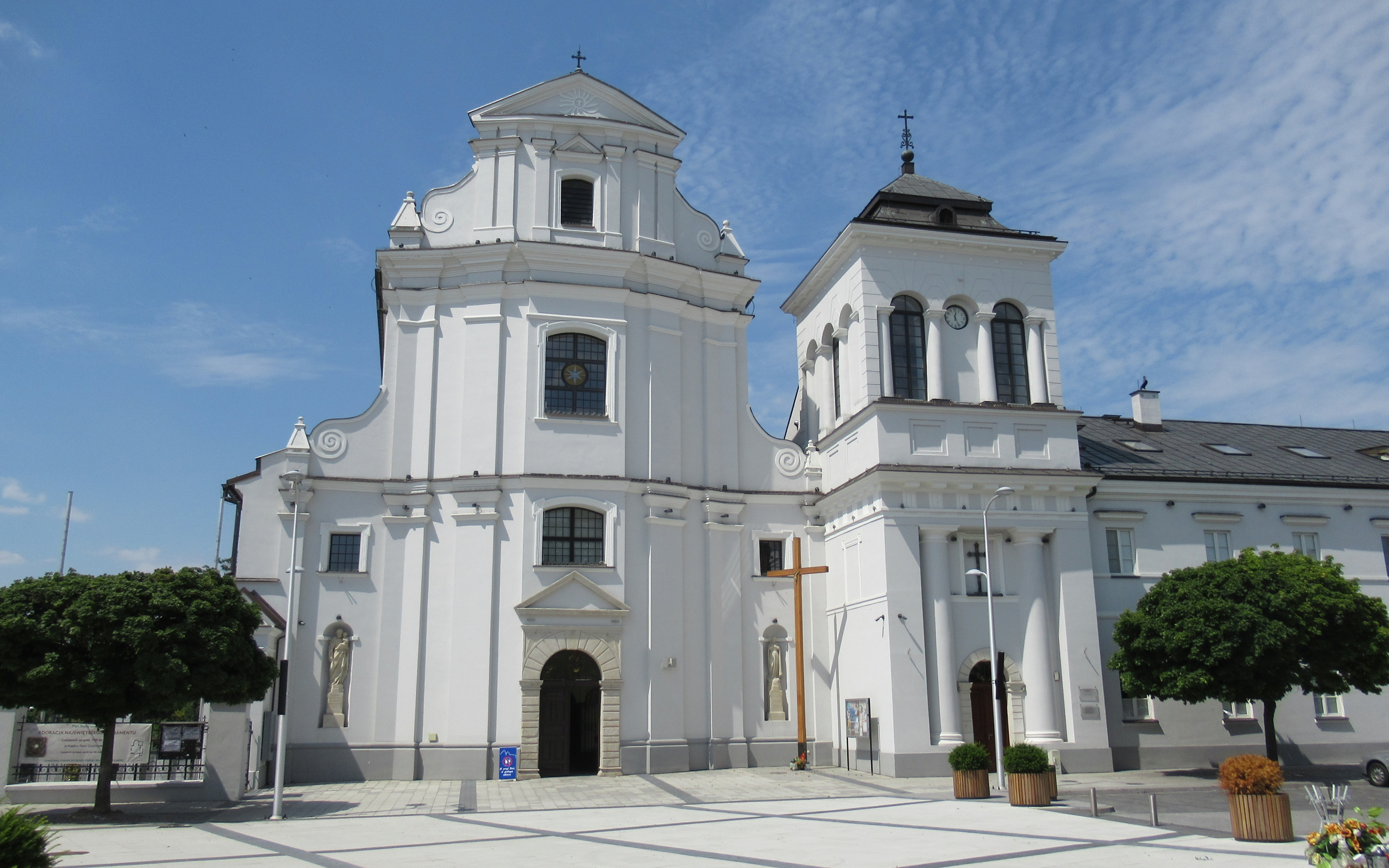
Baroque Immaculate Conception church

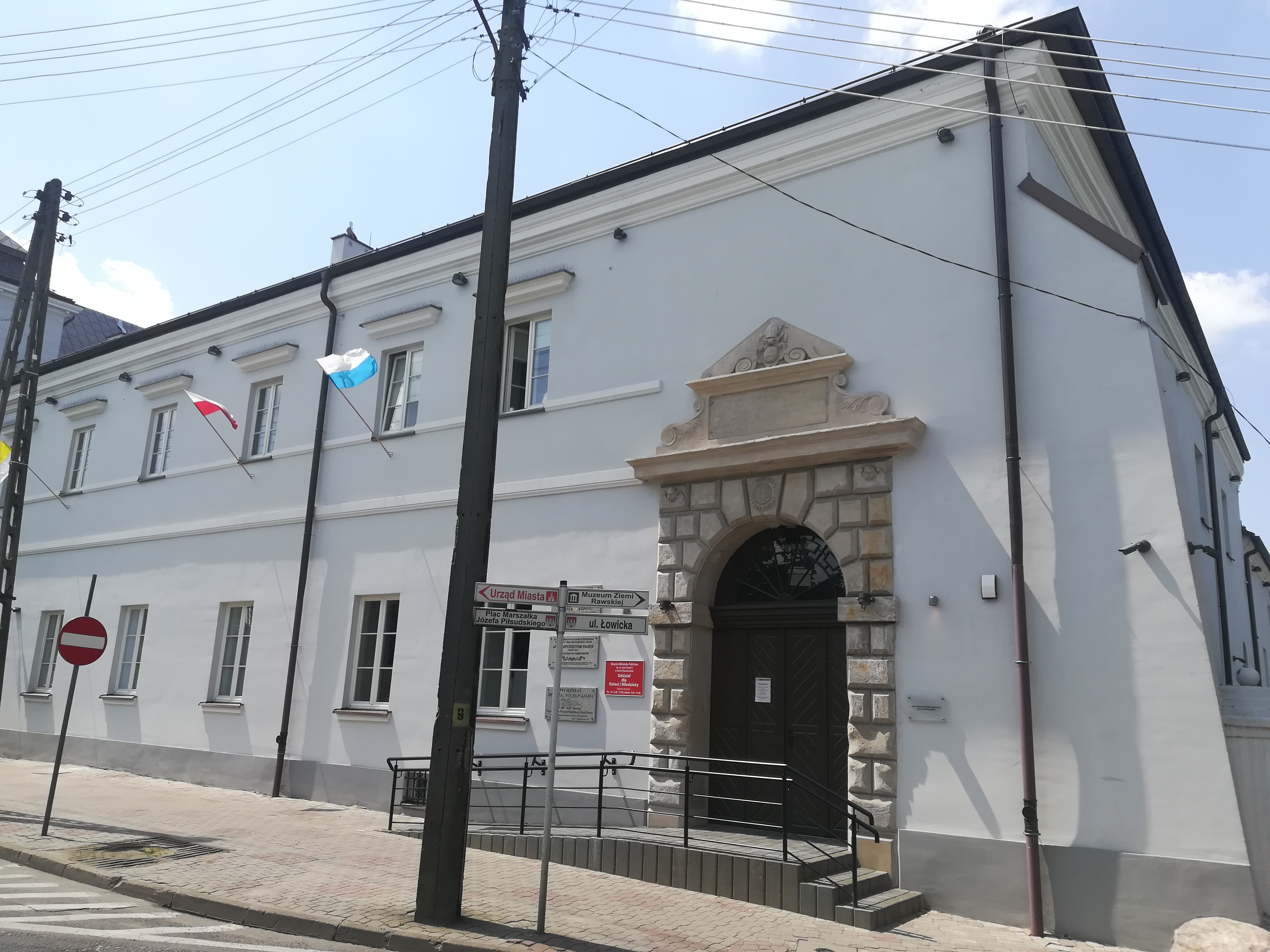
Former Jesuit college

The picturesque Rawa Castle was built by King Casimir III the Great in order to oversee and protect the southern parts of Mazovia, according to the ancient Chronicle of Jan Długosz. Another chronicler, Jan of Czarnków claimed however that the Castle was founded by Siemowit III, Duke of Masovia. It is not known when the construction began: probably it was in 1355. The castle was not completed until 1370, and by then, it served as the administrative center of the Duchy of Rawa, which was independent in 1455-62. On December 7, 1462, King Casimir IV visited the castle, announcing the incorporation of the Duchy of Rawa, and creation of Rawa Voivodeship.

In 1507, the complex burned in a fire, and two years ago, its reconstruction began. After ten years, the walls and the tower were strengthened. Since Rawa Castle was regarded as a modern fortress, in 1559 the so-called Rawa Treasure was placed here: the tax money needed to finance the regular army. Development of military technology made the complex obsolete by the mid-17th century. In September 1655, it was captured by Swedes during the Deluge. In 1657, before their retreat, Swedish soldiers blew up most of the complex; only the tower and fragments of walls remained. Soon afterwards, high ranking Swedish officer Pontus De La Gardie was temporarily imprisoned in the remains of the castle.

After the destruction of 1657, the complex was not rebuilt, and by the early 18th century, it was a ruin. In 1789, the Sejm assigned money for its reconstruction, and assigned the task to Starosta of Rawa, Feliks Lanckoroński. His efforts most likely failed, as by 1794 the castle was abandoned. Prussian authorities ordered its demolition, in order to gain building materials. As a result, only the tower remained, with fragments of walls.

In 1601 Carl Gyllenhielm, the so-called royal bastard, was brought to Rawa. Gyllenhjelm was captured in Valmiera by Lithuanians of Krzysztof Mikołaj "the Thunderbolt" Radziwiłł and Poles of Jan Zamoyski, during the Polish–Swedish War (1600–11). It is not known how long the Swedish official was kept here. Another famous prisoner of the Rawa Castle was Wawrzyniec Gradowski, a sorcerer and courtier of King Stephen Bathory, who in 1578 tried to poison him. Gradowski was locked in the castle, and died there.

Other notable landmarks include the Baroque churches of the Immaculate Conception and of the Assumption.

== Transport ==
The S8 expressway bypasses Rawa Mazowiecka to the east. Rawa Mazowiecka Północ exit of the expressway provides quick access to Warsaw and to Łódź.

National road 72 bypasses the town to the north.

The nearest railway station is in Tomaszów Mazowiecki.

== Sports ==
The local football club is Mazovia Rawa Mazowiecka, which is also known as RKS Mazovia. It competes in the fourth league.

== Notable people ==
- Halina Konopacka (1900–1989), discus thrower, Olympic champion
- Edward Pietrzyk (1949–2021), military officer and diplomat
- Janusz Wojciechowski (born 1954), politician, EU Commissioner for Agriculture
- Adrian Bartosiński (born 1995), professional mixed martial artist

== Twin towns ==
Rawa Mazowiecka is twinned with:

- Nyírbátor, Hungary
- Boskovice, Czech Republic

== See also ==
- Rava-Ruska founded in 1455 by Prince Władysław I of Płock
