= Seibo no Kishi Monastery =

Conventual Franciscan monastery complex in Nagasaki, Japan

Coordinates: 32°45′02″N 129°53′56″E

- 聖母の騎士修道院

Religion
- Affiliation: Roman Catholic

Location
- Location: Hongouchi, Nagasaki, Japan

Architecture
- Established: 1931

Seibo no Kishi Monastery (聖母の騎士修道院, Seibo no Kishi Shūdōin), historically associated with Mugenzai no Sono (無原罪の園, "Garden of the Immaculate"), is a Conventual Franciscan monastery complex in Nagasaki, Japan. It was founded in 1931 by the Polish Franciscan missionary Maximilian Kolbe and became the centre of his Japanese mission, publishing work and Marian apostolate in East Asia. The complex is located on a hillside in the Hongouchi district of Nagasaki and includes a friary, church, school-related institutions, a publishing house and the Saint Kolbe Memorial Museum.

== History ==
Maximilian Kolbe arrived in Nagasaki on 24 April 1930, after an unsuccessful attempt to establish a mission in China. Although he initially knew neither the Japanese language nor local conditions, he was permitted by the bishop of Nagasaki to remain, on condition that he teach philosophy and theology at the local seminary. Kolbe and his companions soon established a Japanese branch of the Militia Immaculatae and began publishing a Japanese-language version of the Knight of the Immaculata, titled Seibo no Kishi ("Knight of the Immaculate").

The monastery was built on the southern slope of Mount Hikosan, a site that local Catholics reportedly considered inconvenient and unsuitable. Later accounts connect the choice of location with Franciscan poverty, as the steep hillside land was inexpensive and required considerable work before construction could proceed. The Japanese mission was modelled on Kolbe's Polish foundation at Niepokalanów, and for this reason it has sometimes been described as the "Japanese Niepokalanów".

Kolbe named the site Mugenzai no Sono, or "Garden of the Immaculate". The grounds included a Marian garden and a grotto inspired by Lourdes. A church connected with the mission was consecrated on 15 August 1934. Kolbe left Japan in 1936 and returned to Poland, where he was later arrested under the German occupation and killed in Auschwitz concentration camp in 1941.

== Atomic bombing and later history ==
On 9 August 1945, Nagasaki was devastated by the atomic bomb dropped by the United States. The Franciscan monastery survived the blast with comparatively limited damage, largely because its hillside location was shielded by the surrounding terrain and was not directly exposed to the shock wave. Contemporary Catholic accounts have often contrasted the survival of the Hongouchi monastery with the destruction of much of Catholic Nagasaki, including the area around Urakami Cathedral.

The older wooden buildings later suffered damage in the post-war period, and much of the present complex consists of later reconstructions. One surviving historic object is an old brick stove or heating structure associated with the original mission complex. According to the Polonika Institute, the object was later protected after interest from the Japanese writer Shūsaku Endō and became part of the memorial display at the site.

Pope John Paul II visited the site on 26 February 1981, during his apostolic journey to Japan; the visit took place before Kolbe's canonisation in 1982.

== Publishing and education ==
Publishing was central to Kolbe's mission in Nagasaki. The Japanese Seibo no Kishi magazine appeared soon after his arrival and continued the Marian and missionary publishing model he had developed in Poland. The monastery also became connected with Catholic education. The Hongouchi Seminary, established in the 1930s, later developed into the educational institutions associated with Seibo no Kishi Gakuen.

The mission was also associated with Brother Zeno Żebrowski, a Polish Franciscan who had come to Japan with Kolbe. After Kolbe's return to Poland, Żebrowski remained in Japan and became known for charitable work, including assistance to children and to victims of the atomic bombing.

== Saint Kolbe Memorial Museum ==
The Saint Kolbe Memorial Museum is located within the monastery complex and preserves objects connected with Kolbe's Japanese mission. Its exhibits include photographs, liturgical objects, items of daily use, printing materials and archival issues of Seibo no Kishi. Nagasaki City lists the museum as a visitor site connected with Kolbe and gives its address as 2-2-1 Hongouchi, Nagasaki.
