= Wielgolas =

Wielgolas may refer to the following places:

- Wielgolas, Lublin Voivodeship (east Poland)
- Wielgolas, Mińsk County in Masovian Voivodeship (east-central Poland)
- Wielgolas, Pułtusk County in Masovian Voivodeship (east-central Poland)
