= Triumph of the Heart =

- Directed by: Anthony D'Ambrosio
- Written by: Anthony D'Ambrosio
- Produced by: Cecilia Stevenson; Sharon Oliphant; Ryan T. Johnson; Alex Ochman
- Starring: Marcin Kwaśny; Rowan Polonski; Christopher Sherwood
- Release date: September 12, 2025
- Running time: 118 minutes
- Countries: United States; Poland
- Language: English
- Box office: $629,666

Triumph of the Heart is a 2025 biographical historical drama film written and directed by Anthony D'Ambrosio. The film details the final days of Maximilian Kolbe, a Polish Catholic priest who volunteered to die in place of another prisoner in Auschwitz during World War II. It stars Marcin Kwaśny, Rowan Polonski and Christopher Sherwood.

== Plot ==
After a prisoner successfully escapes from Auschwitz concentration camp, SS-Hauptsturmfuhrer Karl Fritzsch selects ten men to be starved to death in an underground cell. When the last prisoner is beaten by camp guards, priest Maximilian Kolbe steps forward to take his place in the cell. As days pass, the prisoners come to know one another, and join in singing. Slowly, the men die of starvation and dehydration. After two weeks, Kolbe and three other men are the only ones who remain, and are executed with lethal injections.

== Cast ==
- Rowan Polonski as Albert
- Christopher Sherwood as Karl Fritzsch
- Sharon Oiliphant as Franziska
- Marcin Kwaśny as Maximilian Kolbe

== Release ==
The film was released in theaters on September 12, 2025.

== Reception ==
Terry Sherwood of Film Threat scored the film an 8 out of 10.

Christie Cronan of Common Sense Media awarded the film three stars out of five.
