= Dembe =

Dembe may refer to:

- Dembe (sport): a form of traditional Hausa boxing
- Dembe (DRC), a town in the Kivu region of the Democratic Republic of the Congo
- Dembe (Poland), a town in Poland
- Dembe (Eritrea), a town in Eritrea
- Dembe, Huambo, a town in Provincia do Huambo, Angola
- Dembe, Bie, a town in Provincia do Bie, Angola
- Dembe (Uganda), a town in Busoga Province, Uganda
- Dembe (Chad), a town in Prefecture du Ouaddai, Chad
- Dembe (Central African Republic), a town in the Central African Republic
- Dembe, Sulawesi, a town in Propinsi Sulawesi Utara, Indonesia
