= Peter Fehlner =

American Catholic priest and theologian (1931–2018)

Peter Damian Fehlner OFM Conv.

Orders
- Ordination: July 14, 1957

Personal details
- Born: July 20, 1931 Dolgeville, New York, U.S.
- Died: May 8, 2018 (aged 86) Chicopee, Massachusetts, U.S.

Peter Fehlner OFM Conv (July 20, 1931 – May 8, 2018), also known as Peter Damian Mary Fehlner, was an American Catholic priest, theologian, and Mariologist.

He was a member of the Roman Catholic Order of Friars Minor Conventual. After his Franciscan and theological formation and several decades of ministry in this Order, he joined the Franciscan Friars of the Immaculate in 1996, but in 2016 he professed again the Rule and the Constitutions of ancient Franciscan Conventual Order. From 2008 to 2014, he served as rector of the Shrine of Our Lady of Guadalupe in La Crosse, Wisconsin. He was also a professor of theology in the Franciscans' Institute of Ecclesiastical Studies, the Immaculatum (STIM) in Frigento, Italy. A scholar in the Franciscan tradition of theology, he focused primarily on the philosophical and theological traditions of St. Bonaventure, Bl. John Duns Scotus and St. Maximilian Kolbe.

== Early life, education and ordination ==
Fehlner was born on July 20, 1931, in Dolgeville, New York. He was ordained in Rome on July 14, 1957. He completed a Doctorate in Sacred Theology at the Seraphicum, with a thesis about the Ecclesiology of St. Bonaventure. Fehlner died on May 8, 2018, in Chicopee, Massachusetts.

== Theological career ==
Fehlner taught dogmatic theology and Mariology in Franciscan seminaries and universities in the United States and in Italy for 40 years. He is the author of several books and contributed to theological and pastoral journals in the United States and Europe. From 1985 to 1989 he was the editor of Militia Immaculatae (Rome), a Marian review for the clergy. He wrote and lectured extensively on Franciscan theology and Mariology. His series on Our Lady "Mater et Magistra" has been featured weekly on Mother Angelica's EWTN.

He served as North American Regional Superior (Delegatus Generalis) of the Institute of Pontifical Right of the Franciscan Friars of the Immaculate from 1996 until 2002.

Fehlner was a Kolbean scholar. He explained and defended the teachings of St. Maximilian Kolbe against theologians and mariologists who consider the Saint to be a heretic or a pious journalist. He wrote and spoke in support of the fifth Marian Dogma, the Blessed Virgin Mary's roles as Coredemptrix, Mediatrix and Advocate.

== Selected works ==
- The Role of Charity in the Ecclesiology of St. Bonaventure (1965)
- Mary and Theology: Scotus Revisited (1978)
- "The Immaculate Conception: Outer limits of love", MI, 25 (1989): 537–547.
- "Fr. Juniper Carol: His Mariology and scholarly achievement", Marian Studies, 43 (1992): 17–59.
- The Great Sign: The Virgin Mother - The Birth of Our Lord Jesus Christ (1999)
- "Mater et magistra Apostolorum", IM, 1 (1/2001): 15–95.
- "De metaphysica Mariana quaedam", IM, 1 (2/2001): 13–42.
- St. Maximilian Kolbe: Martyr of Charity – Pneumatologist (His Theology of the Holy Spirit) (2004)
