= Franciszek Gajowniczek =

Polish Army officer (1901-1995)

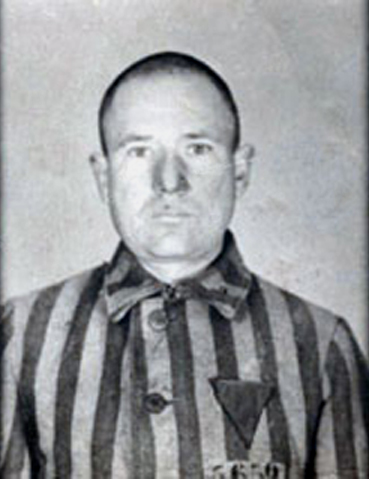
- Franciszek Gajowniczek, 1941, Auschwitz prisoner 5659
- Born: 15 November 1901; Strachomin, Congress Poland, Russian Empire
- Died: 13 March 1995 (aged 93); Brzeg, Poland
- Burial place: Niepokalanów
- Known for: Maximilian Kolbe sacrificed himself to save Gajowniczek
- Spouses: Helena (died 1977); Janina (survived him)
- Children: 2 sons, killed 1945
- Military career
- Allegiance: Poland
- Branch: Army
- Rank: Sergeant
- Unit: 36th Infantry Regiment
- Conflicts: May Coup, 1926; Defensive War, 1939: Defence of Wieluń; Battle of Modlin

Franciszek Gajowniczek (15 November 1901 – 13 March 1995) was a Polish army sergeant whose life was saved at the Auschwitz concentration camp by Catholic priest Maximilian Kolbe, who volunteered to die in his place.

Gajowniczek had been sent to Auschwitz concentration camp from a Gestapo prison in Tarnów. He was captured while crossing the border into Slovakia after the defeat of the Modlin Fortress during the 1939 invasion of Poland by Nazi Germany. Gajowniczek survived the war and afterward became a lay missionary, dedicating his life to spreading the story of Kolbe's sacrifice.

== Biography ==
Franciszek Gajowniczek, a Roman Catholic, was born in Strachomin near Mińsk Mazowiecki. After the reconstitution of sovereign Poland, he moved to Warsaw in 1921, married, and had two sons. He was a professional soldier, a Polish army sergeant, who took part in the defense of Wieluń as well as Warsaw in September 1939 during the 1939 invasion of Poland by Nazi Germany. After the Battle of Modlin Gajowniczek was captured by the Gestapo in Zakopane while crossing the border into Slovakia and sentenced to forced labour in Tarnów.

Gajowniczek was transferred to Auschwitz on 8 October 1940. He and Kolbe met as inmates of Auschwitz in May 1941. When a camp prisoner appeared to have escaped, SS-Hauptsturmführer Karl Fritzsch ordered that ten other prisoners be executed by starvation in reprisal. Gajowniczek (prisoner number 5659) was one of those selected at roll call. When priest Maximilian Kolbe heard Gajowniczek cry out in agony over the fate of his family, he offered himself instead, for which he was later canonized. The switch was permitted. After two weeks, Kolbe (prisoner number 16670) and the three other survivors were put to death by an injection of carbolic acid.

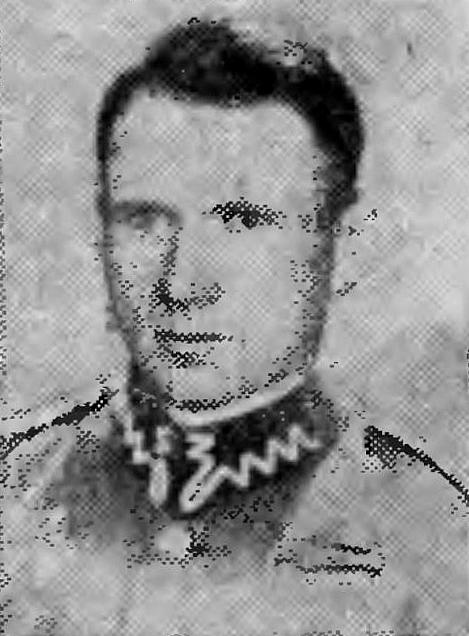
Gajowniczek as a soldier, before 1939

Gajowniczek was transferred from Auschwitz to Sachsenhausen concentration camp on 25 October 1944. He was liberated there by the Allies, after spending five years, five months, and nine days in concentration camps in total. He reunited with his wife Helena, six months later in Rawa Mazowiecka. She survived the war, but their sons were killed in a Soviet bombardment of Rawa Mazowiecka in January 1945 before his release.

=== After World War II ===
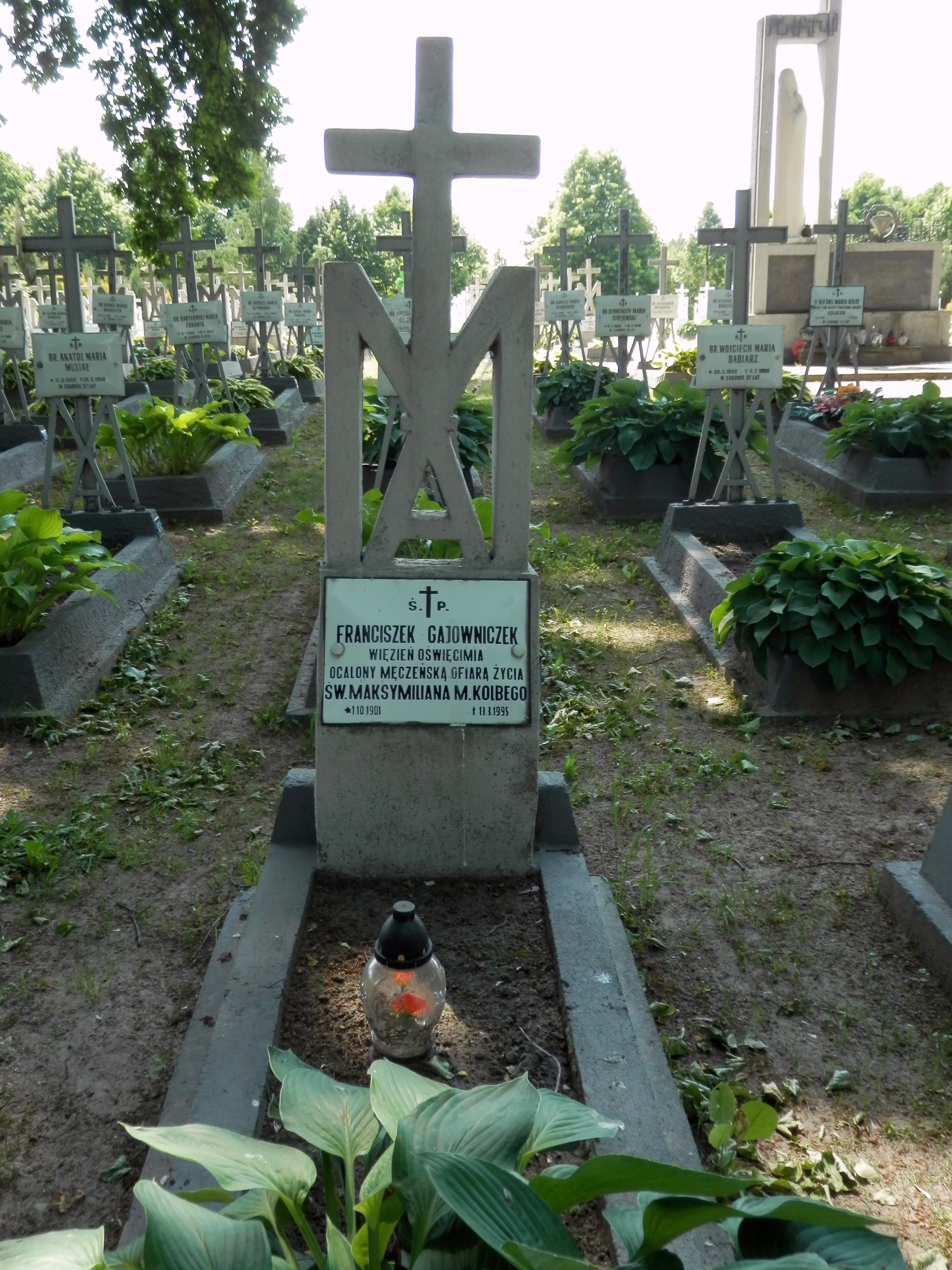
Gajowniczek's grave at the Niepokalanów cemetery, Poland

On 17 October 1971, Gajowniczek was a special guest of Pope Paul VI in the Vatican when Maximilian Kolbe was beatified for his martyrdom. In 1972, Time magazine reported that over 150,000 people made a pilgrimage to Auschwitz to honor the anniversary of Kolbe's beatification. One of the first to speak was Gajowniczek, who declared "I want to express my thanks for the gift of life." His wife, Helena, died in 1977. Gajowniczek was in the Vatican once again, this time as a guest of Pope John Paul II, when Kolbe was canonized on 10 October 1982.

In 1994, Gajowniczek visited St. Maximilian Kolbe Catholic Church of West Chester, Pennsylvania and also in Houston, Texas, where he told his translator Chaplain Thaddeus Horbowy that "so long as he ... has breath in his lungs, he would consider it his duty to tell people about the heroic act of love by Maximilian Kolbe."

Gajowniczek died in the city of Brzeg on 13 March 1995 at the age of 93. He was buried at Niepokalanów, a religious community founded by Maximilian Kolbe, 53 years after Kolbe saved his life. He was survived by his second wife, Janina.
