= Generałowo =

- Village
- Location within Poland
- Coordinates: 51°59′00″N 21°47′00″E
- Country: Poland
- Voivodeship: Masovian
- County: Mińsk
- Gmina: Latowicz
- Population: 80

Generałowo [ɡɛnɛraˈwɔvɔ] is a village in the administrative district of Gmina Latowicz, within Mińsk County, Masovian Voivodeship, in east-central Poland.
