= Battle of Rawa (1863) =

1863 battle

- Part of the January Uprising
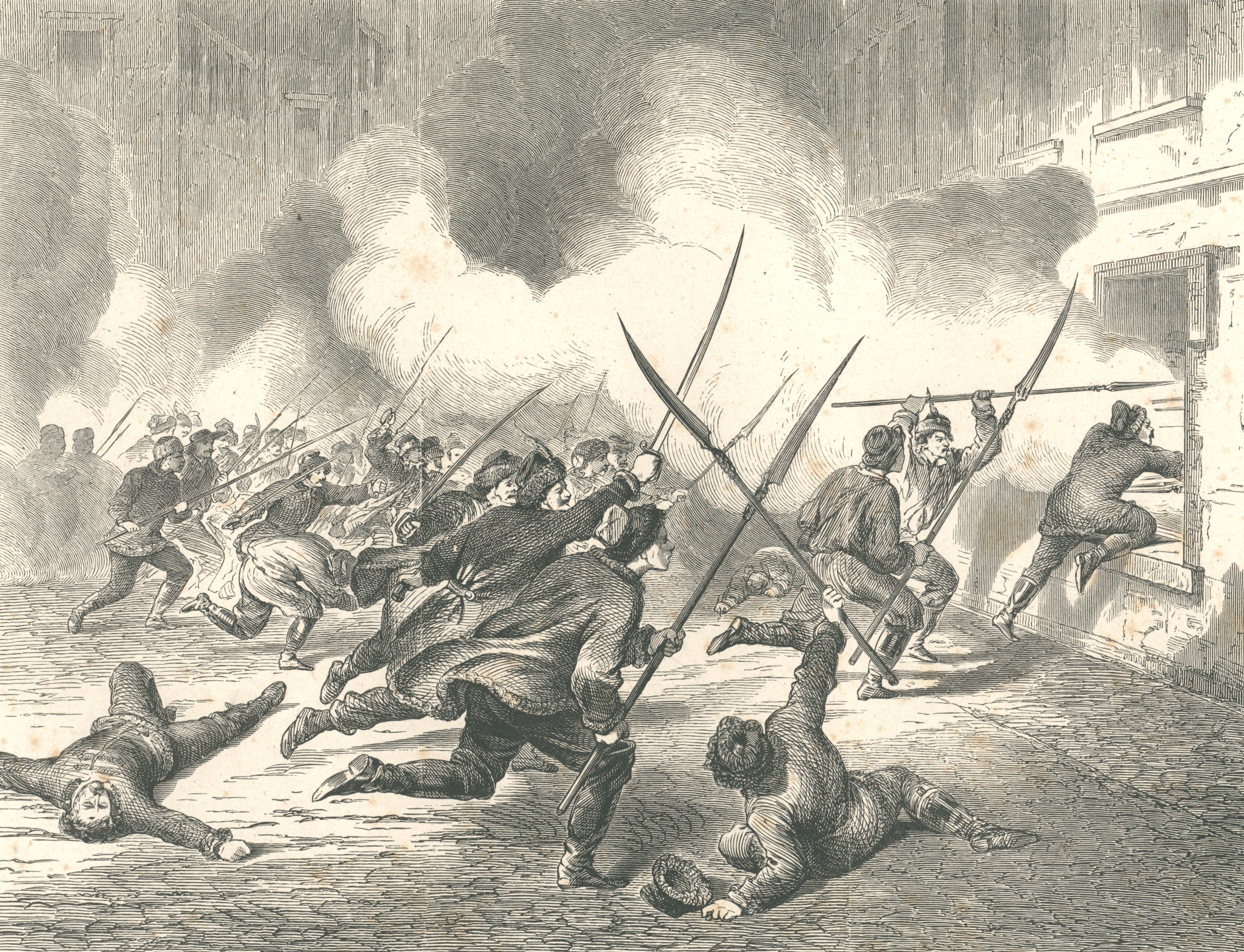
- Battle of Rawa
Date	4 February 1863
Location	Rawa Mazowiecka 51°46′N 20°15′E
Result	Polish victory

Belligerents
(Poland) Polish insurgents	Russian Empire

Commanders and leaders
Antoni Jeziorański; Aleksander Sokołowski; Franciszek Sokołowski	

Strength
374	160

Casualties and losses
6 dead and 11 wounded	

The Battle of Rawa was one of skirmishes of the Polish January Uprising. It took place on 4 February 1863 in the town of Rawa Mazowiecka, Russian-controlled Congress Poland. A unit of Polish insurgents under Antoni Jeziorański, and Aleksander and Franciszek Sokołowski, managed to capture barracks of the Imperial Russian Army. The remaining Russians retreated towards Skierniewice. With several pieces of weaponry and an unknown number of prisoners, the Poles then headed southwards.
