= Wężyczyn =

- Village
- Location within Poland
- Coordinates: 52°4′N 21°49′E
- Country: Poland
- Voivodeship: Masovian
- County: Mińsk
- Gmina: Latowicz
- Population: 212

Wężyczyn [vɛ̃ˈʐɨt͡ʂɨn] is a village in the administrative district of Gmina Latowicz, within Mińsk County, Masovian Voivodeship, in east-central Poland.
