= Gołełąki =

- Village
- Location within Poland
- Coordinates: 52°00′08″N 21°43′28″E
- Country: Poland
- Voivodeship: Masovian
- County: Mińsk
- Gmina: Latowicz
- Population: 116

Gołełąki [ɡɔwɛˈwɔnki] is a small village in the administrative district of Gmina Latowicz, within Mińsk County, Masovian Voivodeship, in east-central Poland.
