= Budziska, Gmina Latowicz =

Budziska
- Village
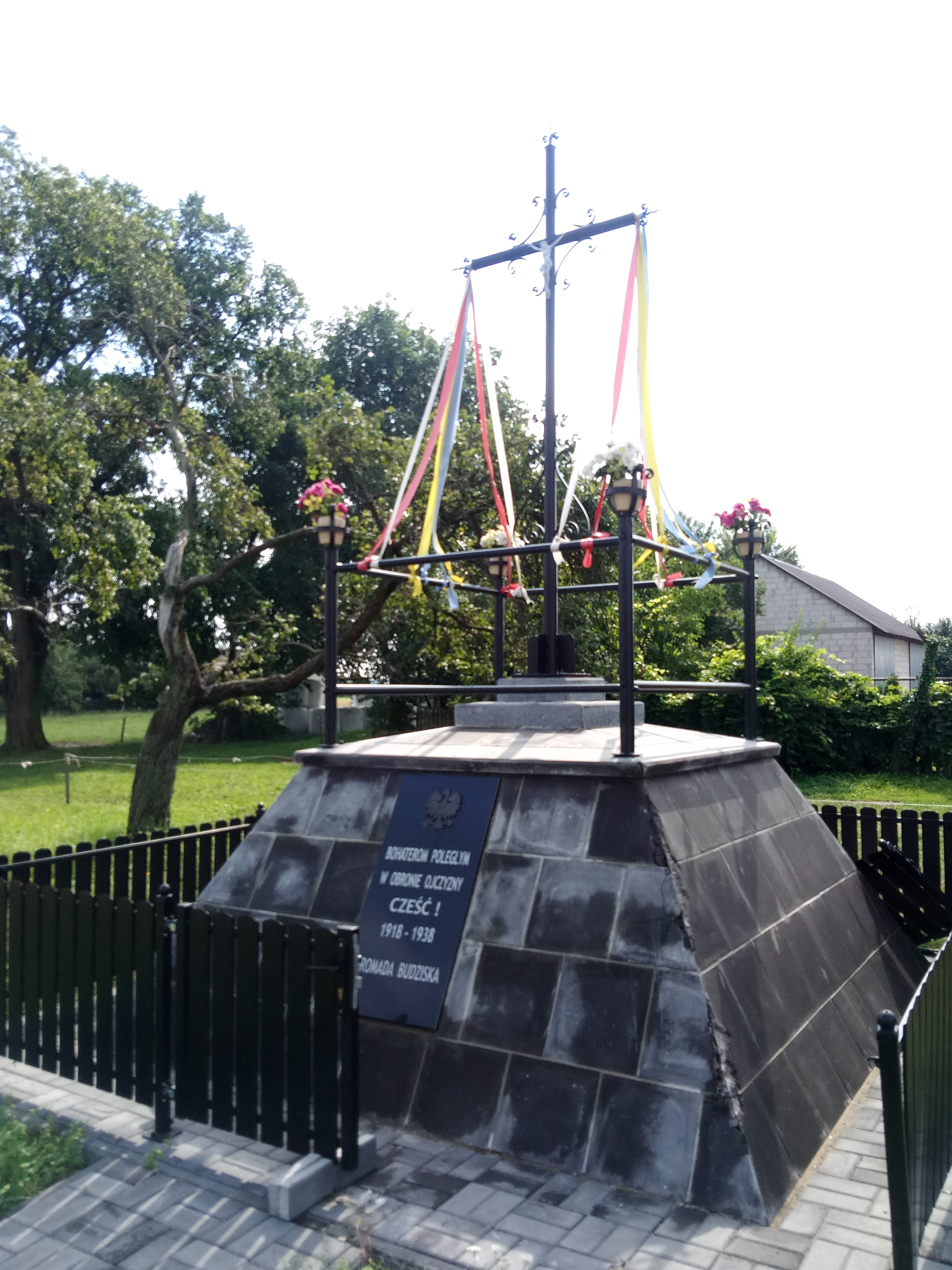

- Location within Poland
- Coordinates: 51°59′4″N 21°46′44″E
- Country: Poland
- Voivodeship: Masovian
- County: Mińsk
- Gmina: Latowicz

Population
  - Total: 156
- Time zone: UTC+1 (CET)
  - Summer (DST): UTC+2 (CEST)

Budziska [buˈd͡ʑiska] is a village in the administrative district of Gmina Latowicz, within Mińsk County, Masovian Voivodeship, in east-central Poland.
