= Kamionka, Gmina Latowicz =

Kamionka
- Village
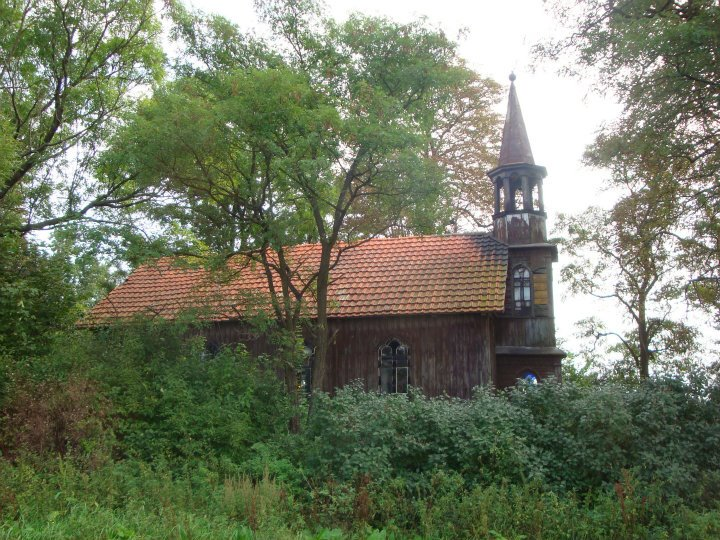
- Old Catholic Mariavite Church in Kamionka

- Location within Poland
- Coordinates: 52°03′25″N 21°45′28″E
- Country: Poland
- Voivodeship: Masovian
- County: Mińsk
- Gmina: Latowicz
- Population: 250

Kamionka [kaˈmjɔnka] is a village in the administrative district of Gmina Latowicz, within Mińsk County, Masovian Voivodeship, in east-central Poland.
