= Gmina Latowicz =

Gmina Latowicz Latowicz Commune
- Gmina
- Coat of arms
- Interactive map of Gmina Latowicz
- Coordinates (Latowicz): 52°1′36″N 21°48′39″E
- Country: Poland
- Voivodeship: Masovian
- County: Mińsk
- Seat: Latowicz

Area
  - Total: 114.15 km^{2} (44.07 sq mi)

Population (2013)
  - Total: 5,478
  - Density: 47.99/km^{2} (124.3/sq mi)

Gmina Latowicz is a rural gmina (administrative district) in Mińsk County, Masovian Voivodeship, in east-central Poland. Its seat is the village of Latowicz, which lies approximately 25 kilometres (16 mi) south-east of Mińsk Mazowiecki and 60 km (37 mi) east of Warsaw.

The gmina covers an area of 114.15 square kilometres (44.1 sq mi), and as of 2006 its total population is 5,559 (5,478 in 2013).

== Villages ==
Gmina Latowicz contains the villages and settlements of Borówek, Budy Wielgoleskie, Budziska, Chyżyny, Dąbrówka, Dębe Małe, Generałowo, Gołełąki, Kamionka, Latowicz, Oleksianka, Redzyńskie, Stawek, Strachomin, Transbór, Waliska, Wężyczyn and Wielgolas.

== Neighbouring gminas ==
Gmina Latowicz is bordered by the gminas of Borowie, Cegłów, Mrozy, Parysów, Siennica and Wodynie.
