= Redzyńskie =

- Village
- Location within Poland
- Coordinates: 51°59′N 21°49′E
- Country: Poland
- Voivodeship: Masovian
- County: Mińsk
- Gmina: Latowicz
- Population: 225

Redzyńskie [rɛˈd͡zɨɲskʲɛ] is a village in the administrative district of Gmina Latowicz, within Mińsk County, Masovian Voivodeship, in east-central Poland.
