= Rycerz Niepokalanej =

Polish Roman-Catholic magazine

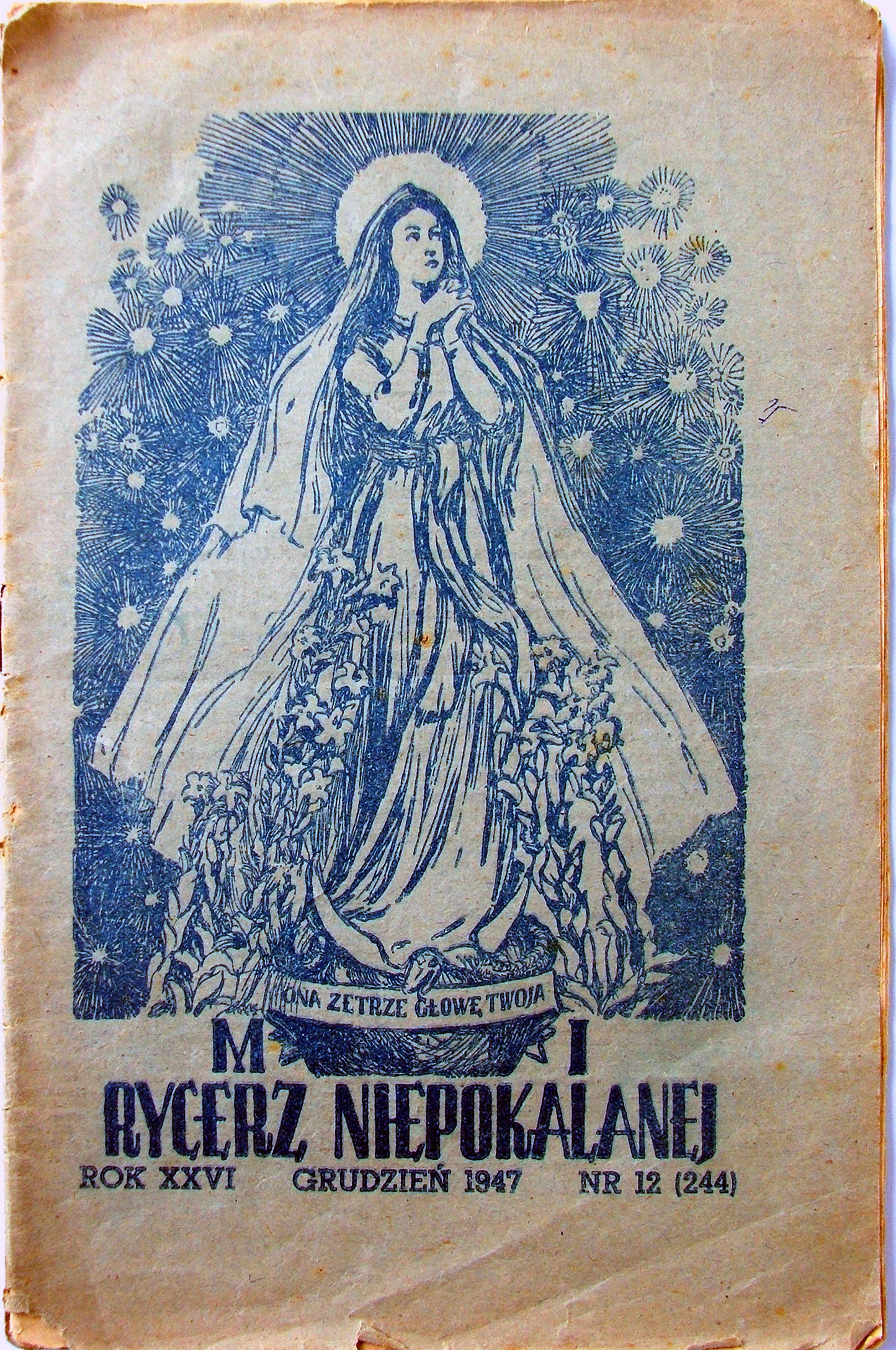
- Frequency: Monthly
- Founder: Maximilian Kolbe
- Founded: January 1922
- Country: Poland
- Language: Polish
- Website: rycerzniepokalanej.pl

Rycerz Niepokalanej (English: Knight of The Immaculate) is a Polish Roman-Catholic monthly magazine. It was first published in January 1922, and in Communist Poland its publication was banned from 1952 until 1981. Its founder and first editor-in-chief was Father Maximilian Kolbe, who remained in this post until March 1939.

Rycerz Niepokalanej was first published in Kraków. In October 1922, its main office was moved to Grodno, and in 1927, to Niepokalanow. Its original circulation was 5,000. By 1927, it grew to 70,000 copies a month, and in 1939, before German Invasion of Poland, the circulation was 800,000. The magazine was not published during World War II; only one issue came out in December 1940, with permission of German authorities. Rycerz Niepokalanej returned after the war, but was closed again in 1952. It has been published in Niepokalanow since 1981.

It was also published in Japanese, under the title Seibo no Kishi. Its first copy came out in 1930 by the efforts of Father Kolbe, who frequently visited Japan. Seibo no Kishi was the first Catholic magazine in Japan.

== Sources ==
- franciszkanie.pl - serwis informacyjny
