= Latowicz =

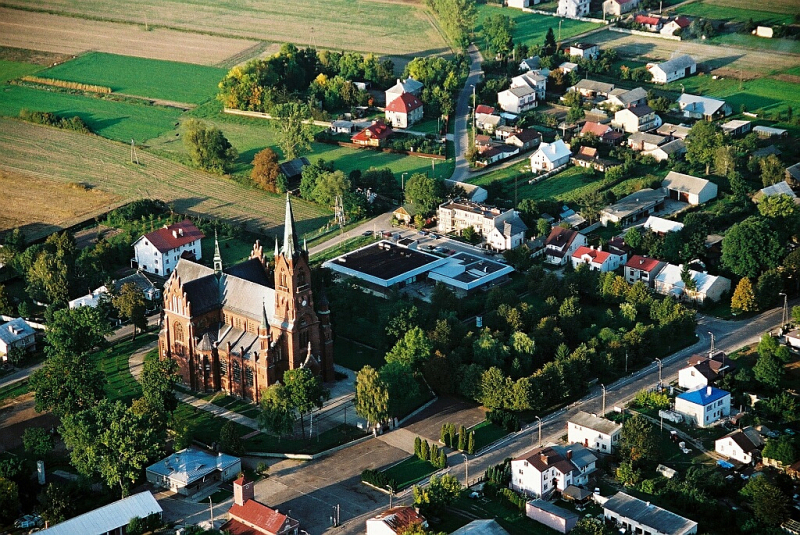
- Aerial view of Latowicz

- Coat of arms

- Location within Poland
- Coordinates: 52°1′36″N 21°48′39″E
- Country: Poland
- Voivodeship: Masovian
- County: Mińsk
- Gmina: Latowicz
- Town rights: 1423

Population
  - Total: 1,429
- Time zone: UTC+1 (CET)
  - Summer (DST): UTC+2 (CEST)
- Postal code: 05-334
- Vehicle registration: WM

Latowicz [laˈtɔvit͡ʂ] is a town in Mińsk County, Masovian Voivodeship, in east-central Poland. It is the seat of the gmina (administrative district) called Gmina Latowicz.

The town has a population of 1,429.

== History ==
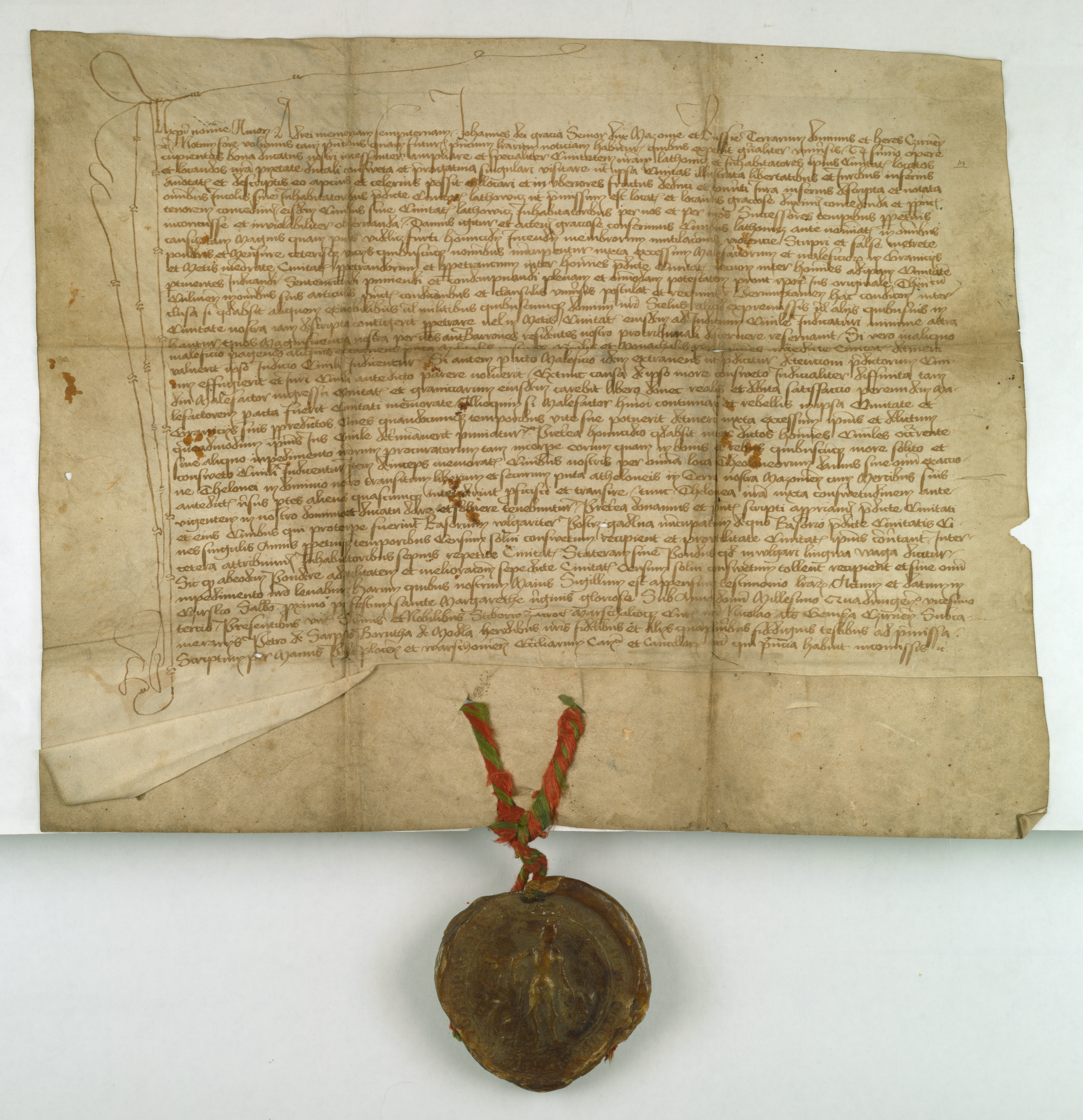
Act granting various rights to Latowicz by Duke Janusz I the Old in 1423

The parish church in Latowicz was founded in 1400. Town rights were granted in 1423 by Duke Janusz I the Old. It was a royal town, administratively located in the Garwolin County in the Masovian Voivodeship in the Greater Poland Province of the Kingdom of Poland.

Following the German-Soviet invasion of Poland, which started World War II in September 1939, Latowicz was occupied by Germany until 1944.

== Notable people ==
- Maria Michał Kowalski (1871–1942), Polish religious leader, founder of the Catholic Mariavite Church
