= Borówek, Gmina Latowicz =

Borówek
- Village
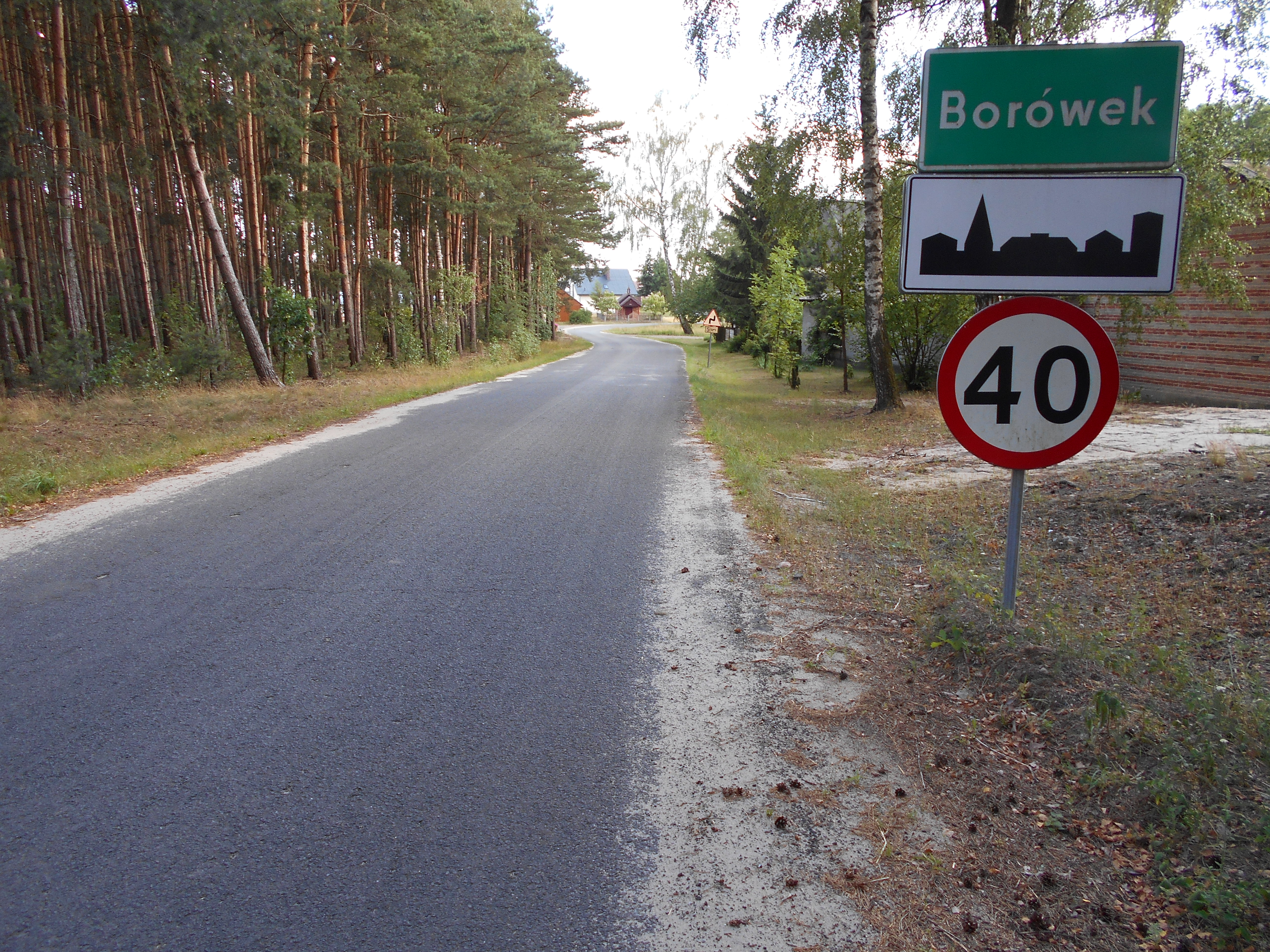

- Location within Poland
- Coordinates: 52°1′46″N 21°40′15″E
- Country: Poland
- Voivodeship: Masovian
- County: Mińsk
- Gmina: Latowicz
- Population: 59

Borówek [bɔˈruvɛk] is a village in the administrative district of Gmina Latowicz, within Mińsk County, Masovian Voivodeship, in east-central Poland.
