= Transbór =

- Village
- Location within Poland
- Coordinates: 52°1′N 21°42′E
- Country: Poland
- Voivodeship: Masovian
- County: Mińsk
- Gmina: Latowicz
- Population: 397

Transbór [ˈtransbur] is a village in the administrative district of Gmina Latowicz, within Mińsk County, Masovian Voivodeship, in east-central Poland.
