= Dębe Małe, Mińsk County =

Dębe Małe
- Village
- Location within Poland
- Coordinates: 52°1′N 21°45′E
- Country: Poland
- Voivodeship: Masovian
- County: Mińsk
- Gmina: Latowicz
- Population: 248

Dębe Małe [ˈdɛmbɛ ˈmawɛ] is a village in the administrative district of Gmina Latowicz, within Mińsk County, Masovian Voivodeship, in east-central Poland.

== Name ==
Until the mid-twentieth century, the village was known as Dambe, Dembe, or Dumbe, which refers to a wooded area. The forests in the area are dominated by oaks, a tree venerated since pagan times, hence the name from deby meaning oaks. The second part of the name "małe" or "small" was added later, when geographers realized that there were two villages (thence called Dembe-Małe and Dęmbe-Wielkie) with the same name in the Masovian Voivodeship. However, in 1953 Dembe-Wielkie (aka Dęby or Demby) was closed down.
