= Karl Fritzsch =

SS officer in Nazi Germany (1903–c. 1945)

- Born: 10 July 1903; Nassengrub, Bohemia, Austria-Hungary
- Disappeared: disappeared May 2, 1945 (aged 41)
- Children: 3
- Military career
- Allegiance: Nazi Germany
- Branch: Schutzstaffel
- Service years: Dachau 1934–1939; Auschwitz 1940–1941; Flossenbürg 1942–1943
- Rank: SS-Hauptsturmführer
- Unit: SS-Totenkopfverbände
- Commands: Schutzhaftlagerführer Auschwitz Camp Deputy
- Other work: First suggested and experimented with using Zyklon B gas for the purpose of mass murder

Karl Fritzsch (10 July 1903 – disappeared 2 May 1945) was a German SS official who served as deputy and acting commandant at the Auschwitz concentration camp from 1940 to 1941. He is best known as the official responsible for the death of priest Maximilian Kolbe and, according to Rudolf Höss, first suggesting using poisonous gas Zyklon B and experimenting with gas chambers for the purpose of mass murder at Auschwitz. Fritzsch served at a number of Nazi concentration camps until 1944 when he was implicated in a corruption scandal and dismissed from his positions. Fritzsch was sent to front line duty and is believed to have died at the Battle of Berlin on 2 May 1945, but this is unconfirmed, and his fate is unknown.

== Early life ==
Karl Fritzsch was born on 10 July 1903 in Nassengrub in Bohemia in Austria-Hungary (present-day Mokřiny, Czech Republic) into a Bohemian German family. His father was a stove builder and moved constantly on work assignments, so Fritzsch never received formal education. For some years, he worked as a sailor for First Danube Steamship Company, which operated riverboats on the Danube. Fritzsch's marriage in 1928 to Franziska Stich produced three children but ended in divorce in 1942.

== Political career ==
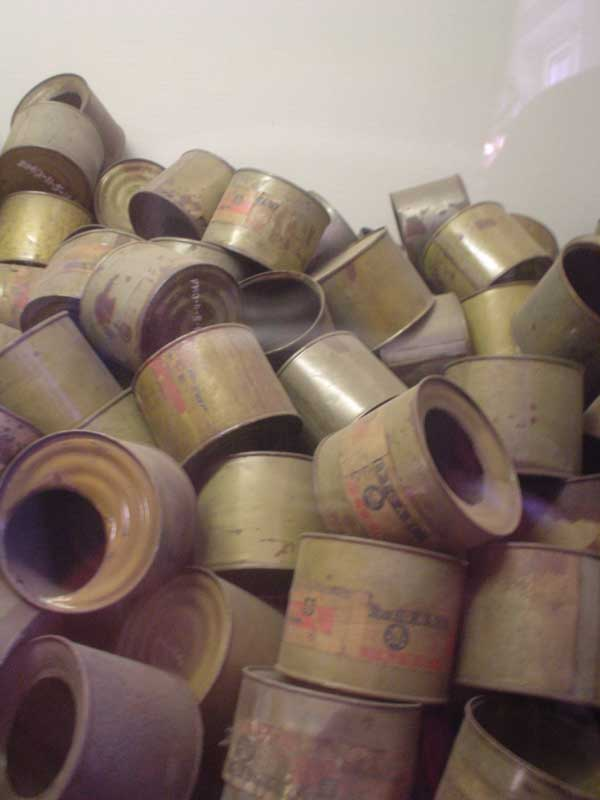
Empty poison gas canisters found by the Soviet Army in Auschwitz-Birkenau at the end of World War II

In July 1930, at the age of 27, Fritzsch joined the Nazi Party (membership number 261,135) and its paramilitary wing the Schutzstaffel (SS) (membership number 7287). He became a career SS man and acquired a position at the Dachau concentration camp in 1934, almost as soon as it opened, as a member of the 1st SS-Totenkopf Regiment "Upper Bavaria". By September 1939, Fritzsch had moved into the commandant's office at Dachau and headed the postal censorship office there.

=== Auschwitz ===
In May 1940, due to his camp experience, Fritzsch became deputy to Rudolf Höss and head of the economic operation (Schutzhaftlagerführer) of Auschwitz. Fritzsch quickly obtained a fearsome reputation in Auschwitz, selecting prisoners to die of starvation in reprisal for escape attempts. Together with Höss, he was responsible for the torture death of victims locked inside standing cells in the basement of the Bunker, i.e. the Block 11, or 13 prison, until they died. Fritzsch addressed the first 758 inmates of the camp, brought in June 1940, with the following words: "You came here not to a sanatorium, but to a German concentration camp, from which there is no other way out but through the chimney. If someone doesn't like it, they can go straight to the wires. If there are Jews in the transport, they have the right to live no longer than two weeks, priests a month, the rest three months." Another time he said: "For us, all of you are not human, but a pile of dung (...). For such enemies of the Third Reich as you, the Germans will have no favor and no mercy. We will be delighted to drive you all through the grates of the crematorium furnaces. Forget your wives, children and families, here you all savor like dogs."

On 29 July 1941, when a headcount found that three prisoners were missing, Fritzsch sentenced 10 remaining prisoners to immurement. One of the condemned, Franciszek Gajowniczek, was reprieved when a fellow prisoner, Franciscan priest Maximilian Kolbe, offered to take his place. After over two weeks of starvation, only Kolbe and three others remained alive. They were killed in the underground bunker by lethal injection. Kolbe was later canonized by Pope John Paul II for his actions.

Fritzsch was also fond of psychological torture. Former Auschwitz prisoner Karol Świętorzecki recalled the first Christmas Eve behind the camp barbed wire, in 1940, was also one of the most tragic. "The Nazis set up a Christmas tree, with electric lights, on the roll-call square. Beneath it, they placed the bodies of prisoners who had died while working or frozen to death at roll call. Lagerführer Karl Fritzsch referred to the corpses beneath the tree as 'a present' for the living, and forbade the singing of Polish Christmas carols."

According to testimony of Höss, it was also Fritzsch who came up with the idea of using Zyklon B for the purpose of mass murder at Auschwitz. While Höss was on an official trip in late August 1941, Fritzsch ordered the killing of Soviet prisoners of war by being locked in cells in the basement of the Bunker. Fritzsch tested Zyklon B inside the cells, which were not air-tight, subjecting the victims to even more torturous death. He repeated the tests on additional victims in the presence of Höss. According to Höss, the preferred method for the mass murders in Auschwitz using Zyklon B was devised on site.

On 15 January 1942, Fritzsch was transferred to Flossenbürg as Schutzhaftlagerführer, and from early August until October 1942 he was temporary substitute commandant of the camp.

== Disappearance ==
By 1944, Fritzsch had been arrested as part of an internal SS investigation into corruption among the leadership at several Nazi concentration camps. An SS court charged him with murder and, as punishment, he was transferred to front-line duty in the SS-Panzergrenadier Ersatzbatallion 18. It is commonly believed that Fritzsch was killed in action in the Battle for Berlin on 2 May 1945, a week before German surrender, but his final fate had long remained unknown. Soviet sources claimed that MI6 caught Fritzsch in Norway. In his 2007 memoirs, For He Is an Englishman, Memoirs of a Prussian Nobleman, Captain Charles Arnold-Baker recorded that as an MI6 officer in Oslo, he arrested Fritzsch: "We picked up, for example, the deputy commandant of Auschwitz, a little runt of a man called Fritzsch whom we naturally put in the custody of a Jewish guard – with strict instructions not to damage him, of course."

On 4 May 2015, Dutch journalist Wierd Duk published an article on his investigation of Fritzsch's disappearance. In it he cites a report from 1966 by the Central Office of the State Justice Administrations for the Investigation of National Socialist Crimes in which Berlin inhabitant Gertrud Berendes claims that Fritzsch had shot himself on 2 May 1945 in the basement of a house at Sächsische Strasse 42 in Berlin. She mentioned that her father and a neighbour had buried Fritzsch in the Preußenpark and she had sent his personal belongings to his wife. In a separate report from 1966 by the Kriminalpolizei Regensburg, Fritzsch's wife states that she had no reason to doubt her husband's death and that she had received his wedding ring and personal letters. However, Duk's book De Beul en de Heilige on Fritzsch that was supposed to be launched first at the end of 2015 and then in 2016 at publisher Prometheus, was postponed indefinitely and has since been removed from the publishers' list of forthcoming books.

== Bibliography ==
- Staatliches Museum Auschwitz-Birkenau (Hrsg.): Auschwitz in den Augen der SS. Oświęcim 1998, ISBN 83-85047-35-2
- Ernst Klee: Das Personenlexikon zum Dritten Reich: Wer war was vor und nach 1945. Fischer-Taschenbuch-Verlag, Frankfurt am Main 2005, ISBN 3-596-16048-0
- Hermann Langbein: Menschen in Auschwitz. Frankfurt am Main, Berlin Wien, Ullstein-Verlag, 1980, ISBN 3-548-33014-2
- Jens-Christian Wagner: Produktion des Todes: Das KZ Mittelbau-Dora, Wallstein Verlag, Göttingen 2001, ISBN 3-89244-439-0.
- Wacław Długoborski, Franciszek Piper (Hrsg.): Auschwitz 1940–1945. Studien zur Geschichte des Konzentrations- und Vernichtungslagers Auschwitz., Verlag Staatliches Museum Auschwitz-Birkenau, Oswiecim 1999, 5 Bände: I. Aufbau und Struktur des Lagers. II. Die Häftlinge – Existentzbedingungen, Arbeit und Tod. III. Vernichtung. IV. Widerstand. V. Epilog., ISBN 83-85047-76-X.
