= Maximilian Kolbe =

Polish Franciscan friar and saint (1894–1941)

Saint Maximilian Kolbe OFM Conv
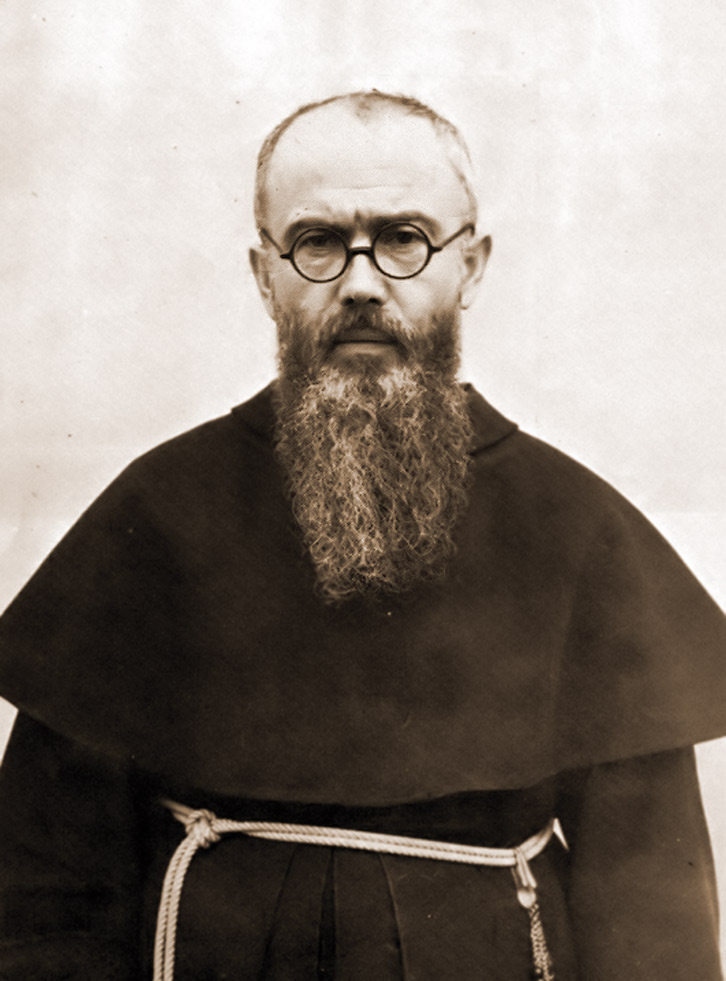
- Kolbe in 1936

Martyr
- Born: Raymund Kolbe; 8 January 1894; Zduńska Wola, Congress Poland, Russian Empire
- Died: 14 August 1941 (aged 47); Auschwitz-Birkenau, Nazi Germany
- Venerated in: Catholic Church; Palmarian Church; Anglican Communion; Lutheran Church
- Beatified: 17 October 1971, Saint Peter's Square, Vatican City by Pope Paul VI
- Canonized: 10 October 1982, Saint Peter's Square by Pope John Paul II
- Major shrine: Basilica of the Omni-mediatress of All Glories
- Feast: 14 August
- Attributes: Religious habit of a Friar Minor Conventual; the Rycerz Niepokalanej; Nazi concentration prison uniform; Nazi concentration camp badge; crucifix; rosary
- Patronage: prisoners, drug addicts, families, journalists, amateur radio operators, pro-life movement, people with eating disorders

Maximilian Maria Kolbe, OFM Conv (born Raymund Kolbe; Polish: Maksymilian Maria Kolbe; (Note: Pronounced [maksɨˌmʲilʲan ˌmarʲja ˈkɔlbɛ].) 8 January 1894 – 14 August 1941) was a Polish Conventual Franciscan friar, priest, missionary, and martyr. He volunteered to die in place of a man named Franciszek Gajowniczek in the German death camp of Auschwitz, located in German-occupied Poland during World War II. He had been active in promoting the veneration of the Immaculate Virgin Mary, founding and supervising the monastery of Niepokalanów near Warsaw, operating an amateur-radio station (SP3RN), and founding or running several other organizations and publications.

On 10 October 1982, Pope John Paul II canonized Kolbe and declared him a martyr of charity. The Catholic Church venerates him as the patron saint of amateur radio operators, drug addicts, political prisoners, families, journalists, and prisoners. John Paul II declared him "the patron of our difficult century". His feast day is 14 August, the day of his martyrdom. Due to Kolbe's efforts to promote consecration and entrustment to Mary, he is known as an "apostle of consecration to Mary".

== Early life ==
Raymund Kolbe was born on 8 January 1894 in Zduńska Wola, in the Kingdom of Poland, then a puppet state of the Russian Empire. He was the second son of weaver Julius Kolbe and midwife Maria Dąbrowska. His father was an ethnic German, and his mother was Polish. Raymund had four brothers, two of whom died of tuberculosis. Shortly after his birth, his family moved to Pabianice in Poland. In 1903, when he was age nine, Kolbe experienced a vision of the Virgin Mary. He later described this incident:

That night I asked the Mother of God what was to become of me. Then she came to me holding two crowns, one white, the other red. She asked me if I was willing to accept either of these crowns. The white one meant that I should persevere in purity and the red that I should become a martyr. I said that I would accept them both.

== Franciscan friar ==
In 1907, Kolbe and his elder brother Francis joined the Order of Friars Minor Conventual, known as the Conventual Franciscans. They enrolled at the Conventual Franciscan minor seminary in Lwów, in present-day Ukraine, later that year. In 1910, the Franciscans allowed Raymund Kolbe to enter the novitiate, where he chose a religious name, Maximilian. He professed his first vows to the order in 1911, and his final vows in 1914, adopting the additional name of Maria (Mary).

=== World War I ===
The Franciscans sent Kolbe to Rome in 1912 to attend the Pontifical Gregorian University. While he was studying at the Gregorian, World War I broke out in 1914. The next year, Kolbe's father, Julius, joined the Polish Legions, a unit in the Austro-Hungarian Army led by Józef Piłsudski. Julius was captured later that year by the Imperial Russian Army and was hanged as a traitor. The news of his father's execution traumatized Kolbe.

Kolbe earned a Doctor of Philosophy from the Gregorian in 1915. Kolbe then continued his studies at the Pontifical University of St. Bonaventure in Rome, where he earned a doctorate in theology in either 1919 or 1922. During this period, he became active in the consecration and entrustment to Mary. While in Rome, Kolbe witnessed vehement demonstrations by Freemasons against Pope Pius X and later Pope Benedict XV. According to Kolbe:

They placed the black standard of the "Giordano Brunisti" under the windows of the Vatican. On this standard the archangel, Michael, was depicted lying under the feet of the triumphant Lucifer. At the same time, countless pamphlets were distributed to the people in which the Holy Father (i.e., the Pope) was attacked shamefully.

To counter these demonstrations, Kolbe started the Militia Immaculatae (Army of the Immaculate One) on 16 October 1917. This was a group of Catholics who prayed for the conversion of sinners and enemies of the Catholic Church, specifically the Freemasons, through the intercession of the Virgin Mary. So serious was Kolbe about this goal that he added a line to the Miraculous Medal prayer:

O Mary, conceived without sin, pray for us who have recourse to thee. And for all those who do not have recourse to thee; especially the Freemasons and all those recommended to thee.

During this period, Kolbe proposed that the entire Franciscan order be consecrated to the Immaculate by an additional vow. The idea was well received, but faced the hurdles of approval by the hierarchy of the order and the lawyers and was never adopted.

== Priesthood ==
In 1918, Kolbe was ordained a priest. In July 1919, after the end of World War I, he returned to Poland to teach at the Kraków Seminary. The Second Polish Republic had won its independence from the Russian Republic in 1918. While in Kraków, Kolbe was active in promoting the veneration of the Immaculate Virgin Mary. He was strongly opposed to socialist and communist movements that had surfaced in Poland after the war.

In 1922, a recurrence of tuberculosis forced Kolbe to leave the seminary. In January 1922, Kolbe founded the monthly periodical Rycerz Niepokalanej (Knight of the Immaculata), a devotional publication based on the French Le Messager du Coeur de Jesus (Messenger of the Heart of Jesus). From 1922 to 1926, he operated a religious publishing press in Grodno in present-day Belarus. As his activities grew in scope, in 1927 he founded a new Conventual Franciscan monastery at Niepokalanów near Warsaw. It became a major religious publishing centre. A junior seminary was opened there two years later.

=== Missionary work in Asia ===
During the 1920s, Kolbe encountered a group of Japanese Catholics studying in Poland. They lamented the lack of Catholic missionaries in Japan, prompting Kolbe to consider making a missionary trip to East Asia. Kolbe arrived in 1930 in Shanghai, then part of the Republic of China. However, his mission failed to gather a following there, prompting him to move to Japan. Kolbe soon acquired a basic literacy in Japanese. In 1931, Kolbe founded a Franciscan monastery, Mugenzai no Sono (無原罪の園, transl. Garden of the Immaculata), (Note: After the friars learned that mugenzai was a homonym for "endless sin", the monastery's name was changed to Seibo no Kishi (transl. Knights of the Blessed Mother).) outside Nagasaki. The monastery soon began publishing a Japanese edition of the Knight of the Immaculata. In mid-1932, Kolbe left Japan for Malabar, then part of British India, where he founded another monastery.

=== Return to Poland ===
Meanwhile, in his absence the monastery at Niepokalanów began to publish a daily newspaper Mały Dziennik (the Small Diary), in alliance with the political group National Radical Camp (Obóz Narodowo Radykalny). This publication reached a circulation of 137,000, and nearly double that, 225,000, on weekends. Kolbe returned to Poland in 1933 for a general chapter of the order in Kraków. Kolbe returned to Japan and remained there until called back to attend the Provincial Chapter in Poland in 1936. There he was appointed guardian of Niepokalanów, thus precluding his return to Japan. In 1938, he started a radio station at Niepokalanów, Radio Niepokalanów. He held an amateur radio license, with the call sign SP3RN.

== World War II ==
The invasion of Poland on 1 September 1939 by the German Army signaled the start of World War II. Kolbe was one of the few priests who remained in the monastery, where he organized a temporary hospital. After the Germans captured Niepokalanów, they arrested Kolbe on 19 September 1939. While in custody, Kolbe refused to sign the Deutsche Volksliste (German People's List). Doing so would have given him rights similar to those of German citizens in exchange for recognizing his ethnic German ancestry. The Germans released him on 8 December 1939.

Upon his release, he continued work at his friary where he and other friars provided shelter to refugees from Greater Poland, including 2,000 Jews whom he hid from Nazi persecution in the Niepokalanów friary. Kolbe received permission to continue publishing religious works, though significantly reduced in scope. The monastery continued to act as a publishing house, issuing a number of publications considered anti-Nazi.

=== Imprisonment and death ===
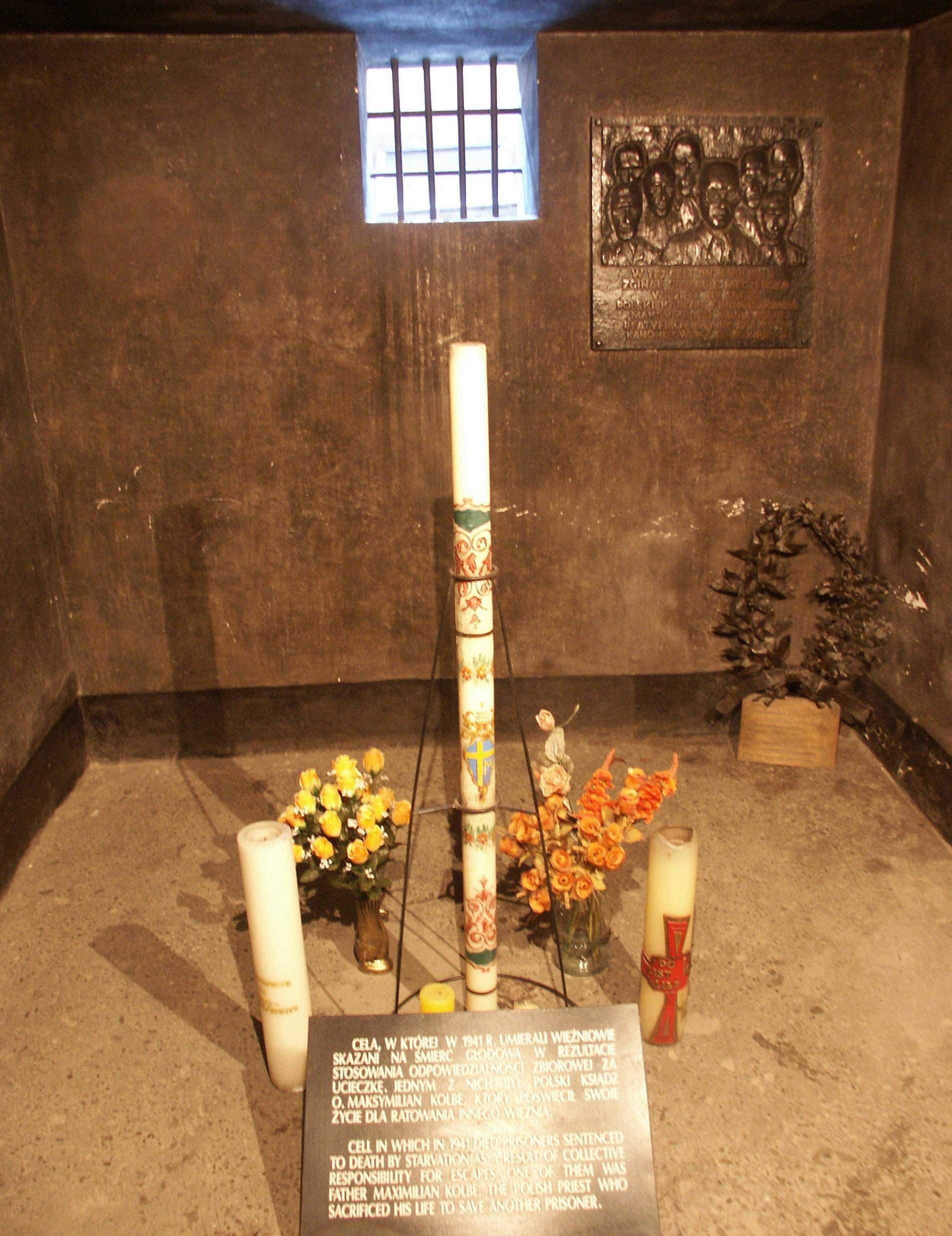
Maximilian Kolbe's prison cell in Block 11, Auschwitz concentration camp

On 17 February 1941, the Gestapo shut down the monastery and arrested Kolbe along with four others. He was incarcerated in the Pawiak prison in Warsaw. On 28 May 1941, the Germans transferred Kolbe to the Auschwitz concentration camp as prisoner 16670.

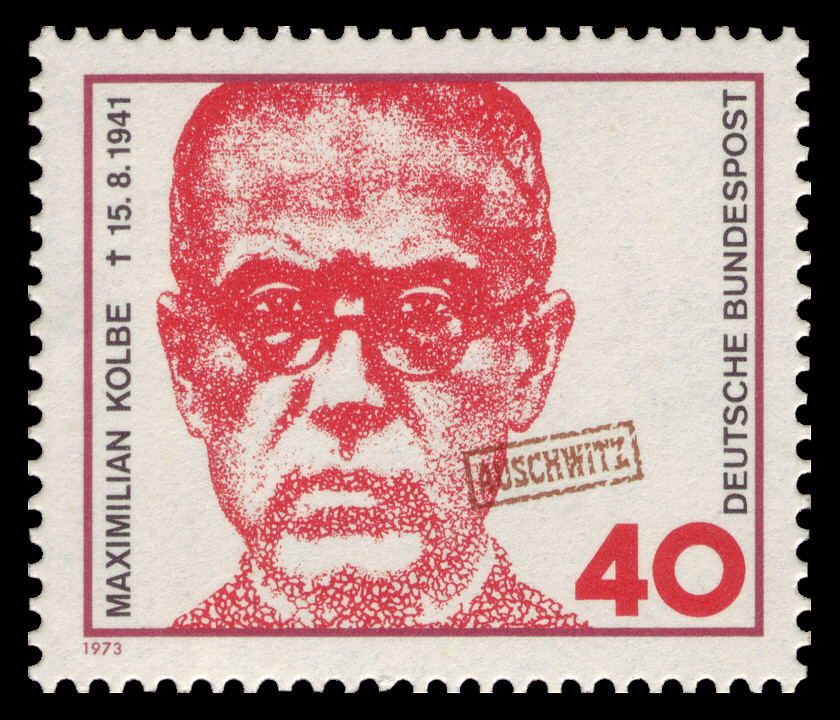
Kolbe, on a West German postage stamp, marked Auschwitz

Arriving at Auschwitz, Kolbe started ministering to his fellow prisoners. He was subjected to violent harassment by the guards, including beatings and lashings. On one occasion, sympathetic inmates smuggled the wounded Kolbe to a prisoner hospital. At the end of July 1941, a prisoner successfully escaped from Auschwitz. In reprisal, the deputy camp commander, SS-Hauptsturmführer Karl Fritzsch, ordered guards to pick ten men to be starved to death in an underground bunker. When selected, Franciszek Gajowniczek, a Polish Catholic, cried out, "My wife! My children!" At that moment, Kolbe volunteered to take his place.

An assistant janitor later testified that Kolbe led the prisoners in prayer from his prison cell. Each time the guards checked on him, he was standing or kneeling in the middle of the cell, calmly looking at those who entered. After the group had been starved and deprived of water for two weeks, only Kolbe and three others remained alive. Impatient to empty the bunker, the guards gave the four remaining prisoners lethal injections of carbolic acid. Kolbe is said to have raised his left arm and calmly waited for it. Kolbe died on 14 August 1941. He was cremated on 15 August, which happened to be the feast day of the Assumption of Mary.

== Canonization ==
The cause for Kolbe's beatification was opened at a local level on 3 June 1952. On 12 May 1955, Kolbe was recognized by Pope Pius XII as a servant of God. Kolbe was declared venerable by Pope Paul VI on 30 January 1969 and beatified as a confessor of the faith by the same pope in 1971. The miracles used to confirm Kolbe's beatification were the July 1948 cure of intestinal tuberculosis in Angela Testoni and the August 1950 cure of calcification of the arterial sclerosis of Francis Ranier. Both individuals attributed their cures to Kolbe's intercession by their prayers to him.

Kolbe was canonized by Pope John Paul II on 10 October 1982. The pope declared him as a confessor and a martyr of charity. Franciszek Gajowniczek, the man Kolbe saved at Auschwitz, survived the Holocaust and was present as a guest at both the beatification and the canonization ceremonies.

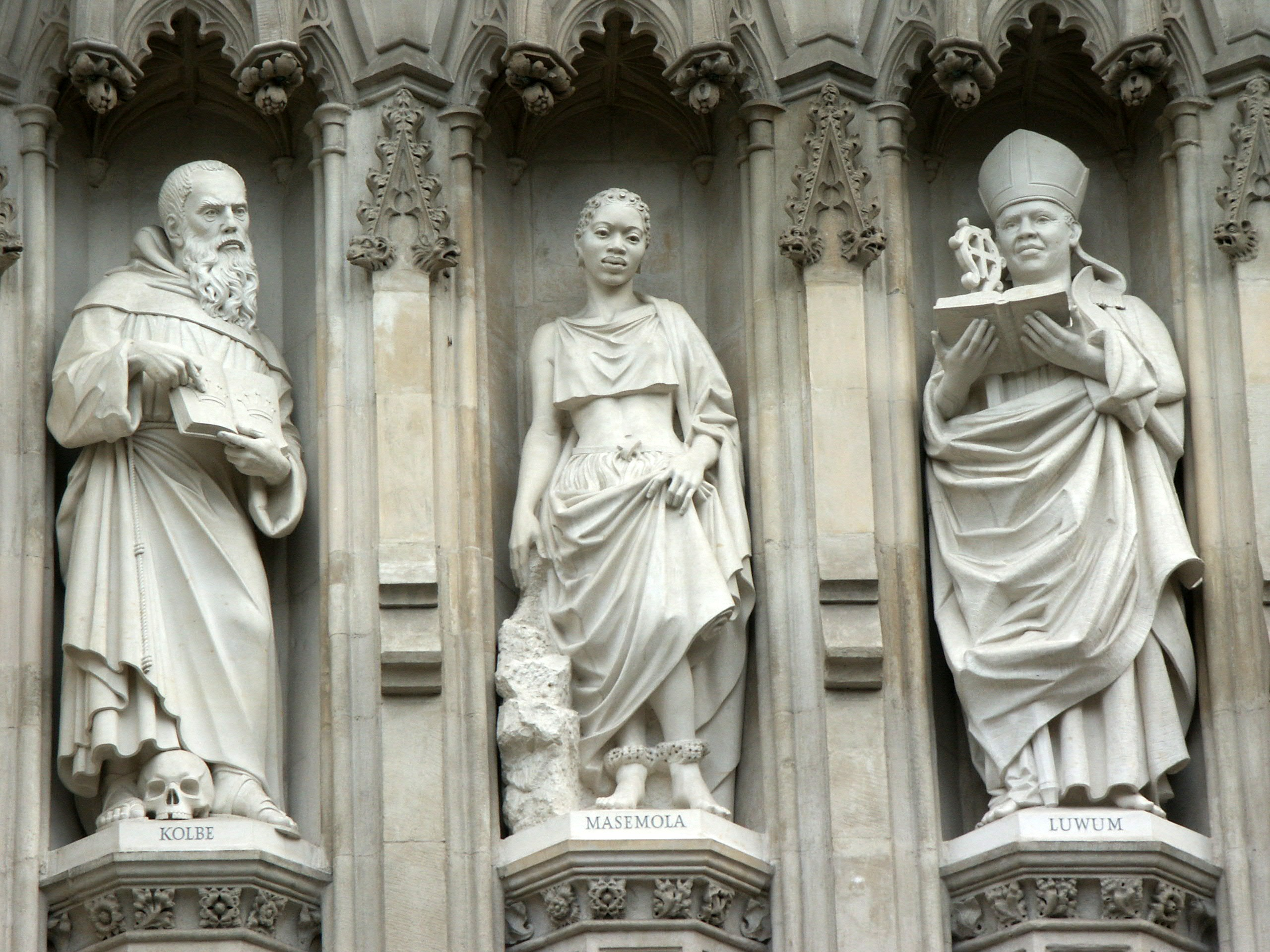
The statue of Kolbe (left) above the Great West Door of Westminster Abbey

The feast of Saint Maximilian Kolbe was added to the General Roman Calendar. He is one of 10 20th-century martyrs depicted in statues above the Great West Door of the Anglican Westminster Abbey in London. Kolbe is remembered in the Calendar of saints of the Church of England with a commemoration on 14 August.

=== Controversies ===
Kolbe's recognition as a martyr generated some controversy within the Catholic Church. While his self-sacrifice at Auschwitz was considered saintly and heroic, he was not killed as a result of odium fidei ("hatred of the faith"), but as the result of his act of charity toward another man. Pope Paul VI recognized this distinction at Kolbe's beatification, naming him a confessor and a "martyr of charity". John Paul II, however, overruled the commission he had established (which agreed with the earlier assessment of heroic charity). John Paul II wanted to make the point that the Nazis' systematic hatred of whole categories of humanity was inherently also a hatred of religious (Christian) faith; he said that Kolbe's death equated to earlier examples of religious martyrdom.

==== Accusations of antisemitism ====
Kolbe's alleged antisemitism was a source of controversy in the 1980s in the aftermath of his canonization. In 1926, in the first issue of the monthly Knight of the Immaculate, Kolbe said he considered Freemasons "as an organized clique of fanatical Jews, who want to destroy the church." In a 1924 column, he cited the Protocols of the Elders of Zion as an "important proof" that "the founders of Zionism intended, in fact, the subjugation of the entire world", but that "not even all Jews know this". In a calendar that the publishing house of his organization, the Militia of the Immaculate, published in an edition of a million in 1939, Kolbe wrote,

Atheistic Communism seems to rage ever more wildly. Its origin can easily be located in that criminal mafia that calls itself Freemasonry, and the hand that is guiding all that toward a clear goal is international Zionism. Which should not be taken to mean that even among Jews one cannot find good people.

In his periodicals, Kolbe published articles about topics such as a Zionist plot for world domination. Slovenian philosopher Slavoj Žižek criticized Kolbe's activities as "writing and organizing mass propaganda for the Catholic Church, with a clear anti-Semitic and anti-Masonic edge." In contrast, a writer for online EWTN stated that the "Jewish question played a very minor role in Kolbe's thought and work" and that "only thirty-one out of over 14,000 of his letters reference the Jewish people or Judaism, and most express a missionary zeal and concern for their spiritual welfare".

According to the anti-racist "Never Again" Association:

In 1938, in 'Maly Dziennik', Kolbe argued, 'Jewry has harmed and continues to harm us all the time, it is eating into the body of the nation like a cancer.

During World War II, Kolbe's monastery at Niepokalanów sheltered Jewish refugees. According to the testimony of a local, "When Jews came to me asking for a piece of bread, I asked Father Maximilian if I could give it to them in good conscience, and he answered me, 'Yes, it is necessary to do this because all men are our brothers.'"

=== Relics ===
First-class relics of Kolbe exist, in the form of hairs from his head and beard, preserved without his knowledge by two friars at Niepokalanów who served as barbers in his friary between 1930 and 1941. Since his beatification in 1971, more than 1,000 such relics have been distributed around the world for public veneration. Second-class relics, such as his personal effects, clothing and liturgical vestments, are preserved in his monastery cell and in a chapel at Niepokalanów, where they may be venerated by visitors.

== Influence ==
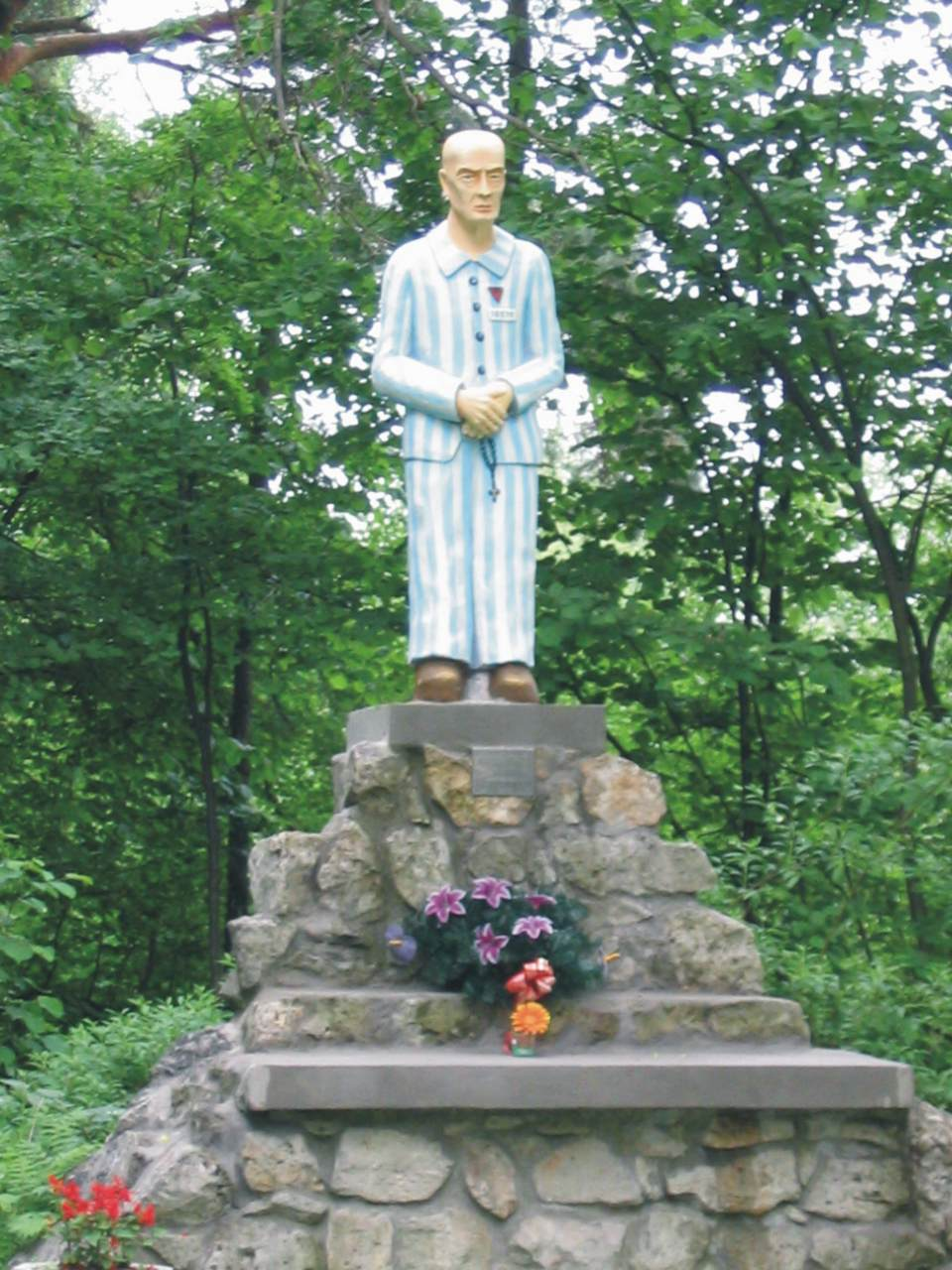
The first monument to Maximilian Kolbe in Poland in Chrzanów

Kolbe influenced his own community of the Franciscan Friars of Mary Immaculate, as the Militia Immaculatae movement had continued. In recent years, new religious and secular institutes have been founded, inspired by this spiritual way. Among these are the Missionaries of the Immaculate Mary – Fr. Kolbe, the Franciscan Friars of Mary Immaculate, and a parallel congregation of religious sisters and others. The Franciscan Friars of Mary Immaculate are taught basic Polish so they can sing the traditional hymns Kolbe sang in his native tongue. According to the friars:

Our patron, St. Maximilian Kolbe, inspires us with his unique Mariology and apostolic mission, which is to bring all souls to the Sacred Heart of Christ through the Immaculate Heart of Mary, Christ's most pure, efficient, and holy instrument of evangelization – especially those most estranged from the Church.

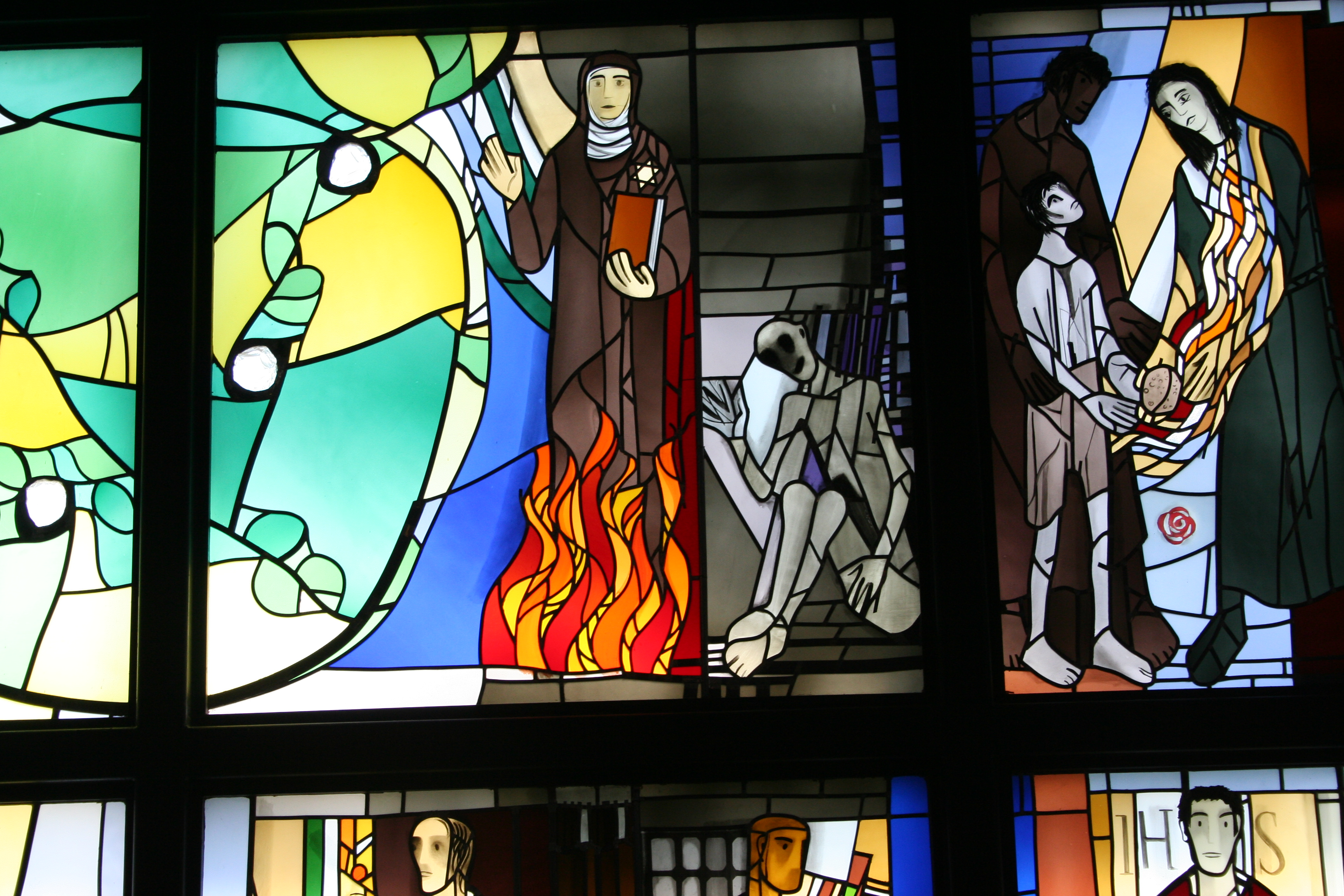
Stained-glass window by Alois Plum depicting Edith Stein and Maximilian Kolbe

Kolbe's views into Marian theology echo today through their influence on Vatican II. His image may be found in churches across Europe and throughout the world. Several churches in Poland are under his patronage, such as the Sanctuary of Saint Maxymilian in Zduńska Wola and the Church of Saint Maxymilian Kolbe in Szczecin. A museum, Museum of St. Maximilian Kolbe "There was a Man", was opened in Niepokalanów in 1998.

In 1963, Rolf Hochhuth published The Deputy, a play influenced by Kolbe's life, and dedicated to him. In 2000, the National Conference of Catholic Bishops (US) designated Marytown in Libertyville, Illinois home to a community of Conventual Franciscan friars, as the National Shrine of St. Maximilian Kolbe. In 1991, Krzysztof Zanussi released a biographical Polish film about Kolbe, Life for Life: Maximilian Kolbe, with Edward Żentara as Kolbe. The Polish Senate declared 2011 to be the year of Kolbe.

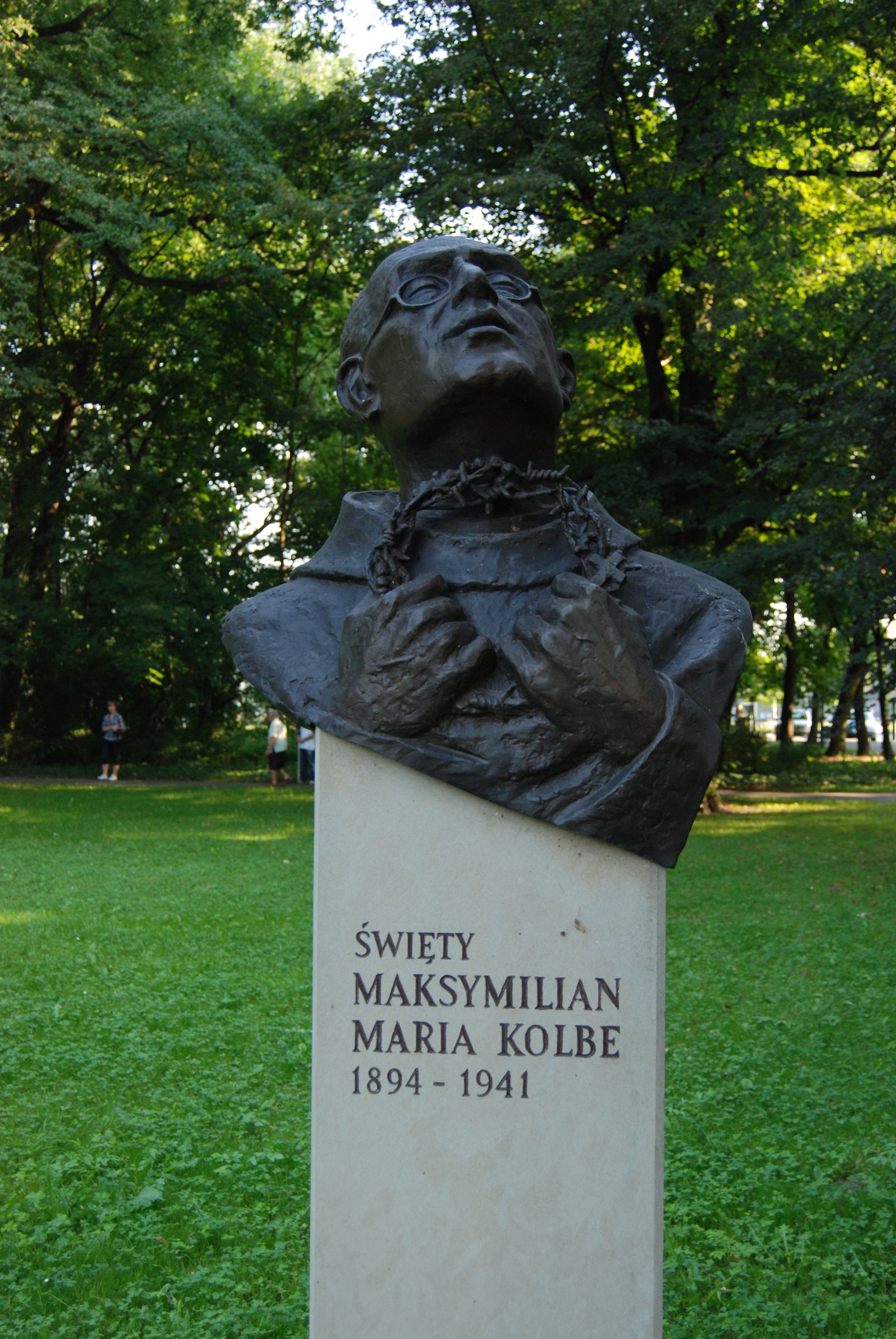
Bust of Kolbe in Henryk Jordan Park in Kraków

In 2023, the Mexican production company Dos Corazones Films released the animated feature film Max, which recounts part of Kolbe's life. The 2025 film Triumph of the Heart tells the story of Kolbe's final weeks in the Block 11 starvation chamber. The film was written and directed by Anthony D'Ambrosio and stars Marcin Kwasny.

== Immaculata prayer ==
Kolbe composed the Immaculata prayer as a prayer of consecration to the Immaculata.

== See also ==
- Holocaust theology
- Nazi persecution of the Catholic Church in Poland
- Maximilian of Tebessa
- Peter Fehlner
- Sisters Minor of Mary Immaculate
- Élise Rivet
