= Immaculata prayer =

Traditional Catholic Marian prayer

The Immaculata prayer is a Traditional Catholic Marian prayer composed by Saint Maximillian Kolbe.

It is a prayer of consecration to the Immaculata, i.e. the immaculately conceived Virgin Mary.

The consecration prayer is as follows:

O Immaculata, Queen of Heaven and earth, refuge of sinners and our most loving Mother, God has willed to entrust the entire order of mercy to you. I, (name), a repentant sinner, cast myself at your feet, humbly imploring you to take me with all that I am and have, wholly to yourself as your possession and property. Please make of me, of all my powers of soul and body, of my whole life, death and eternity, whatever most pleases you.

If it pleases you, use all that I am and have without reserve, wholly to accomplish what was said of you: "She will crush your head," and "You alone have destroyed all heresies in the whole world." Let me be a fit instrument in your immaculate and merciful hands for introducing and increasing your glory to the maximum in all the many strayed and indifferent souls, and thus help extend as far as possible the blessed kingdom of the most Sacred Heart of Jesus. For wherever you enter you obtain the grace of conversion and growth in holiness, since it is through your hands that all graces come to us from the most Sacred Heart of Jesus.

℣. Allow me to praise you, O Sacred Virgin

℟. Give me strength against your enemies

Amen

A shorter version of the prayer can be used for the daily renewal of the consecration:

Immaculata, Queen and Mother of the Church, I renew my consecration to you for this day and for always, so that you might use me for the coming of the Kingdom of Jesus in the whole world. To this end I offer you all my prayers, actions and sacrifices of this day.

== Bibliography ==
- University of Dayton Marian prayers
- Consecration.com
- Women for Faith and Family
