= Wielgolas, Mińsk County =

Wielgolas
- Village
- Location within Poland
- Coordinates: 52°1′57″N 21°43′44″E
- Country: Poland
- Voivodeship: Masovian
- County: Mińsk
- Gmina: Latowicz
- Population: 650

Wielgolas [vjɛlˈɡɔlas] is a village in the administrative district of Gmina Latowicz, within Mińsk County, Masovian Voivodeship, in east-central Poland.
