= Militia Immaculatae =

Catholic Association of the faithful

- Type: Association of the faithful
- Established: October 16, 1917
- Religious affiliation: Catholic Church
- Founder: St. Maximilian Kolbe, OFM Conv.
- Post-nominals: MI
- Website: https://militiaoftheimmaculata.com/

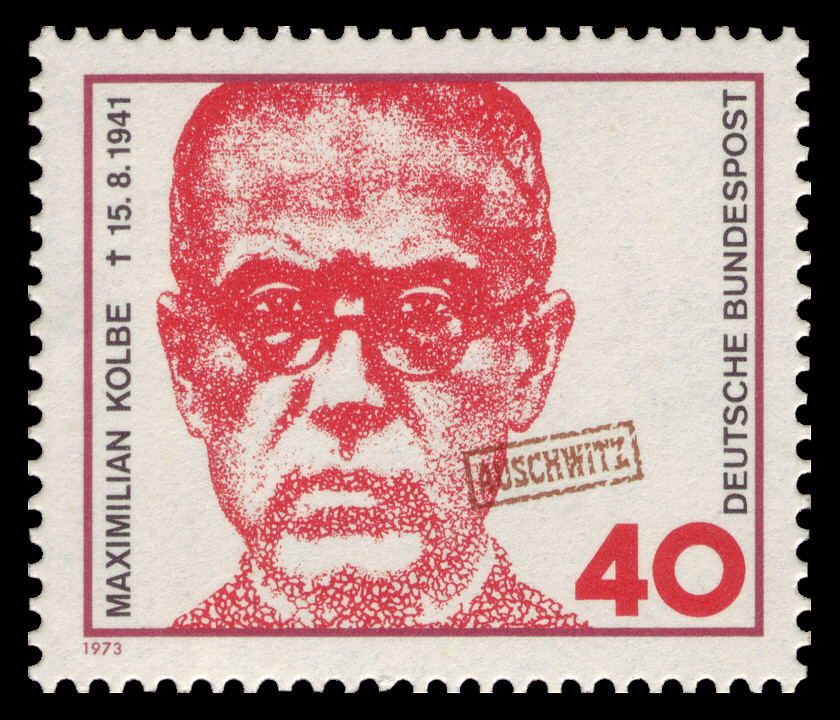
Maximilian Kolbe commemorated on a West German stamp from 1973. Issued by Deutsche Bundespost

The Militia Immaculatae (meaning the "Army of the Immaculate One"), called in English the Knights of the Immaculata, is a worldwide Catholic evangelization movement founded by St. Maximilian Kolbe in 1917.

== History ==
The Militia of the Immaculata (or MI) was founded in Rome at the St. Bonaventure Pontifical Theological Faculty (now the International College of the Conventual Franciscans) by a Conventual Franciscan, Saint Maximilian Kolbe. Kolbe presented the idea of forming the MI to his Jesuit spiritual director, as well as to his Franciscan Superior at the house of studies in Rome, and was encouraged to proceed. The MI is open to all Catholics and encourages intercession to the Virgin Mary for the conversion of sinners and enemies of the Catholic Church through the intercession of the Virgin Mary.

It was established as a pious union on January 2, 1922, by the Vicariate of Rome.

Joining the MI involves making a personal act of consecration to Mary. Members wear the Miraculous Medal as an outward sign of their consecration.

The purpose of the Knights is contained in these words: to do all you can for the conversion of sinners, heretics, schismatics and so on. - Fr. Maximilian Kolbe, 1938.

The association grew and spread to different countries. On October 16, 1997, the Pontifical Council for the Laity decreed the "Milizia dell'Immacolata" to be an international association of the faithful of pontifical right. MI claims to have over 3 million members in 48 countries.

The organization publishes Miles Immaculatae, a six-monthly magazine of Marian culture and Kolbian formation. Founded by St. Maximilian Kolbe, specifically for priests and pastoral workers, it is now the official publication of the International Center.

== See also ==
- Immaculate Conception
- Immaculata prayer
- Niepokalanów
- Catholic Marian movements and societies

== Bibliography ==
- Smith, Jeremiah J., Saint Maximilian Kolbe: Knight of the Immaculata, 2008 ISBN 0-89555-619-7
- Manteau-Bonamy, H. M., Immaculate Conception and the Holy Spirit: The Marian Teachings of St. Maximilian Kolbe, 2008 ISBN 978-0913382004
