= Niepokalanów =

Polish monastery

Niepokalanów Monastery
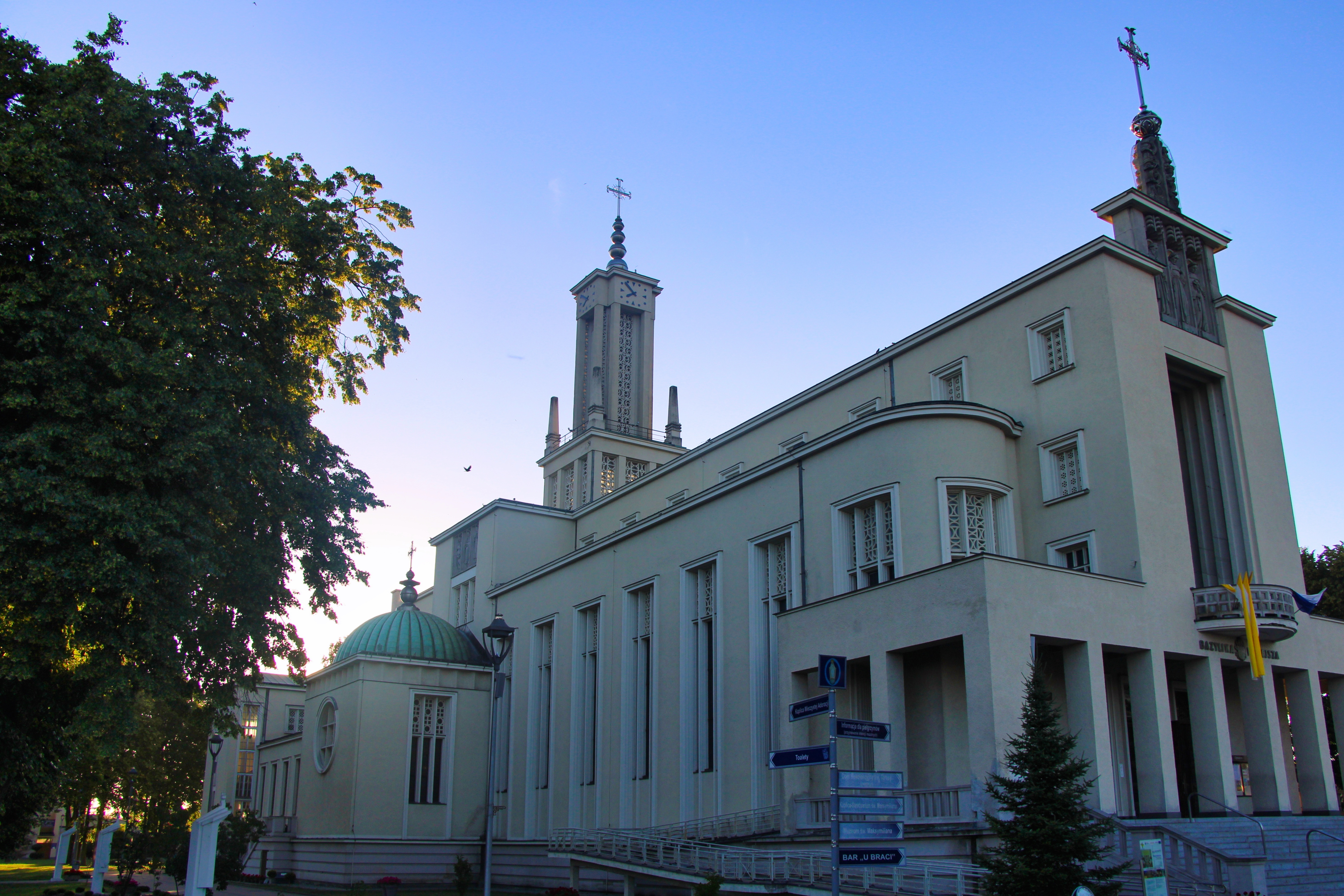
- South-east side of the Basilica of St Mary Immaculate in summer time

- Location within Poland

Monastery information
- Order: Friars Minor Conventual
- Established: August 1927
- Diocese: Archdiocese of Warsaw

People
- Founder: Maximilian Kolbe

Site
- Location: Paprotnia, Poland
- Coordinates: 52°12′13.5″N 20°25′14″E

Niepokalanów Monastery (also called City of the Immaculate Mother of God) is a Conventual Franciscan friary in Paprotnia, Poland. It was founded in 1927 by Maximilian Kolbe, who was later canonized as a martyr of the Catholic Church.

== History of the foundation ==
In summer 1927 duke Jan Drucki-Lubecki, the owner of a large estate located in Teresin village, offered fr. Maximilian Kolbe a convenient ground near Warsaw for building a new monastery, later called Niepokalanów. In a letter from October 1927 to the Superior of the Franciscans in Warsaw, the donor of the land described his decision in the following words: I hereby propose to the Reverend Fathers the indefinite use of five morgs of arable land from my estate 'Teresin' (Sochaczew district). This area is situated by the county road leading from Warsaw to Szymanów, opposite the 'Szymanów' station of the Kalisz railway line.

In autumn of the same year the first three barracks (including the first wooden chapel) were built and a consecration of the new monastery took place on 7 December 1927. The facility served as a home for the first group of conventual friars, a publishing house and a minor seminary. In 1930 father Kolbe founded a similar community in Nagasaki (Japan), called Mugenzai no Sono (無原罪の園: Garden of the Immaculate). Quick growth of the Niepokalanów required more and more space. The donator, duke Jan Drucki-Lubecki, allowed the friars to use as much field as necessary, so the area of the monastery reached 28 ha.

Before the Second World War broke out, it was the largest monastery in the world, housing as many as 760 men. In December 1938, one million copies of The Knight of the Immaculate (in Polish: Rycerz Niepokalanej) were printed. Of these, 800,000 were distributed through monthly subscriptions, while 200,000 were allocated for promotional purposes. The whole publishing house used about 1600 tonnes of paper annually for about 60 million copies of papers.

Since July 1931, a volunteer fire department composed of monks has been operating in the monastery. This department, equipped with some basic tools such as hand pumps, a homemade water tanker, ladders and hooks, was responsible for ensuring fire safety for the monastery's wooden residential and publishing buildings, as well as paper storage areas. In the case of a fire, they also promptly assisted local residents. In 1940, the Franciscan firefighters refurbished a Minerva car, adapting it for firefighting purposes, and used it for the following several years. Alongside the publishing activities, which were the main task of Niepokalanów, the Franciscans also developed pastoral care at a wooden chapel built in 1927. Due to considerable distance from the parish church in Pawłowice, a possibility of participating in services or receiving confession at the Franciscans' chapel provided great convenience for the local population. Although the parish center was not established until June 1950, already in November 1927, archbishop Aleksander Kakowski of Warsaw granted permission to celebrate services in the local chapel dedicated to the Immaculate Conception of the BVM.

Shortly before the war, there came an idea of evangelisation through the radio programmes. In December 1938, first test broadcast was aired from the newly established SP3-RN radio (Stacja Polska 3 – Radio Niepokalanów), which operated with a low-power transmitter on shortwave frequencies. The radio building constructed for this purpose, was one of the most modern on the monastery grounds in the pre-war time. The Franciscan radio's activities did not progress beyond a few test broadcasts, as efforts to obtain a formal license for regular broadcasting were halted by the outbreak of the war.

== Second World War ==
During the Second World War, the monastery provided shelter for many soldiers, injured in the September Campaign of 1939 and also for war refugees, regardless of their nationality or religion. For example, at the turn of 1939/1940, a group of approximately 1500 Jews, displaced from Greater Poland, stayed in Niepokalanów for several months, and the friars provided them with care.

The war did not spare the inhabitants of the monastery itself. Father Maximilian Kolbe, together with four other friars, was arrested by the Gestapo and he was murdered in Auschwitz concentration camp in August 1941 when he chose to sacrifice his life so another prisoner could live. That time the media evangelisation was forbidden (with the only one exception – December 1940 issue of Rycerz Niepokalanej, which aroused the hope of surviving dark time of war).

The Franciscans tried to keep up common prayers and help for the prisoners and numerous refugees. There was a sawmill, carpentry and dairy, a repair shop for agricultural machinery, bicycles, scooters, watches and many other items. The friars grew their own food, they had livestock, bee hives and chickens. Every day the local bakery provided fresh bread to many people in need. The courses of secret teaching were also held and PCK (Polish Red Cross) circle functioned.

During the Warsaw Uprising, the monastery became a refuge for the wounded members of Polish resistance, homeless families, and war orphans. Providing food for all that people was a big logistical challenge under the conditions of the occupation. In the end of the war (January 1945) during heavy bombardment of Niepokalanów, six friars were killed, some others injured and many of the buildings of the monastery were destroyed. In total, about 50 friars lost their lives during the entire war.

== Communist era ==
After the war the printing house in Niepokalanów was reopened. The Knight of the Immaculate was issued again, as also some books, dedicated to St Maximilian (e.g. Dwie Korony [Two Crowns] by Gustaw Morcinek). In 1948-1954 there was built a new church in the modernist style according to the design of the architect Zygmunt Gawlik from Cracow. In June 1950, by the decree of cardinal Stefan Wyszynski, a new parish in Niepokalanów was established (7500 faithful circa).

In 1980, by decree of the Holy See, the church in Niepokalanów received the title and privileges of a minor basilica. The church and the monastery were visited by pope John Paul II during his second Pastoral Visit in Poland, on 18 of June 1983. The visit of the pope made Niepokalanów famous not only in Poland, but also abroad. John Paul II called the monastery a heroic place where saint Maximilian lived and the environment of the Immaculate.

== Modern Niepokalanów ==
Today the monastery is an important pilgrimage center in this part of Poland. Every year, on the way to Jasna Góra, the Warsaw Metropolitan Academic Pilgrimage makes a stop in Niepokalanów. The monastery is a popular destination for many local pilgrimages, each made with specific personal intentions (penitential pilgrimages, for the nation's sobriety and so on). Many pilgrims have been able to visit this historic place, to pray in the local basilica, to see a museum, dedicated to St Maximilian (called There was a Man) or another museum – a collection of the volunteer fire department, which is housed on the upper floor of the fire station building.

There also exist two worth to visit chapels in Niepokalanów. The first is a wooden old chapel, one of the first and most important buildings in the monastery. Constructed in autumn 1927, it was later rebuilt and expanded. For almost 40 years after the war (starting from 1957), the chapel served as a "Room of Remembrances", documenting the life, work, and martyrdom of father Maximilian, as well as Franciscan missionary activities on various continents. In December 1997, after a two-year comprehensive renovation, the chapel was reopened to the public. Visiting the chapel, the pilgrims have the opportunity to see what the beginnings of this large publishing monastery founded by St. Maximilian looked like.

The second one is a new chapel of perpetual adoration – "Star of the Immaculate" (in Polish: Gwiazda Niepokalanej). Located in the southern wing of the basilica, the room previously served as a so-called "backup sacristy." It was opened to the public in September 2018, marking the 79th anniversary of the outbreak of World War II. The design for the adoration chapel was prepared in a studio of artists from Gdańsk. Nowadays, the chapel, one of 12 centers worldwide dedicated to prayer for peace, offers the visitors an opportunity for personal prayer and reflection around the clock.

In 1995 Radio Niepokalanów was reactivated. It is the oldest Catholic radio station in Poland that still broadcasts.

== See also ==
- Basilica of the Omni-mediatress of All Glories – history and architecture of basilica minor in Niepokalanów
- Museum of St. Maximilian Kolbe "There was a Man" – museum dedicated to St Maximilian Kolbe, evangelisation activity of Niepokalanów and Franciscan missions
- Biography of Maximilian Kolbe – the life and the activity of St Maximilian Kolbe, founder of Niepokalanów monastery
- Militia Immaculatae – worldwide catholic association of the faithful, founded by St. Maximilian (Knights of the Immaculata)
