= Jan Paweł Łuszczewski =

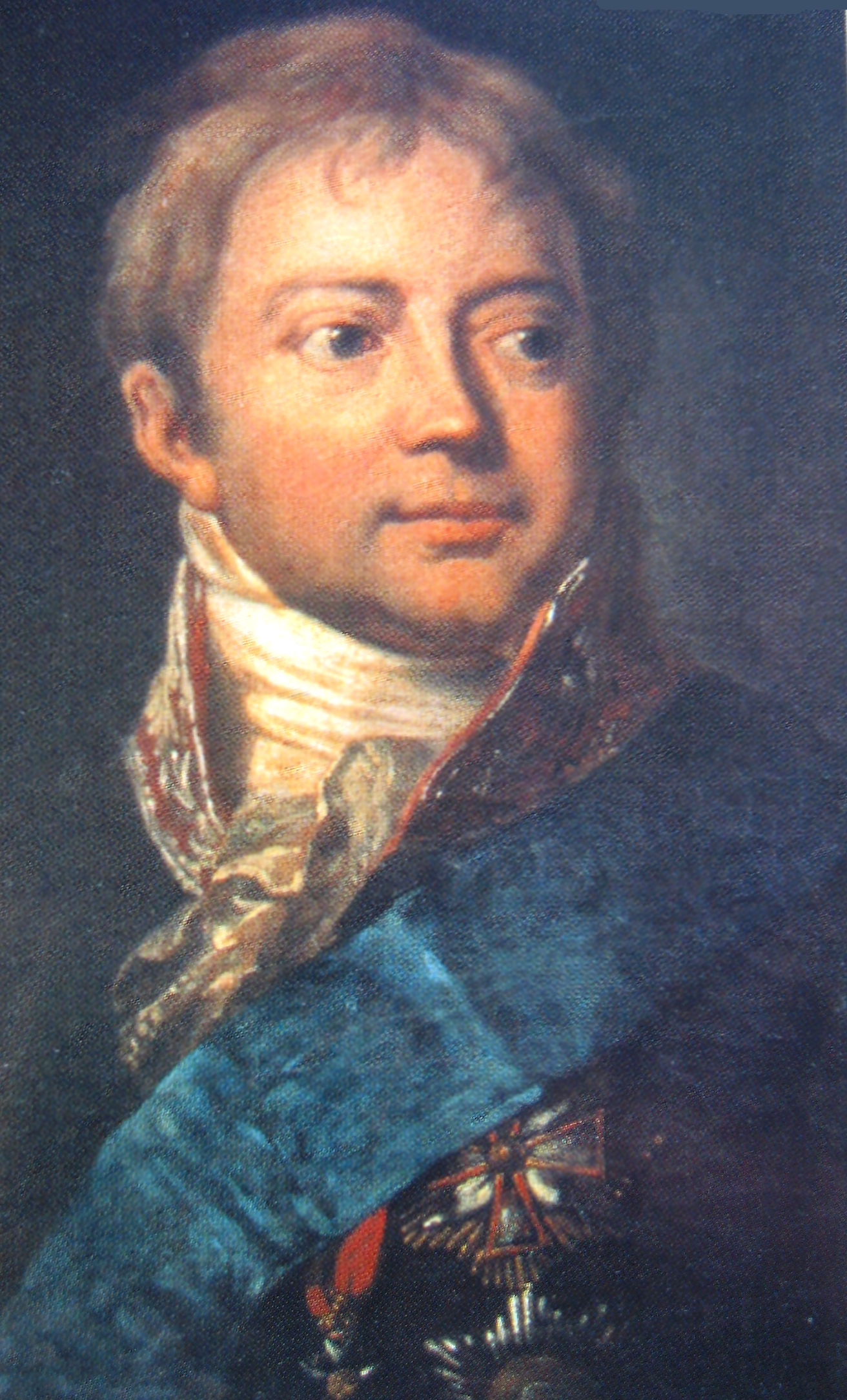
Jan Paweł Łuszczewski

Jan Paweł Łuszczewski (26 June 1764 in Skotniki, Masovian Voivodeship – 4 July 1812 in Warsaw) was a Polish politician who was an envoy to the Four-Year Sejm and later the Minister for Interior and Religious Affairs in the Duchy of Warsaw from 5 October 1807 until his death. He was also a Mason.

From 1785-95, he was a secretary to the king, Stanisław August Poniatowski, until his forced abdication. In 1788-89, he acted as a secretary for the Four-Year Sejm, at which he was also the secretary for the confederated Crown provinces, and from 1790, the envoy from the Sochaczew Land to said Sejm. As a member of the Patriotic Party, he was a supporter of the Constitution of 3 May in debates. On 29 April 1791, he received honorary citizenship of the city of Warsaw.

From 1800, he was a member of the Warsaw Society of Friends of Learning, to whom he left his political materials of the Four-Year Sejm. In 1806, he declared himself to be a supporter of Napoleon. As a consequence of this, he was appointed the next year to be a minister of the Napoleonic duchy. He was supported by the king Frederick August I and by the French ambassador Dominique-Georges-Frédéric Dufour de Pradt.

In 1807, he received the Legion of Honour and in 1809, became a chevalier of the Orders of St. Stanislaus and of the White Eagle.

He was married twice, firstly to Aleksandra Cieciszowska, with whom he had a daughter Ewa and three sons: Adam, Michał, and Wacław; and then to Ewa Orsetti, with whom he had a daughter Paulina. He is buried beside his first wife in Warsaw.
