= Izbiska =

Izbiska may refer to the following places:

- Izbiska, Masovian Voivodeship (east-central Poland)
- Izbiska, Silesian Voivodeship (south Poland)
- Izbiska, Subcarpathian Voivodeship (south-east Poland)
- Izbiska, Pomeranian Voivodeship (north Poland)
