= Piasecznica railway station =

Railway station in Nowa Piasecznica, Poland

Piasecznica

General information
- Location: Nowa Piasecznica, Masovian; Poland
- Coordinates: 52°12′35″N 20°20′44″E
- Owner: Polskie Koleje Państwowe S.A.
- Platforms: 2
- Tracks: 2

Services
Preceding station	Masovian Railways	Following station
Sochaczew towards Kutno	R3	Teresin Niepokalanów towards Warszawa Wschodnia or Warszawa Główna
Location

Piasecznica railway station is a railway station in Nowa Piasecznica, Poland. The station is served by Masovian Railways, who run trains from Kutno to Warszawa Wschodnia.
