= Radio Niepokalanów =

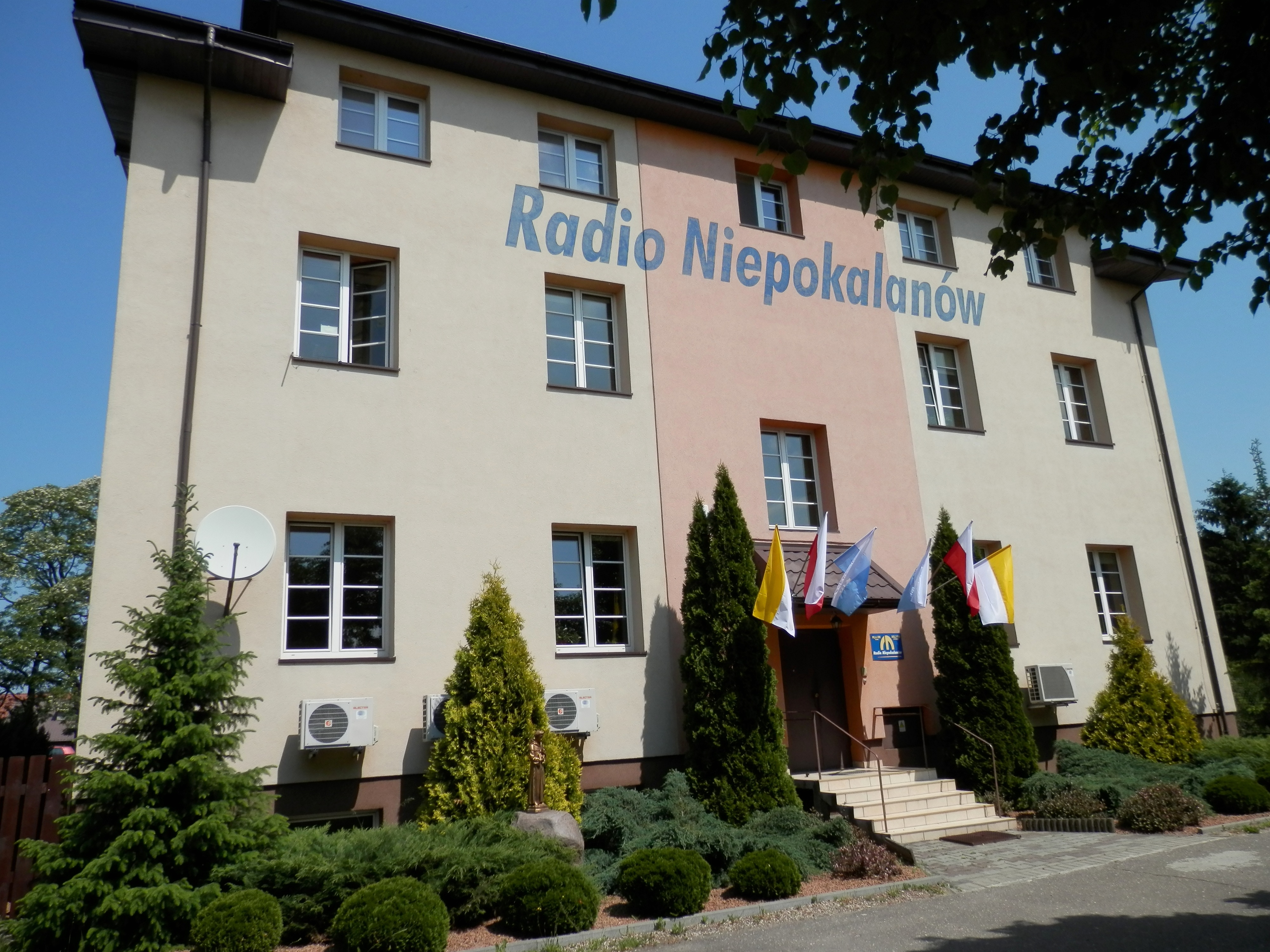
- Building of Radio Niepokalanów
- Poland
- Frequencies: Łódź Voivodeship: 98.6 MHz, Masovian Voivodeship: 102.7 MHz

Programming
- Language: Polish
- Format: Christian music, News

Ownership
- Owner: Order of Friars Minor Conventual in Warsaw

History
- First air date: 8 December 1938

Links
- Webcast: stream.rcs.revma.com/p1ty3x8nh72vv
- Website: radioniepokalanow.pl

Radio Niepokalanów is a radio station broadcasting in the Łódź Voivodeship at 98.6 MHz and the Masovian Voivodeship at 102.7 MHz. The station can also be listened to using DAB+ multiplexes in Gdańsk, Katowice, Warsaw and Wrocław. The Radio Niepokalanów premises are located in Niepokalanów, Gmina Teresin.

== History ==
After returning from a mission in Japan, Saint Maximilian Kolbe made the first efforts to start a radio station in Niepokalanów. For its needs, a brick building was erected in a considerable distance from the rooms where the printing machines were located. The first test radio transmission was broadcast on 8 December 1938, the Feast of the Immaculate Conception.

The station used to be named SP3-RN (Stacja Polska 3 - Radio Niepokalanów). Its call signal was a fragment of the melody of the song "Po górach, dolinach". The station managed to broadcast only a couple test broadcasts. The Franciscans' efforts to acquire a concession were interrupted by the outbreak of World War II.

After World War II, Radio Niepokalanów was reactivated on the 1 March 1995. Today, the station broadcasts in two Voivodeships: the Masovian Voivodeship and the Łódź Voivodeship. The station is also available online and on DAB+.

== Locations of broadcasting stations ==
- Skierniewice/Bartniki – 102.7 MHz – ERP 1 kW
- Łódź/Komin EC-4 – 98.6 MHz – ERP 2 kW (broadcasting since 15 January 2003)

== See also ==
- Saint Maximilian Kolbe
- Order of Friars Minor Conventual
