= Seroki railway station =

Railway station in Seroki-Parcela, Poland

Seroki

General information
- Location: Seroki-Parcela, Masovian; Poland
- Coordinates: 52°11′48″N 20°27′58″E
- Owner: Polskie Koleje Państwowe S.A.
- Platforms: 2
- Tracks: 2

Services
Preceding station	Masovian Railways	Following station
Teresin Niepokalanów towards Kutno	R3	Boża Wola towards Warszawa Wschodnia or Warszawa Główna
Location

Seroki railway station is a railway station in Seroki-Parcela, Poland. The station is served by Masovian Railways, who run trains from Kutno to Warszawa Wschodnia.
