= Teresin Niepokalanów railway station =

Railway station in Sochaczew County, Poland

Teresin Niepokalanów
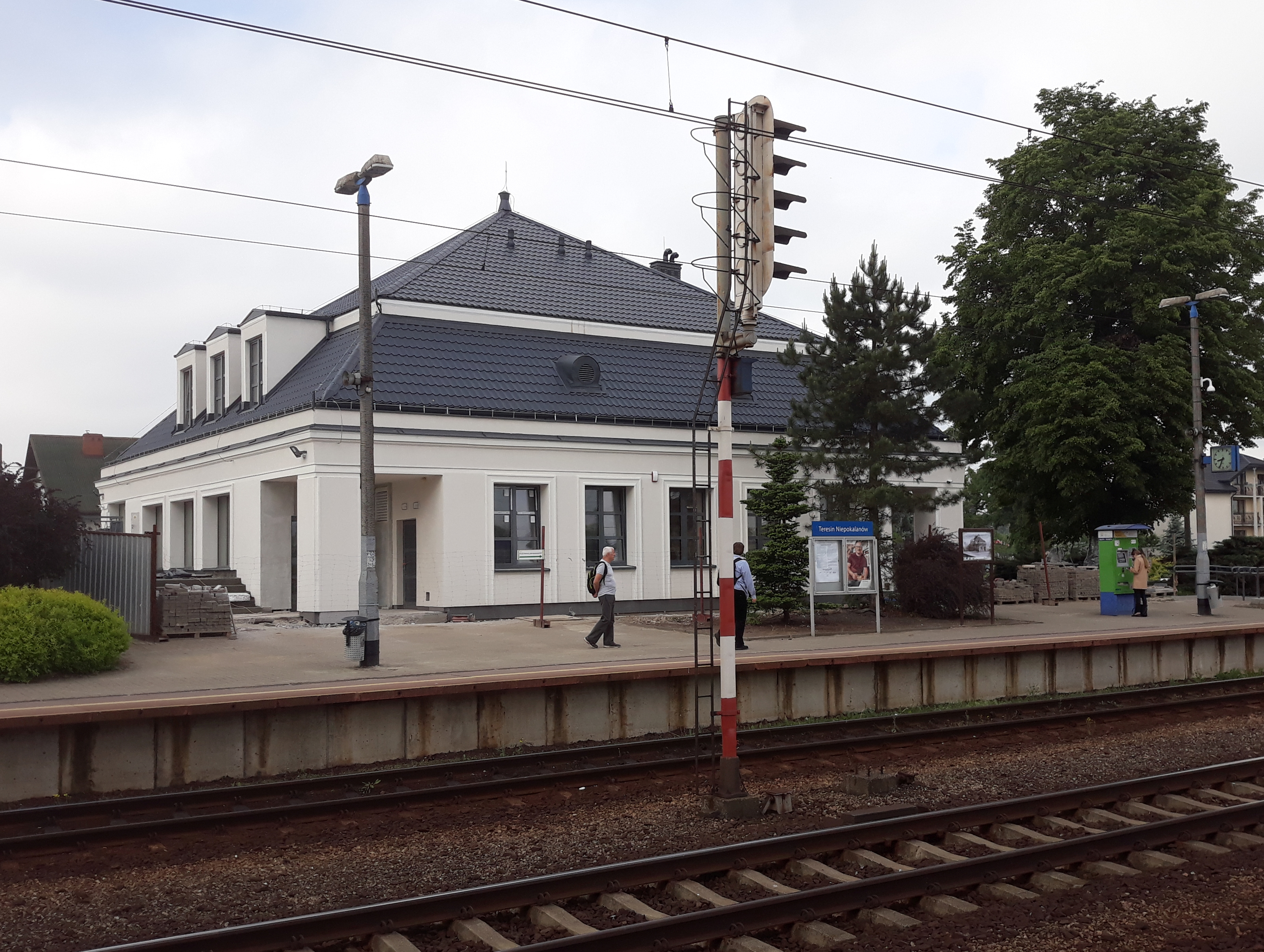

General information
- Location: Teresin, Masovian; Poland
- Coordinates: 52°12′08″N 20°24′50″E
- Owner: Polskie Koleje Państwowe S.A.
- Platforms: 2
- Tracks: 3

Services
Preceding station	Masovian Railways	Following station
Piasecznica towards Kutno	R3	Seroki towards Warszawa Wschodnia or Warszawa Główna
Location

Teresin Niepokalanów railway station is a railway station in Teresin, Poland. The station is served by Masovian Railways, who run trains from Kutno to Warszawa Wschodnia.
