= Dębówka, Sochaczew County =

Dębówka
- Village
- Location within Poland
- Coordinates: 52°11′N 20°21′E
- Country: Poland
- Voivodeship: Masovian
- County: Sochaczew
- Gmina: Teresin

Dębówka [dɛmˈbufka] is a village in the administrative district of Gmina Teresin, within Sochaczew County, Masovian Voivodeship, in east-central Poland.
