= Nowe Paski =

- Village
- Location within Poland
- Coordinates: 52°14′06″N 20°23′26″E
- Country: Poland
- Voivodeship: Masovian
- County: Sochaczew
- Gmina: Teresin

Nowe Paski [ˈnɔvɛ ˈpaski] is a village in the administrative district of Gmina Teresin, within Sochaczew County, Masovian Voivodeship, in east-central Poland.
