= Budki Piaseckie =

- Village
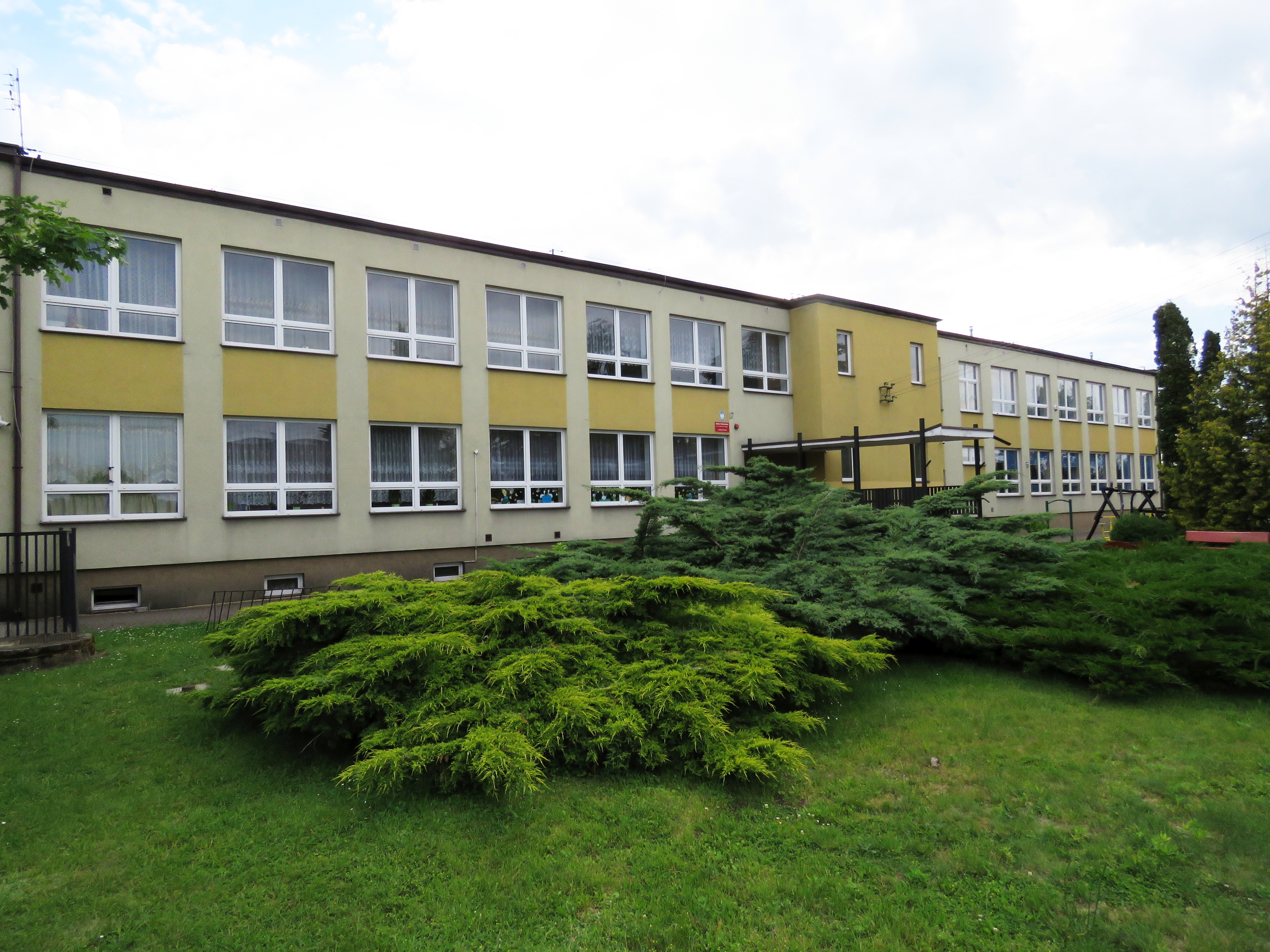
- Budki Piaseckie Primary School

- Location within Poland
- Coordinates: 52°11′42″N 20°19′48″E
- Country: Poland
- Voivodeship: Masovian
- County: Sochaczew
- Gmina: Teresin

Budki Piaseckie [ˈbutki pjaˈsɛt͡skʲɛ] is a village in the administrative district of Gmina Teresin, within Sochaczew County, Masovian Voivodeship, in east-central Poland.
