= Kawęczyn, Sochaczew County =

Kawęczyn
- Village
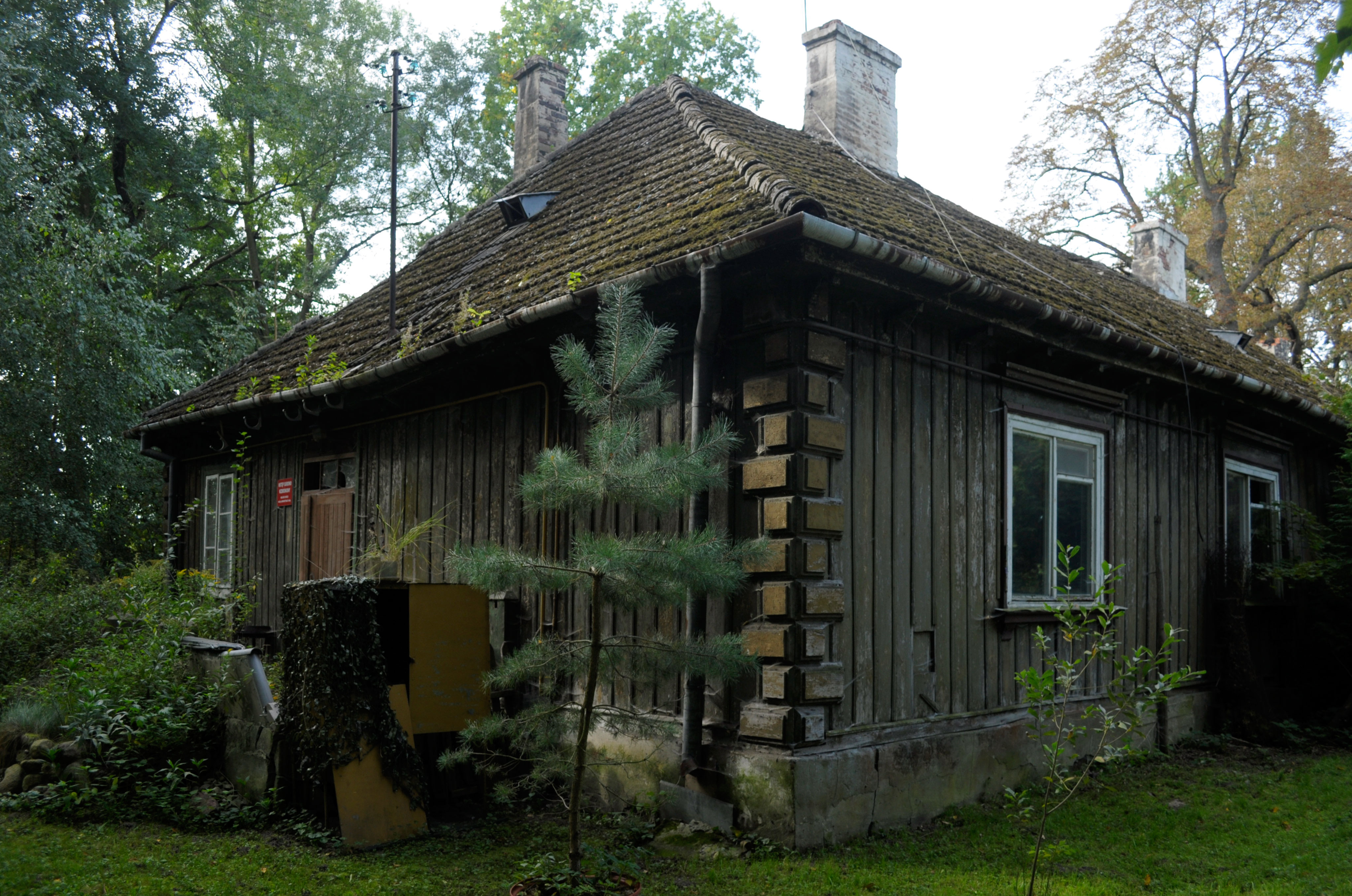

- Location within Poland
- Coordinates: 52°10′09″N 20°20′45″E
- Country: Poland
- Voivodeship: Masovian
- County: Sochaczew
- Gmina: Teresin
- Time zone: UTC+1 (CET)
  - Summer (DST): UTC+2 (CEST)
- Vehicle registration: WSC

Kawęczyn [kaˈvɛnt͡ʂɨn] is a village in the administrative district of Gmina Teresin, within Sochaczew County, Masovian Voivodeship, in central Poland.
