= Witoldów, Sochaczew County =

Witoldów
- Village
- Location within Poland
- Coordinates: 52°11′19″N 20°19′04″E
- Country: Poland
- Voivodeship: Masovian
- County: Sochaczew
- Gmina: Teresin

Witoldów (Polish pronunciation: [viˈtɔlduf]) is a village in the administrative district of Gmina Teresin, within Sochaczew County, Masovian Voivodeship, in east-central Poland.
