= Elżbietów, Sochaczew County =

Elżbietów
- Village
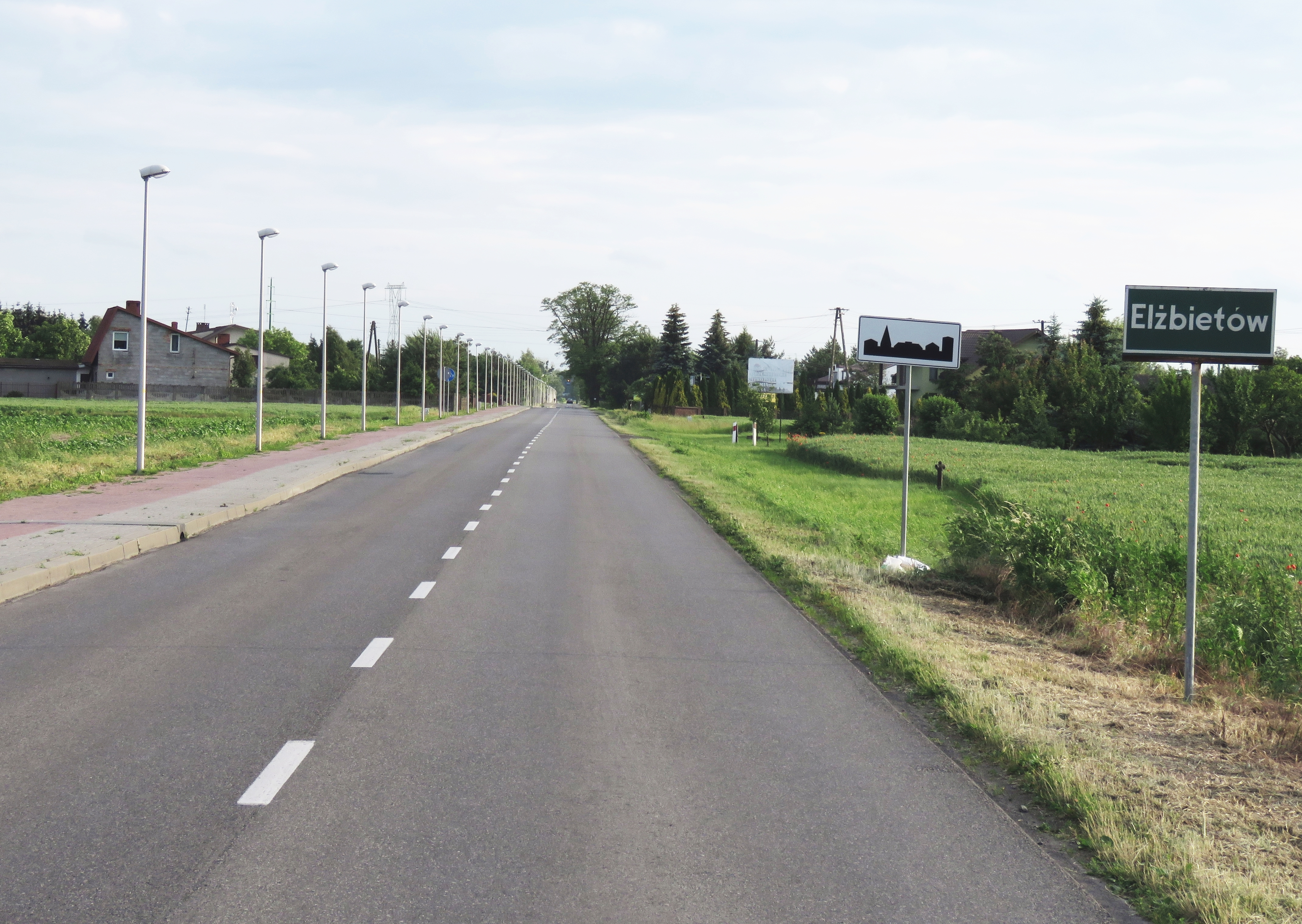
- Road sign in Elżbietów

- Location within Poland
- Coordinates: 52°10′24″N 20°23′25″E
- Country: Poland
- Voivodeship: Masovian
- County: Sochaczew
- Gmina: Teresin

Elżbietów [ɛlʐˈbjɛtuf] is a village in the administrative district of Gmina Teresin, within Sochaczew County, Masovian Voivodeship, in east-central Poland.
