= Teresin-Gaj =

- Village
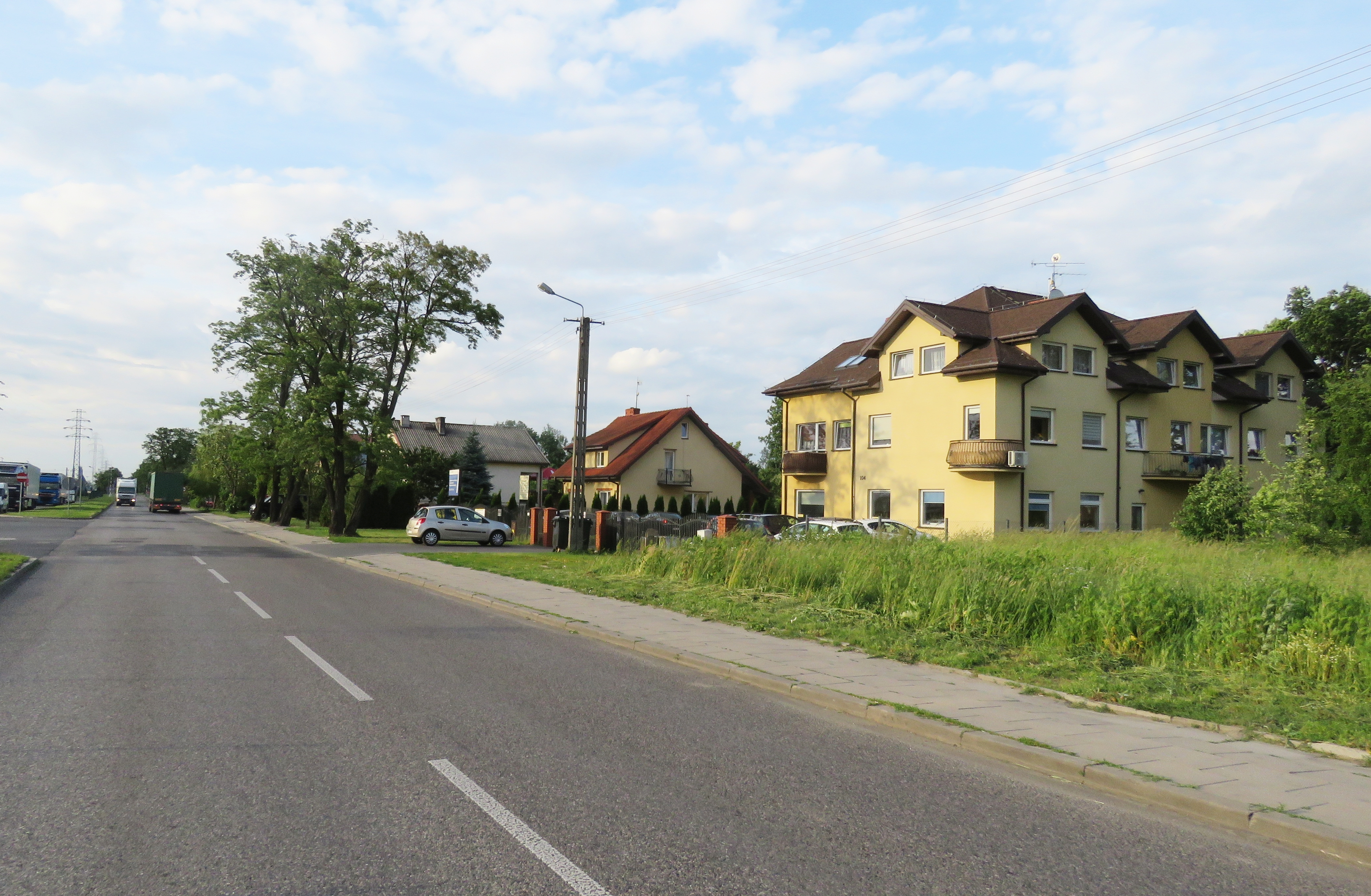
- Houses in Teresin-Gaj

- Coat of arms

- Location within Poland
- Coordinates: 52°12′27″N 20°23′31″E
- Country: Poland
- Voivodeship: Masovian
- County: Sochaczew
- Gmina: Teresin

Teresin-Gaj (Polish pronunciation: [tɛˈrɛɕiŋ ˈɡaj]) is a village in the administrative district of Gmina Teresin, within Sochaczew County, Masovian Voivodeship, in east-central Poland.
