= Skrzelew =

- Village
- Location within Poland
- Coordinates: 52°8′39″N 20°23′37″E
- Country: Poland
- Voivodeship: Masovian
- County: Sochaczew
- Gmina: Teresin

Skrzelew [ˈskʂɛlɛf] is a village in the administrative district of Gmina Teresin, within Sochaczew County, Masovian Voivodeship, in east-central Poland.
