= Granice, Masovian Voivodeship =

Granice
- Village
- Location within Poland
- Coordinates: 52°12′41″N 20°25′49″E
- Country: Poland
- Voivodeship: Masovian
- County: Sochaczew
- Gmina: Teresin

Granice [ɡraˈnit͡sɛ] is a village in the administrative district of Gmina Teresin, within Sochaczew County, Masovian Voivodeship, in east-central Poland.
