= Topołowa =

- Village
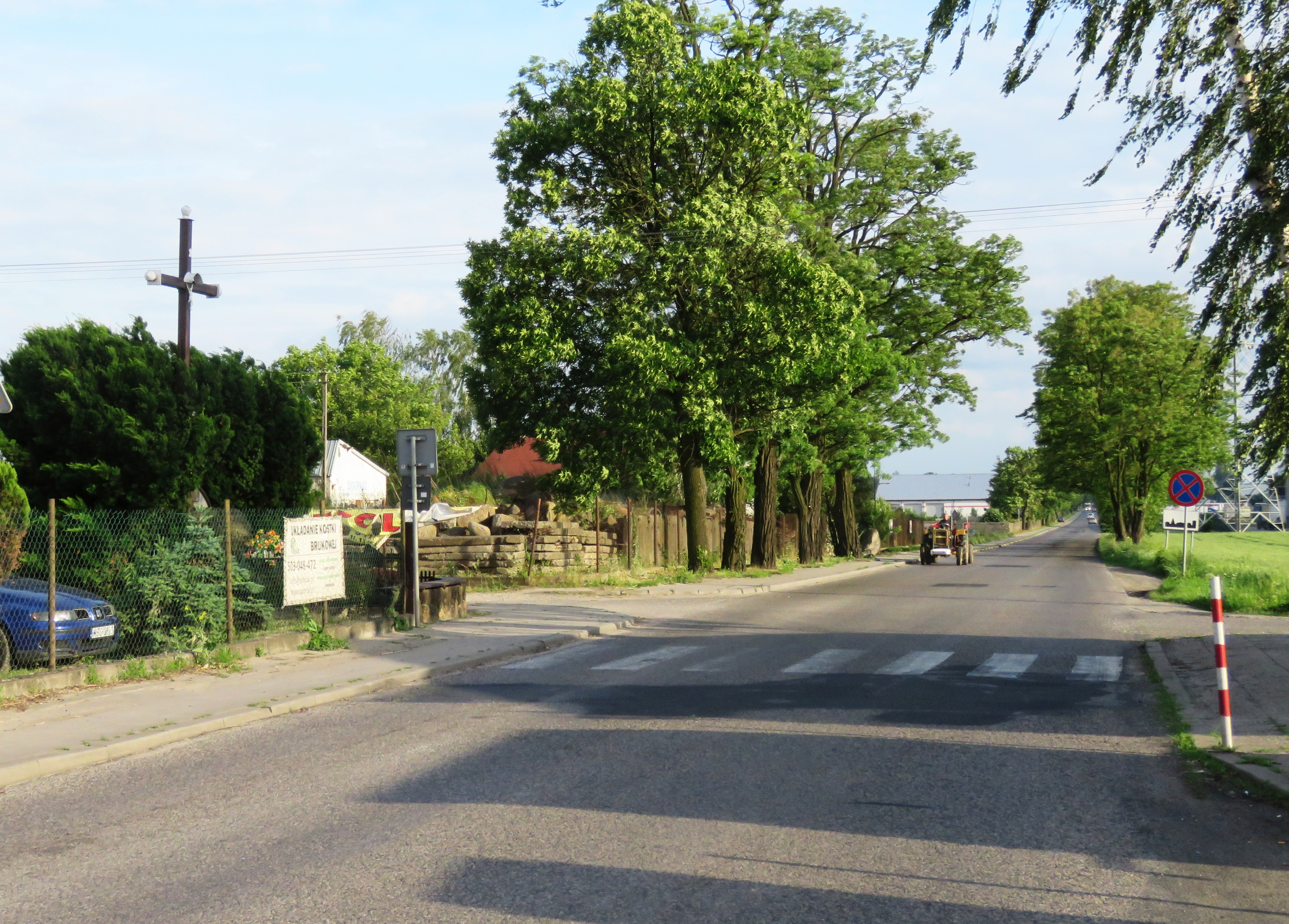
- Street of Topolowa Village, Poland

- Location within Poland
- Coordinates: 52°12′55″N 20°23′10″E
- Country: Poland
- Voivodeship: Masovian
- County: Sochaczew
- Gmina: Teresin

Topołowa [tɔpɔˈwɔva] is a village in the administrative district of Gmina Teresin, within Sochaczew County, Masovian Voivodeship, in east-central Poland.
