= Sochaczew railway station =

Railway station in Sochaczew, Poland

Sochaczew
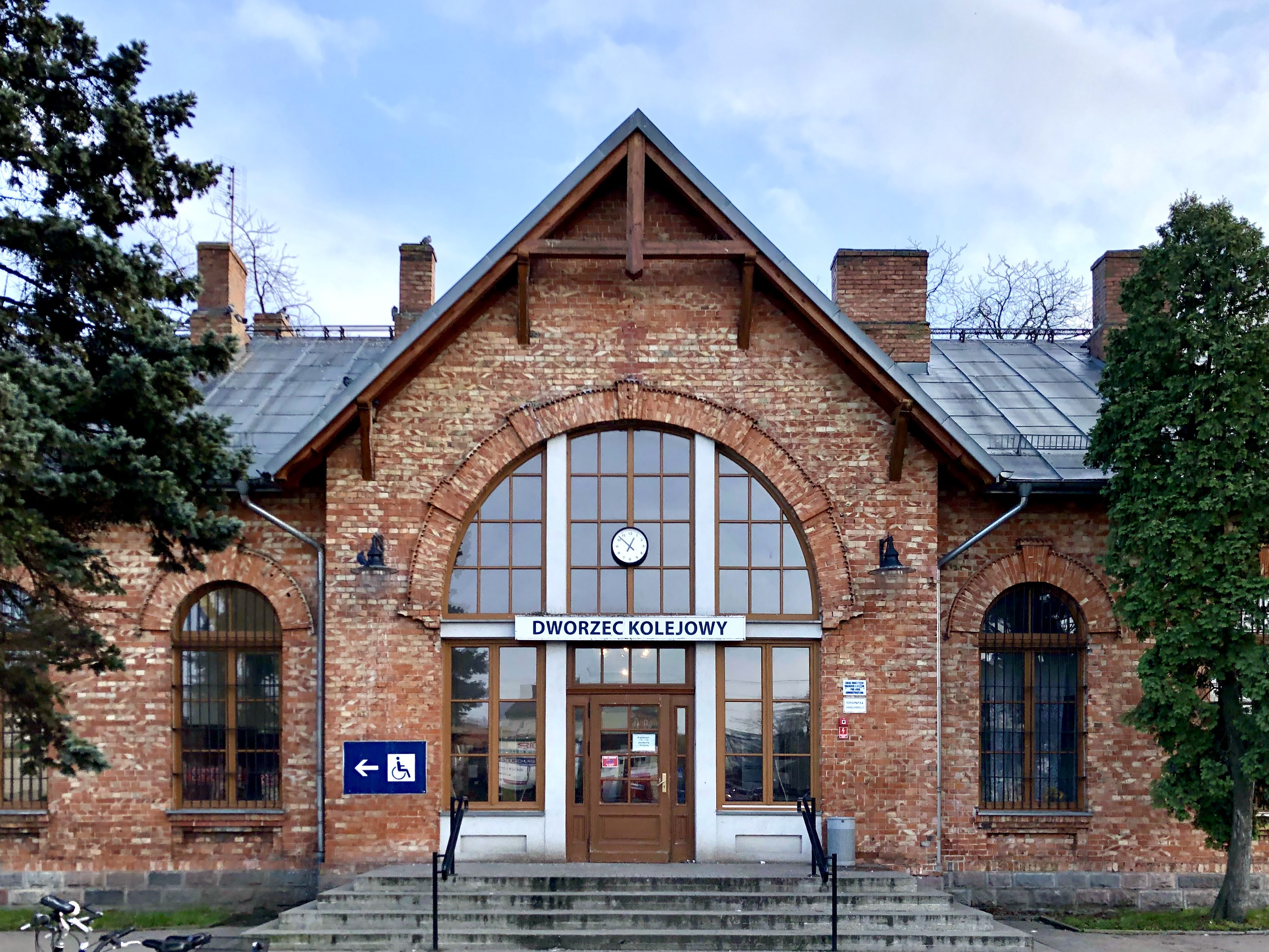
- Sochaczew railway station

General information
- Location: Sochaczew, Masovian Voivodeship; Poland
- System: Railway Station
- Operator: PKP Polskie Linie Kolejowe
- Lines: 3: Warsaw–Kunowice railway Sochaczew–Plecewice railway (closed)
- Platforms: 3

History
- Opened: 1902; 124 years ago
- Electrified: 1959; 67 years ago
Location
- Location within Masovian Voivodeship Location within Poland Location within Europe

Sochaczew railway station is a railway station serving the town of Sochaczew, in the Masovian Voivodeship, Poland. The station opened in 1902 and is located on the Warsaw–Kunowice railway and now closed Sochaczew–Plecewice railway. The train services are operated by PKP and Masovian Railways.

== History ==
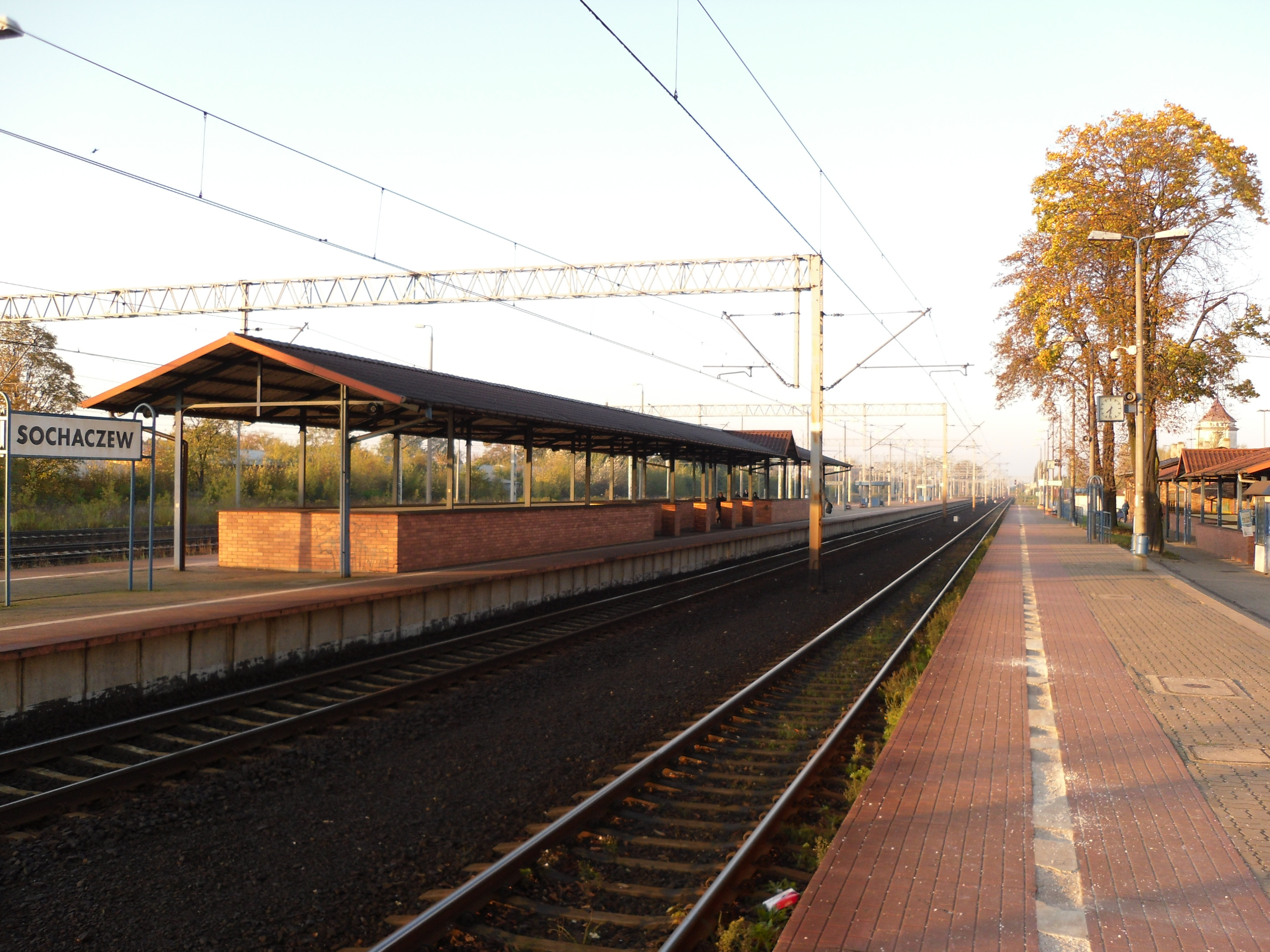
View of the platforms.

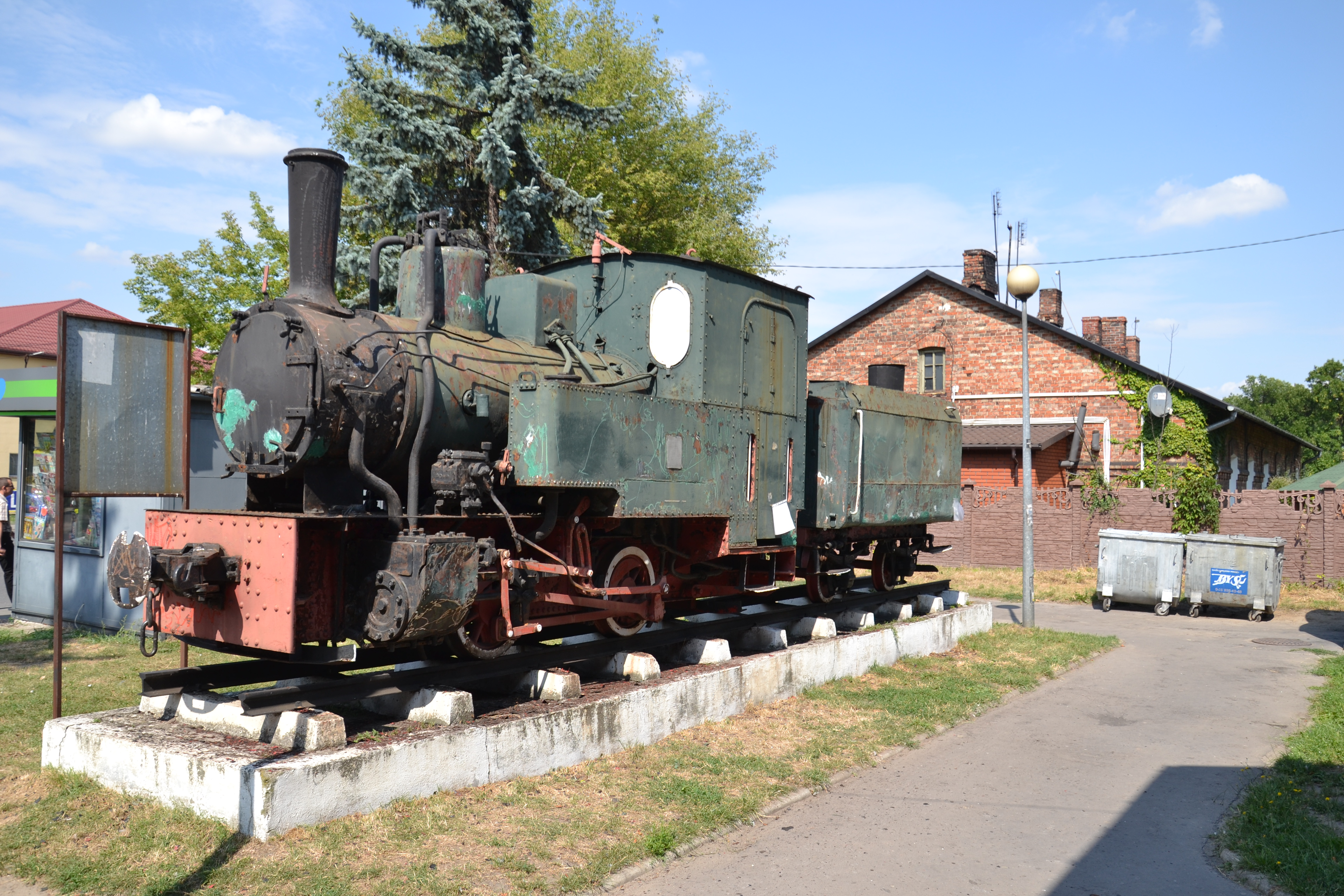
Steam engine plinthed at the station.

The station was built between 1900 and 1902 according to a design by Czesław Domaniewski on the broad gauge Warsaw–Kalisz Railway. In 1914 the line rebuilt to standard gauge and in 1916, the line became double track. The section from Błonie to Sochaczew was electrified in 1959 and in 1961 the next section to Kutno was electrified. The electrification of the E20 line was completed in 1988. In 1992 the modernisation of the section Warsaw - Poznan started, with the task to adapt the E20 route to a driving speed of 160 km/h. On the section Sochaczew - Łowicz permissible maximum speed is 120 km/h and on the section Błonie - Sochaczew - 160 km/h.

== Modernisation ==
In October 2015 renovation of the station, including the renovation of the main entrance and the replacement of windows and doors throughout the building was started.

== Train services ==
The station is served by the following service(s):

- Intercity services Szczecin - Stargard - Krzyz - Poznan - Kutno - Lowicz - Warsaw - Lublin - Rzeszow - Przemysl
- Intercity services Wroclaw - Ostrow Wielkopolskie - Jarocin - Poznan - Kutno - Lowicz - Warsaw
- Intercity services Kolobrzeg - Pila - Bydgoszcz - Torun - Kutno - Lowicz - Warsaw
- Intercity services Gorzow Wielkopolskie - Krzyz - Pila - Bydgoszcz - Torun - Kutno - Lowicz - Warsaw
- Intercity services Szczecin - Pila - Bydgoszcz - Torun - Kutno - Lowicz - Warsaw - Lublin - Rzeszow - Przemysl
- Intercity services Gdynia - Gdansk - Bydgoszcz - Torun - Kutno - Lowicz - Warsaw - Lublin - Rzeszow - Zagorz/Przemysl
- Regional services (KM) Kutno - Lowicz - Sochaczew - Blonie - Warsaw
- Regional services (KM) Lowicz - Sochaczew - Blonie - Warsaw - Minsk Mazowiecki

Preceding station	Masovian Railways	Following station
Kornelin towards Kutno	R3	Piasecznica towards Warszawa Wschodnia or Warszawa Główna
Kornelin towards Łowicz Główny	R3	Piasecznica towards Minsk Mazowiecki
