= Lisice, Masovian Voivodeship =

Lisice
- Village
- Location within Poland
- Coordinates: 52°13′N 20°29′E
- Country: Poland
- Voivodeship: Masovian
- County: Sochaczew
- Gmina: Teresin

Lisice [liˈɕit͡sɛ] is a village in the administrative district of Gmina Teresin, within Sochaczew County, Masovian Voivodeship, in east-central Poland.
