= Strugi, Masovian Voivodeship =

Strugi
- Village
- Location within Poland
- Coordinates: 52°9′30″N 20°20′46″E
- Country: Poland
- Voivodeship: Masovian
- County: Sochaczew
- Gmina: Teresin
- Population: 23

Strugi [ˈstruɡi] is a village in the administrative district of Gmina Teresin, within Sochaczew County, Masovian Voivodeship, in east-central Poland.
