= Seroki-Wieś =

- Village
- Location within Poland
- Coordinates: 52°12′18″N 20°26′29″E
- Country: Poland
- Voivodeship: Masovian
- County: Sochaczew
- Gmina: Teresin

Seroki-Wieś [sɛˈrɔki ˈvjɛɕ] is a village in the administrative district of Gmina Teresin, within Sochaczew County, Masovian Voivodeship, in east-central Poland.
