= Nowe Gnatowice =

- Village
- Location within Poland
- Coordinates: 52°13′27″N 20°24′15″E
- Country: Poland
- Voivodeship: Masovian
- County: Sochaczew
- Gmina: Teresin

Nowe Gnatowice [ˈnɔvɛ ɡnatɔˈvit͡sɛ] is a village in the administrative district of Gmina Teresin, within Sochaczew County, Masovian Voivodeship, in east-central Poland.
