= Ludwików, Gmina Teresin =

Ludwików
- Village
- Location within Poland
- Coordinates: 52°11′N 20°28′E
- Country: Poland
- Voivodeship: Masovian
- County: Sochaczew
- Gmina: Teresin
- Population: 140

Ludwików [ludˈvikuf] is a village in the administrative district of Gmina Teresin, within Sochaczew County, Masovian Voivodeship, in east-central Poland.
