= Maurycew =

- Village
- Location within Poland
- Coordinates: 52°08′34″N 20°21′18″E
- Country: Poland
- Voivodeship: Masovian
- County: Sochaczew
- Gmina: Teresin

Maurycew [mauˈrɨt͡sɛf] is a village in the administrative district of Gmina Teresin, within Sochaczew County, Masovian Voivodeship, in east-central Poland.
