= Pawłówek, Sochaczew County =

Pawłówek
- Village
- Location within Poland
- Coordinates: 52°9′N 20°23′E
- Country: Poland
- Voivodeship: Masovian
- County: Sochaczew
- Gmina: Teresin
- Time zone: UTC+1 (CET)
  - Summer (DST): UTC+2 (CEST)

Pawłówek [paˈvwuvɛk] is a village in the administrative district of Gmina Teresin, within Sochaczew County, Masovian Voivodeship, in east-central Poland.

Six Polish citizens were murdered by Nazi Germany in the village during World War II.
