= Basilica of the Omni-mediatress of All Glories =

Church in central Poland

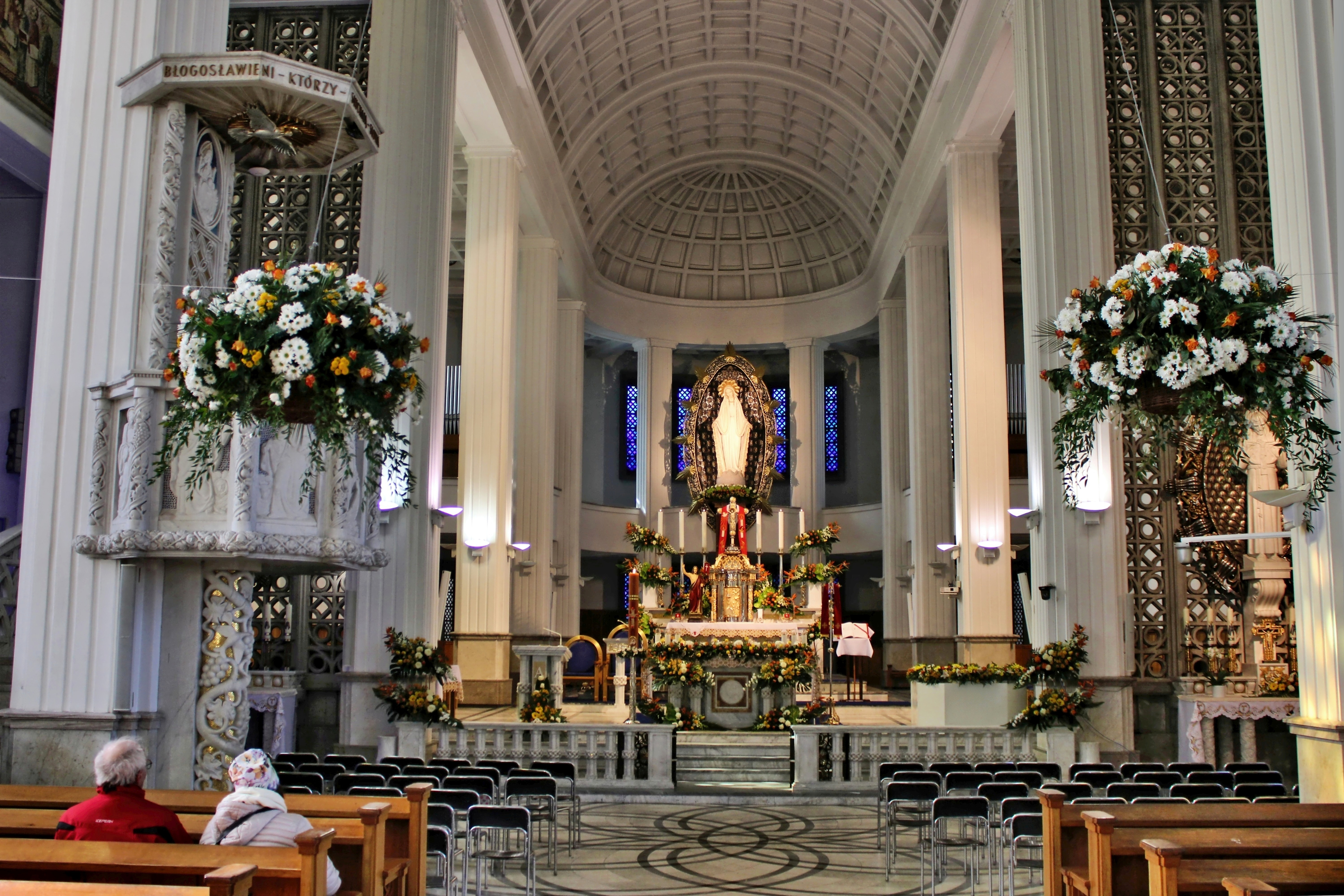
- View of the main altar in the basilica of the BVM the Immaculate (Easter time)

Religion
- Affiliation: Roman Catholic
- Diocese: Archdiocese of Warsaw
- Year consecrated: October 1954
- Status: Basilica, parish church

Location
- Location: Niepokalanów, 96-515 Teresin, Poland
- Interactive map of Basilica of the Omni-mediatress of All Glories
- Coordinates: 52°12′14″N 20°25′14″E

Architecture
- Architect: Zygmunt Gawlik
- Completed: 1954

Specifications
- Capacity: up to 5000
- Length: total: 84.8 metres (278 ft); inside: 69 metres (226 ft)
- Width: naves: 18 metres (59 ft); with both side chapels: 33 metres (108 ft)
- Height (max): main nave: 16 metres (52 ft); tower clock: 47 metres (154 ft)

Website
- http://niepokalanow.pl

The Basilica of the Omni-mediatress of All Glories is a church in Niepokalanów, Poland. It was designed by the architect Zygmunt Gawlik from Kraków. It was built in 1948–1954. In June 1950 it became a parish church for a new parish in Niepokalanów.

Three-nave church can accommodate up to three thousand people. The height of the church tower is 47 m. Three massive, double winged doors hold symbols of the most famous places of Marian apparitions around the world. In April 1980, Pope John Paul II granted the church the title of the basilica minor.

== Plans and construction of the church ==
The first idea to build a new church in Niepokalanów (or at least a large chapel), appeared before the Second World War. In June 1933 the magazine "Rycerz Niepokalanej" ("The Knight of the Immaculate") wrote: It is necessary to build a new chapel, or – as some of the readers suggest – a church, because there is no room to accommodate all of us in this one. If it were only up to us, we would somehow manage to fit, but then the local population would no longer be able to attend our services. Unfortunately, at that time, the Franciscans did not have adequate funds to start the building.

Construction plans were prepared and approved in December 1938 in Warsaw. An external company was hired for analysis of the land on which the church was to stand. In May 1939, there was blessed a cross on the square assigned for building the church. The outbreak of war in September 1939, stopped the work for a long time. Most of the materials collected for the construction were plundered by the Nazis in December 1939.

After the war, in June 1948, the first brick was put for the building of a new church. The design was made by the architect Zygmunt Gawlik from Cracow. Professional co-friars worked at decoration of the interior of the church: sculptors, stonemasons, blacksmiths and so on. Many of the sculptures were made by friar-artist Maurycy Kowalewski, with the help of friar Abel Dziełyński and the other friars. The church, devoted to the BVM the Immaculate, the Omni-mediatress of All Glories, could hold up to 3000 people. It was consecrated on 3 October 1954 by Bishop Wacław Majewski, who replaced the imprisoned cardinal Stefan Wyszyński.

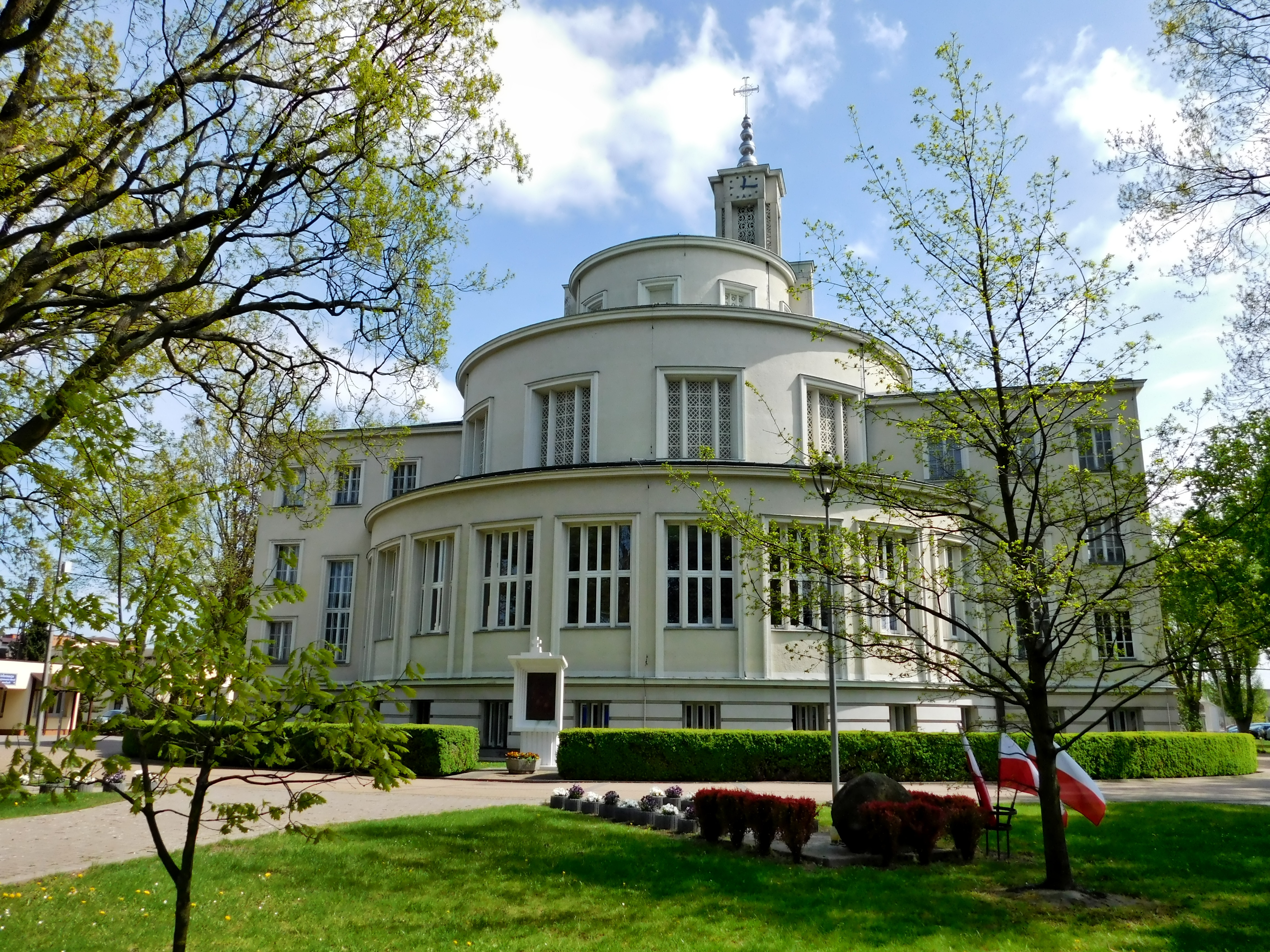
Basilica of St Mary Immaculate seen from the west side

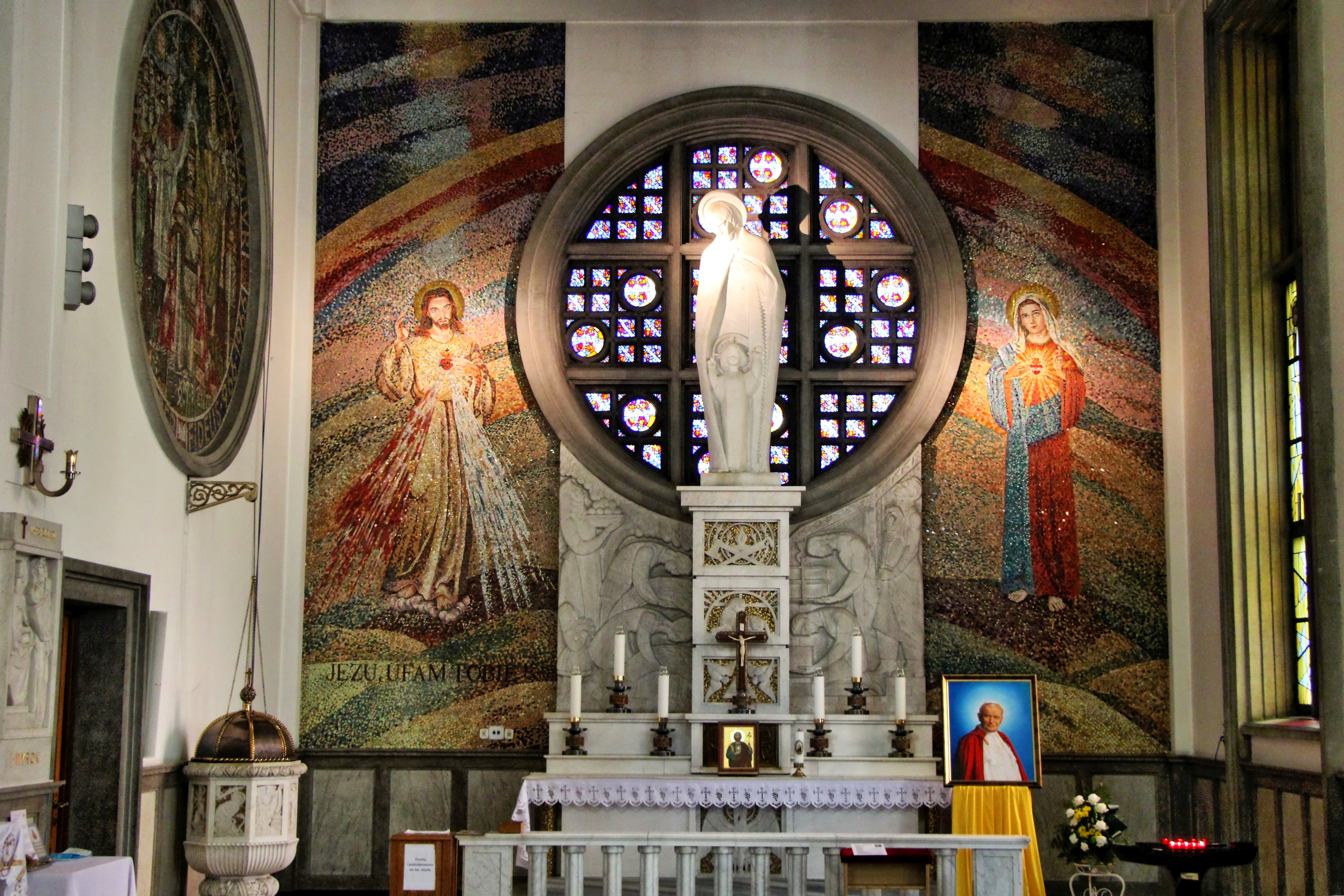
St. Joseph's chapel (northern wing)

A clock with five dials was installed on the church's bell tower. The four clock bells, which chime the quarters and the hours, were named: Knight of the Immaculata, Maximilian, Francis and Anthony. Beneath the presbytery there is a Chapel of Our Lady of Częstochowa, where has been set a Panorama (the Millennium History of the Church in Poland). Furthermore, two organs were installed in the basilica: a 16 pipe organ (in the presbytery) and another 49 pipe organ (in the choir loft), the work of Włodzimierz Truszczyński.

== Architecture and specifications ==
Entering the church, a visitor can see the statue of Our Lady Immaculate in the main altar. This statue is a work of Maurycy Kowalewski and Abel Dziełyński, friars-sculptors from Niepokalanów. In the chapel of St. Joseph (on the right side of the church) there are two important mosaics. The first of them (round mosaic) commemorates the baptism of Poland. The Latin inscription says: Mesco dux baptizatur – Polonia semper fidelis - 966-1966 (Prince Mieszko baptized – Poland is always faithful – 966-1966). The second, huge mosaic (placed on the wall) shows Jesus the Merciful and the Immaculate Heart of Our Lady.

The chapel on the left side is dedicated to St. Maximilian Kolbe. A marble statue of the saint, placed in the central part of the chapel, offers the entire globe to the Mother of God. On the chapel walls there are hung many votive offerings, in thanksgiving for the graces received. A round mosaic, located next to them, presents a speech of St. Maximilian to the co-prisoners in the Auschwitz camp. Near, in the central part of the church there is situated a Carrara marble ambo with some bas-reliefs of the Holy Trinity, Christ teaching in the boat and the figures of the Evangelists.

The dimensions of the basilica are:
– the length from the beginning of the stairs to the end of the apse – 84,8 m.
– the length of the interior of the basilica – 69 m.
– the width of the church – 18 m. (the width with both side chapels – 33 m.)
– the height of the main nave – 16 m.
– the width of the church facade (eastern) – 22 m.
– the height of the tower clock, which houses four bells and a clockwork mechanism – 47 m.
– the interior surface area is 1144 m².
– the maximum capacity of the basilica is up to 3,000 people.

== Pilgrimages. Basilica today ==
Since the time of the beatifications of Fr. Maximilian Kolbe (1971), many important guests and pilgrims from all over the world visited Niepokalanów and the local basilica. There were bishops, cardinals and high rank politic officials among them. Cardinal Stefan Wyszynski, Primate of Poland, who visited Niepokalanów several times, said once: Before the war Niepokalanów grew far and wide. After the war the hard times came, and then the Franciscans, unable to keep up their common job, did the wisest thing they could – they built a church.

On 18 June 1983, during the 2nd Pastoral Visit in Poland, Pope John Paul II visited the basilica and the monastery in Niepokalanów. In the basilica he met the representatives of religious orders to which he gave a speech. Then, during the Holy Mass at the field altar he preached a sermon to over 300,000 people. The visit of the pope increased the number of pilgrims coming to Niepokalanów. Many people wanted to visit the place, sacred by activity of St. Maximilian, and to pray in the local basilica.

In view of the Great Jubilee of 2000, the basilica underwent a complete restoration, both internal and external. In April 2002, two new mural mosaics were inaugurated in the basilica (precisely in the chapel of St. Joseph). One of them presents Jesus the Merciful while the other the Immaculate Heart of Mary. In August 2015, a new altar and a small ambo in white marble were installed in the presbytery. In September 2018, the chapel of perpetual adoration was inaugurated in the south wing of the basilica. With this inauguration, sanctuary in Niepokalanów became part of an initiative to create 12 international centers of continuous prayer for peace in the world.

== Gallery ==
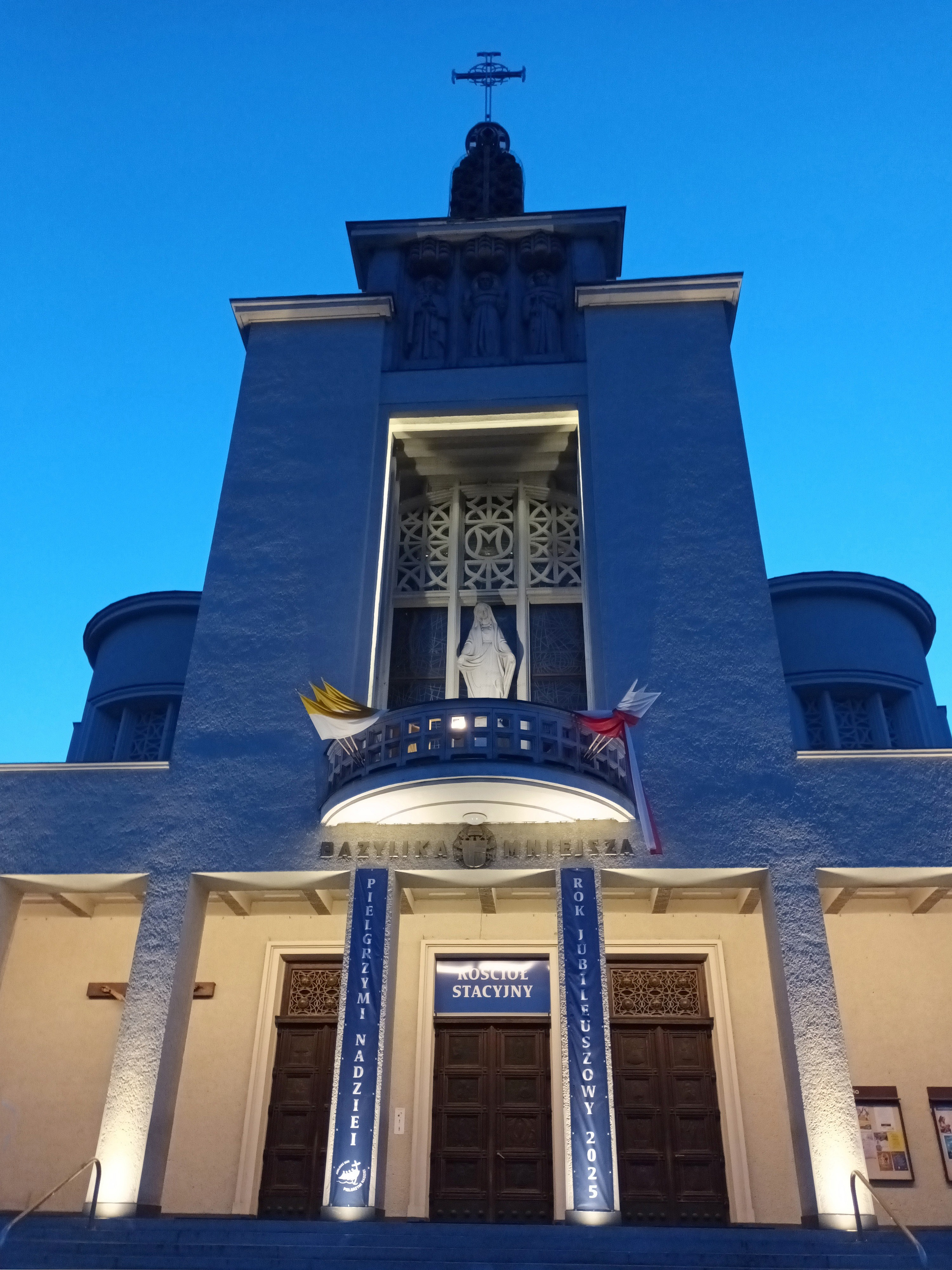
Evening view

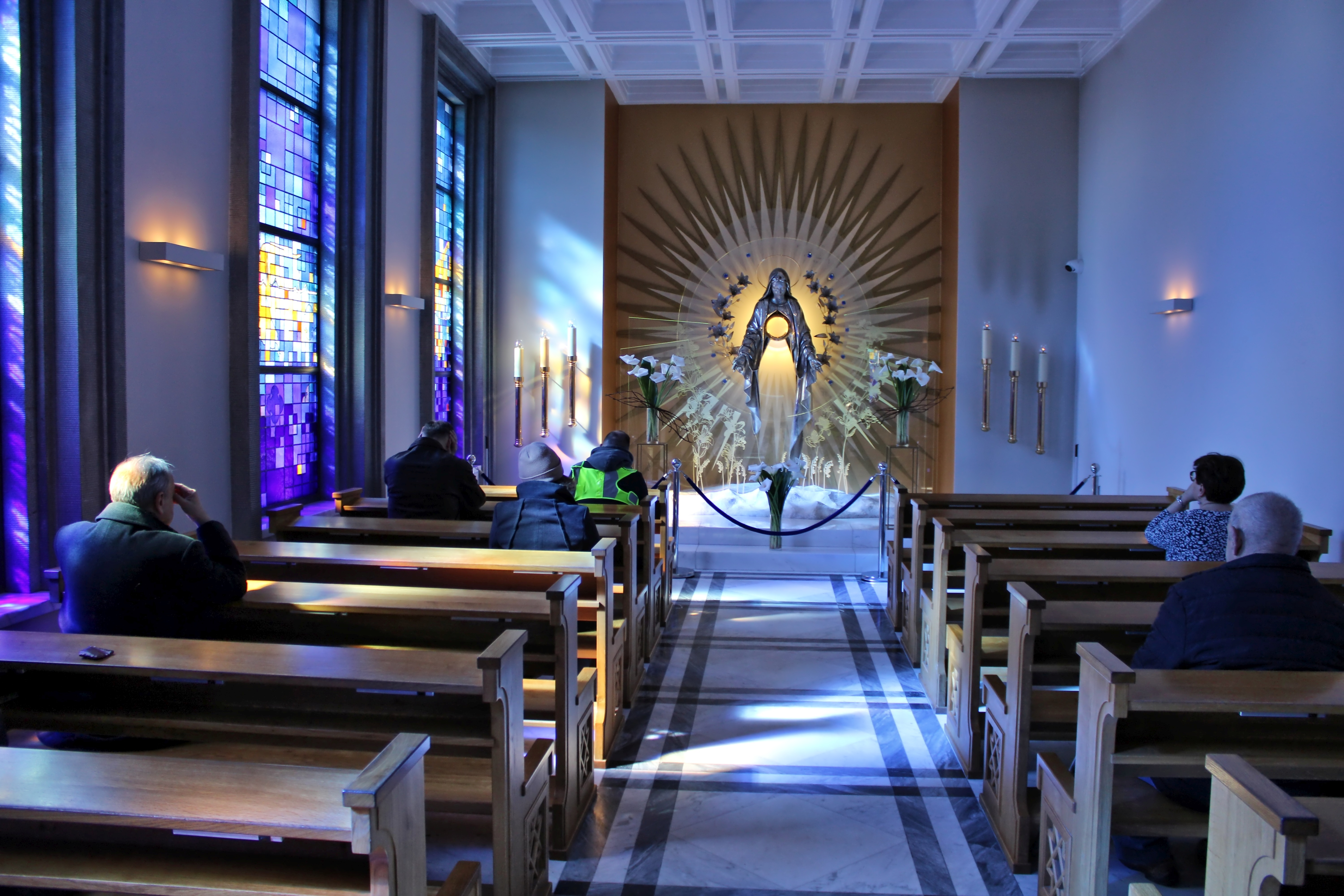
Chapel of adoration

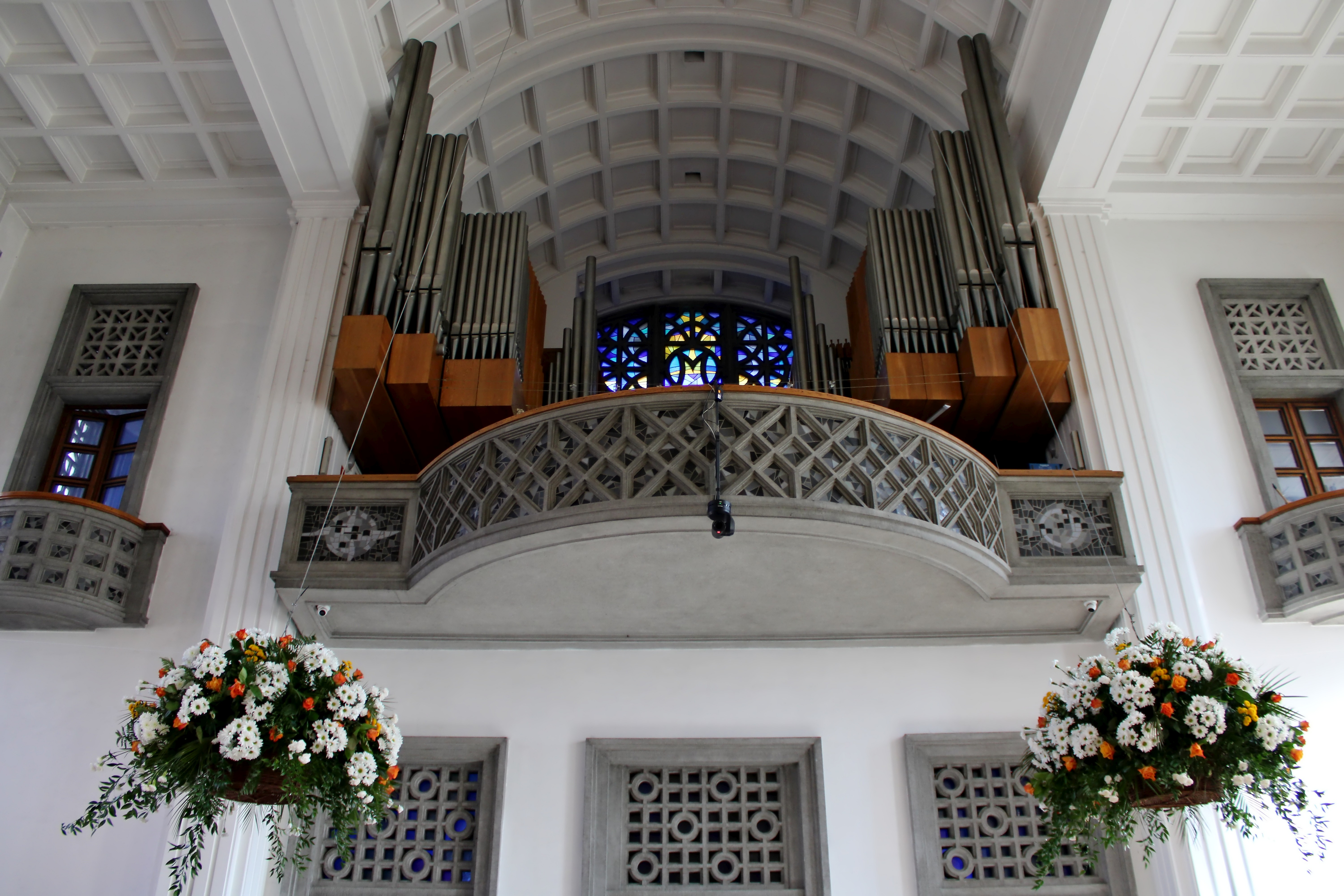
49-voice organ

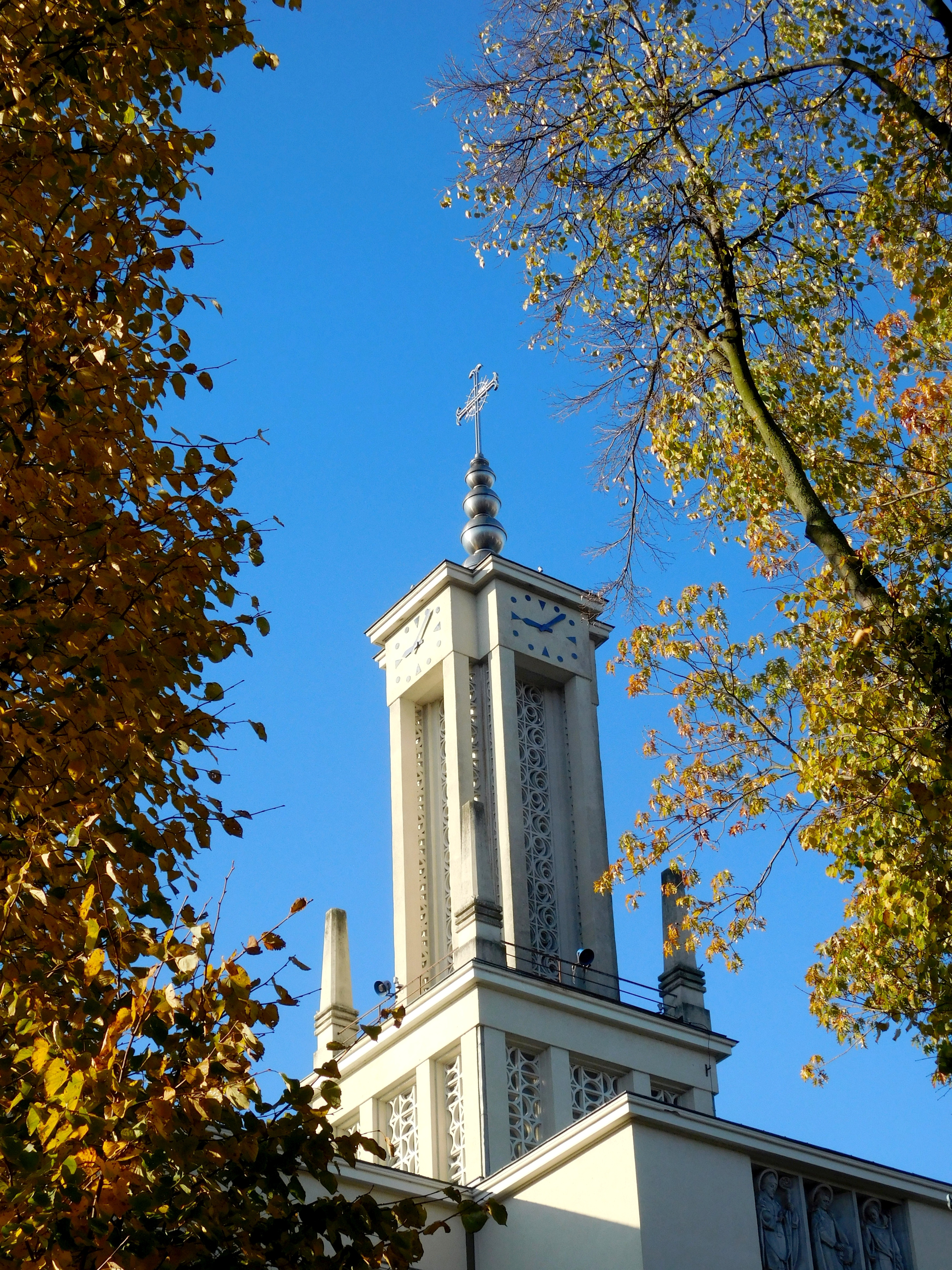
Tower clock

== Source materials ==
- Niepokalanów. Pilgrim-tourist guide, Fr. Roman Soczewka OFMConv. Wydawnictwo Ojców Franciszkanów, Niepokalanów 2016 (fifth revised edition), ISBN 978-83-7766-113-0
- Niepokalanów monastery – Official site in Polish language
- o. Cezar Czesław Baran OFMConv., Franciszkańskie sanktuaria maryjne w Polsce (Franciscan Marian shrines in Poland). Wydawnictwo Pelikan, Warszawa 1990, ISBN 83-85045-17-1 (book in Polish)
- Miasto Niepokalanej (City of the Immaculate – article in Polish), p. 216-219, in: Rycerz Niepokalanej (The Knight of the Immaculate) nr 7-8/2010, Niepokalanów, ISSN 0208-8878
- o. Witalis Jaśkiewicz OFMConv. Pięćdziesiąt lat Niepokalanowa, 1927- 1977 (Fifty years of Niepokalanów, 1927- 1977) (book in Polish). OO. Franciszkanie – Niepokalanów 1979
