= Mikołajew, Masovian Voivodeship =

Mikołajew
- Village
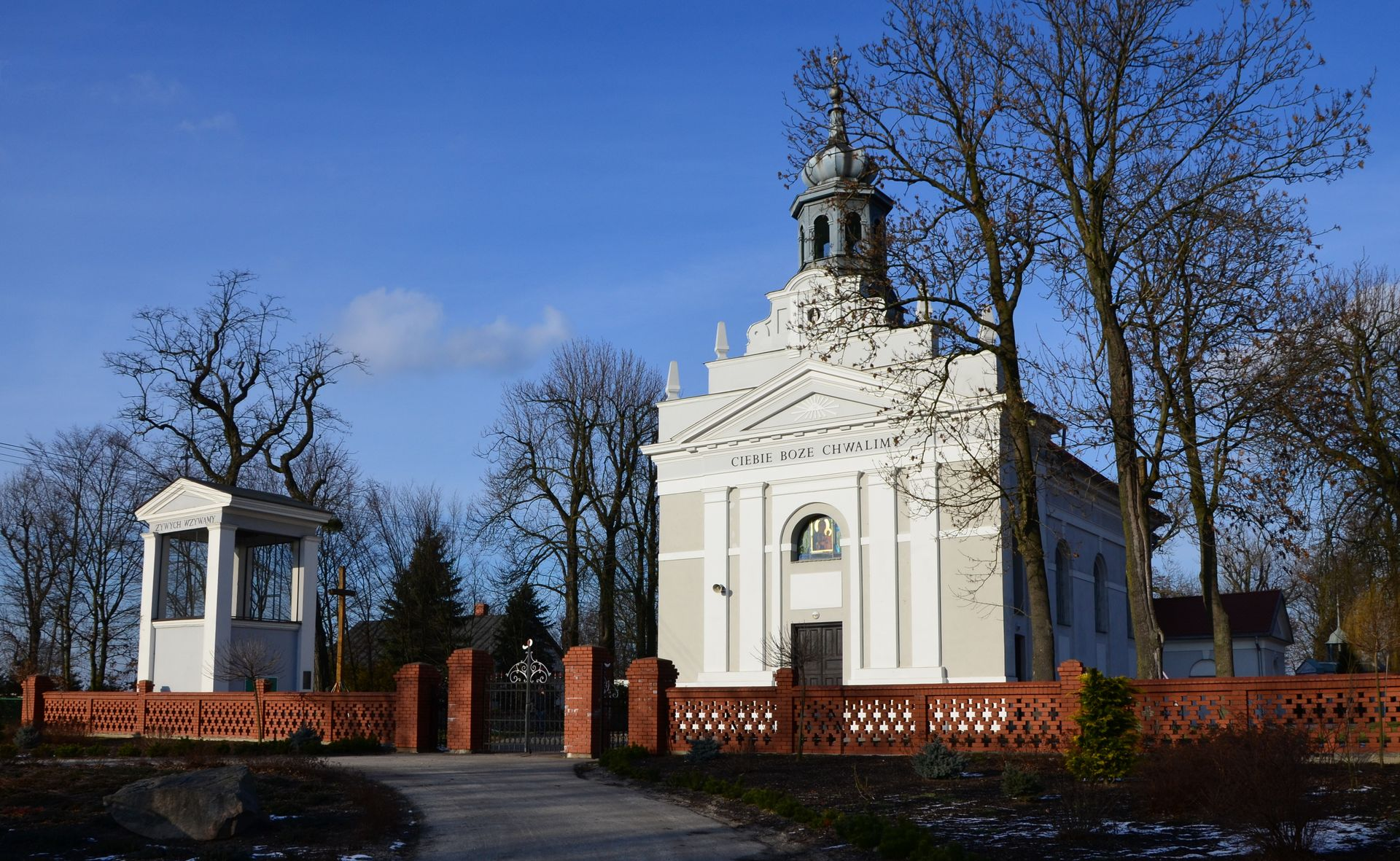
- Saints John and Paul church in Mikołajew

- Location within Poland
- Coordinates: 52°10′32″N 20°19′26″E
- Country: Poland
- Voivodeship: Masovian
- County: Sochaczew
- Gmina: Teresin

Mikołajew [mikɔˈwajɛf] is a village in the administrative district of Gmina Teresin, within Sochaczew County, Masovian Voivodeship, in east-central Poland.
