= Museum of St. Maximilian Kolbe "There was a Man" =

Museum in Poland

Coordinates: 52°12′16″N 20°25′15″E

"There was a Man" Museum of St. Maximilian in Niepokalanów
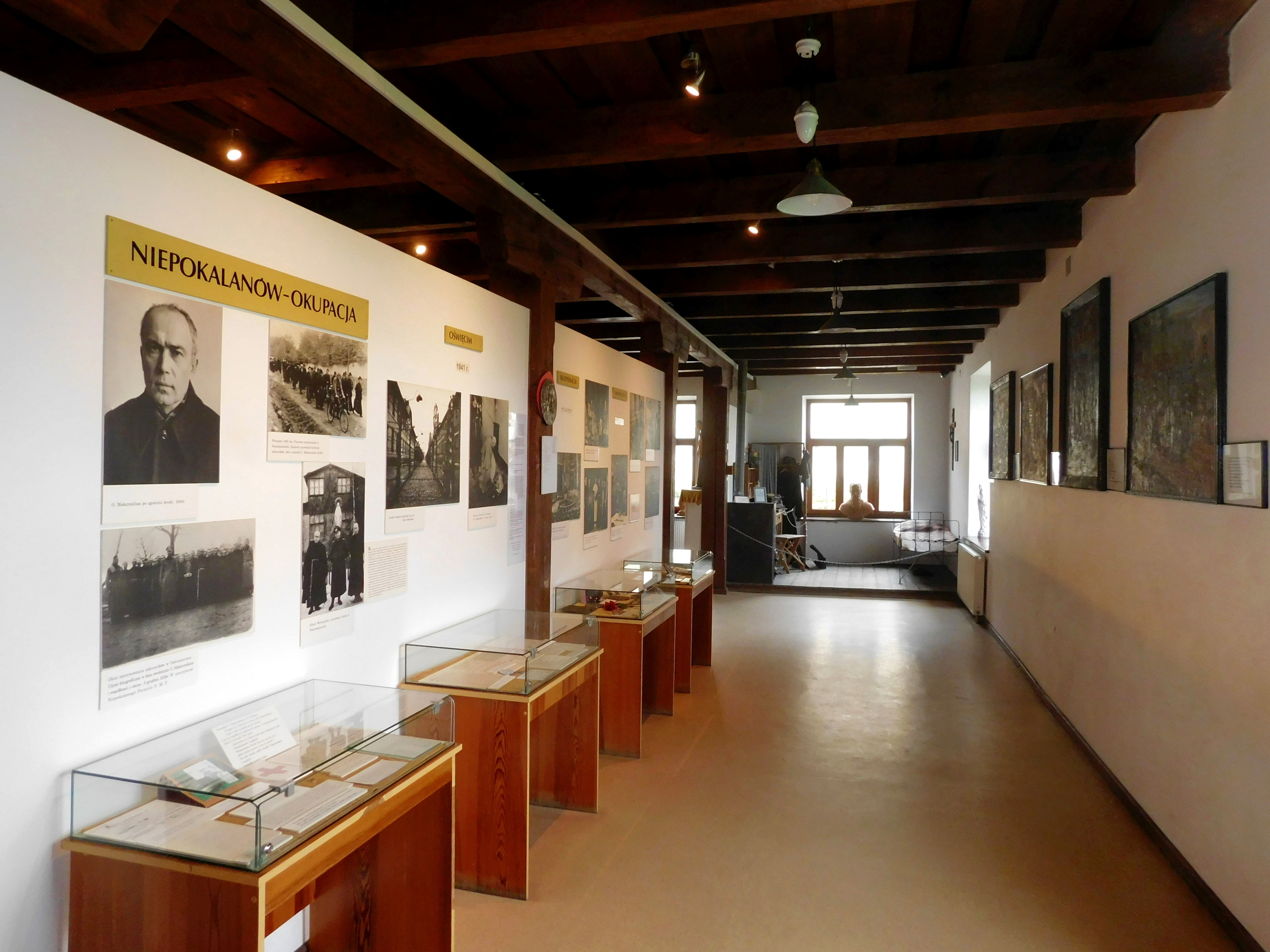
- Museum, part of the war exhibition
- Established: August 1998
- Location: Niepokalanów, 96-515 Teresin, Poland
- Type: religious, historical and missionary

Museum of St. Maximilian Kolbe "There was a Man" (in Polish: Muzeum św. Maksymiliana "Był człowiek") – is a museum, located in Niepokalanów in central Poland, 42 km from Warsaw. The museum is dedicated to the life and work of its founder – father Maximilian Kolbe, evangelization activity of Niepokalanów, and the Franciscan missions throughout the world.

== Founding of the museum ==
The first museum dedicated to St. Maximilian (called Room of Remembrances) was located in the pre-war wooden chapel (from 1927 to 1929). When the chapel was restored to its original function (1998), the museum was moved to one of the old buildings of Niepokalanów, which previously housed a laundry and a carpenter's workshop. The exhibition, which spans three rooms, was created by the employees of the Museum of the town of Pabianice. At present, it is open to visitors every day from 8.00 to 17.00.

On 6 August 1998, two historical compartments of the museum were opened to the public by card. Józef Glemp, who expressed his hope that the new exhibition will be a good catechesis, showing the visitors a shortest path to God. A month later, on 20 September 1998, the museum was extended and a third compartment (missionary) was opened by Franciscan bishop Jan Wilk, working in Brazil mission.

== Exhibitions ==
In the first compartment, visitors are welcomed by the statue of St Maximilian, made of bronze by the Italian sculptor Roberto Joppolo of Viterbo. The statue was blessed by Pope John Paul II in October 1982 during the ceremony of canonization of St. Maximilian Kolbe.

In the second compartment, a visitor can see pre-war photographs and exhibits with explanations concerning the life and activities of the founder of Niepokalanów – St Maximilian – from his childhood, through youth, studies and Japan mission until building a large publishing monastery, called Niepokalanów. There is also a replica of his second room, where he lived from mid-1936 (after his return from Japan) until February 1941 (when he was arrested).

The third compartment presents collection from the Franciscan missions in the world, offered mostly by the missionaries working in Japan, Brazil, Zambia, Peru, Kenya or Tanzania. There are also memorabilia highlighting the posthumous fame and canonization of the martyr of the Auschwitz death camp. Furthermore, in 1986 one of the former prisoners of German concentration camps donated his striped camp uniform to the museum in Niepokalanów.

Among the objects drawing significant interest from visitors are dried piranhas, snake skins, and an intricately crafted Paschal candle and cross (gifts from the Gdańsk pilgrimage of sobriety communities). Two of the collected works have a particularly unusual origin: a portrait of St. Maximilian was crafted from pre-war postage stamps, while the image of Our Lady is woven from cereal grains.

== Photo gallery ==
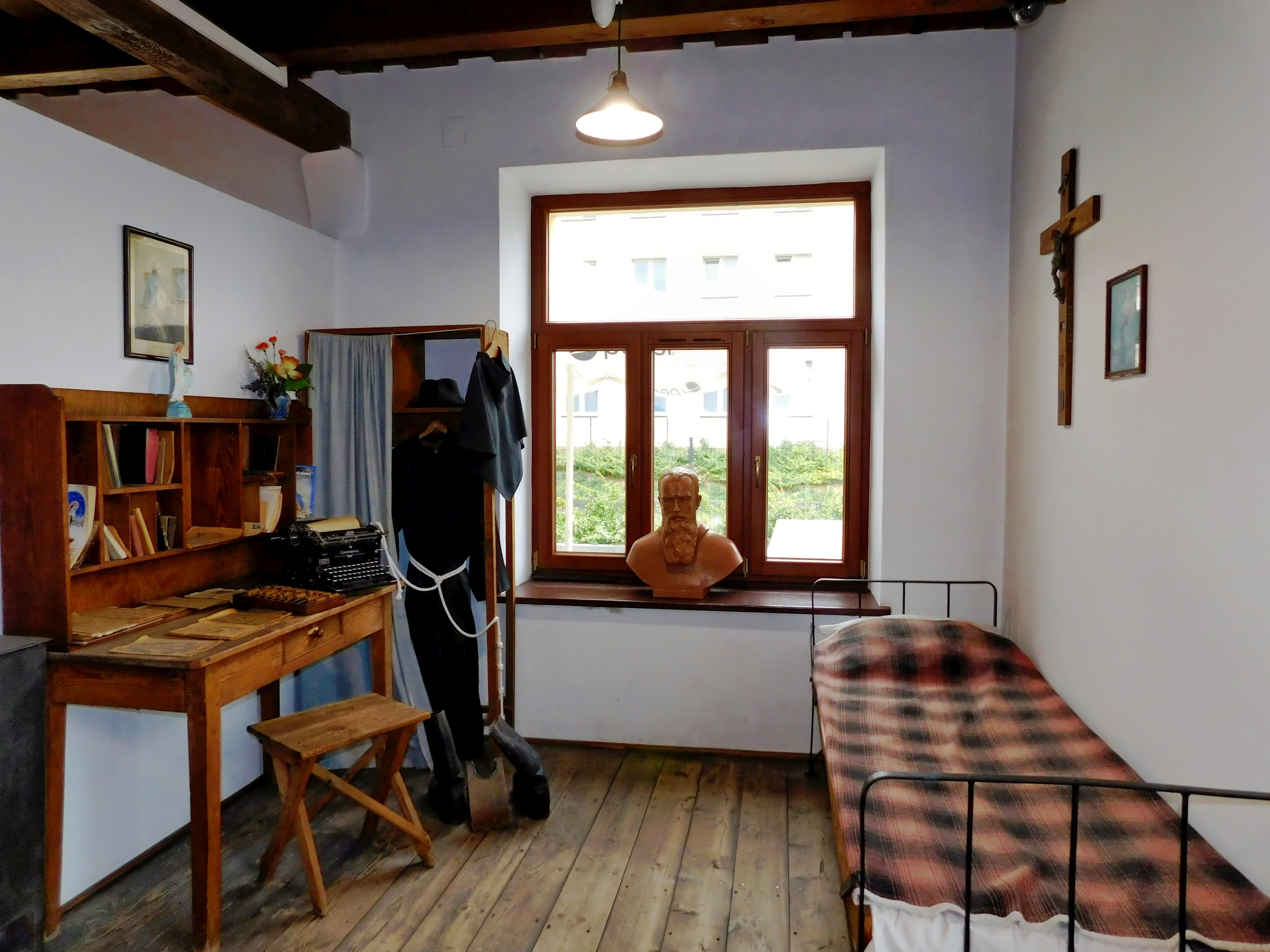
St Maximilian's flat (replica)

Everyday life of Niepokalanów

Pre-war machine for address labels

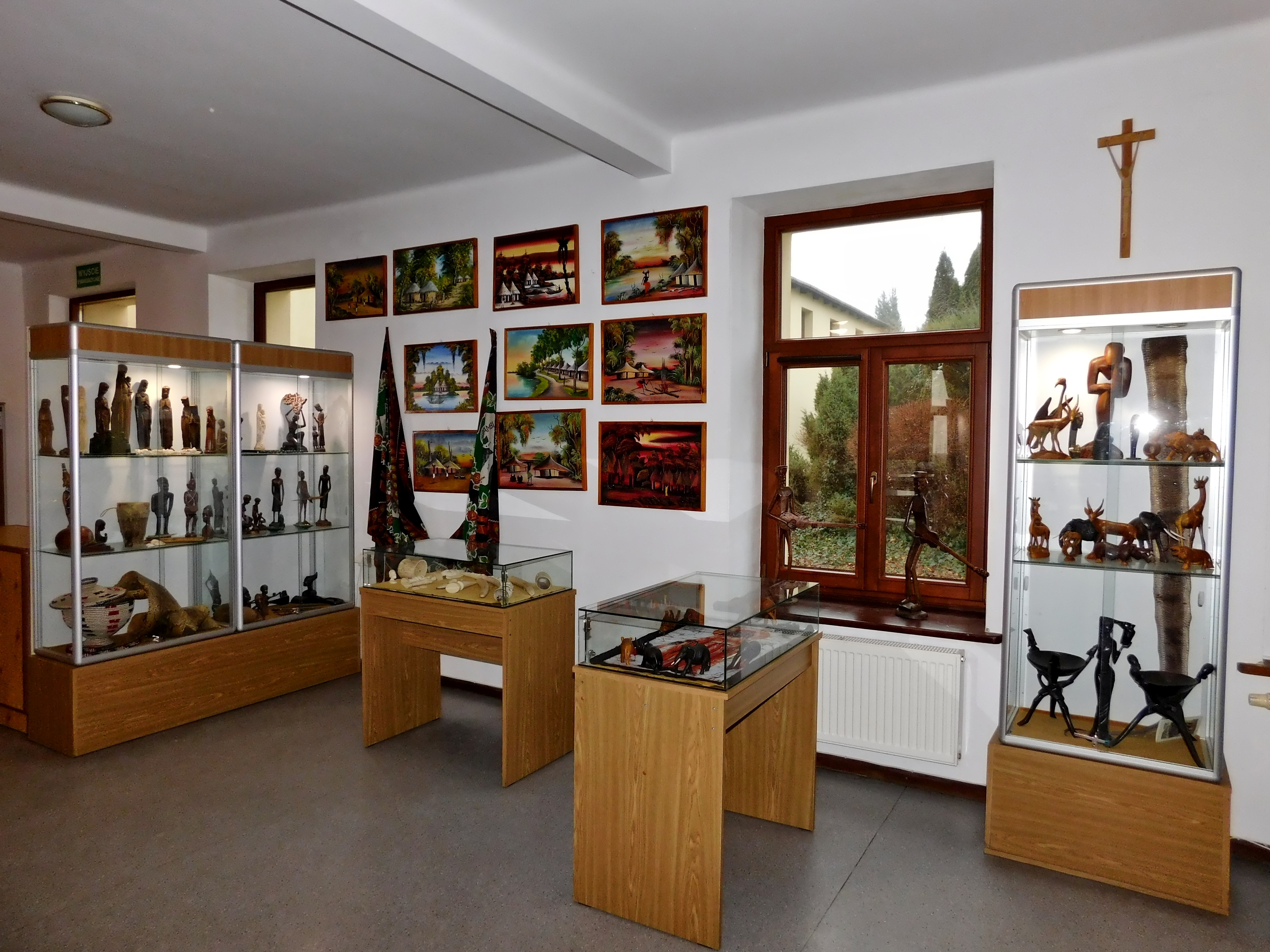
Compartment with African collection
