= Gmina Teresin =

Gmina Teresin Teresin Commune
- Gmina
- Coat of arms
- Interactive map of Gmina Teresin
- Coordinates (Teresin): 52°12′6″N 20°25′4″E
- Country: Poland
- Voivodeship: Masovian
- County: Sochaczew
- Seat: Teresin

Area
  - Total: 87.98 km^{2} (33.97 sq mi)

Population (2006)
  - Total: 11,028
  - Density: 125.3/km^{2} (324.6/sq mi)
- Website: http://www.teresin.pl

Gmina Teresin is a rural gmina (administrative district) in Sochaczew County, Masovian Voivodeship, in east-central Poland. Its seat is the village of Teresin, which lies approximately 13 kilometres (8 mi) south-east of Sochaczew and 41 km (25 mi) west of Warsaw.

The gmina covers an area of 87.98 square kilometres (34.0 sq mi), and as of 2006 its total population is 11,028.

== Villages ==
Gmina Teresin contains the villages and settlements of Budki Piaseckie, Dębówka, Elżbietów, Gaj, Granice, Izbiska, Kawęczyn, Lisice, Ludwików, Maszna, Maurycew, Mikołajew, Nowa Piasecznica, Nowe Gnatowice, Nowe Paski, Paprotnia, Pawłówek, Pawłowice, Seroki-Parcela, Seroki-Wieś, Skotniki, Skrzelew, Stare Paski, Strugi, Szymanów, Teresin, Teresin-Gaj, Topołowa and Witoldów.

== Neighbouring gminas ==
Gmina Teresin is bordered by the gminas of Baranów, Błonie, Kampinos, Leszno, Nowa Sucha, Sochaczew and Wiskitki.
