= Izbiska, Masovian Voivodeship =

Izbiska
- Village
- Location within Poland
- Coordinates: 52°14′1″N 20°26′25″E
- Country: Poland
- Voivodeship: Masovian
- County: Sochaczew
- Gmina: Teresin

Izbiska [izˈbiska] is a village in the administrative district of Gmina Teresin, within Sochaczew County, Masovian Voivodeship, in east-central Poland.
