= Paprotnia, Sochaczew County =

Paprotnia
- Village
- Location within Poland
- Coordinates: 52°13′N 20°26′E
- Country: Poland
- Voivodeship: Masovian
- County: Sochaczew
- Gmina: Teresin
- Population: 1,400

Paprotnia [paˈprɔtɲa] is a village in the administrative district of Gmina Teresin, within Sochaczew County, Masovian Voivodeship, in east-central Poland.

Area of Paprotnia, Sochaczew County	2.917 km^{2}
Population	2,022
Male Population	1,013 (50.1%)
Female Population	1,009 (49.9%)
Population change from 1975 to 2015	+24.7%
Population change from 2000 to 2015	-2.9%
Median Age	34.2 years
Male Median Age	34.4 years
Female Median Age	34 years
Timezone	Central European Summer Time
