= Nowa Piasecznica =

- Village
- Location within Poland
- Coordinates: 52°12′09″N 20°21′08″E
- Country: Poland
- Voivodeship: Masovian
- County: Sochaczew
- Gmina: Teresin

Nowa Piasecznica [ˈnɔva pjasɛt͡ʂˈnit͡sa] is a village in the administrative district of Gmina Teresin, within Sochaczew County, Masovian Voivodeship, in east-central Poland.
