= Pawłowice, Sochaczew County =

Pawłowice
- Village
- Location within Poland
- Coordinates: 52°13′40″N 20°28′2″E
- Country: Poland
- Voivodeship: Masovian
- County: Sochaczew
- Gmina: Teresin
- Population: 460

Pawłowice [pavwɔˈvit͡sɛ] is a village in the administrative district of Gmina Teresin, within Sochaczew County, Masovian Voivodeship, in east-central Poland.
