= Skotniki, Masovian Voivodeship =

Skotniki
- Village
- Location within Poland
- Coordinates: 52°10′19″N 20°19′12″E
- Country: Poland
- Voivodeship: Masovian
- County: Sochaczew
- Gmina: Teresin

Skotniki [skɔtˈniki] is a village in the administrative district of Gmina Teresin, within Sochaczew County, Masovian Voivodeship, in east-central Poland.
