= Teresin, Sochaczew County =

Teresin
- Village
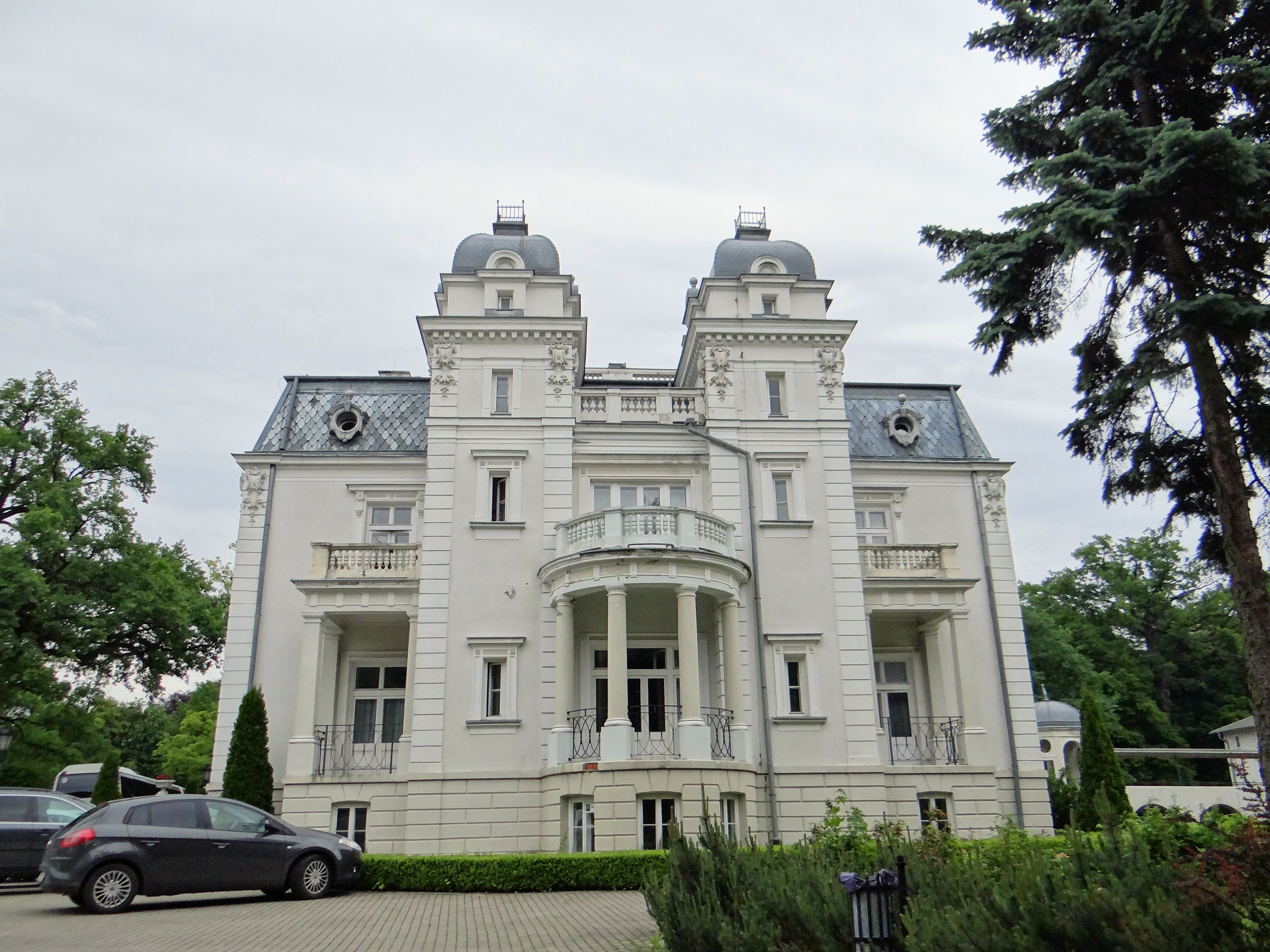
- Palace

- Location within Poland
- Coordinates: 52°12′6″N 20°25′4″E
- Country: Poland
- Voivodeship: Masovian
- County: Sochaczew
- Gmina: Teresin
- Population: 2,500

Teresin (Polish pronunciation: [tɛˈrɛɕin]) is a village in Sochaczew County, Masovian Voivodeship, in east-central Poland. It is the seat of the gmina (administrative district) called Gmina Teresin.
