= Ukrainian architecture =

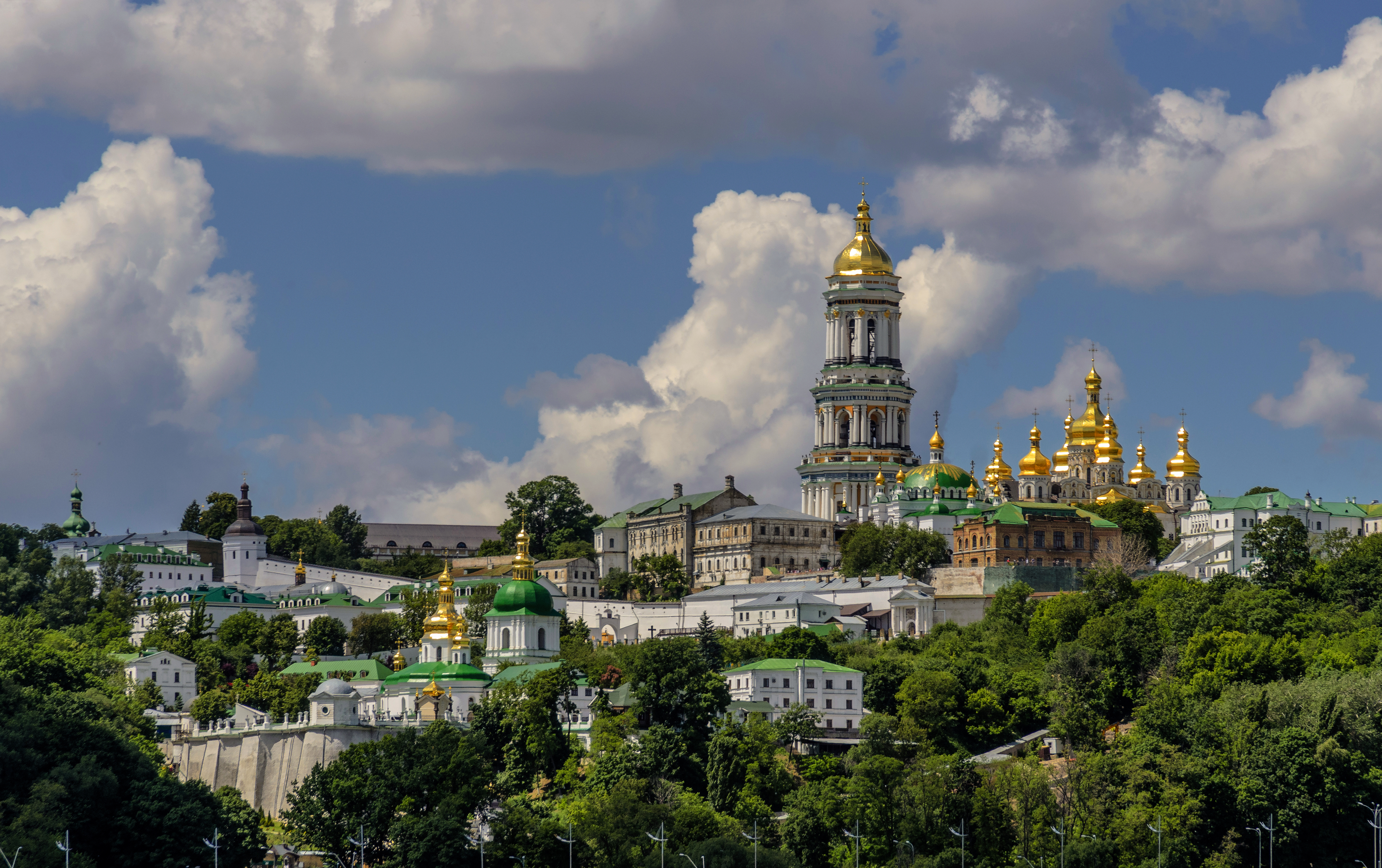
The Kyiv Pechersk Lavra (1051 onwards). Various structures within the complex date from different time periods. Their styles offer an insight into the history of Ukraine and the rich craftsmanship that was developed over the centuries.

Ukrainian architecture has initial roots in the Eastern Slavic state of Kievan Rus'. After the Mongol invasion of Kievan Rus', the distinct architectural history continued in the principalities of Galicia–Volhynia and later in the Grand Duchy of Lithuania. During the epoch of the Zaporozhian Cossacks, a style unique to Ukraine developed under the influences of the Polish–Lithuanian Commonwealth.

After the union with the Tsardom of Russia, architecture in Ukraine began to develop in different directions, with many structures in the larger eastern, Russian-ruled area built in the styles of Russian architecture of that period, whilst the western Galicia was developed under Austro-Hungarian architectural influences, in both cases producing fine examples. Despite this, Ukrainian national motifs would continue to be used and have seen a resurgence starting from the early 20th century, during some periods of the Soviet era and in modern independent Ukraine.

== History ==
=== Ancient era ===
First monuments of stone architecture in the territory of modern Ukraine stem from the Antiquity. Stating from the 8th century BC, numerous Greek colonies appeared on the northern Black Sea coast, the most prominent among them being Tyras (modern-day Bilhorod-Dnistrovskyi), Olbia, Chersonesus, Theodosia, Panticapaeum (now Kerch) and others. Initially the architecture of those settlements was strongly influenced by the building traditions of Ionia, from which many of the colonists stemmed, but starting from the 5th century BC Athenian influence became obvious in the region. During the first centuries of the new era Hellenistic architecture became widespread in the Pontic area. Among valuable structures preserved from the era of Greek colonization in modern-day Ukraine are ruins of defensive walls, residential houses and temples, elements of columns.

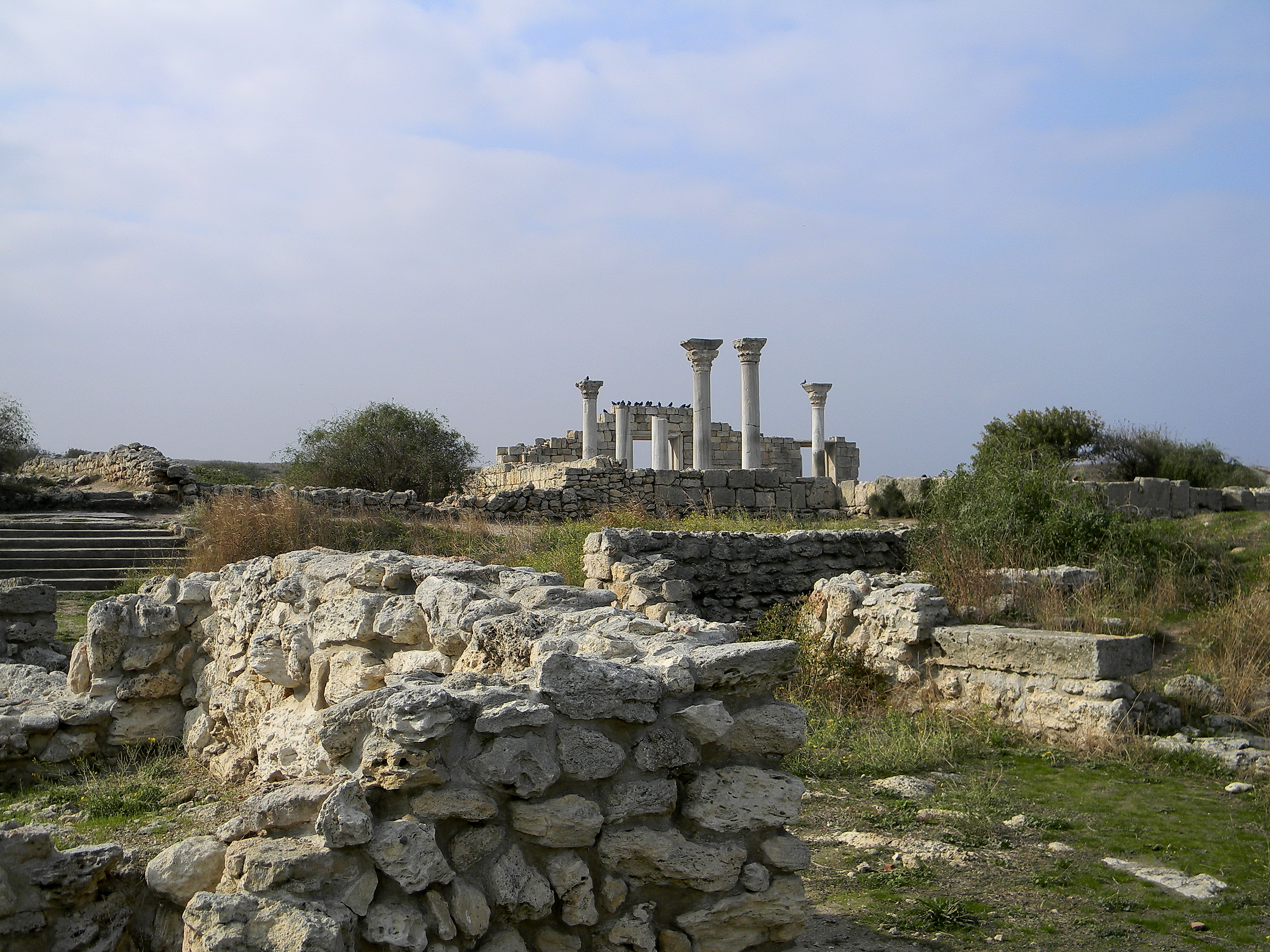
The ruins of the Greek colony in Chersonesus, Crimea (c. 5th century BC)

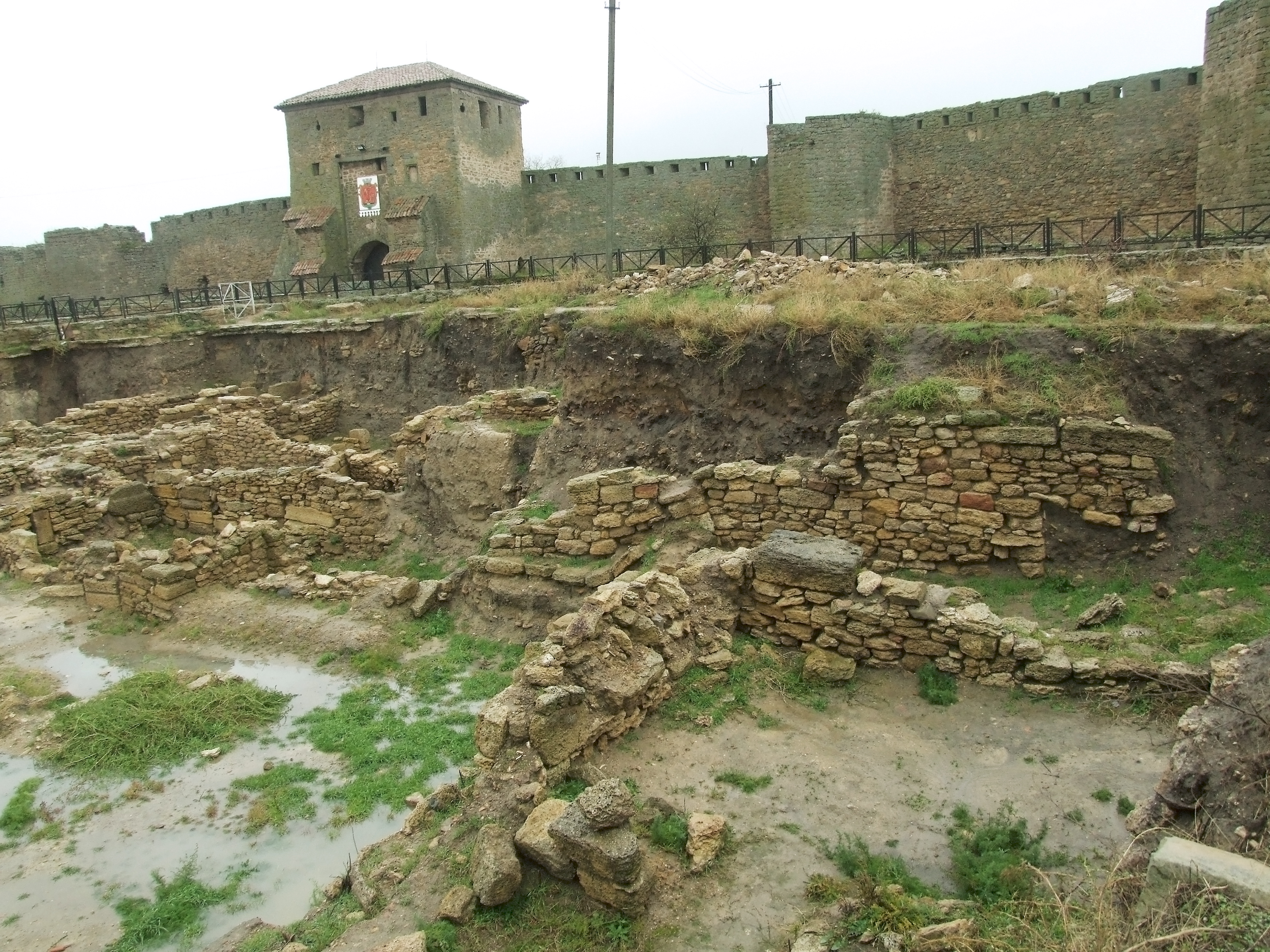
Remains of Tyras, positioned on the northern coast of the Black Sea (c. 600 BC)

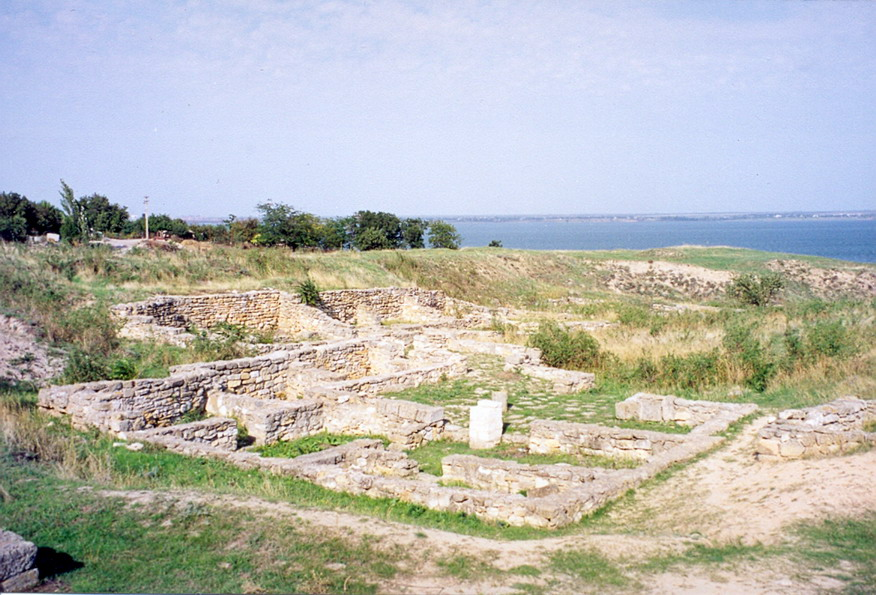
Pontic Olbia (7th century BC), located at the estuary of the Southern Bug

=== Early Middle Ages and Medieval Rus' (988–1240) ===
Following significant destruction during the Migration Period, the architecture of Greek colonies on the Black Sea was revived during the Byzantine era. Significant objects constructed during that time were early Christian churches, many of which utilized elements of previously ruined ancient buildings. The centre of temple architecture in Late Antiquity and early Middle Ages was Chersonesos. Many Christian churches of the earliest period (4th–7th centuries AD) had a characteristic cruciform ground plan, influenced by Middle Eastern architecture, but rotundas were also widespread. In the 7th–9th centuries basilicas of Roman type appeared. Intermediate forms were also represented in church architecture of that time. The best-preserved monument of Byzantine architecture in Crimea is the 8th-century Church of St. John the Baptist in Kerch.

The medieval state of Kievan Rus' was the predecessor of modern states of Ukraine, Russia, and Belarus and their respective cultures, including architecture.

Church architecture of Rus' predated the adoption of Christianity in 988, and Christian temples in Kyiv are mentioned as early as 945. Early Eastern Orthodox churches were mainly made of wood, with the simplest form becoming known as a cell church. The architectural style of the Kievan state was strongly influenced by the Byzantine architecture, and Greek masters were invited to build the first stone churches in the region by prince Volodymyr, but influences of Western European Romanesque architecture were also present. Major cathedrals often featured scores of small domes, which led some art historians to take this as an indication of the appearance of pre-Christian pagan Slavic temples. Although early Kievan Rus' architecture had a common style, it eventually diverged into a number of local varieties.

The main styles found on the territory of Ukraine are the Kyiv–Chernihiv, Galician, Pereiaslav, and Volhynian schools of architecture. Among prominent structures known from the Rus' era in Kyiv are Church of the Tithes (986–996), St. Sophia Cathedral (1017–1037), Golden Gate (c. 1018–1037), St. Michael's Golden-Domed Monastery (1108), Three Hierarchs Church (12th century), Church of the Dormition (1132), St. Cyril's Church (1140), Church of the Saviour at Berestove (12th century), Dormition Cathedral (1073) and Gate Church of the Trinity (1108) in Kyiv Pechersk Lavra, and Saint Michael's Сhurch within Vydubychi Monastery (1088). Many of these churches survive to this day, however, in the course of the 16th–18th centuries, some of them were externally rebuilt in the Ukrainian Baroque style. Examples include the grand Saint Sophia Cathedral, Church of the Saviour at Berestove, and the St. Cyril's Church. The Golden Gate in Kyiv, built in 1037, was reconstructed in 1982, but its new design was dismissed by some art and architecture historians as a revivalist fantasy.

In Chernihiv the architecture of the Rus' era is represented by several church buildings: Transfiguration Cathedral (1024–1036), Cathedral of Sts. Boris and Gleb (1120–1123), St. Elijah's Church (1078), Dormition Cathedral of Yelets Monastery (1060), and St. Paraskeva's Church (12th century, reconstruction done in the late 1940s). Partially preserved medieval structures can also be found in several locations around Kyiv and Chernihiv, such as Oster and Bilohorodka. In Kaniv the St. George's Church built in the 1140s has been preserved in a partially reconstructed form. In Northern and Western Ukraine prominent buildings from the Rus' era are represented by such examples as the Saint Basil Church in Ovruch (built in 1190 and reconstructed in 1907–1909), Dormition Cathedral in Volodymyr (built in 1160, reconstructed in 1896–1900), and Saint Pantaleon Church near Halych (built around 1200, reconstructed in 1998). In Halych and the surrounding areas, foundations of numerous churches have been discovered, including the ruins of the Dormition Cathedral in Krylos built by prince Yaroslav Osmomysl. Rus' architecture of Halych lands is signified by an obvious Romanesque influence, which can also be seen in Chernihiv, but is less prominent in Kyiv.

Little secular or vernacular architecture of Kievan Rus' has survived.

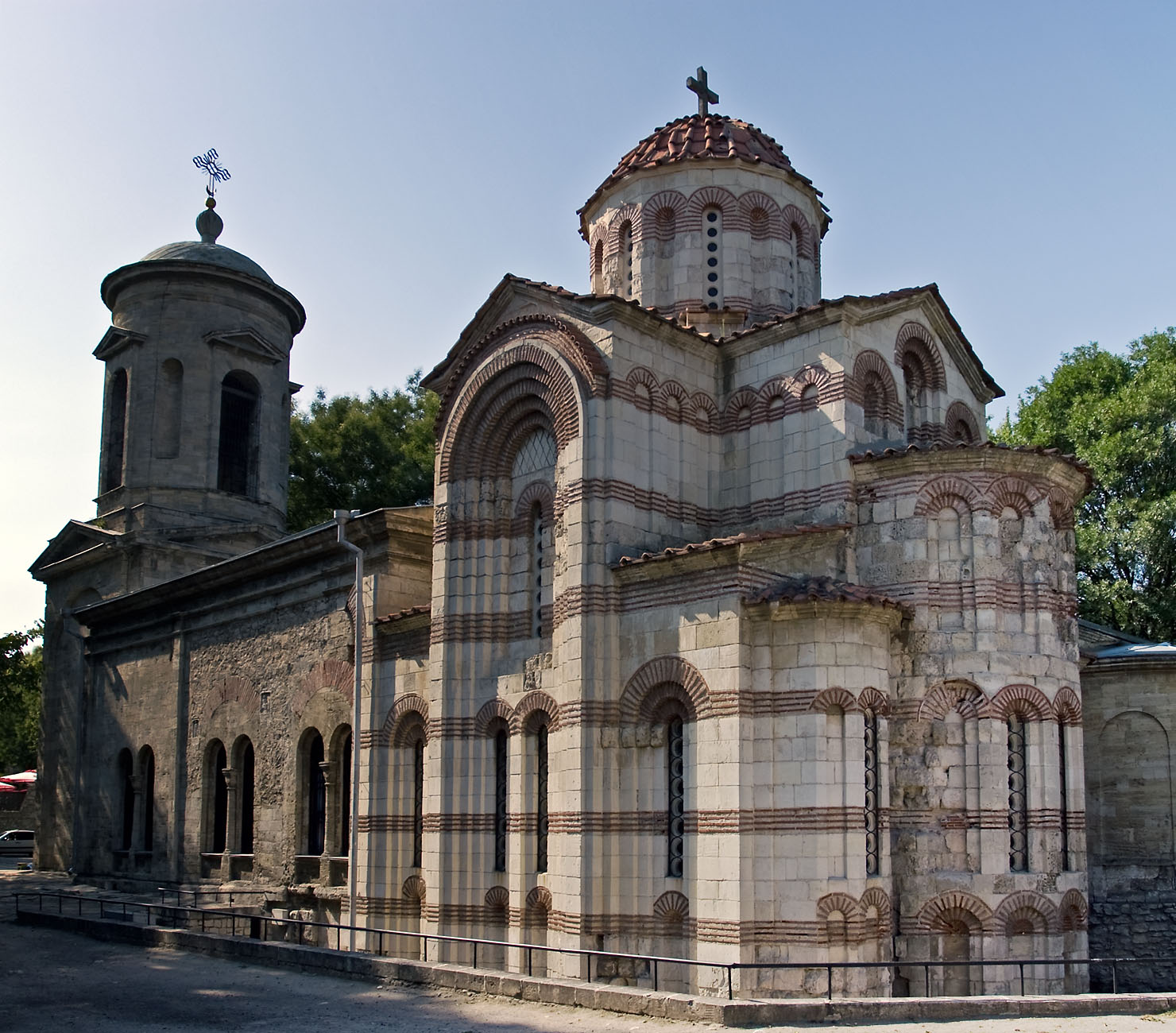
Church of St. John the Baptist in Kerch, Crimea (10th century)

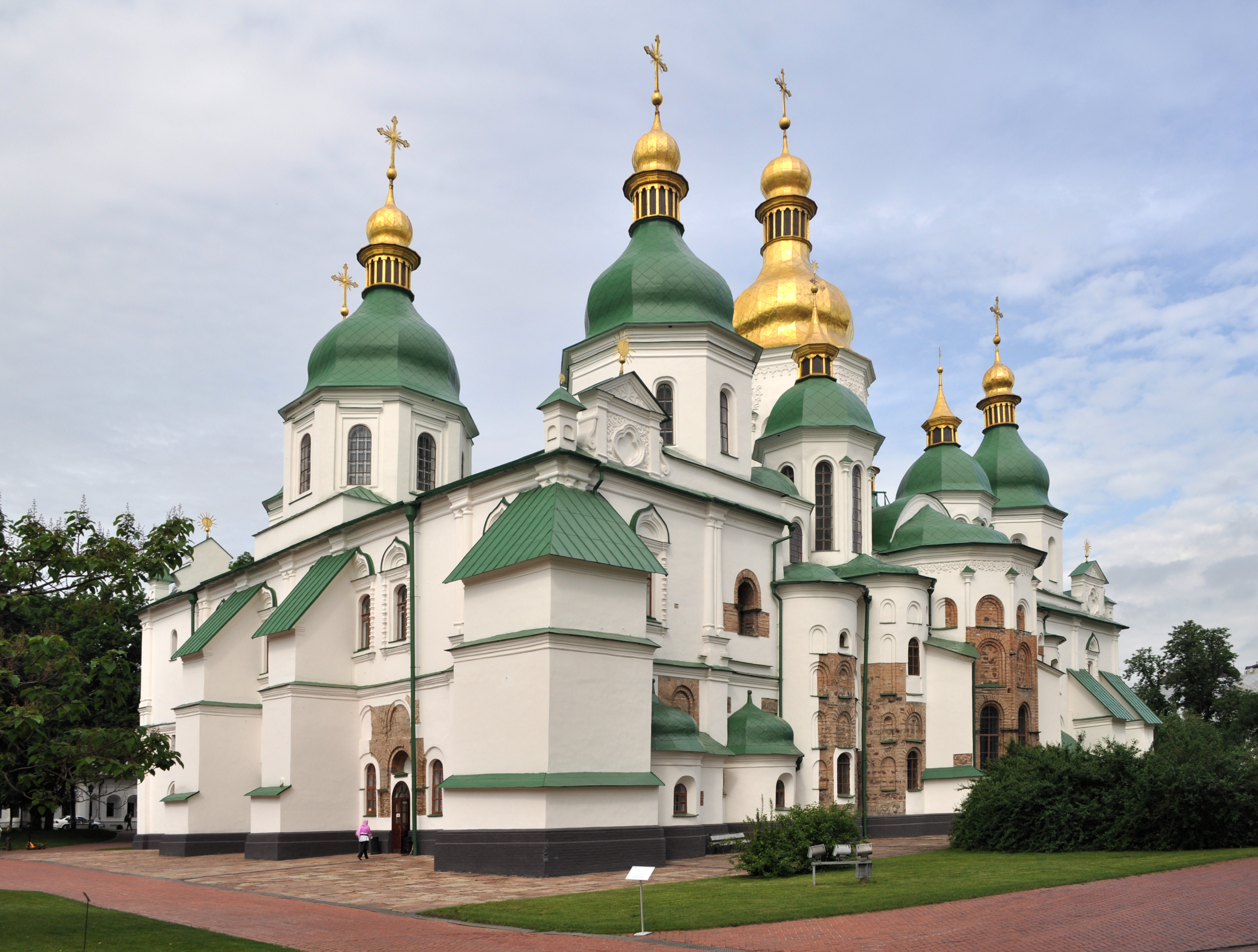
Saint Sophia's Cathedral, Kyiv (early 11th century)

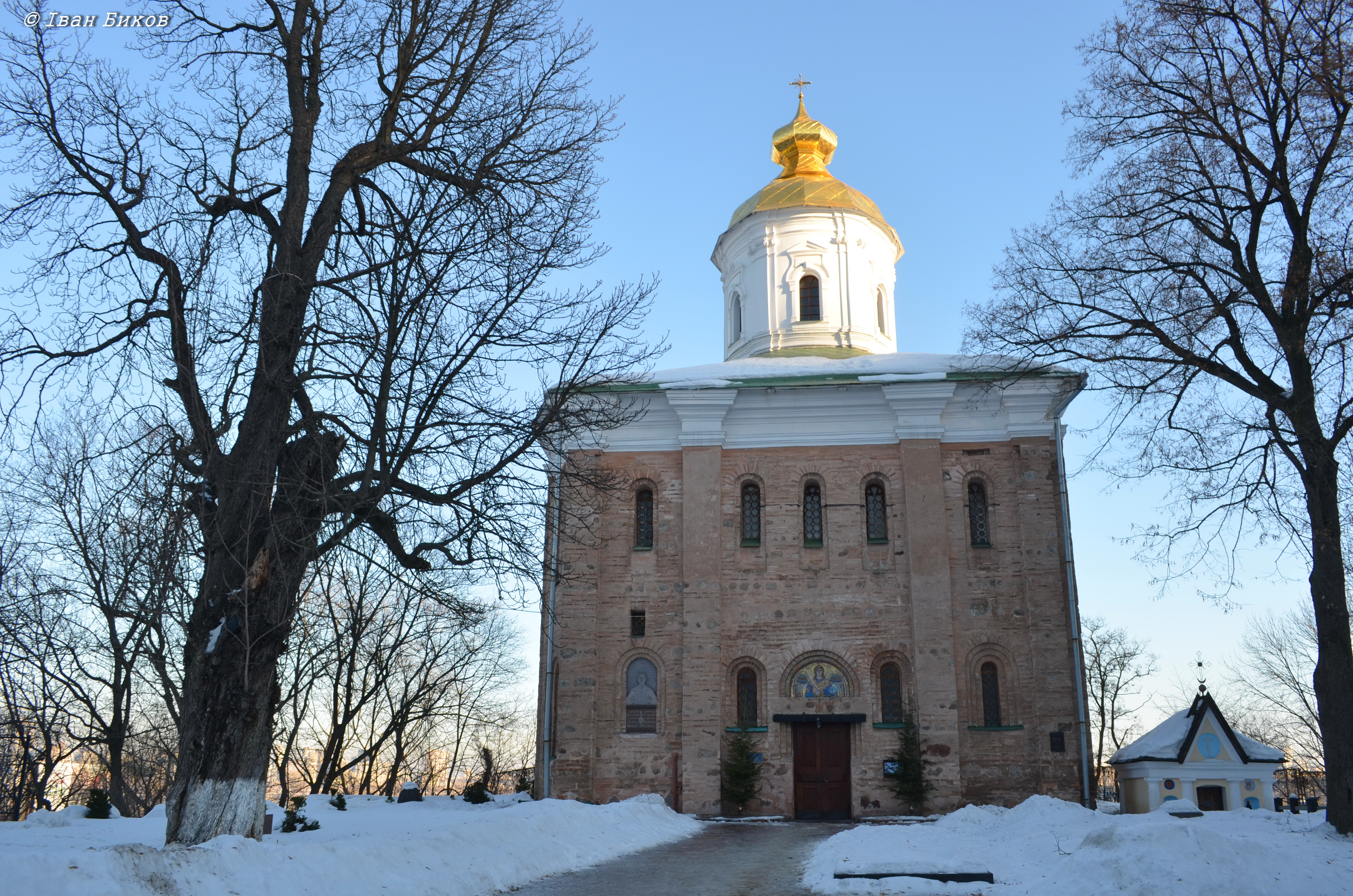
Saint Michael's Сhurch, Kyiv (1070–1088)

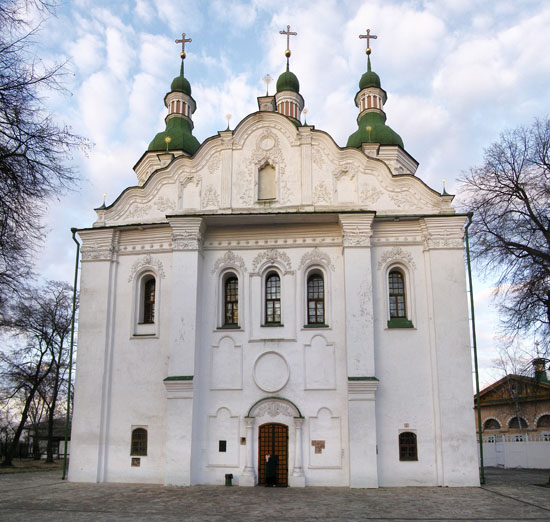
St. Cyril's Church, Kyiv (1140)

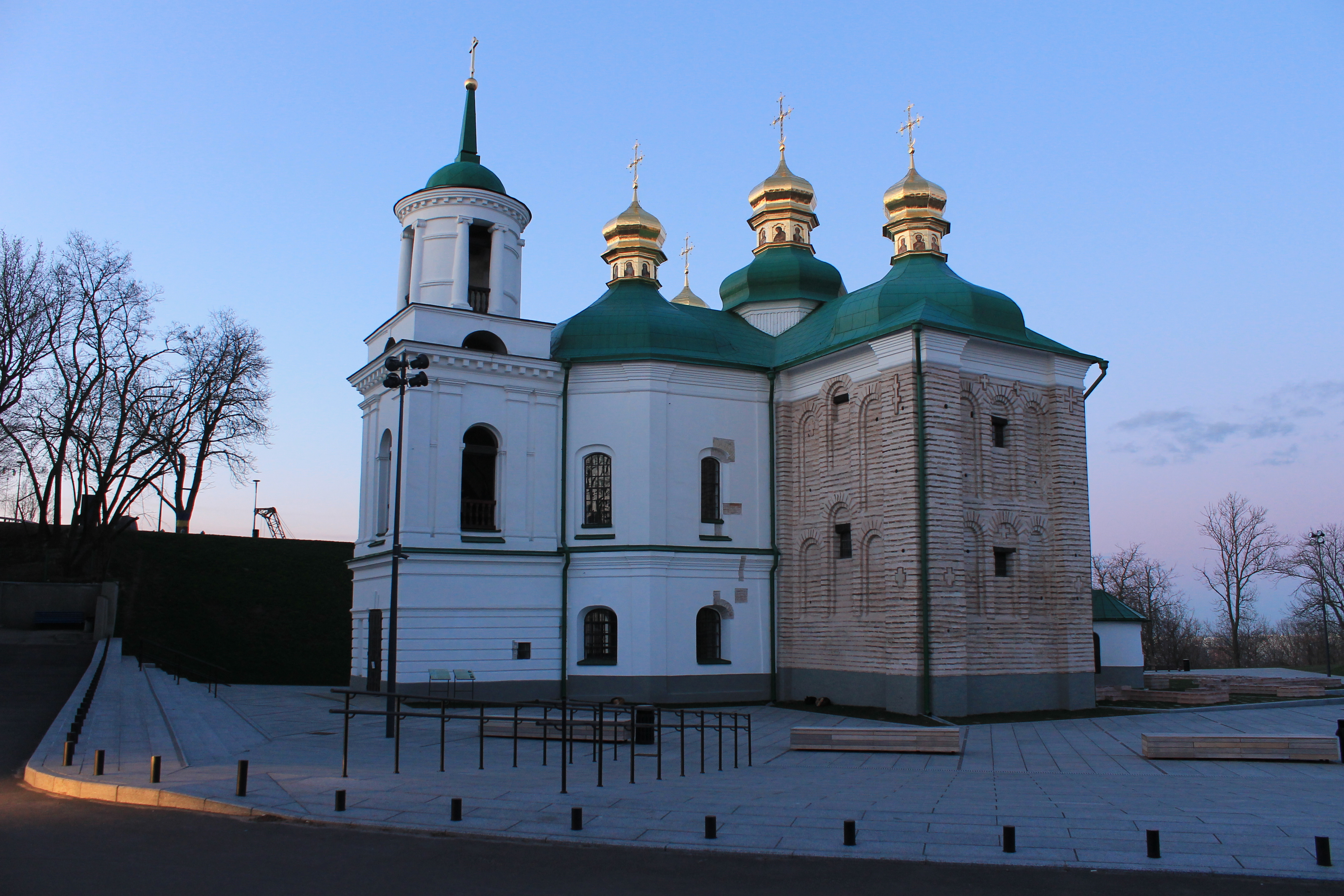
Church of the Saviour at Berestove (12th century)

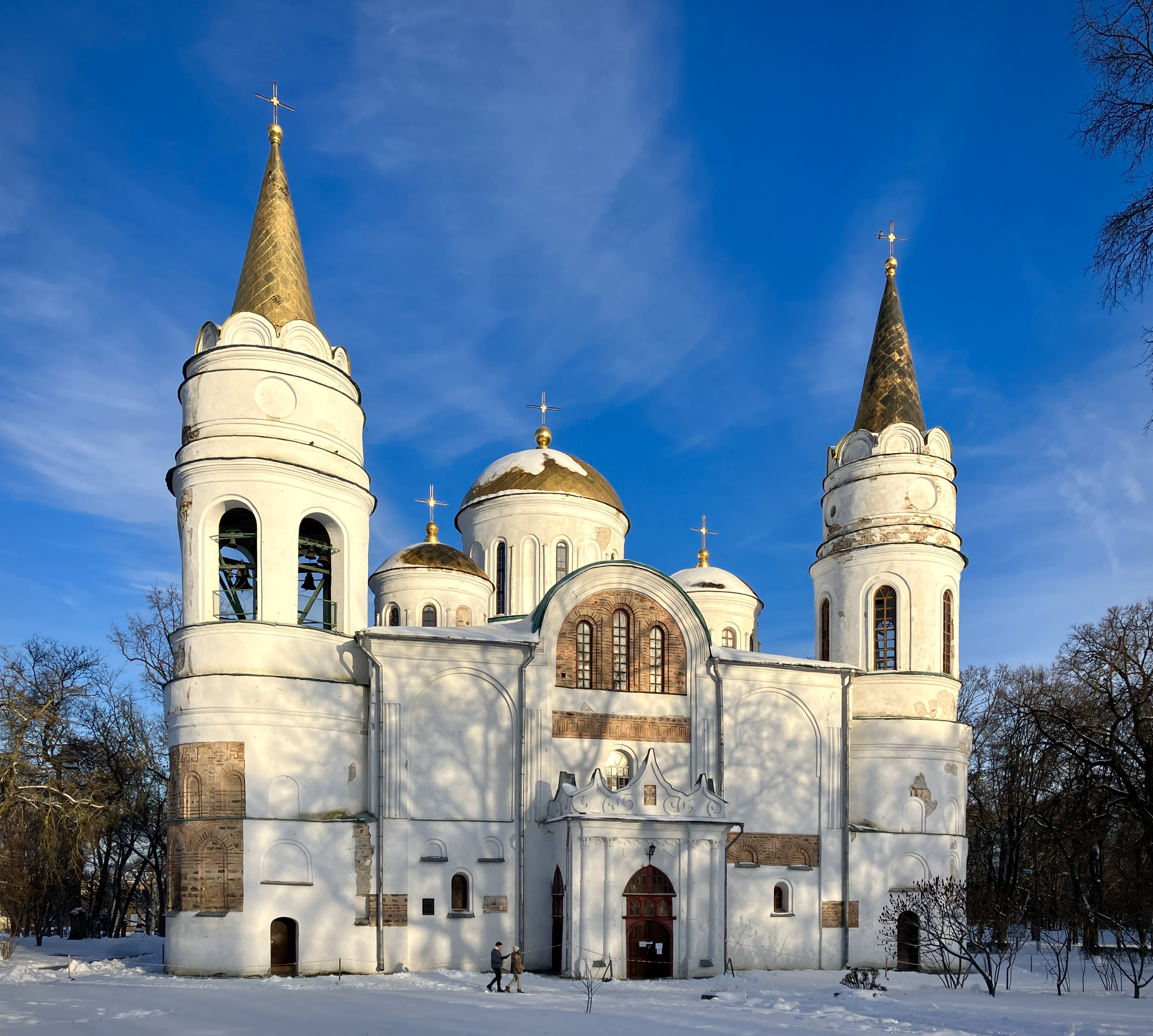
Transfiguration Cathedral, Chernihiv (1024-1036)

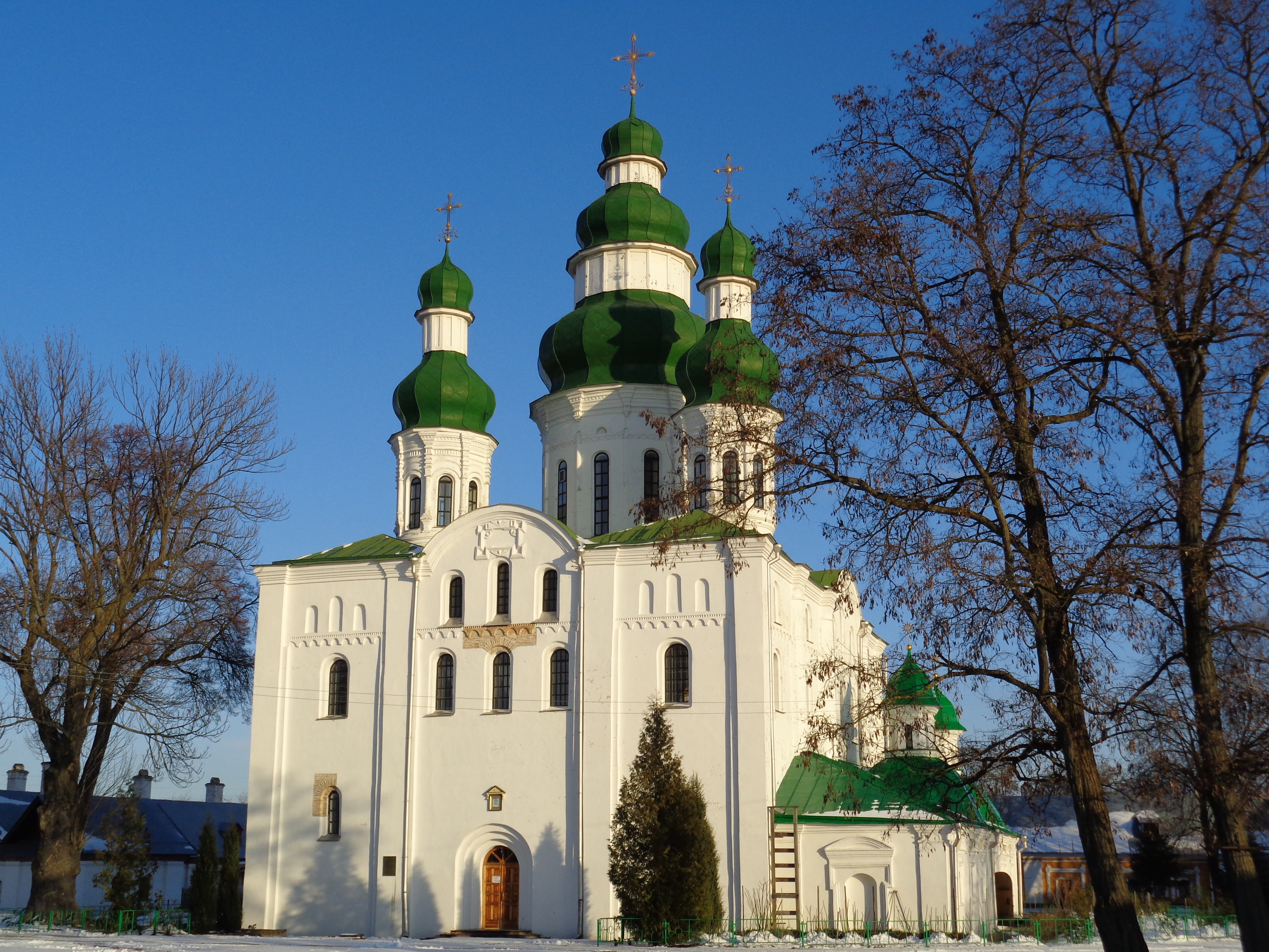
Dormition Cathedral of Yelets Monastery, Chernihiv (1060)

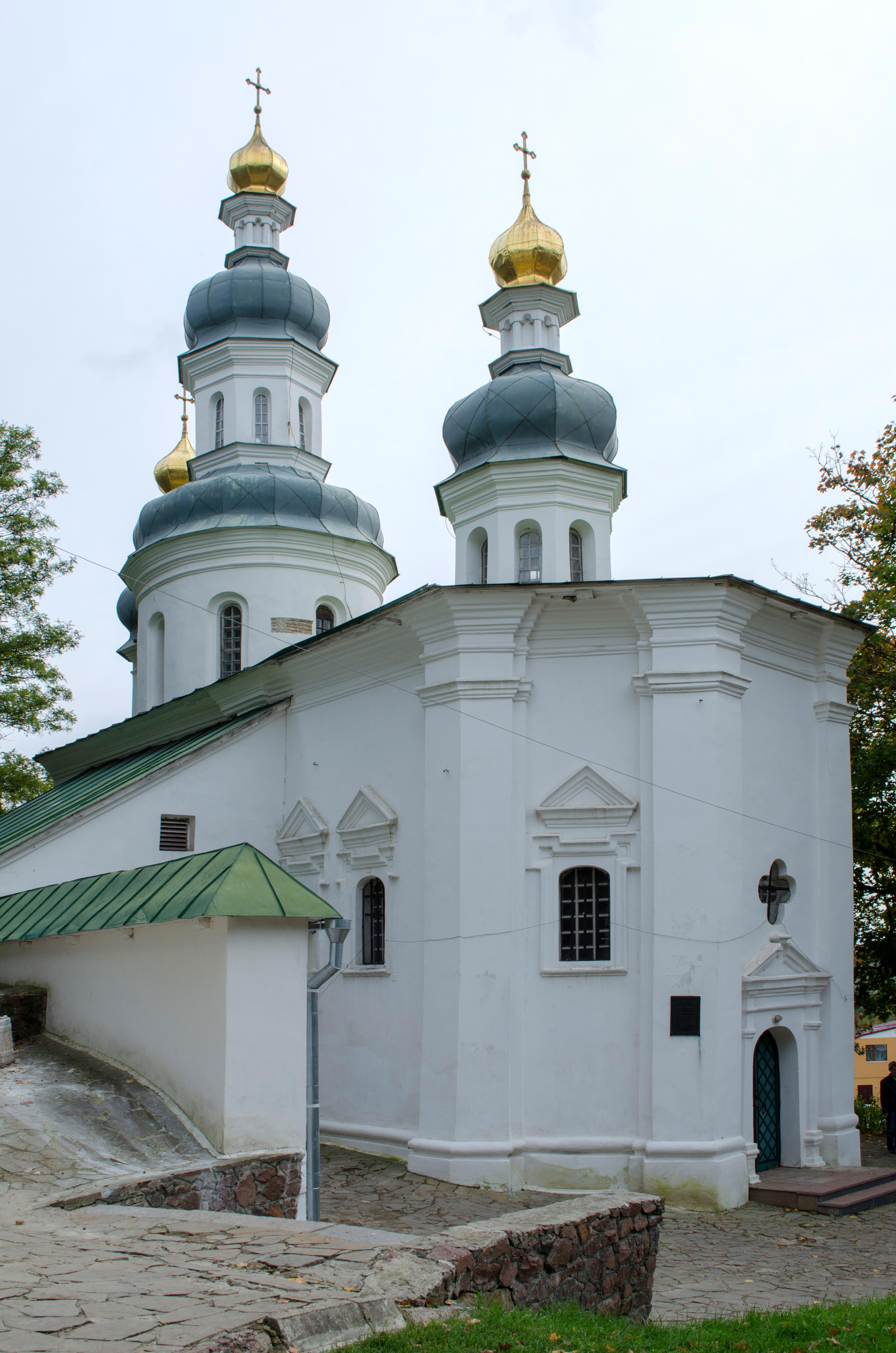
St. Elijah's Church, Chernihiv (1078)

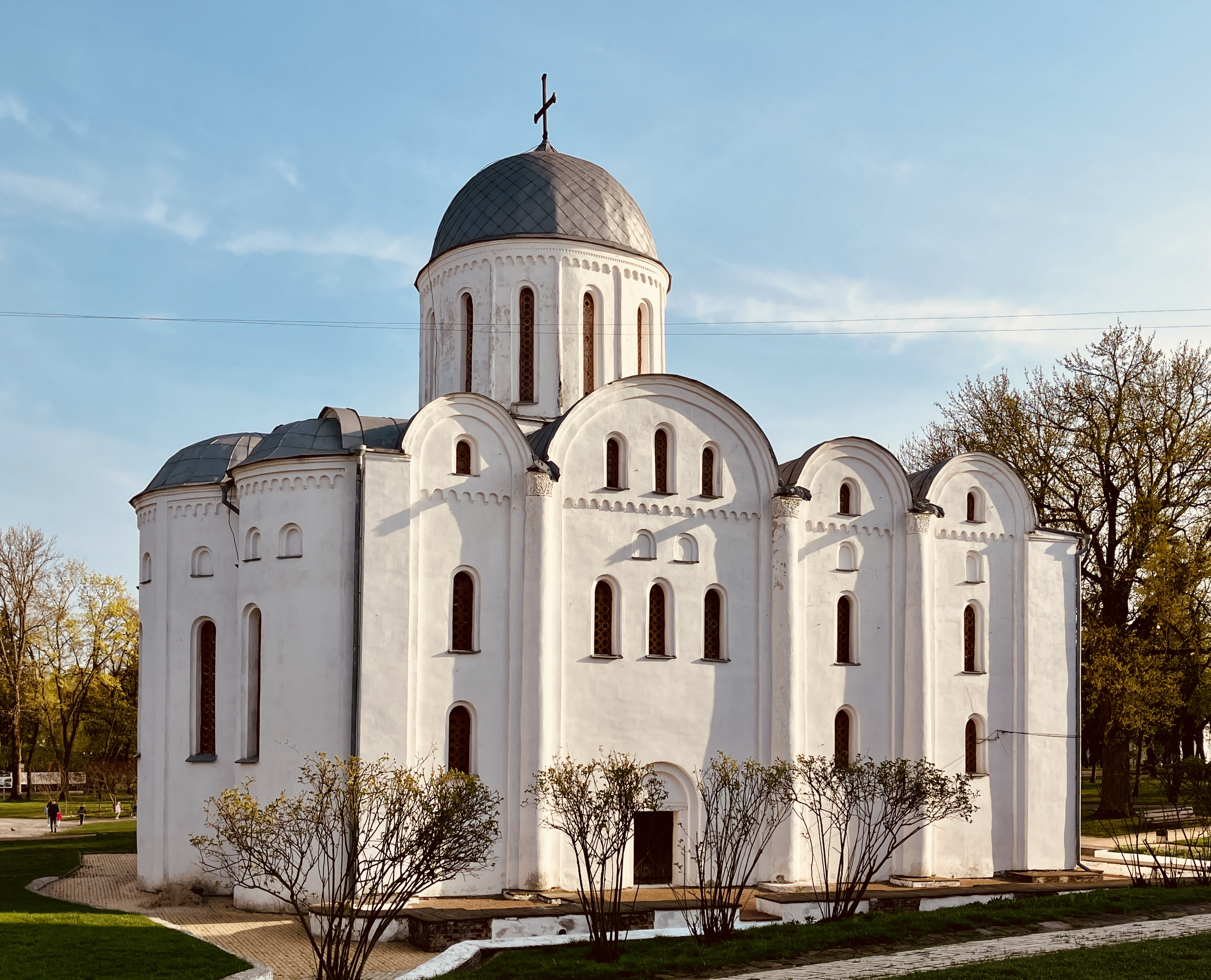
Sts. Boris and Gleb Cathedral, Chernihiv (1120-1123)

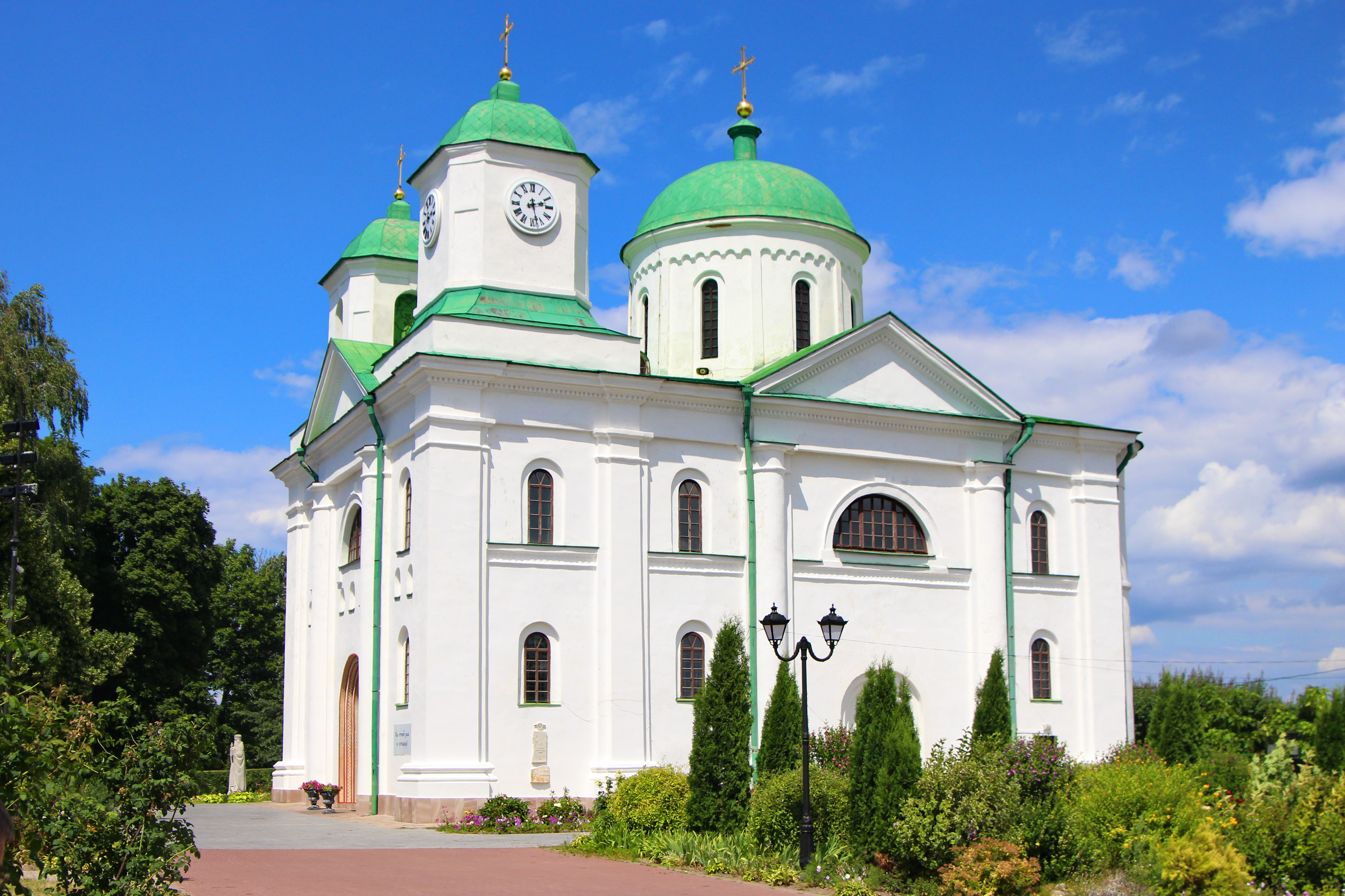
St. George's Cathedral, Kaniv (1140s)

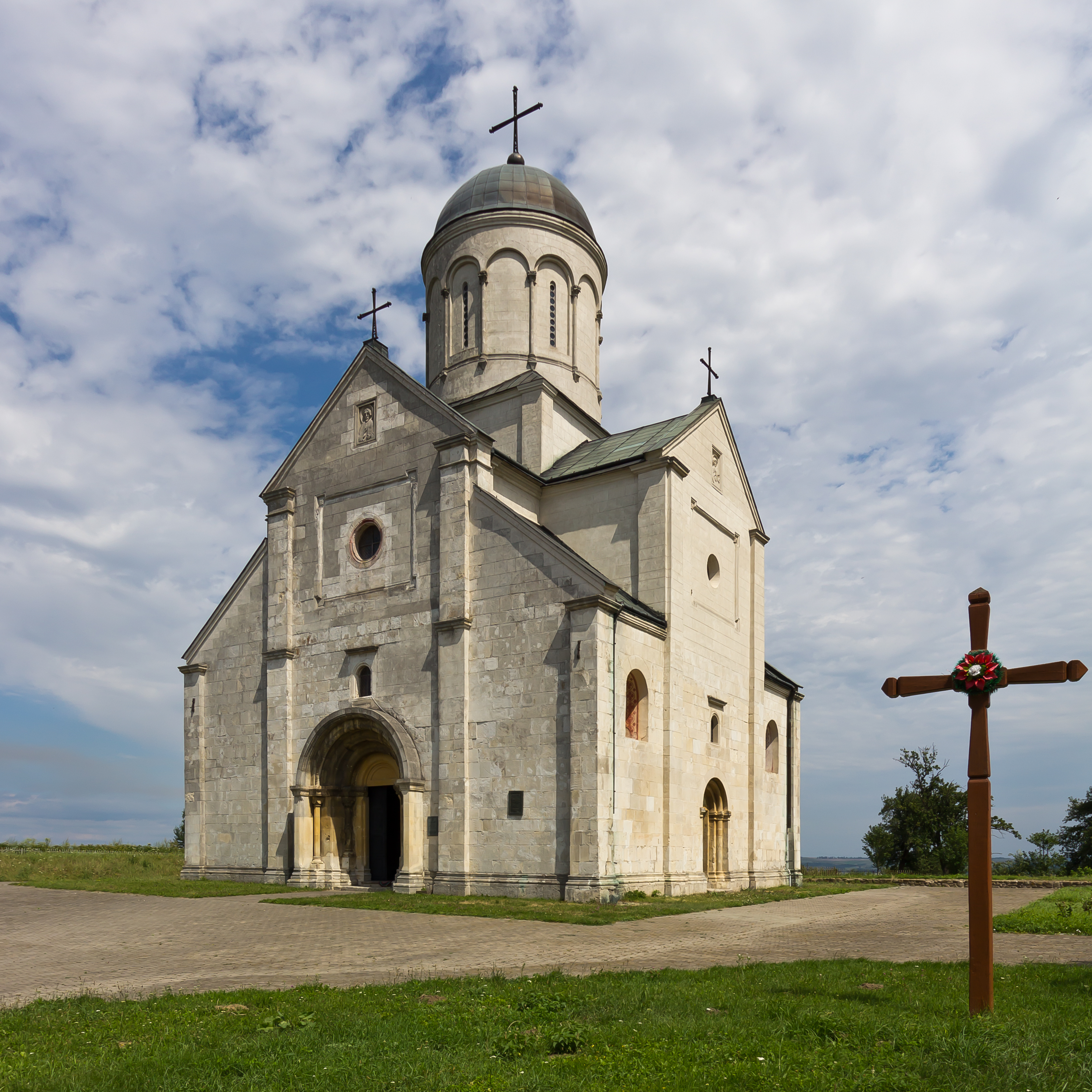
St. Pantaleon Church, Shevchenkove (1194)

=== Late Medieval Era ===
During the 13th and 14th centuries construction works in the lands of present-day Ukraine were limited almost exclusively to westernmost regions. As a result, only a few monuments of Gothic architecture are present in Ukrainian lands. Some Gothic elements can be found in the Armenian Cathedral of Lviv (1363), Nativity Church in Halych (late 14th century), Church of St. Nicholas in Lviv (14th century) and Mezhyrich Monastery in Volhynia (15th century). The biggest Gothic building Ukraine is the Latin Cathedral in Lviv (late 14th century). In the 15th–16th centuries a revived Byzantine style spread around Bukovyna, Galicia, Podolia and Bessarabia, represented among others by churches in Lavriv, Kamianets-Podilskyi, Zinkiv and Mohyliv-Podilskyi.

Constant wars and new colonial policy of the szlachta led to the active development of castles and fortifications, which started in the 14th–15th centuries. One of the most active figures in this sphere was Fedor Koriatovych, ruler of the Duchy of Podolia. Among major fortifications which emerged during that time are the castles in Zinkiv, Sataniv, Medzhybizh (Podolia), Khotyn (Bessarabia), Pniv, Terebovlia (Galicia), Ostroh, Lutsk, Kremenets (Volhynia), Mukachevo (Transcarpathia) and others. A unique monument is the fortified Holy Intercession Church in the Podolian village of Sutkivtsi (1476).

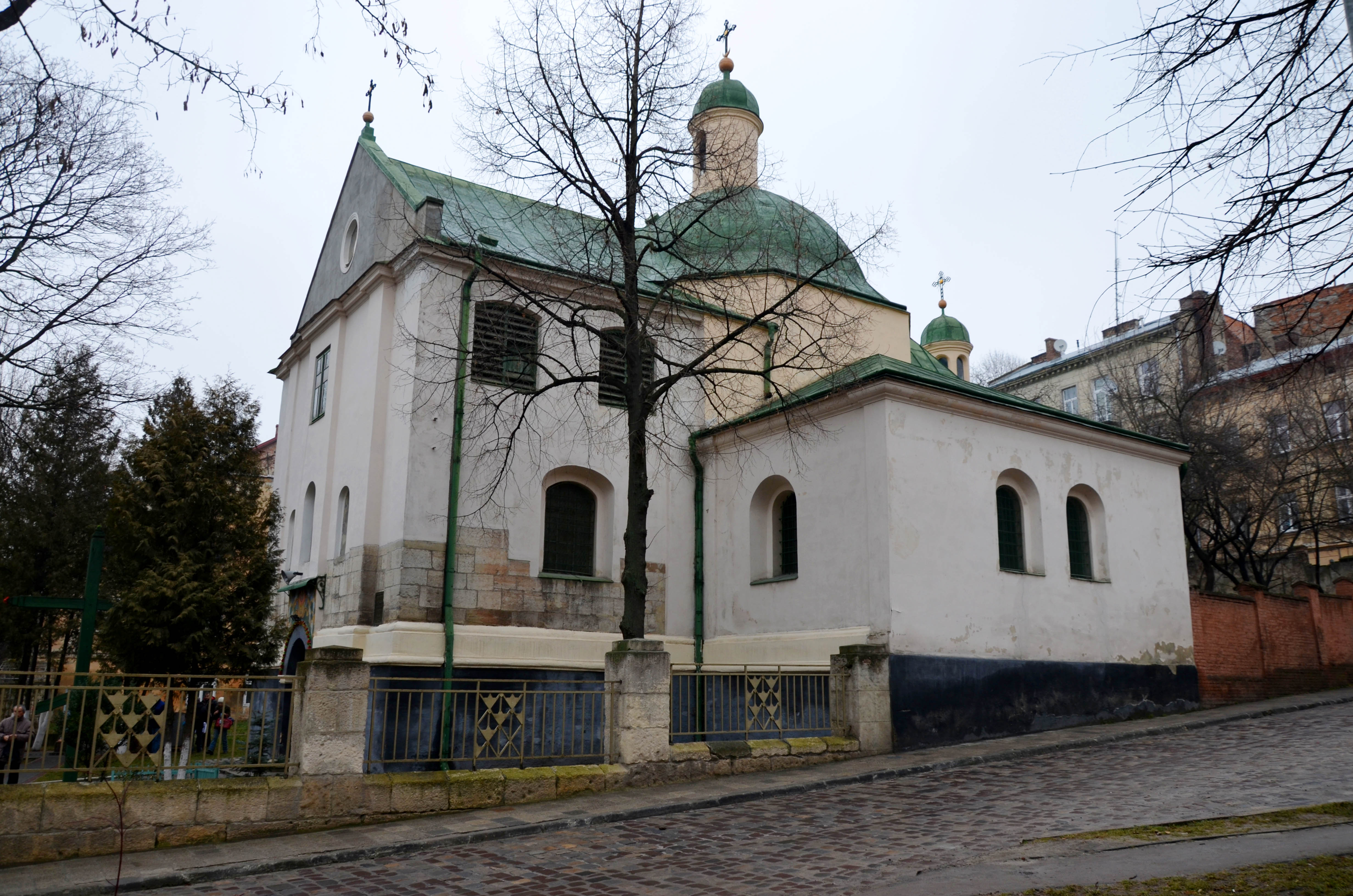
St. Nicholas Church, Lviv (13-14th centuries)

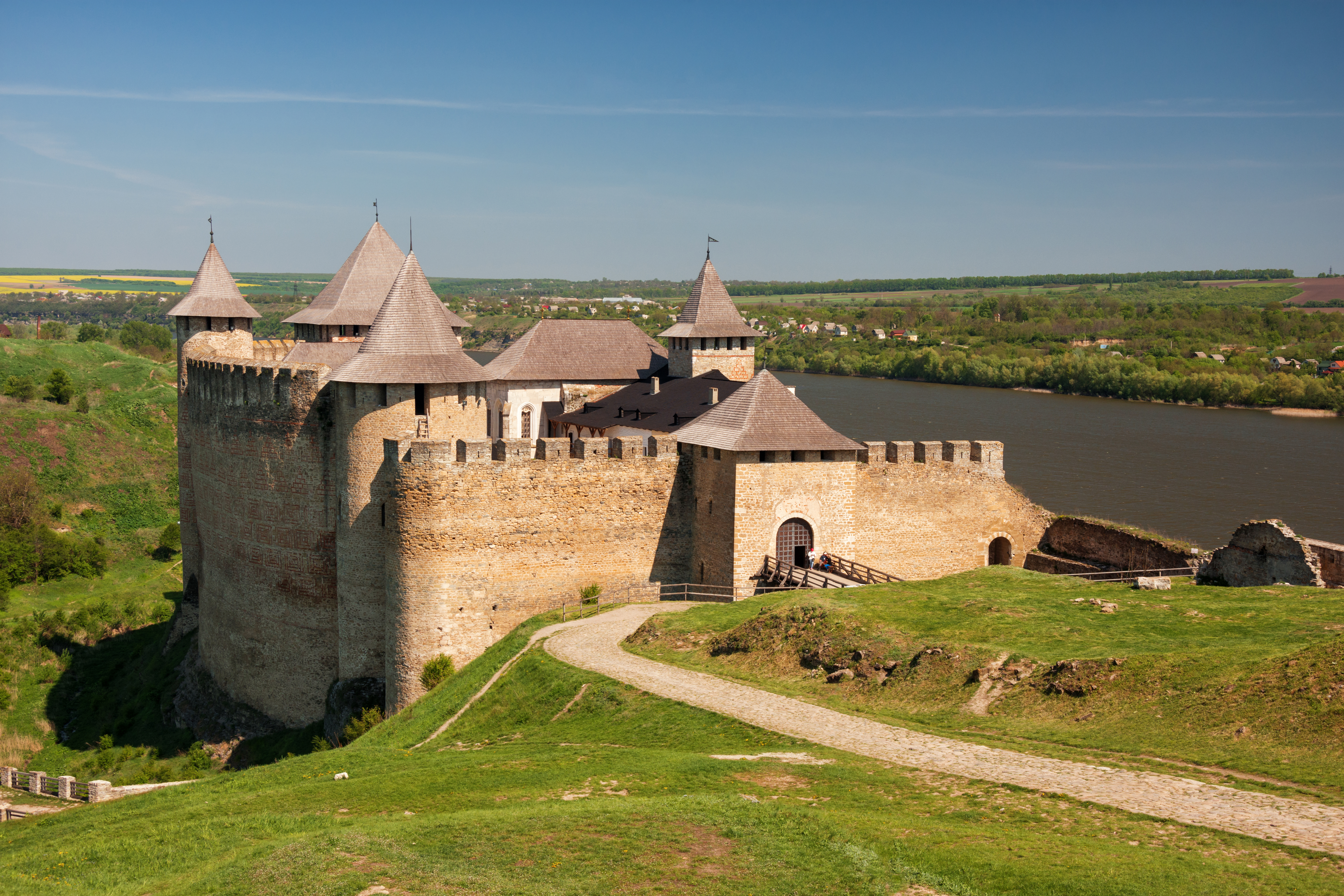
Khotyn Fortress (13-15th centuries)

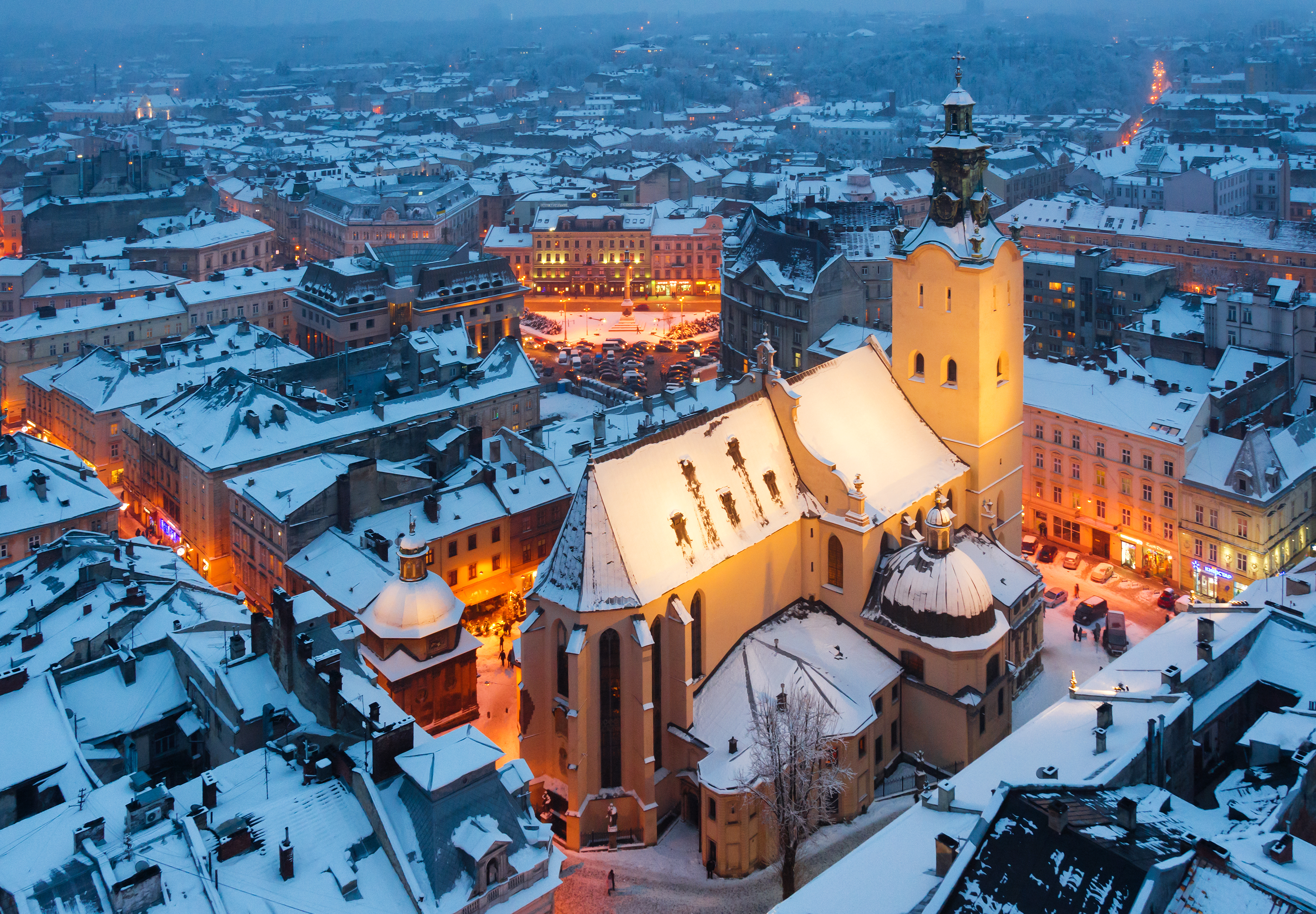
Latin Cathedral, Lviv (1360-1481)

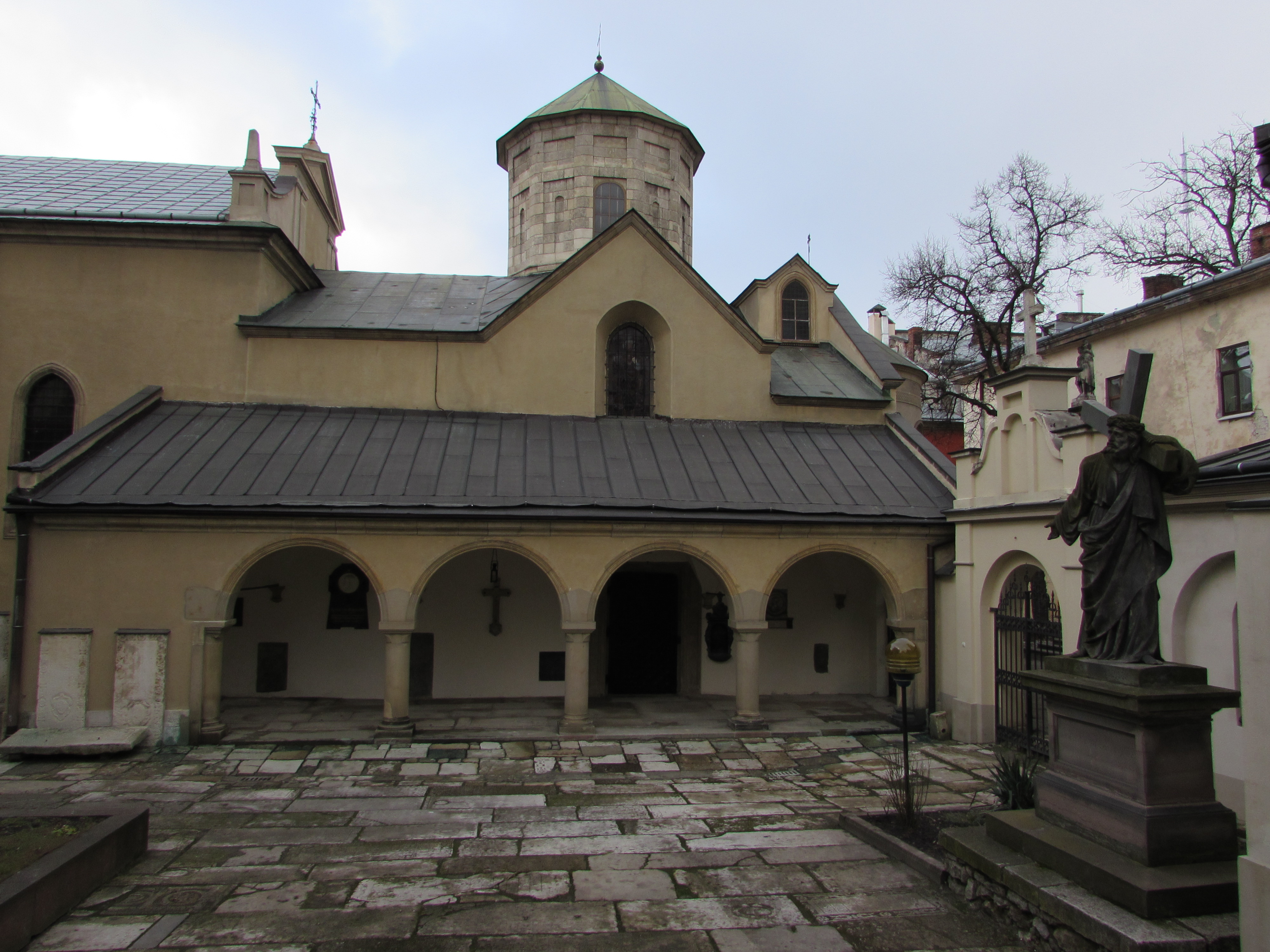
Armenian Cathedral, Lviv (1363-1370)

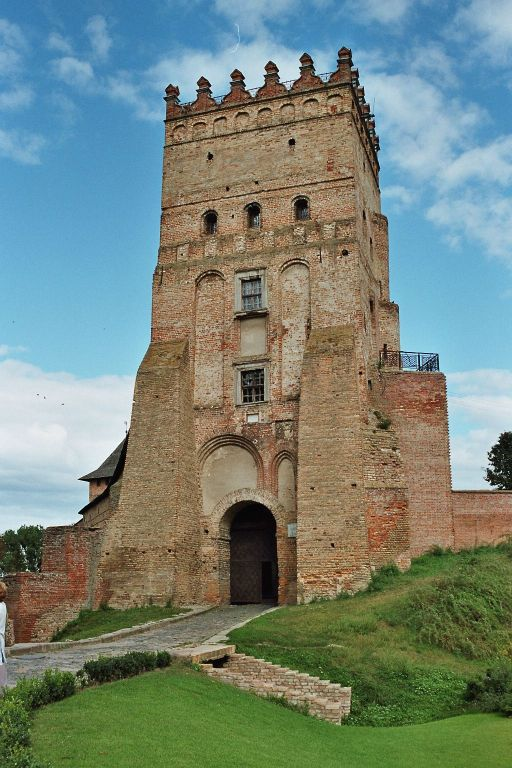
Gate tower of Lutsk Castle (14-16th centuries)

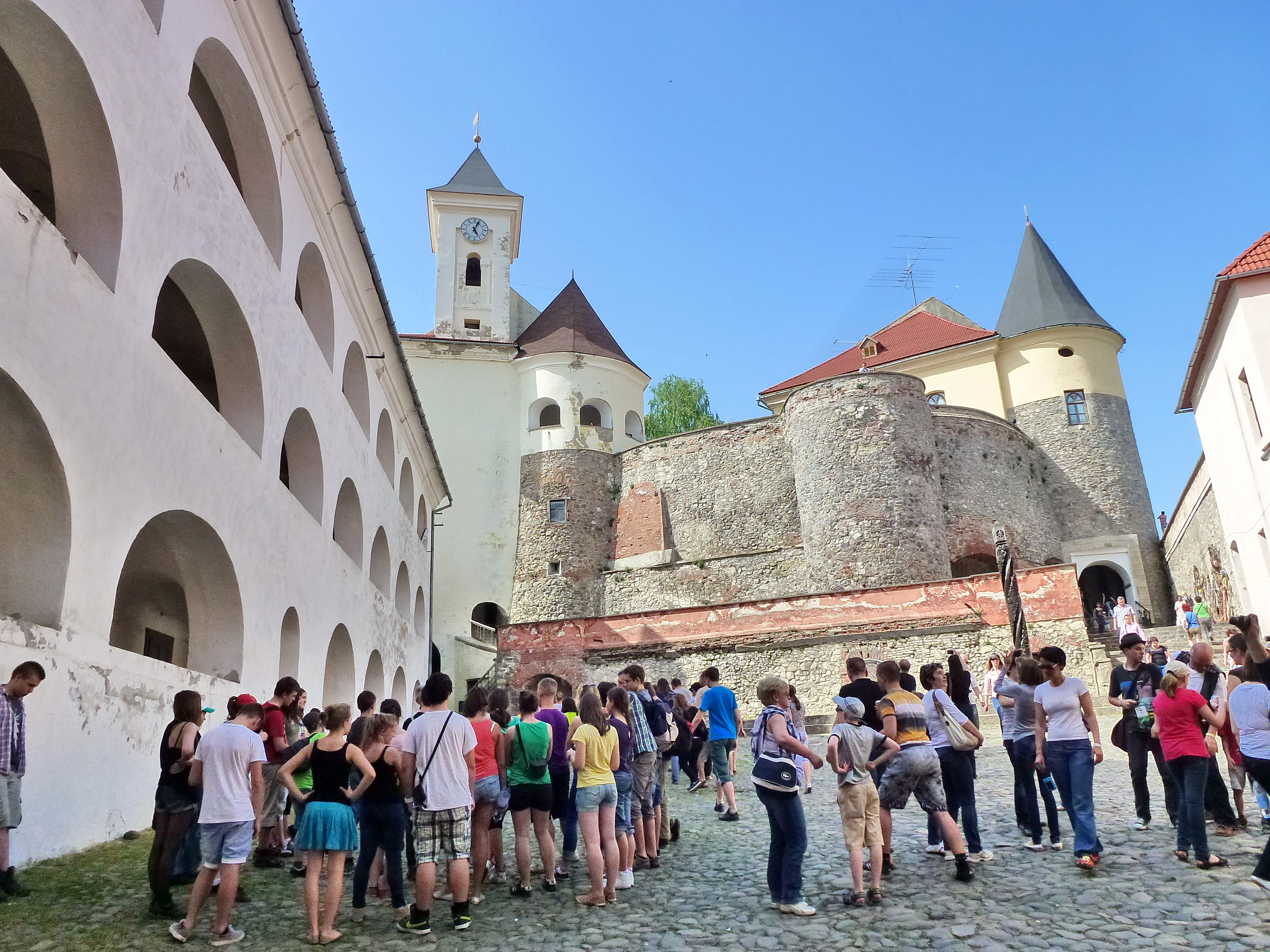
Palanok Castle, Mukachevo (14-17th centuries)

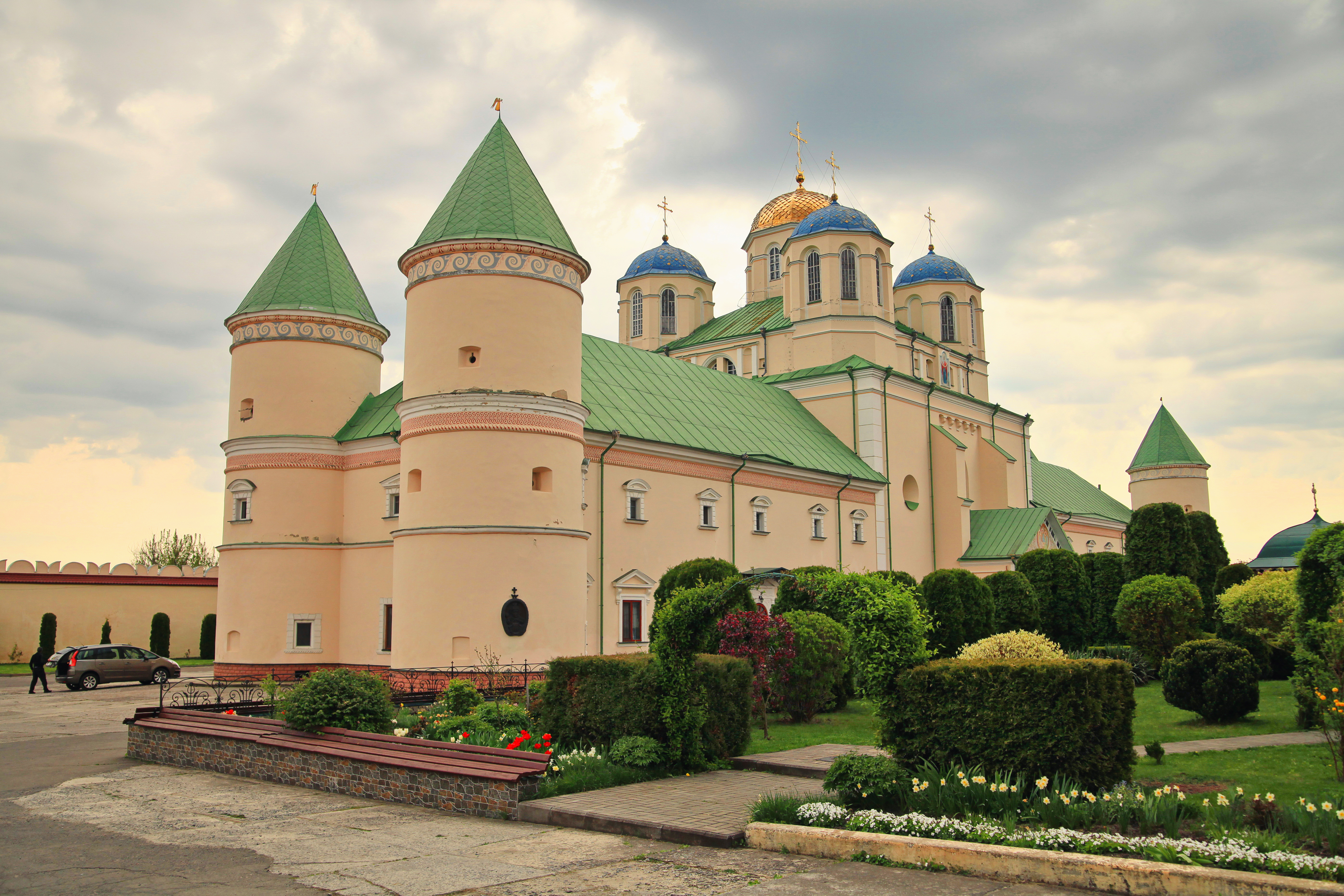
Mezhyrich Monastery (15th century)

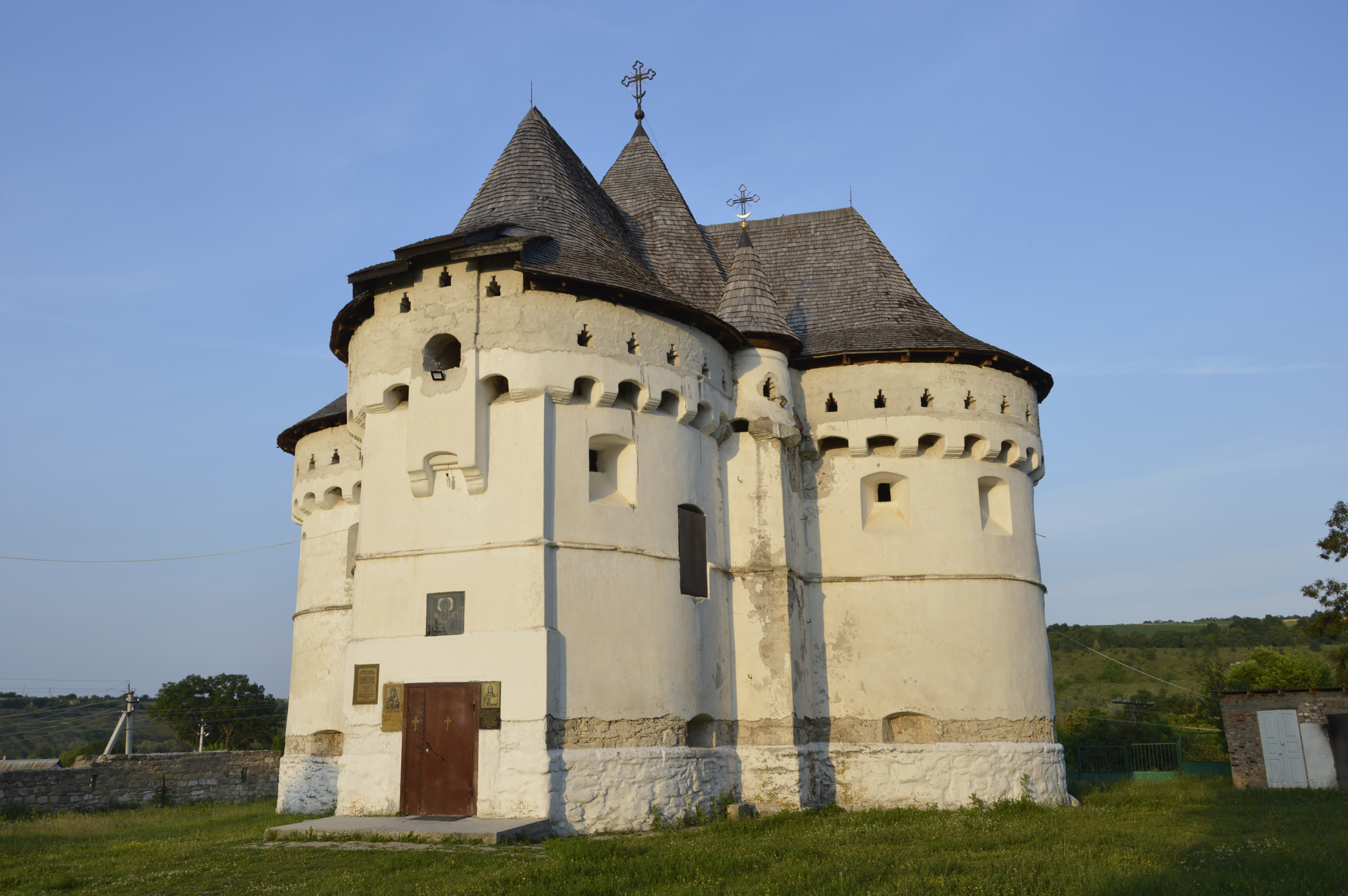
Intercession Church in Sutkivtsi (1476)

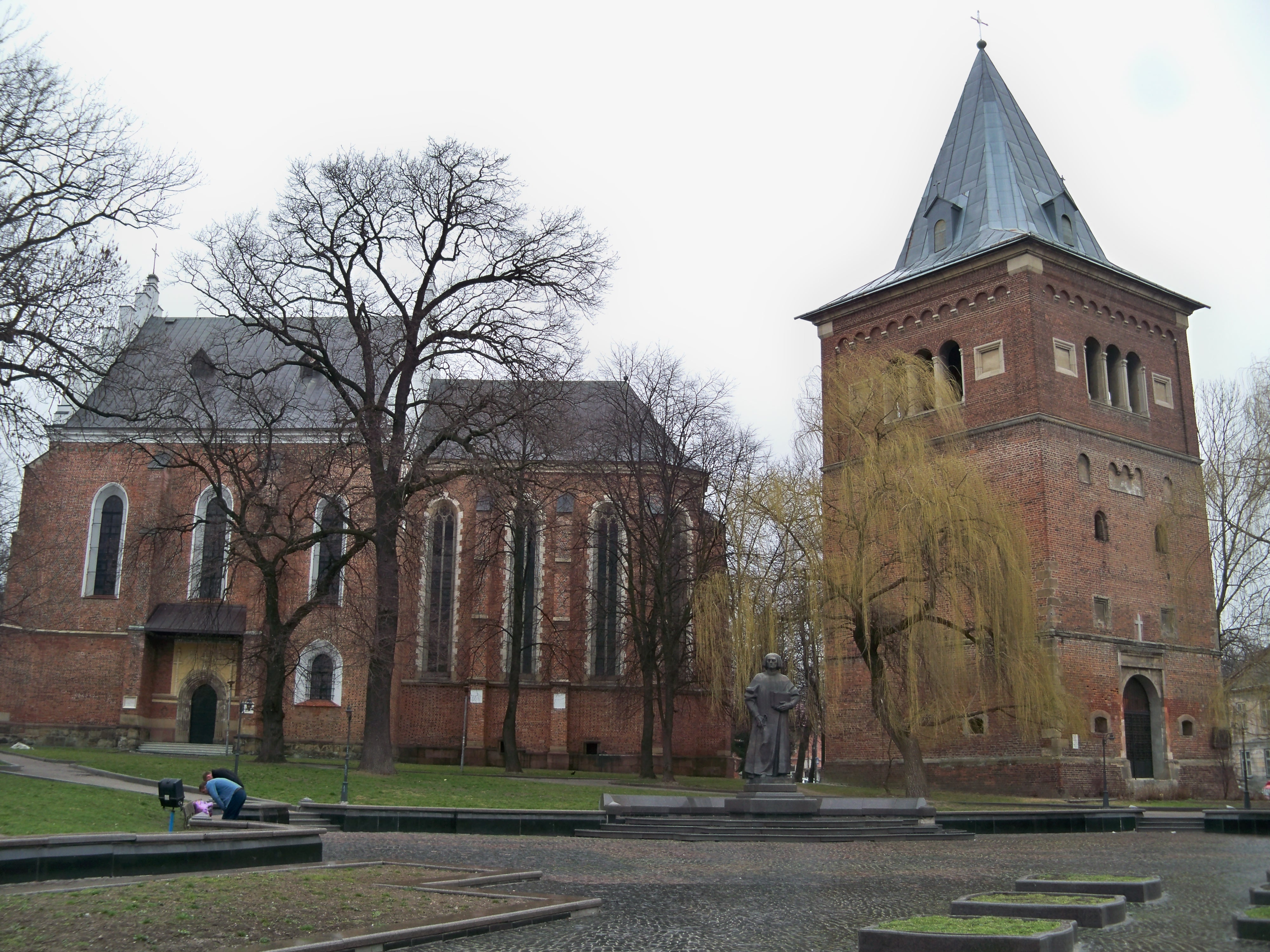
Church of Saint Bartholomew, Drohobych (15-16th centuries)

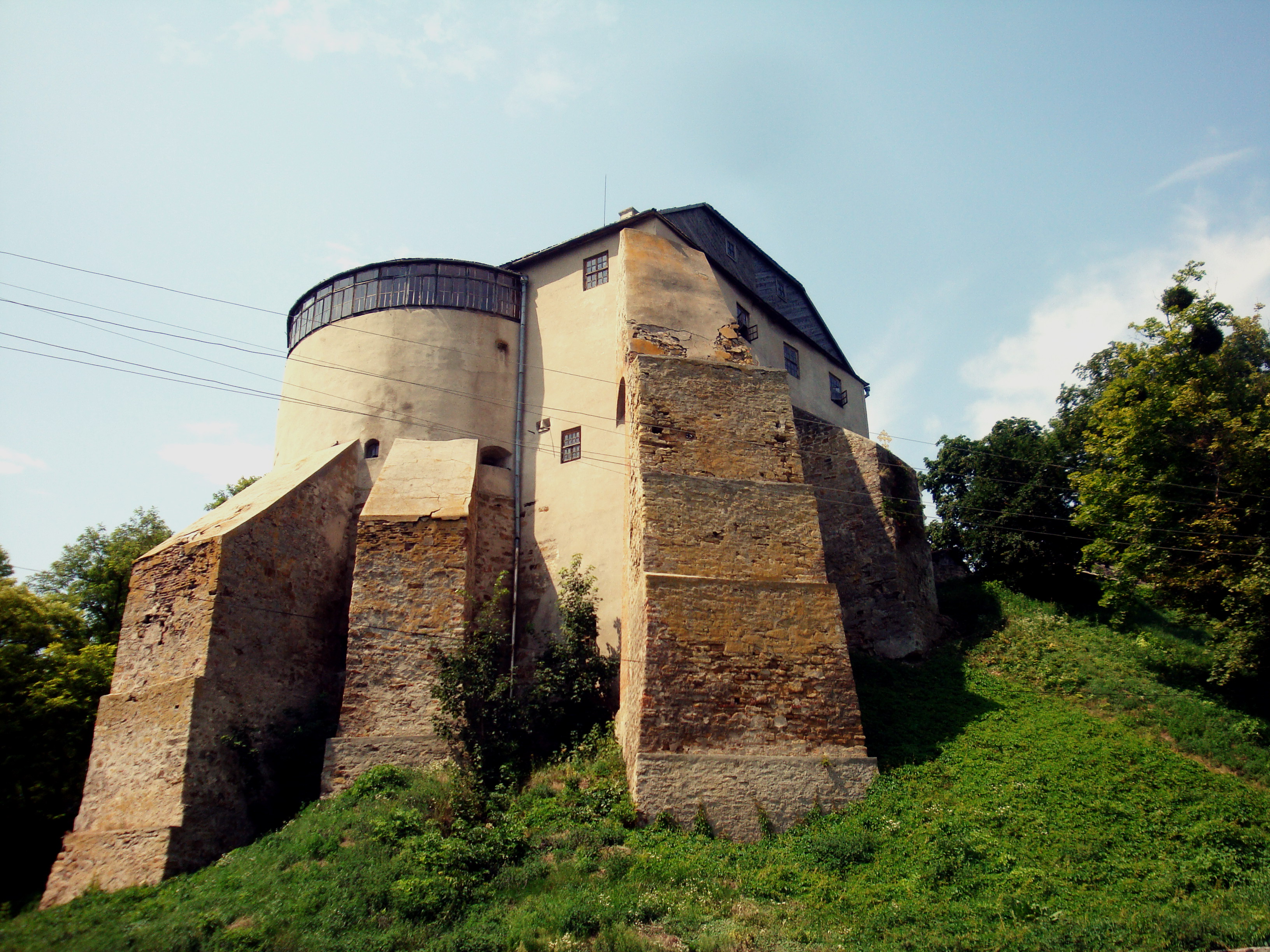
Tower of Ostroh Castle (15-17th centuries)

=== Early Modern Era ===
In the 16th century Ukrainian lands saw the spread of Renaissance architecture, which was actively adopted by self-governed cities of the time. Many prominent architects who worked in that style came from Italy, and the names of some of them have been preserved in historical documents: Peter the Italian, Peter Krasowski, Peter Barbona, Paul Dominici the Roman, Ambrosius Nutclauss etc. The most significant concentration of Renaissance buildings in Ukraine can be found in Lviv's Market Square and the surrounding areas, with prominent structures in that style including the Black House (1577), Korniakt Palace (1580), Boim (1617) and Campian Chapels (c. 1619), Bandinelli Palace, as well as the complex of the Dormition Church: Korniakt's Tower (1572–1578), Chapel of Three Hierarchs (1578) and the church itself (1591–1629). The latter two structures are built under the influence of native Ukrainian church architecture.

In the late 16th and early 17th centuries churches combining the Renaissance style and local traditions were also constructed in Sokal, Novoselytsia, Lutsk, Horodok, Shchyrets. Reconstructions of older churches, which were performed during that time in Kyiv, Chernihiv, Oster, Pereiaslav, Kaniv and Novhorod-Siverskyi also bore some elements of Renaissance architecture. Late Renaissance elements are also present in the architecture of Roman Catholic cathedrals in Lviv, Lutsk and Kamianets. The style of St. Elijah's Church in Subotiv (1656) and St. Paraskeva Church in Lviv can be seen as transitional between Renaissance and Baroque.

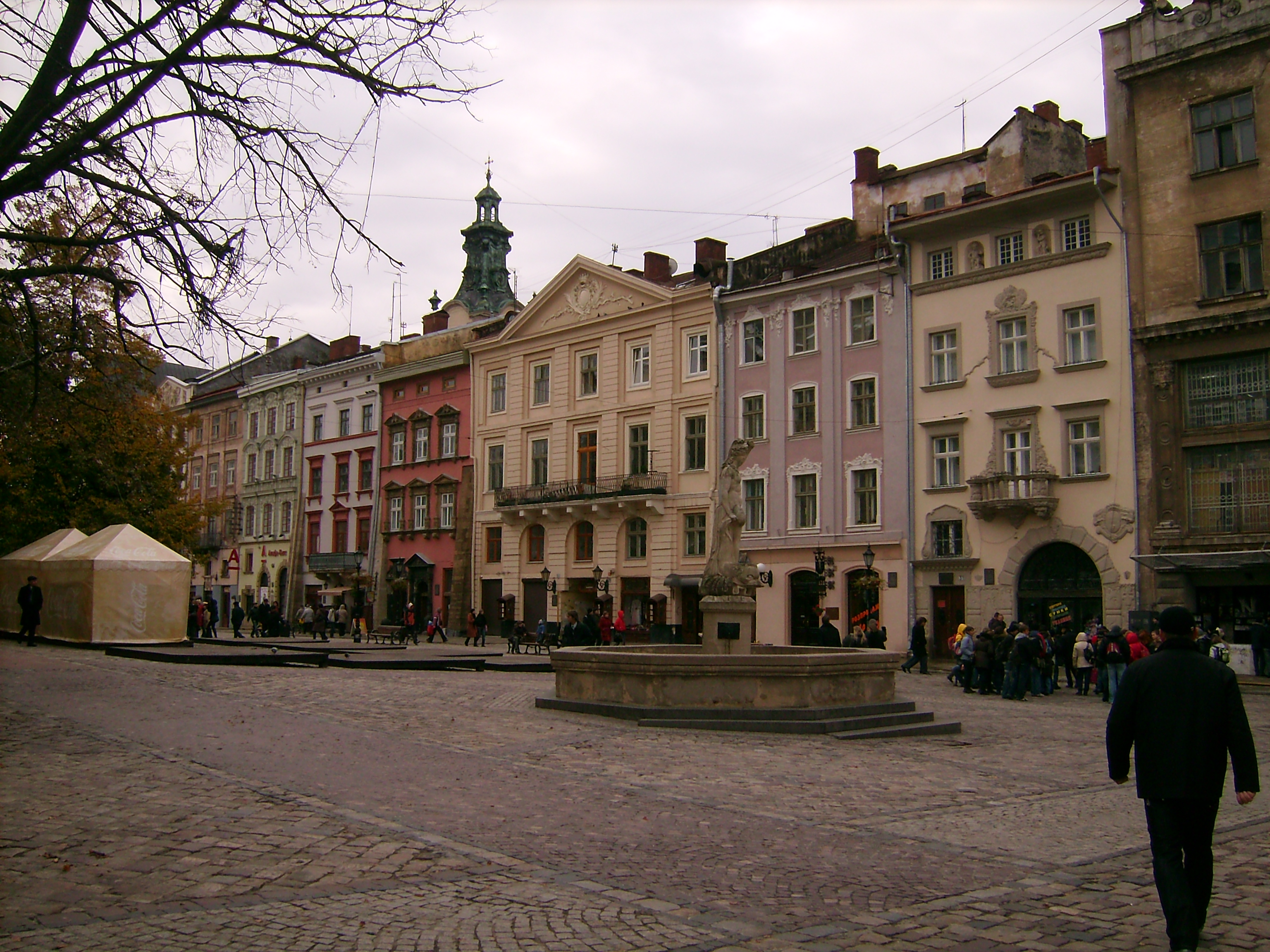
Market Square in Lviv (16-17th centuries)

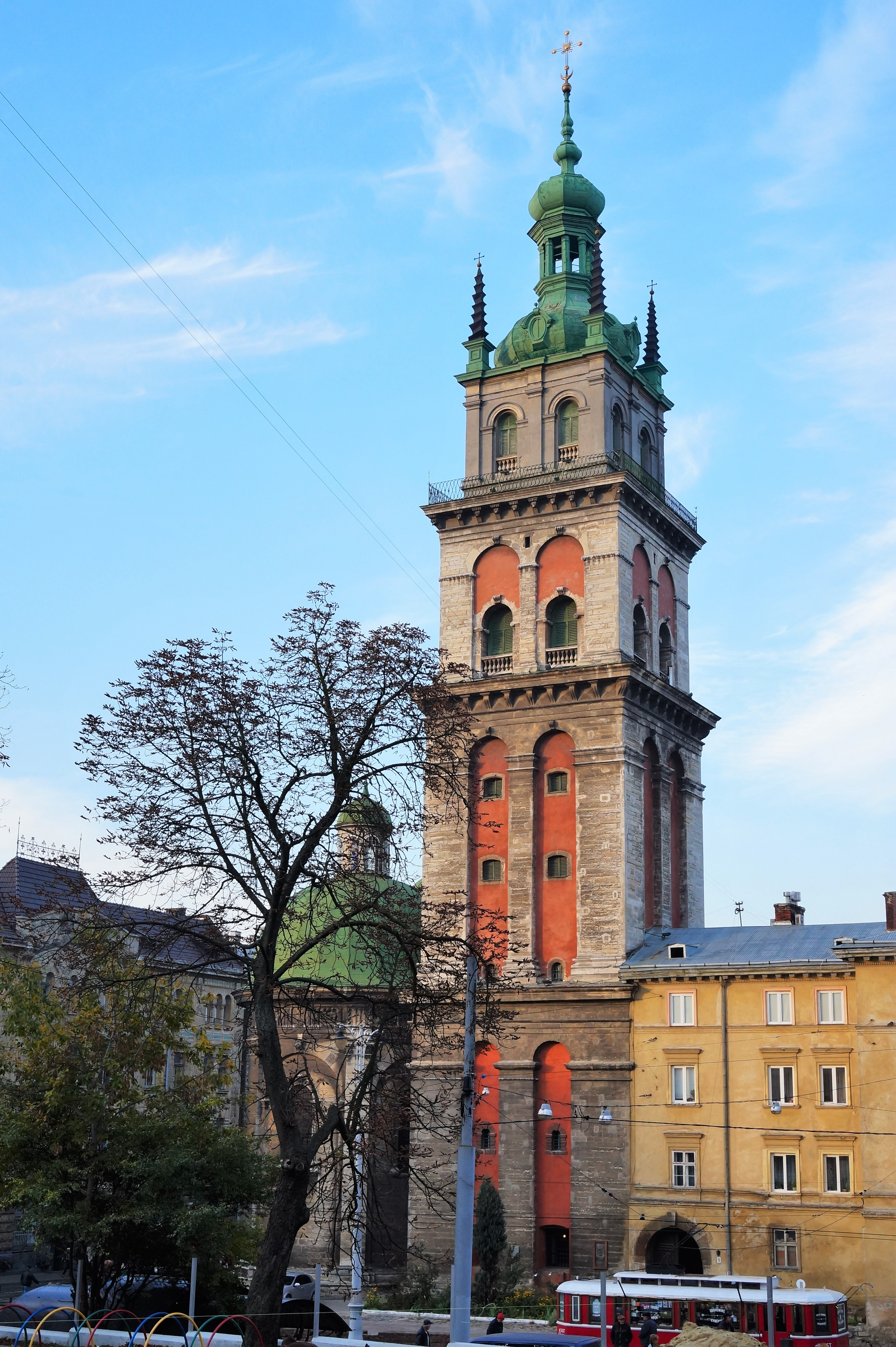
Korniakt's Tower, Lviv (1572-1578)

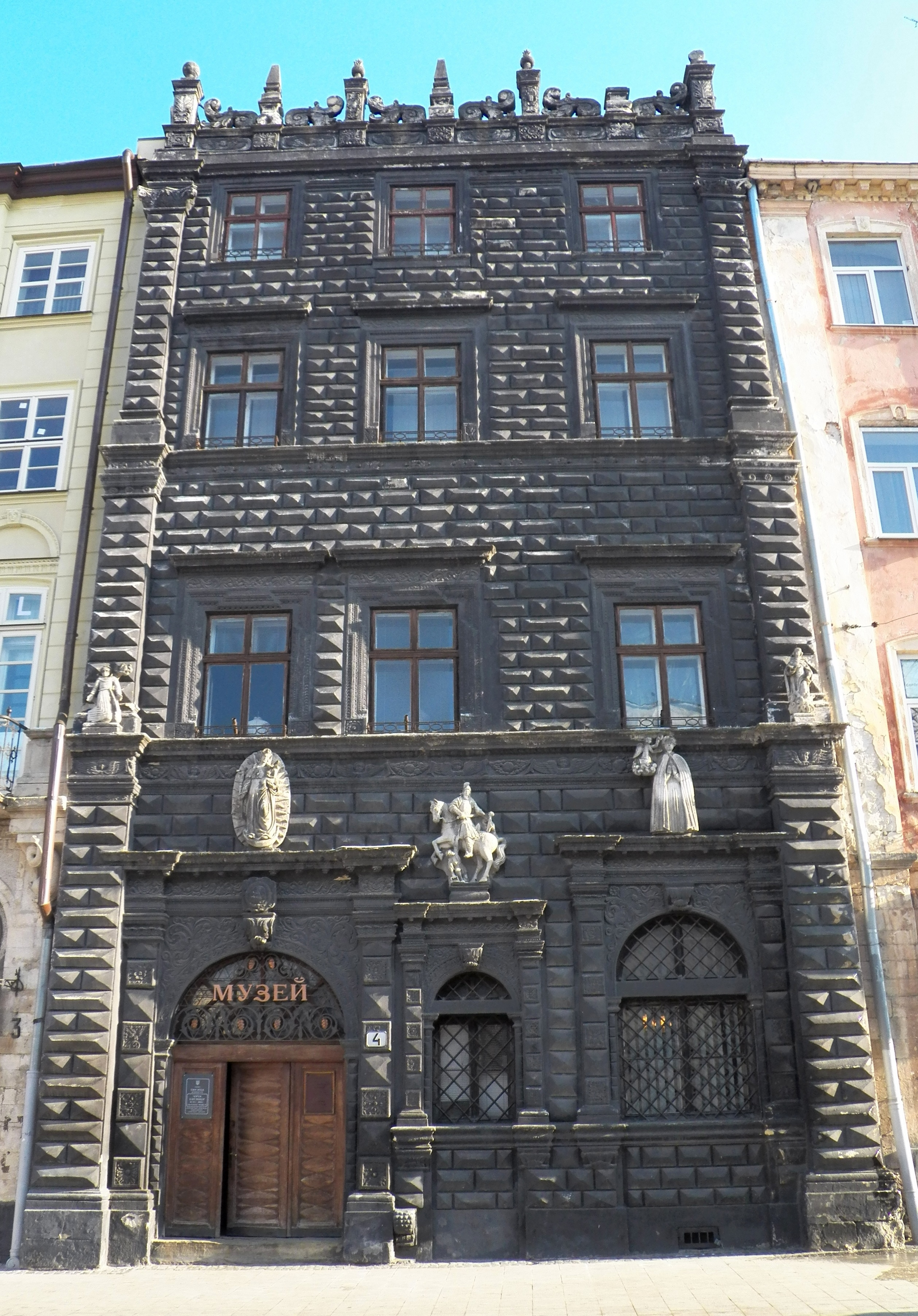
Black House, Lviv (1577)

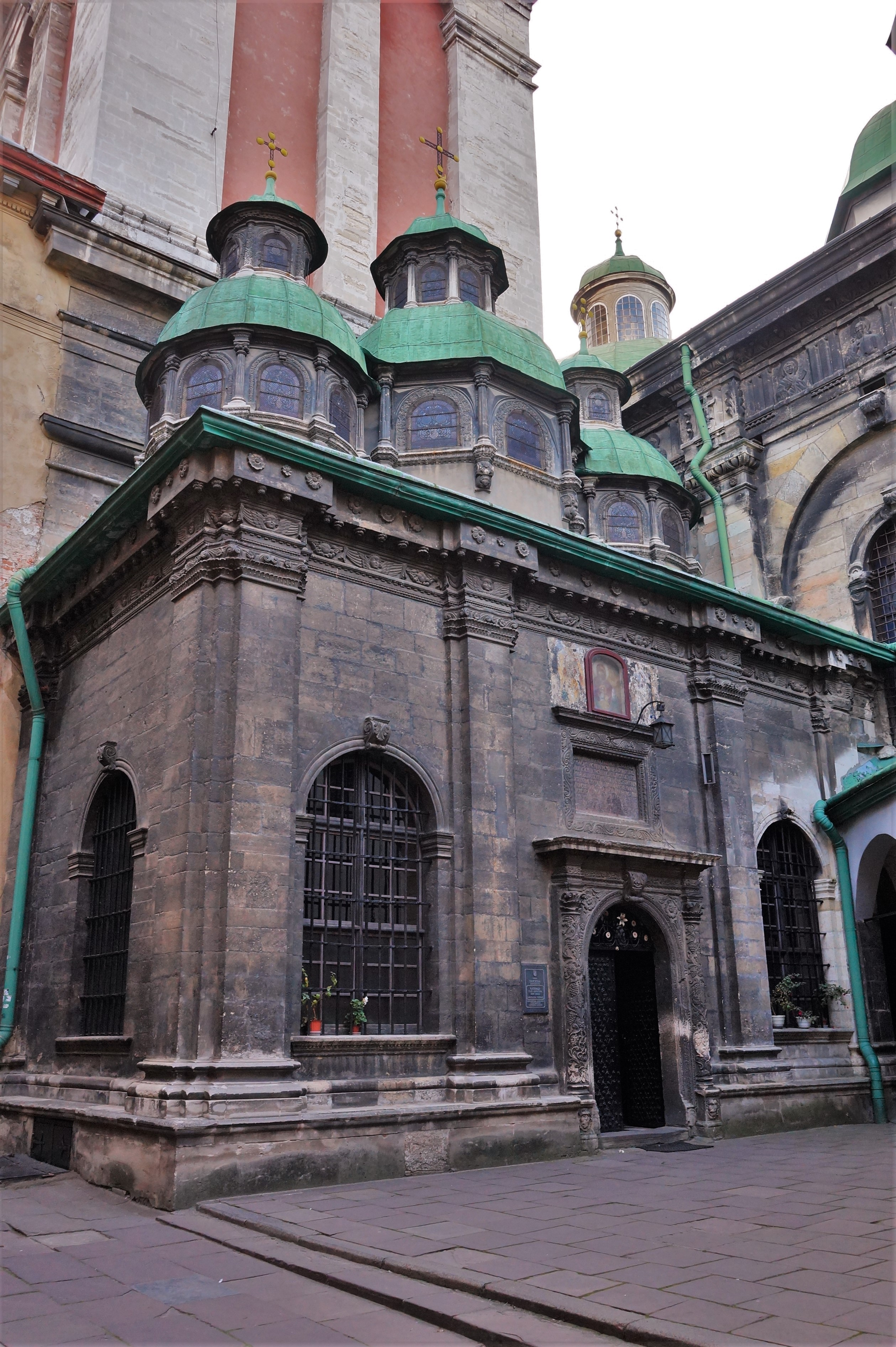
Three Hierarchs Chapel, Lviv (1578)

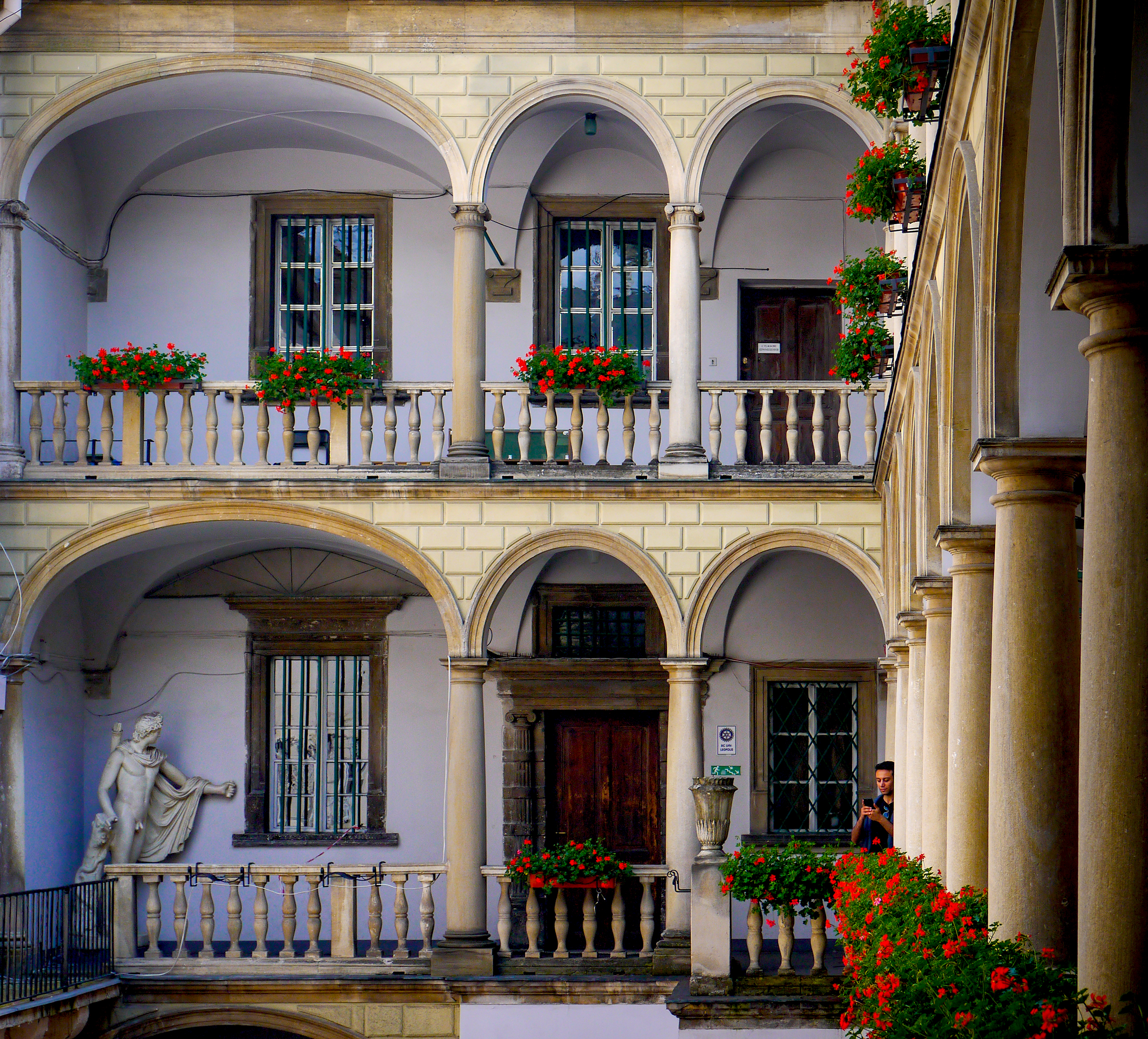
Court of Korniakt Palace, Lviv (1580)

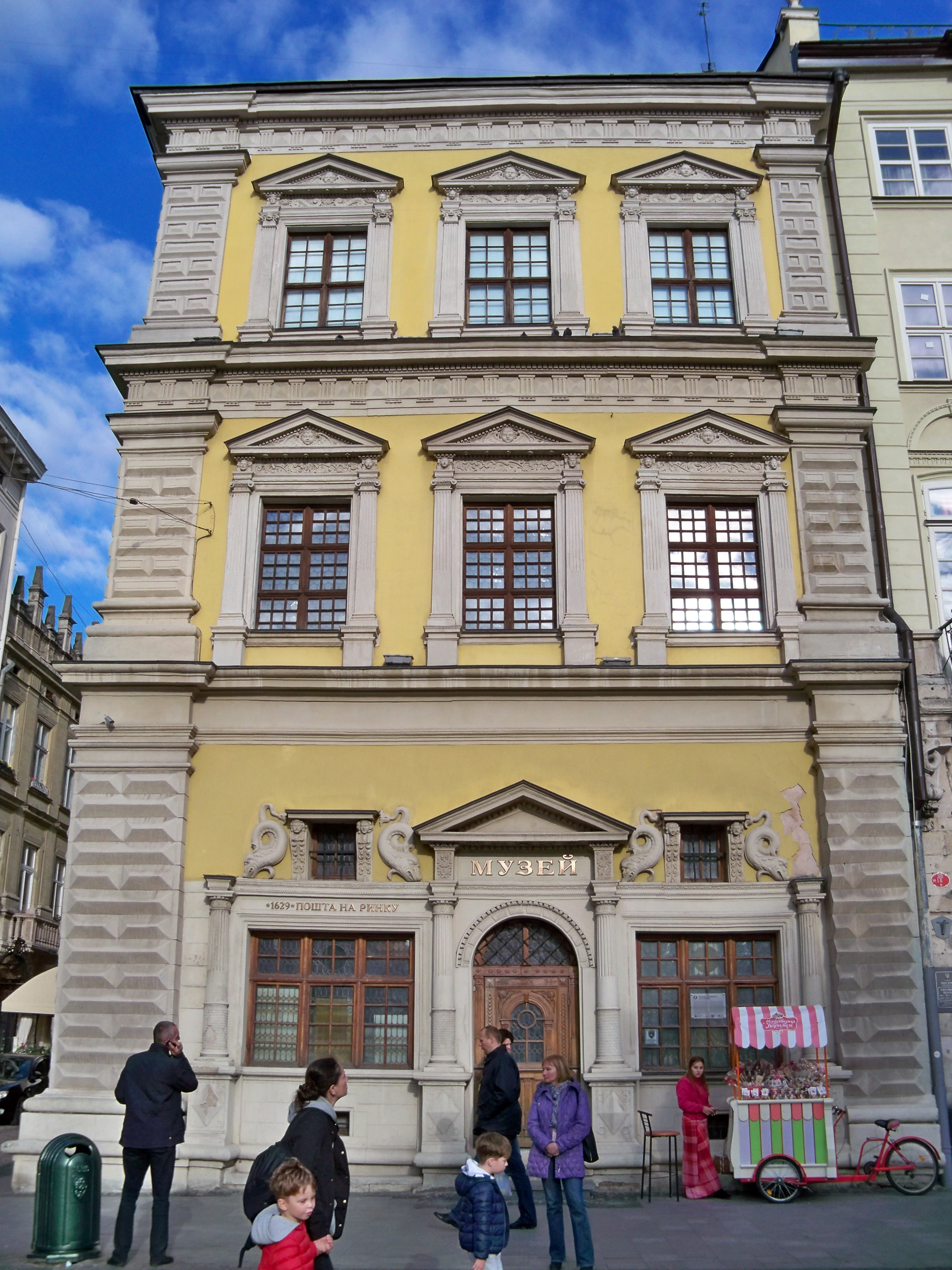
Bandinelli Palace, Lviv (1593)

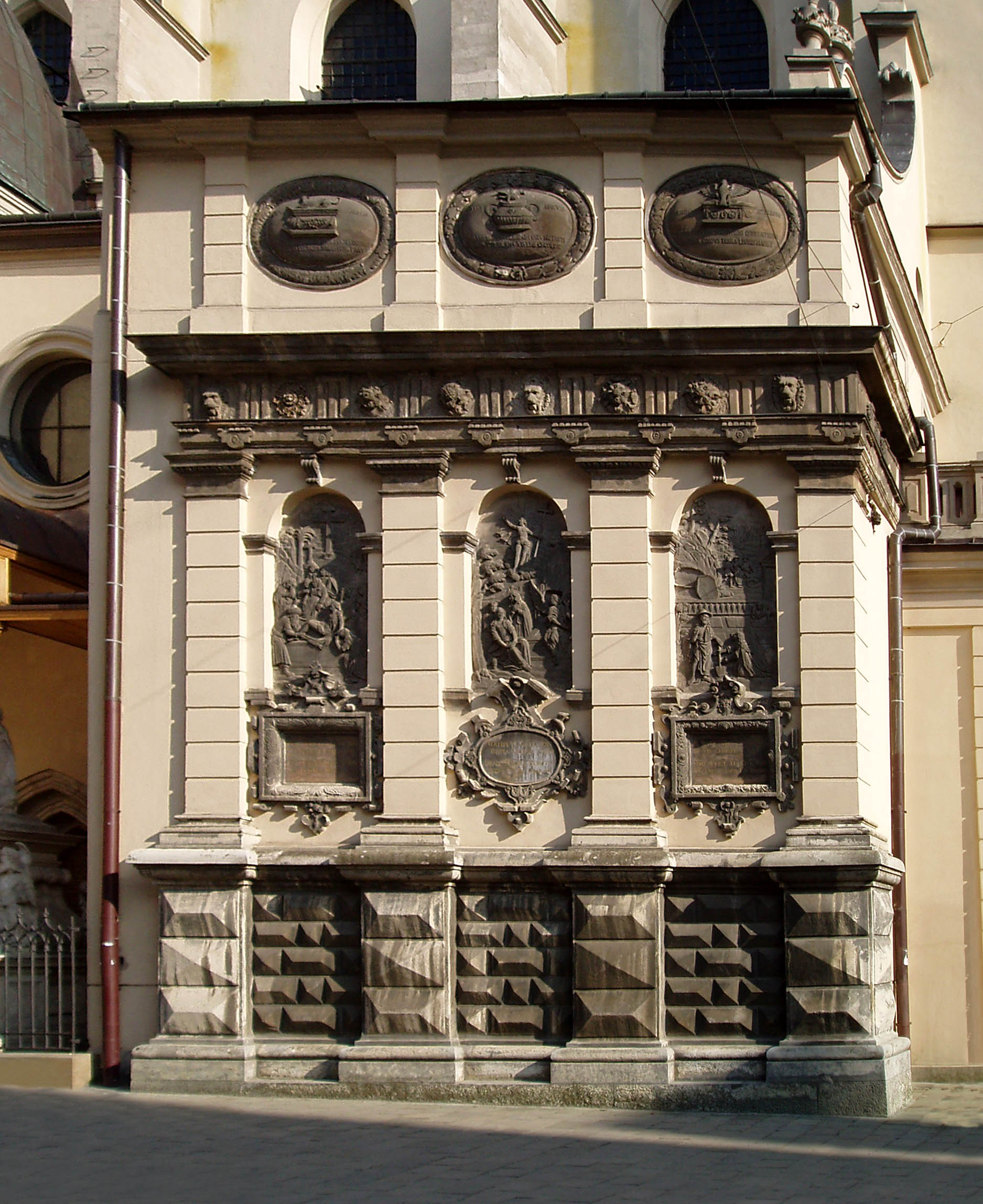
Campian Chapel, Lviv (c.1619)

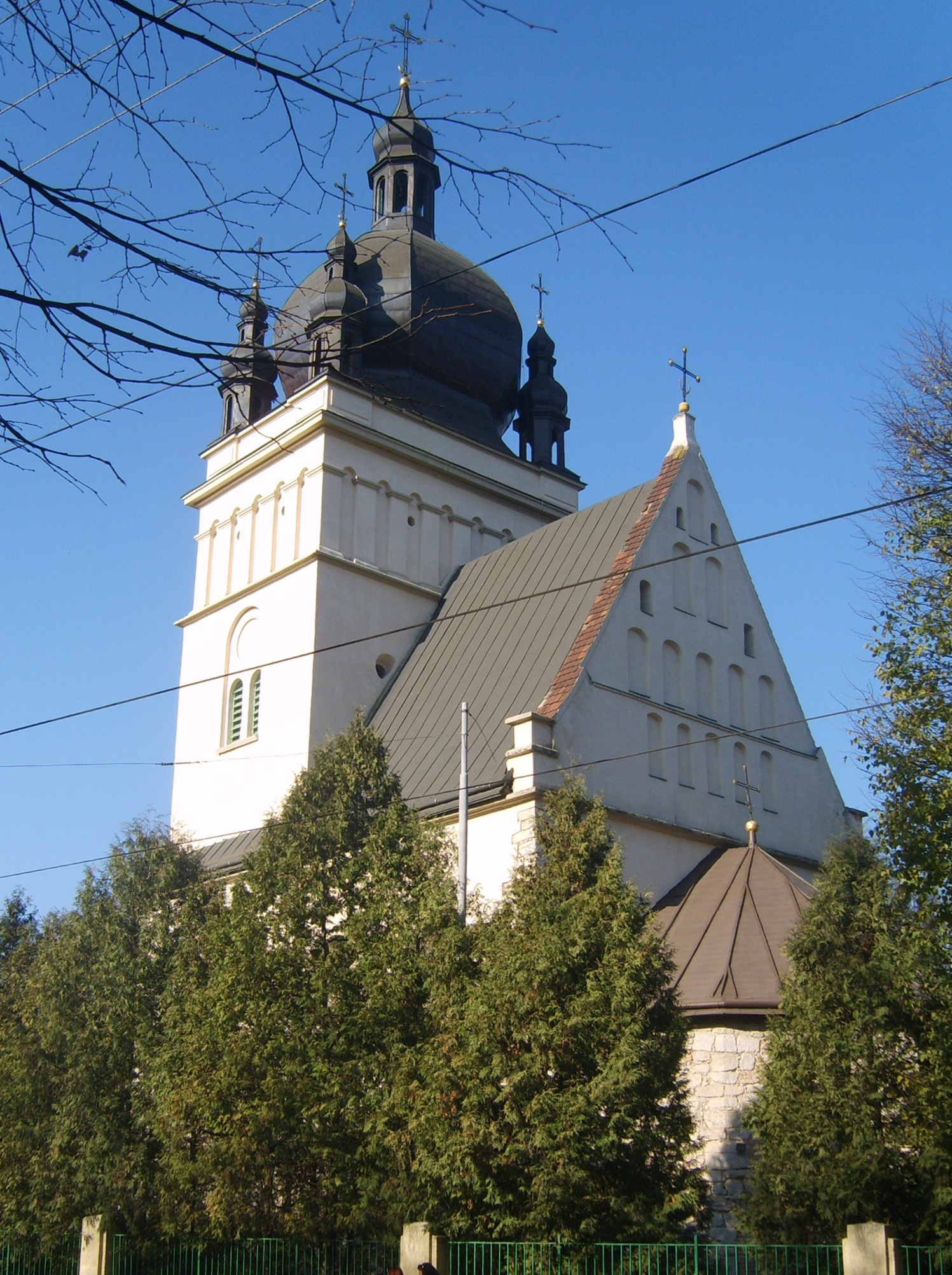
Saint Paraskeva Church, Lviv (13-14th centuries, rebuilt 1644)

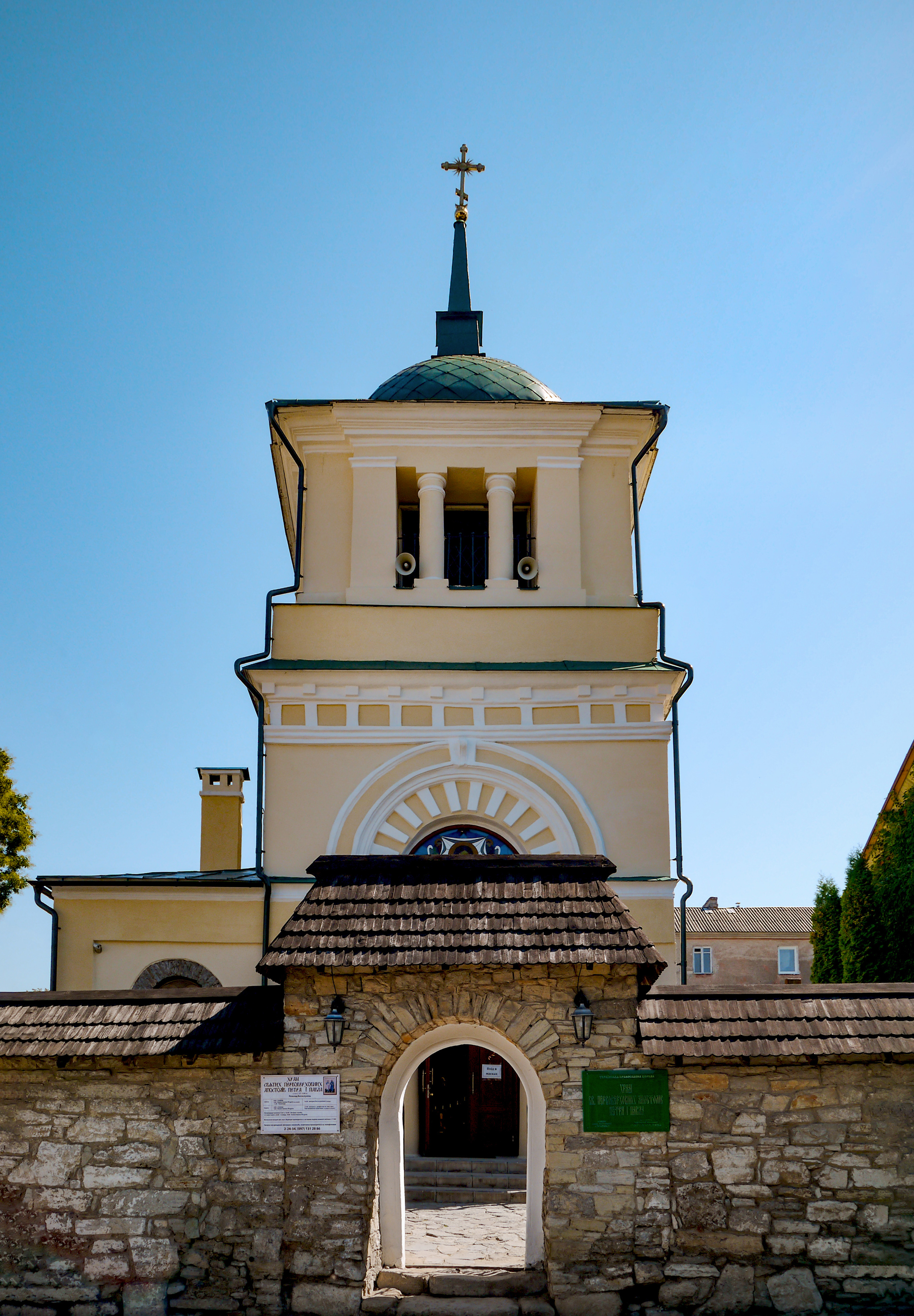
Sts. Peter and Paul Church, Kamianets-Podilskyi (16th century)

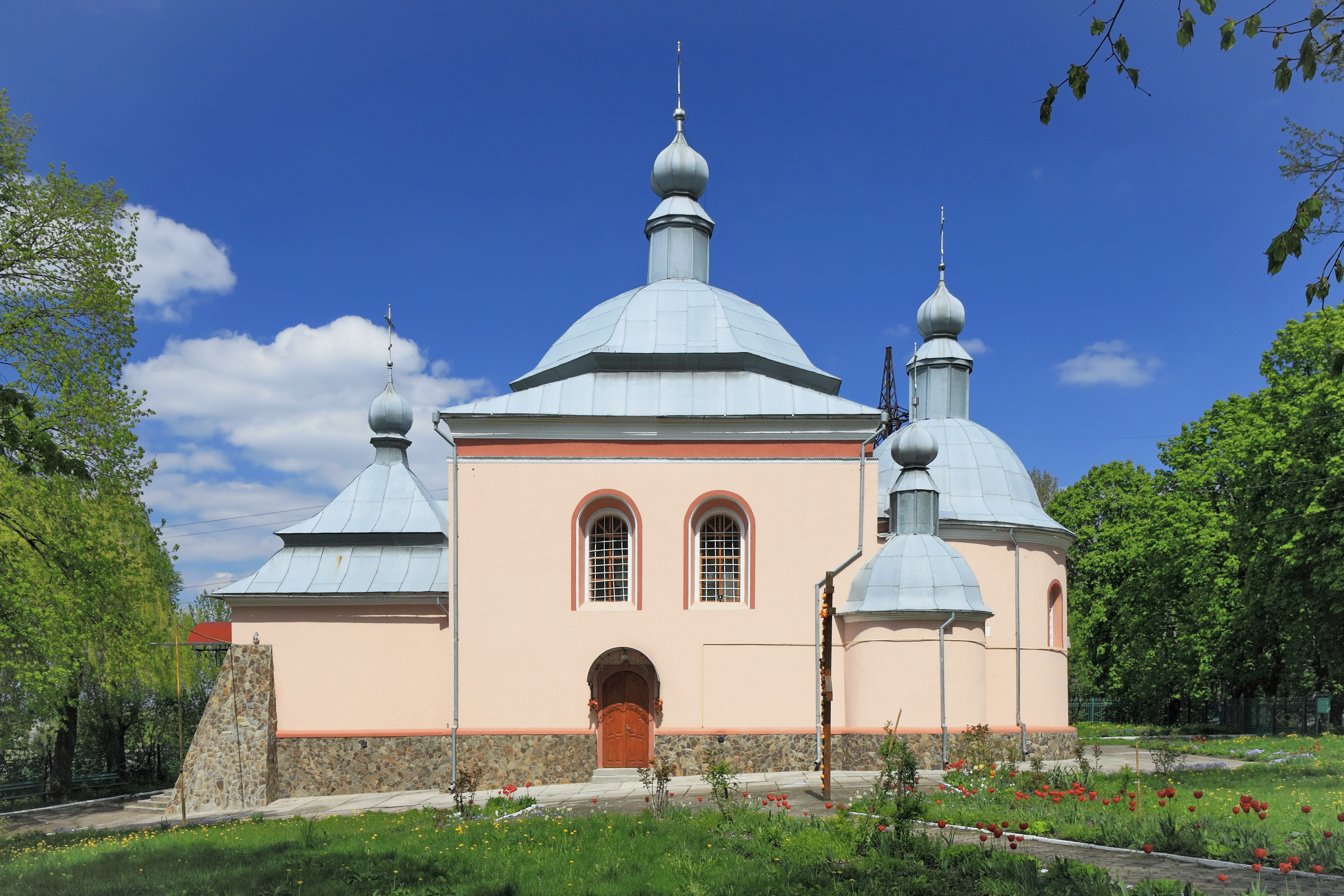
St. Nicholas Church, Sokal (16th century)

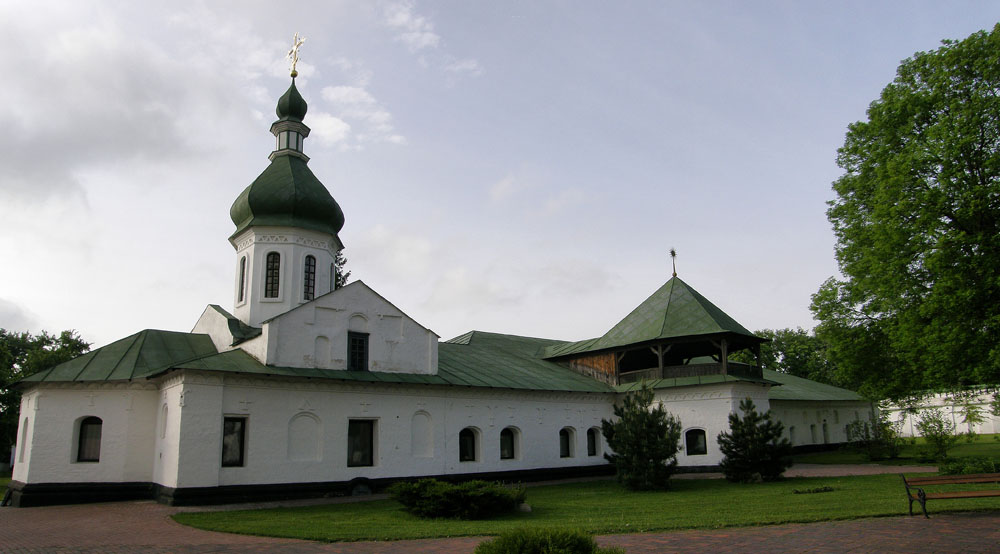
Residential pavilion of the Novhorod-Siverskyi Transfiguration Monastery (17th century)

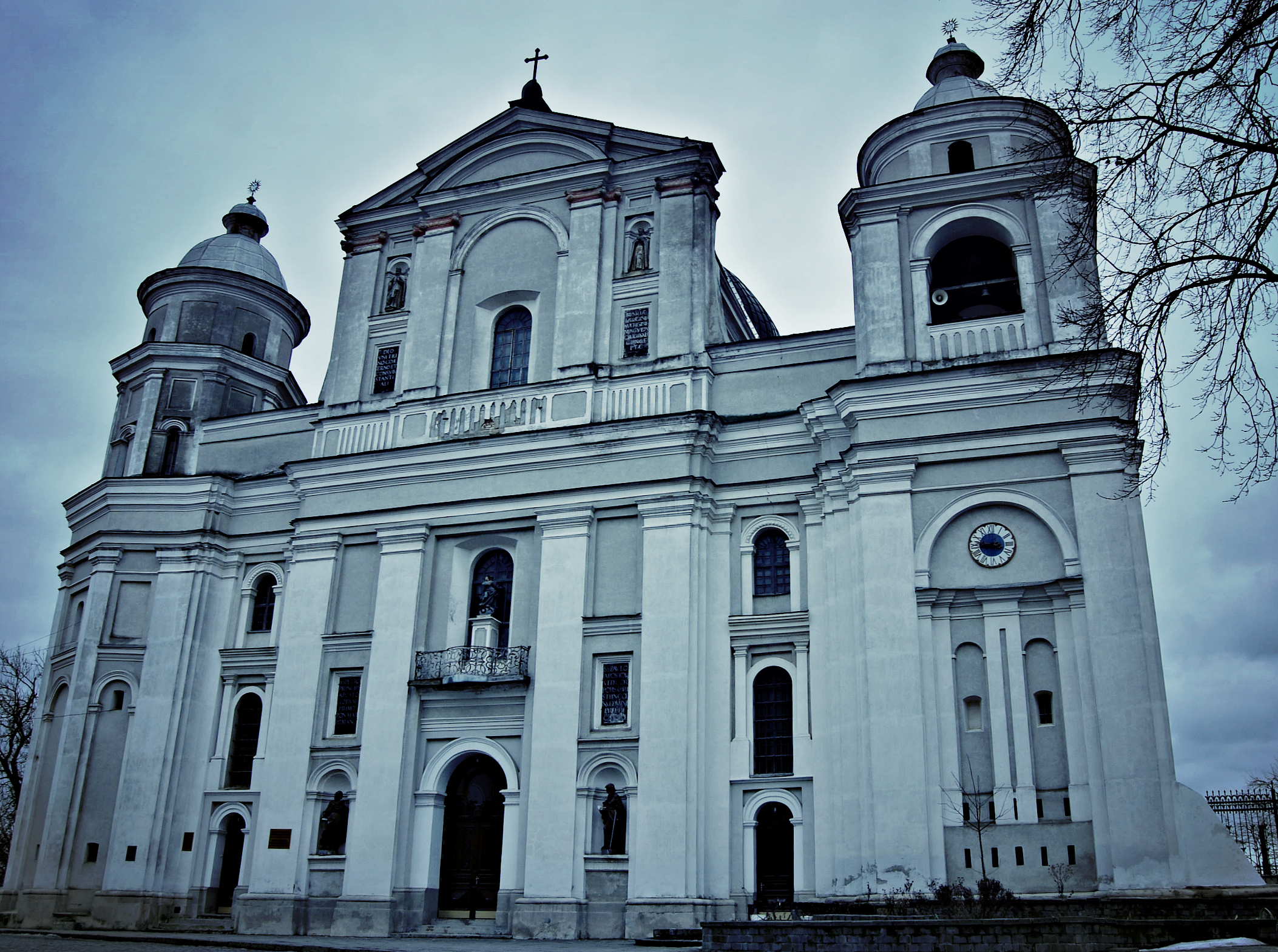
Sts. Peter and Paul Cathedral, Lutsk (1616-1646)

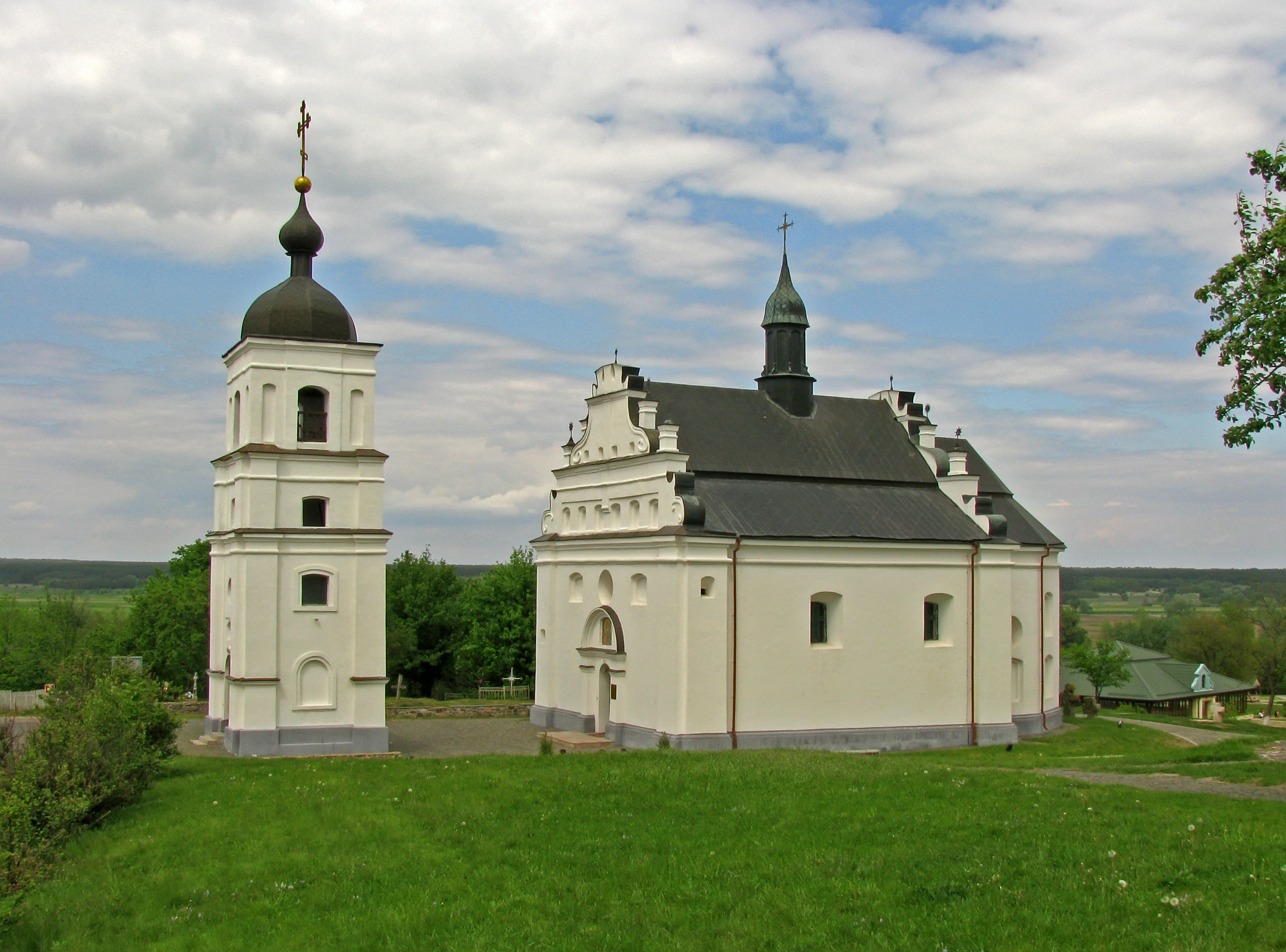
Saint Elijah's Church, Subotiv (1656)

=== Cossack era ===
==== Central and Eastern Ukraine ====
Ukrainian Baroque emerged during the Hetmanate era of the 17th–18th centuries. Representative of the Сossack aristocracy, this style is distinct from Western European Baroque in that its designs were more constructivist, had more moderate ornamentation, and were simpler in form.

Among the earliest examples of Ukrainian Baroque is the St. Nicholas Cathedral in Nizhyn. Famous examples of Ukrainian Baroque stone churches include the Kyiv Pechersk Lavra, St. George's Cathedral of Vydubychi Monastery (1696), Trinity Monastery in Chernihiv (1679), cathedral of the Mhar Monastery near Lubny (1684), St. Nicholas Military Cathedral (1690) and Brotherhood Monastery (1695) in Kyiv (both destroyed by the Soviets), Intercession Cathedral in Kharkiv (1689), Holy Spirit Cathedral in Romny, Resurrection Cathedral in Sumy, Dormition Church in Liutenka, Poltava Oblast (destroyed), Trinity Church of Hustynia Monastery, Chernihiv Oblast (1672–1674), Transfiguration Church in Pryluky (1716). A major wooden church built in this style is the Trinity Cathedral in Samar (1772–1781).

During the 17th–18th centuries, most medieval Rus' churches were significantly redesigned and expanded. Additional church domes and elaborate exterior and interior ornamentation were added. Among the most prominent examples of reconstruction are the exteriors of St. Sophia Cathedral in Kyiv (rebuilt in 1691–1705), Dormition Cathedral of Kyiv Pechersk Lavra (rebuilt 1695–1722), St. Michael's Golden-Domed Monastery, St. Michael's Church of Vydubychi Monastery and Church of the Saviour at Berestove (rebuilt by Petro Mohyla in 1638–1643).

Civilian buildings constructed in Ukrainian Baroque style include the Samson Fountain in Kyiv, Regimental Chancellery building in Chernihiv, Lyzohub residence in Sedniv, Polubotok's house in Liubech, administrative and residential buildings in Kozelets, Nizhyn, and Pryluky.

Among the most prominent Ukrainian Baroque architects were Ivan Hryhorovych-Barskyi, Stepan Kovnir, Osip Startsev, Adam Zernikaw, Ivan Zarudny.

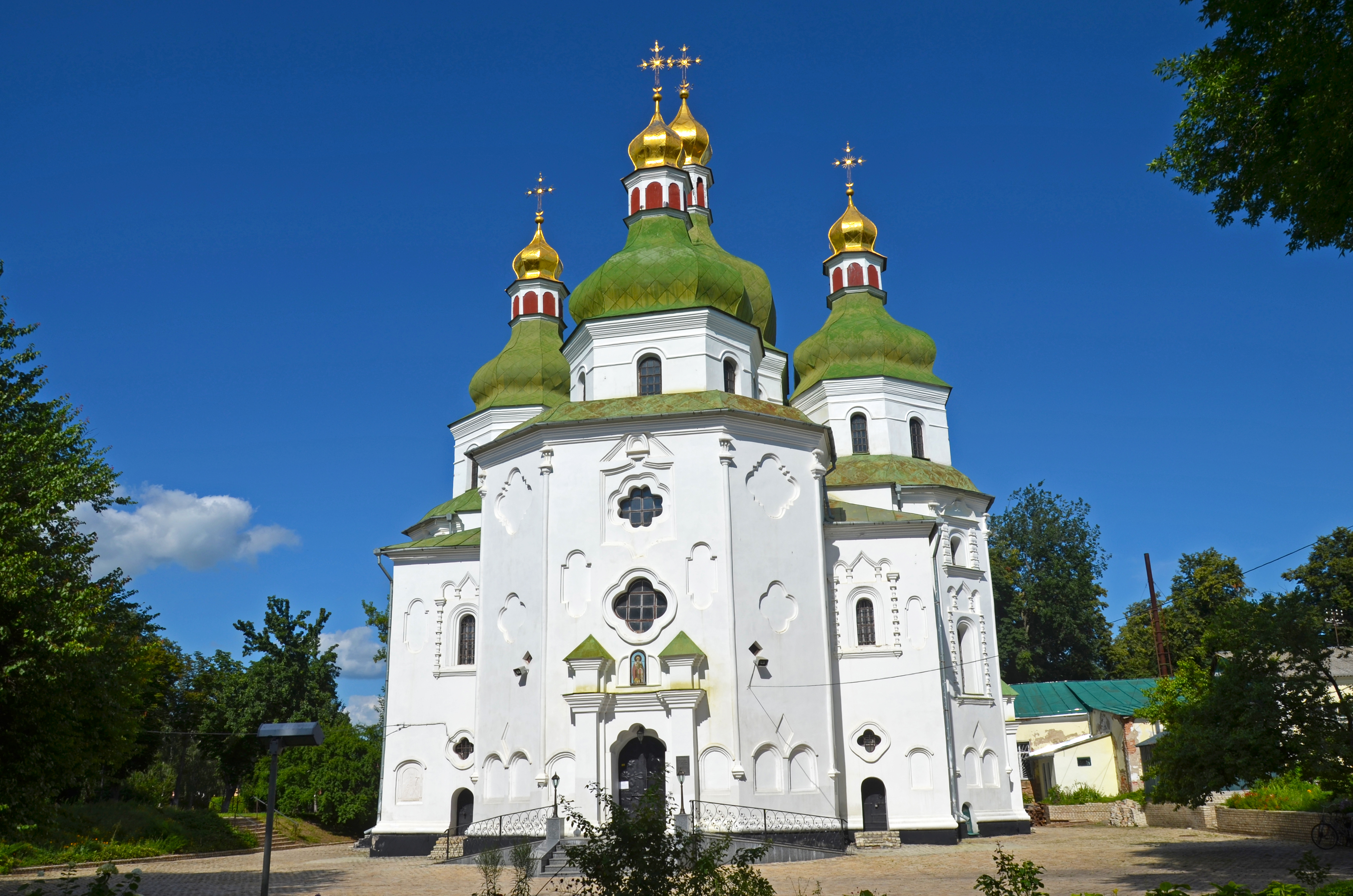
Saint Nicholas Cathedral, Nizhyn (1650s)

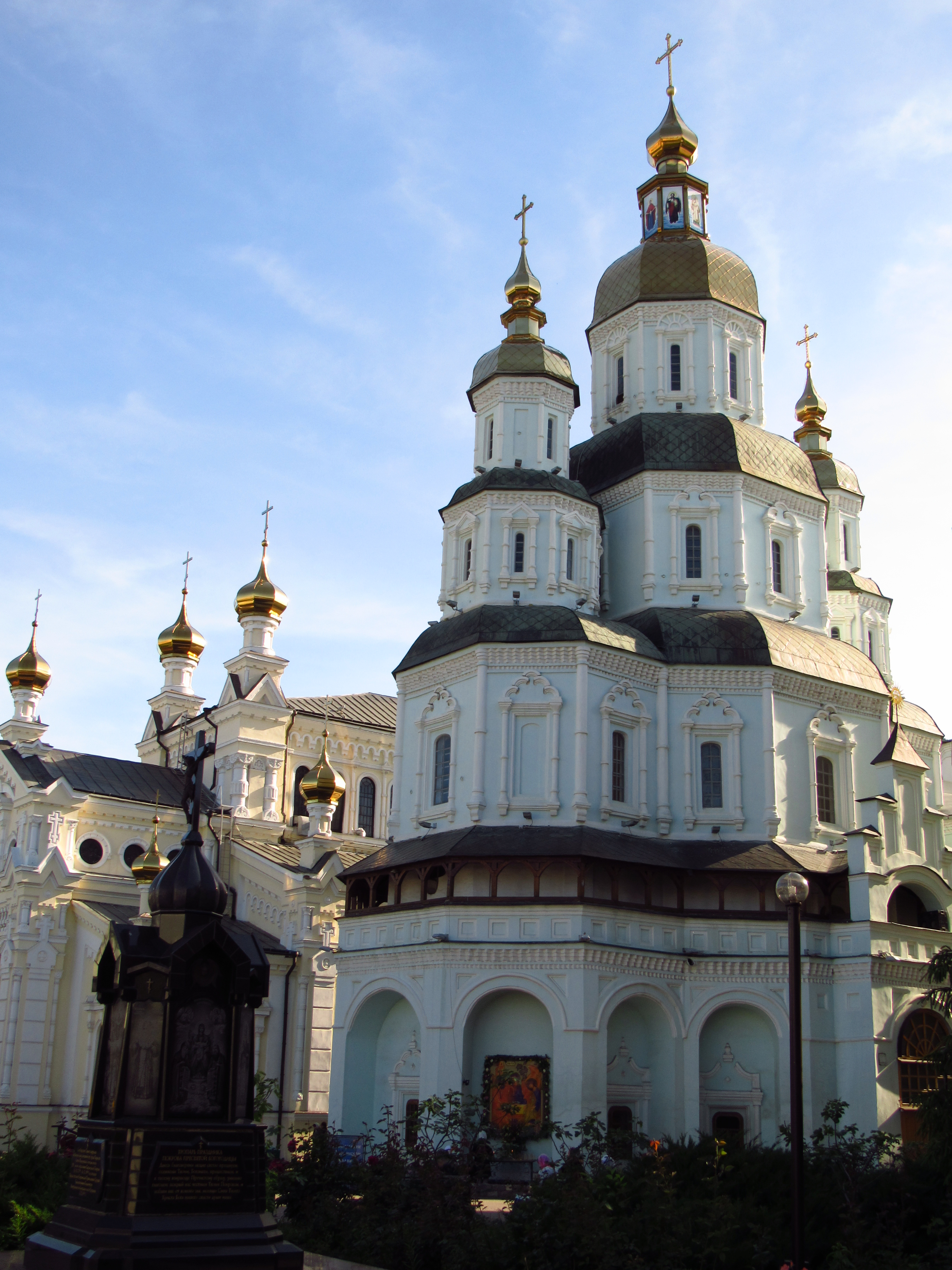
Intercession Cathedral, Kharkiv (1689)

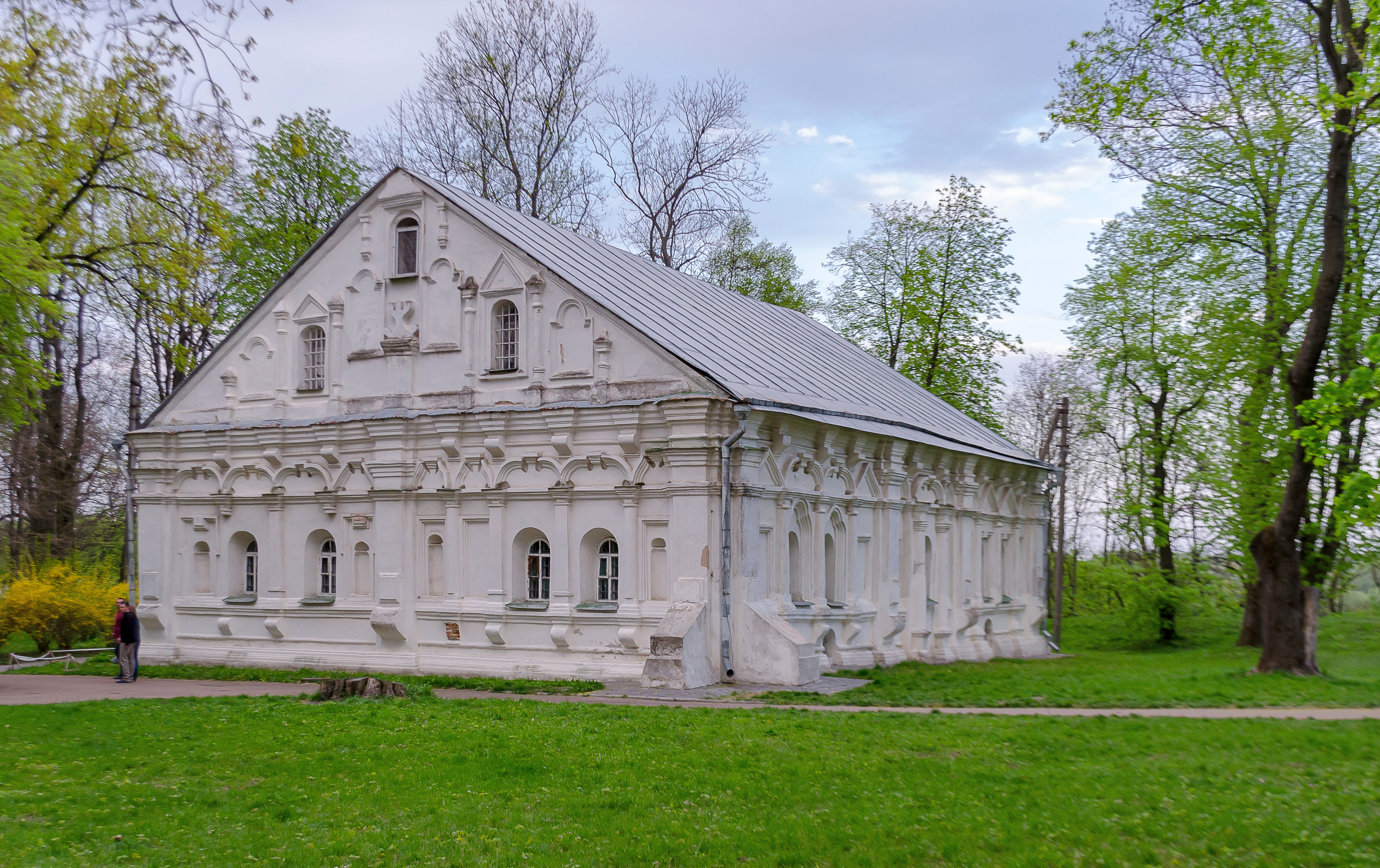
Chernihiv Regimental Chancellery building (1690s)

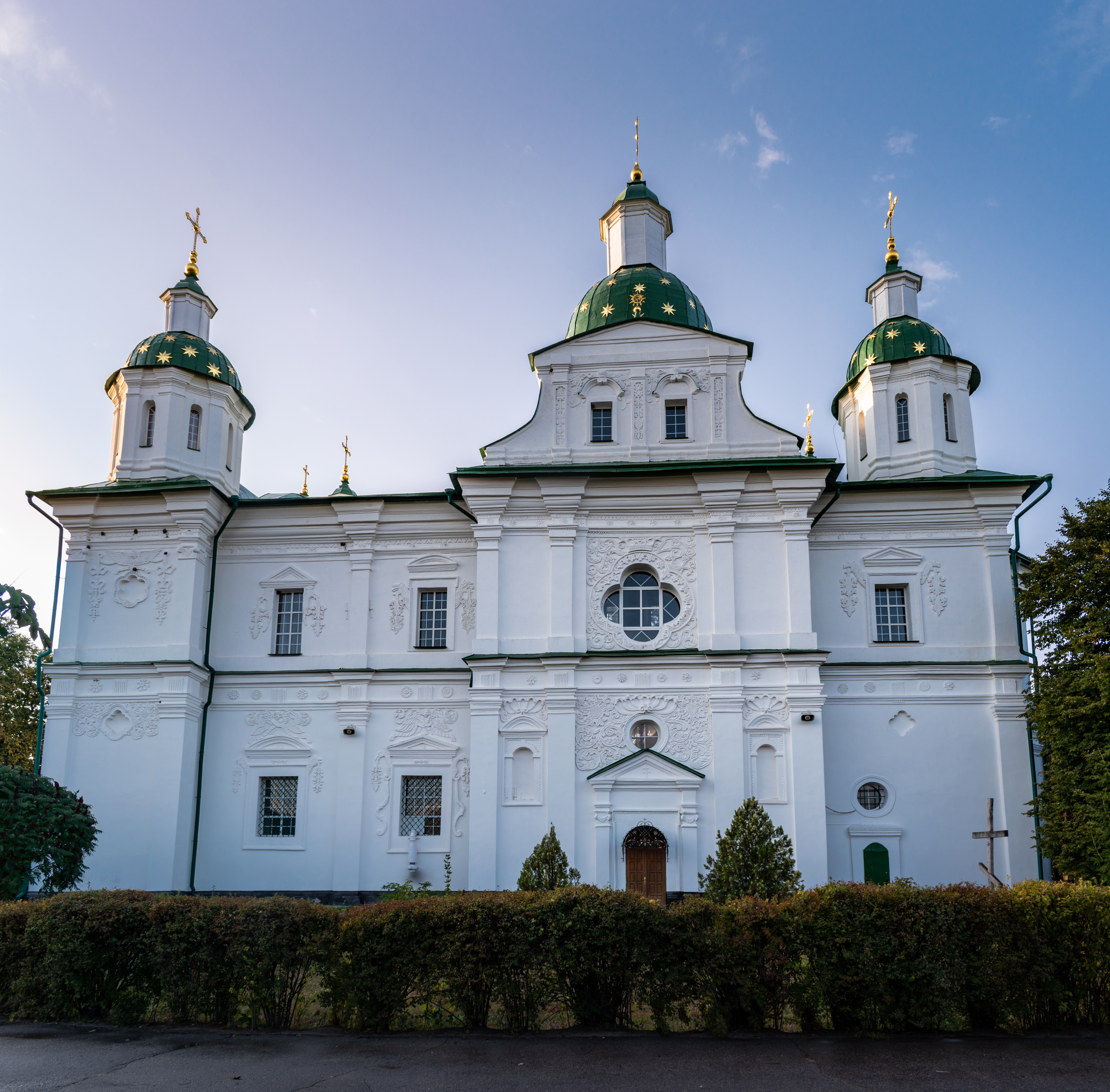
Transfiguration Cathedral in Mhar (1684-1692)

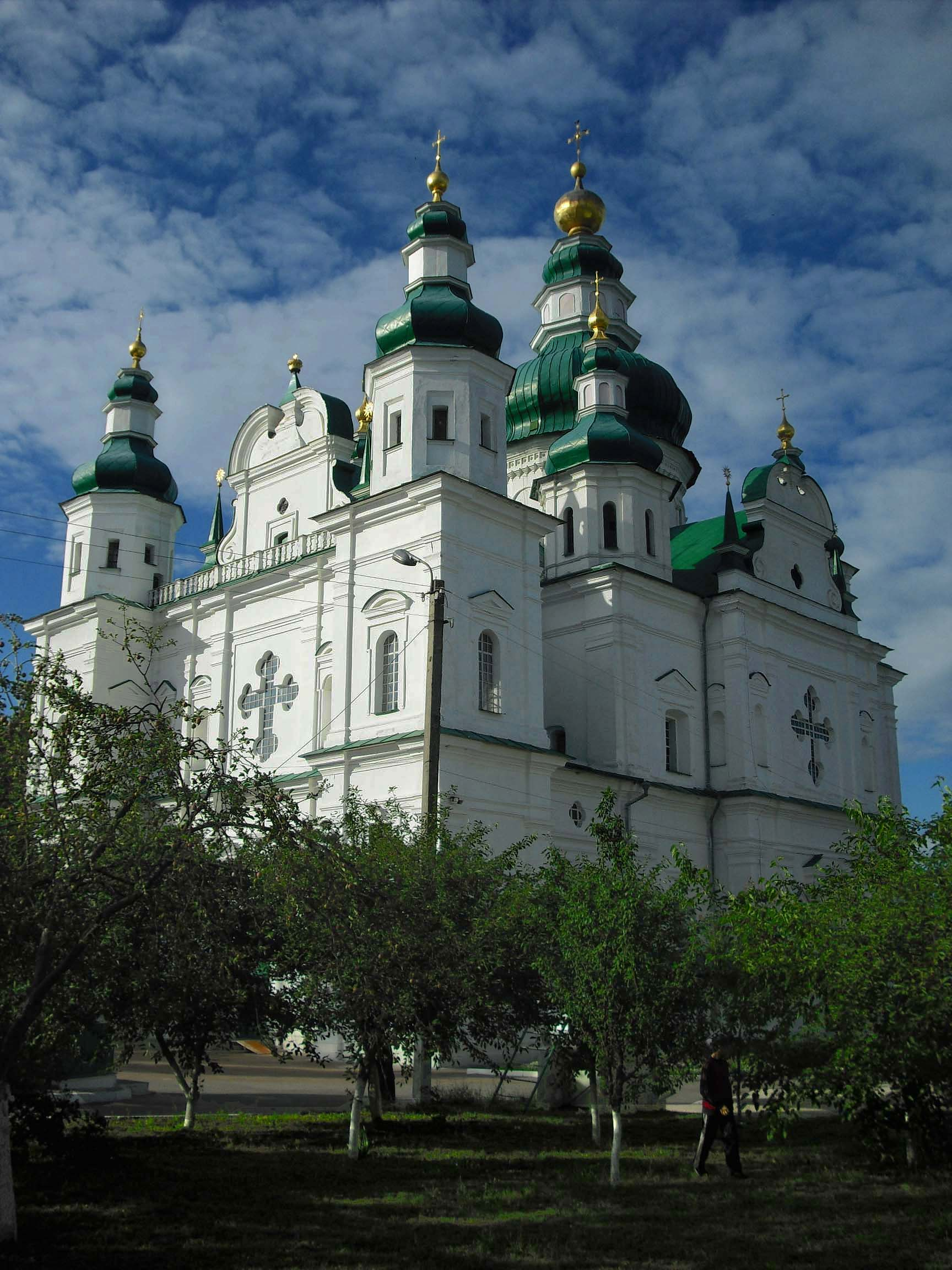
Trinity Cathedral, Chernihiv (1679-1695)

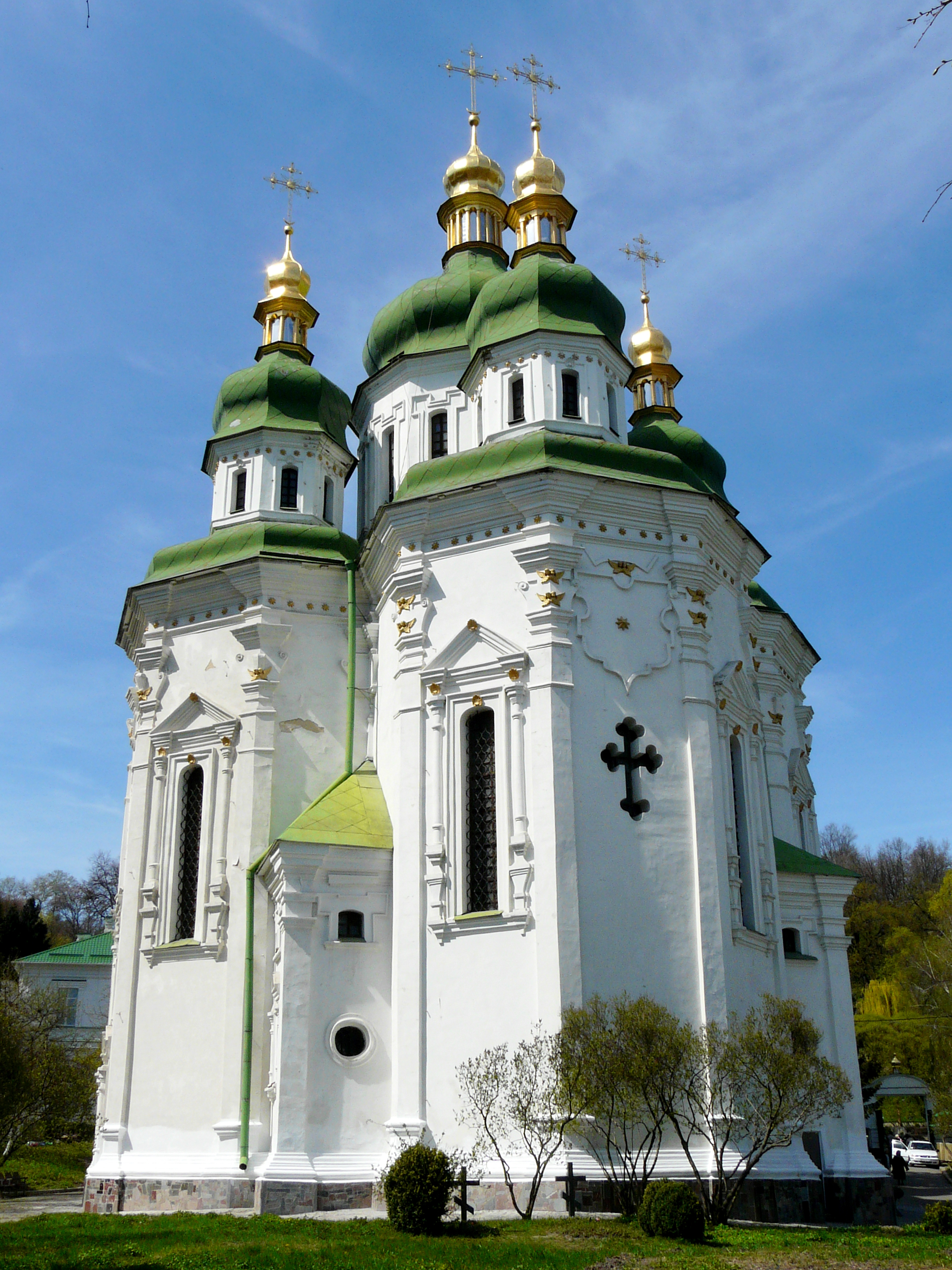
St. George's Cathedral, Vydubychi Monastery, Kyiv (1696)

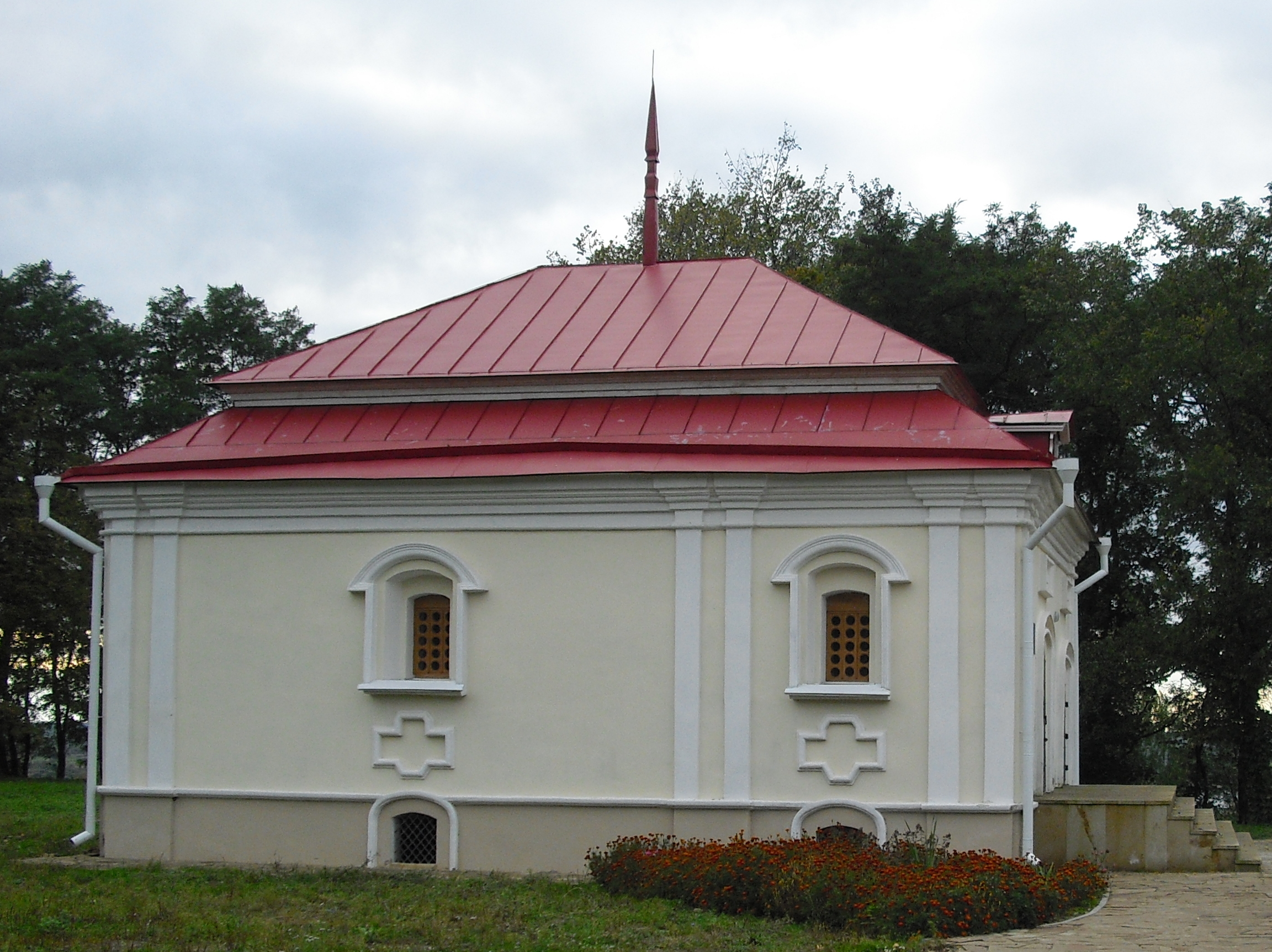
Polubotok's house, Liubech (early 18th century)

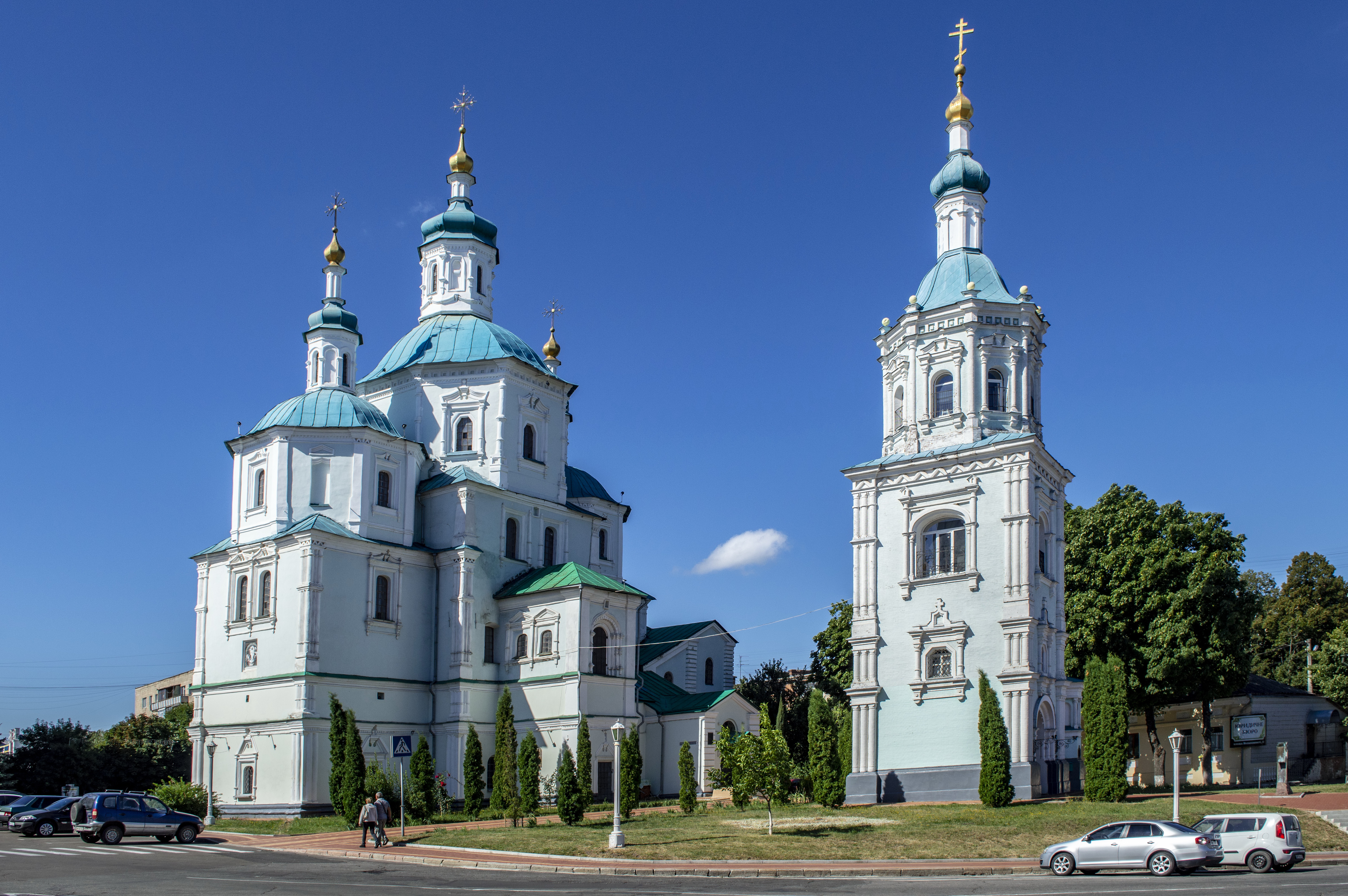
Resurrection Church, Sumy (1702)

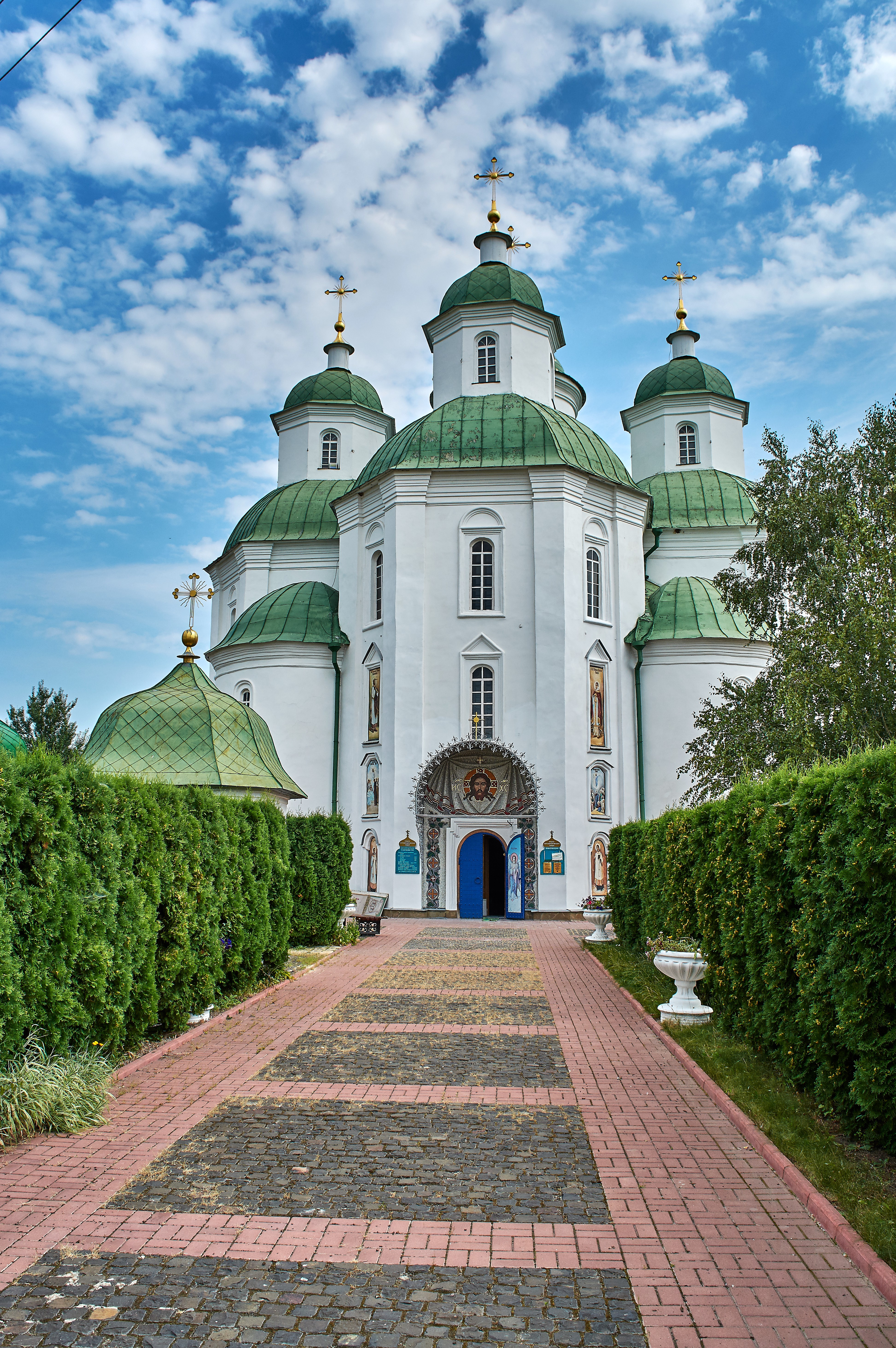
Transfiguration Cathedral, Pryluky (1710-1720)

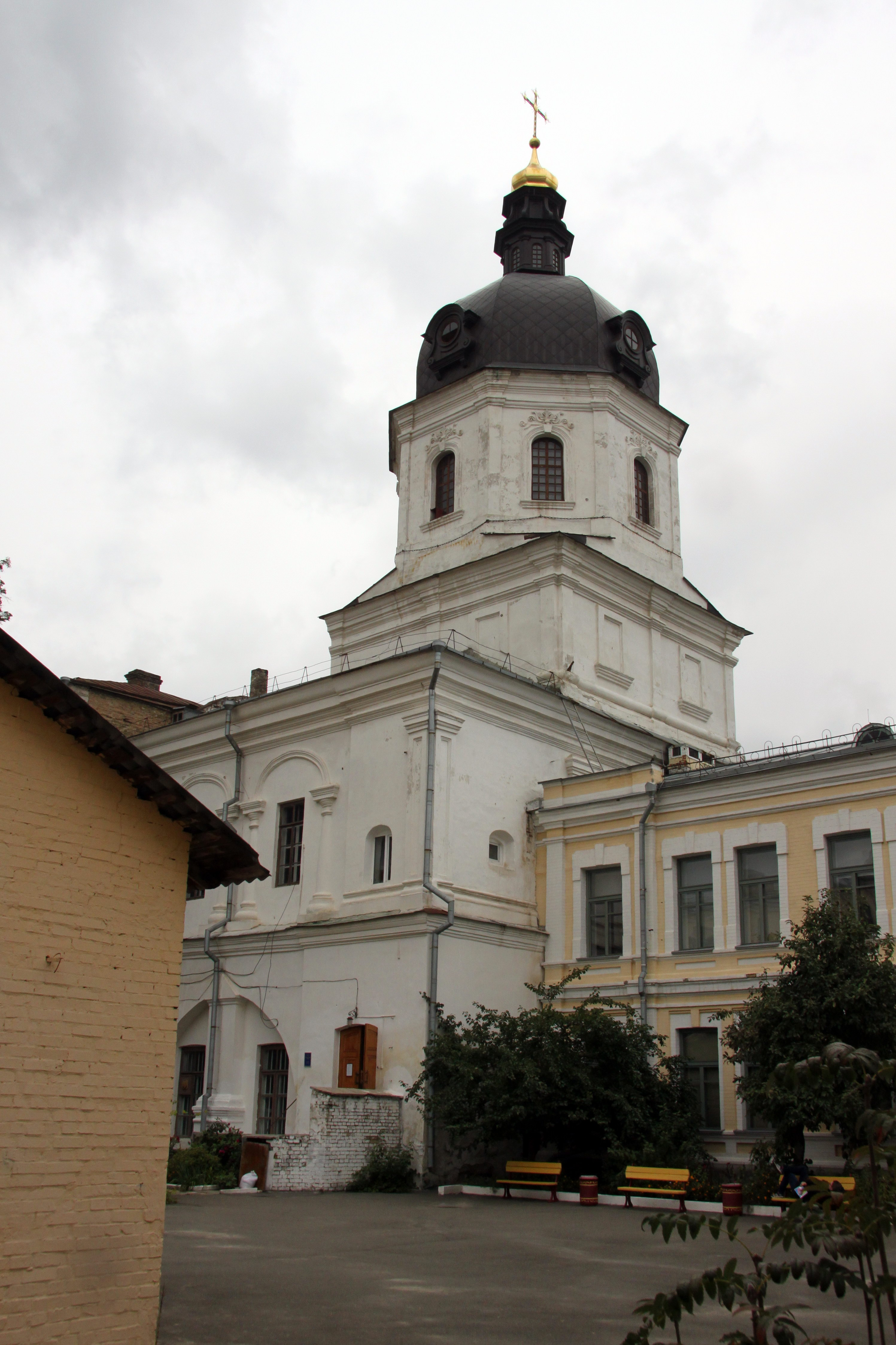
Annunciation Church of the Brotherhood Monastery, Kyiv (1740)

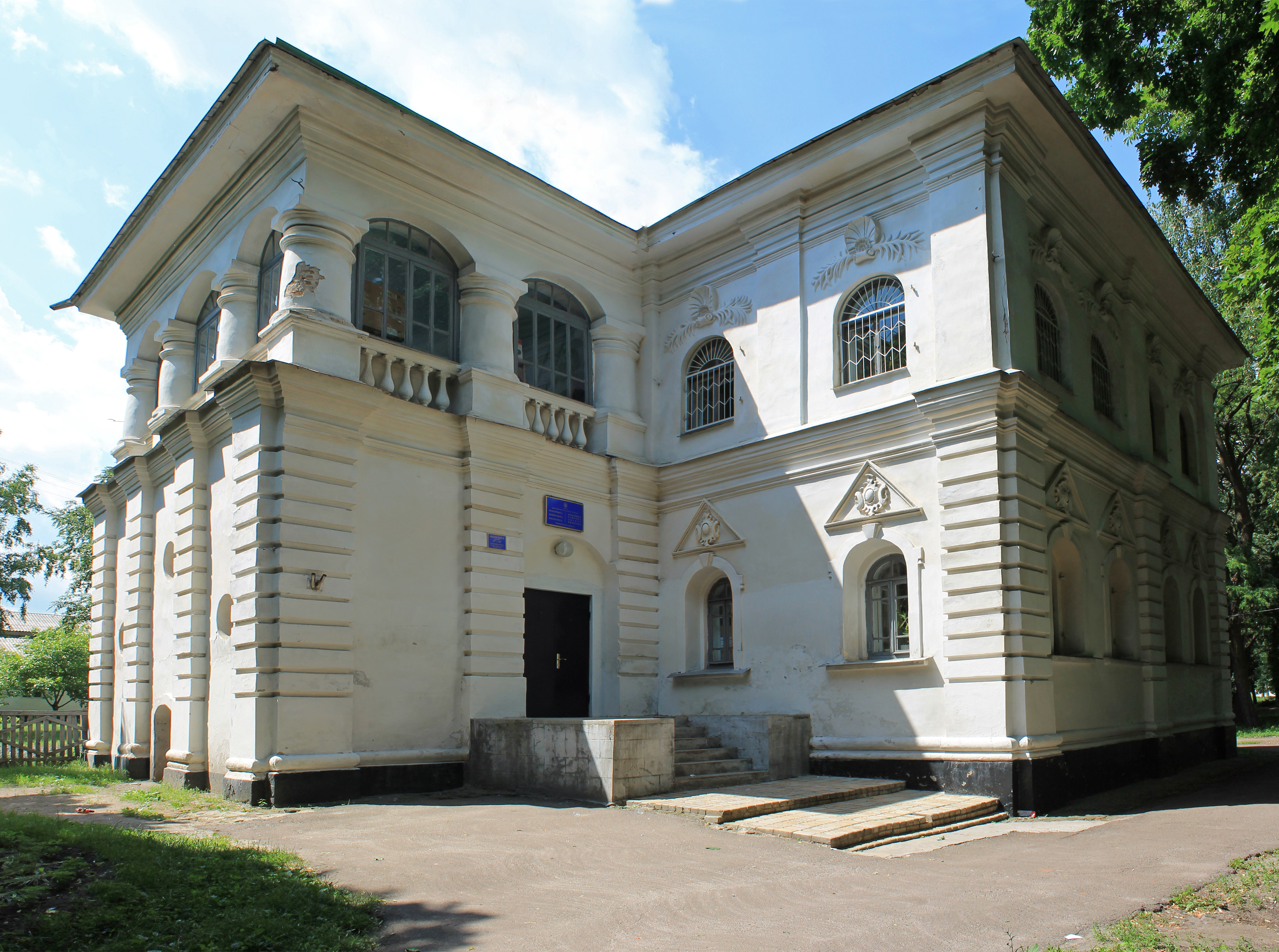
Regimental Chancellery building in Kozelets (1740-1760)

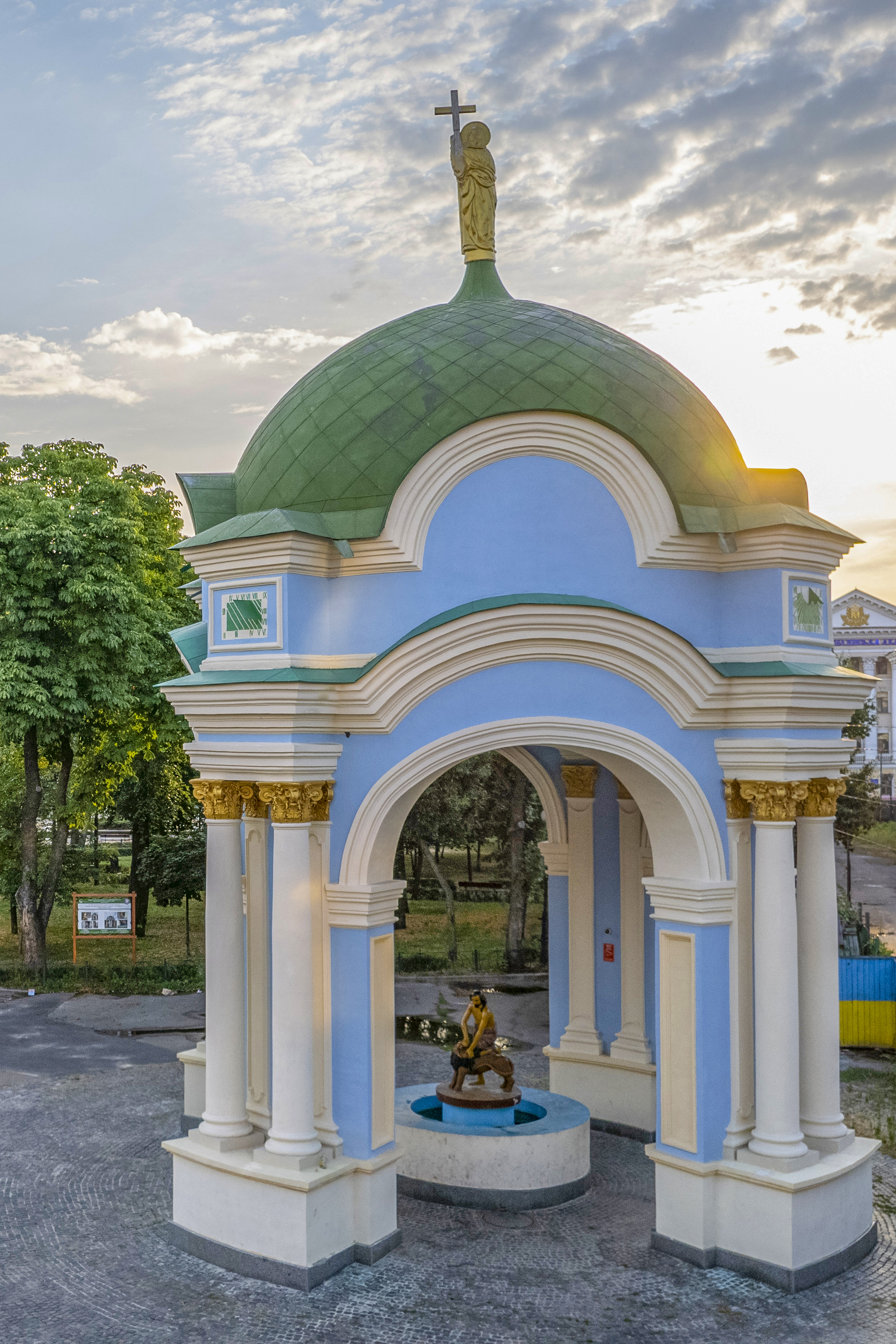
Samson Fountain in Kyiv (1748-1749, restored)

==== Western Ukraine ====
Examples of Western Baroque architecture (principally Polish and Vilnian) can be found mostly in western regions of Ukraine. Among them are castles in Zbarazh, Berezhany, Pidhirtsi, Bar (ruined) and Roman Catholic churches in Lviv and Kamianets-Podilskyi.

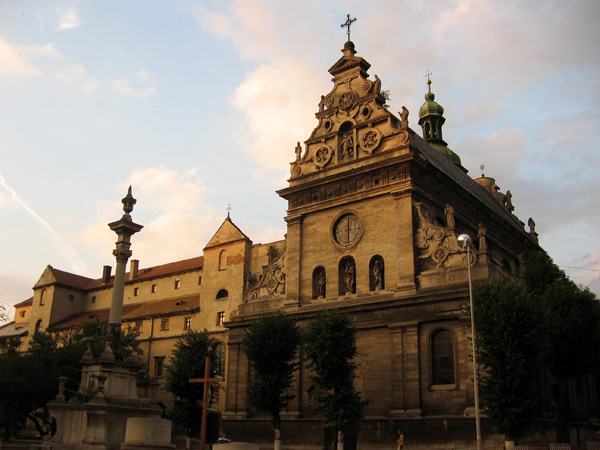
Bernardine Church, Lviv (1600-1630s)

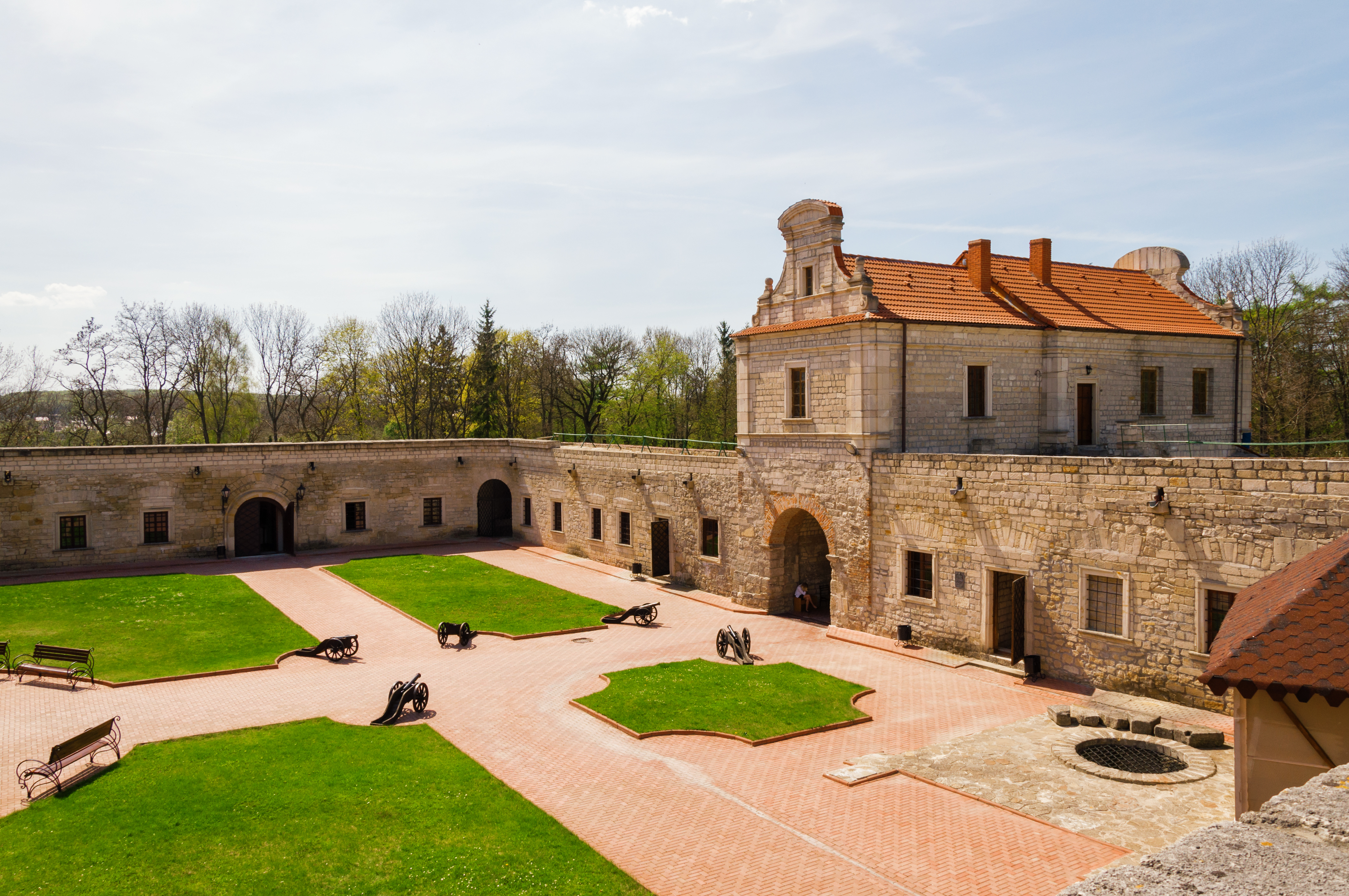
Gate of Zbarazh Castle (1626–1631)

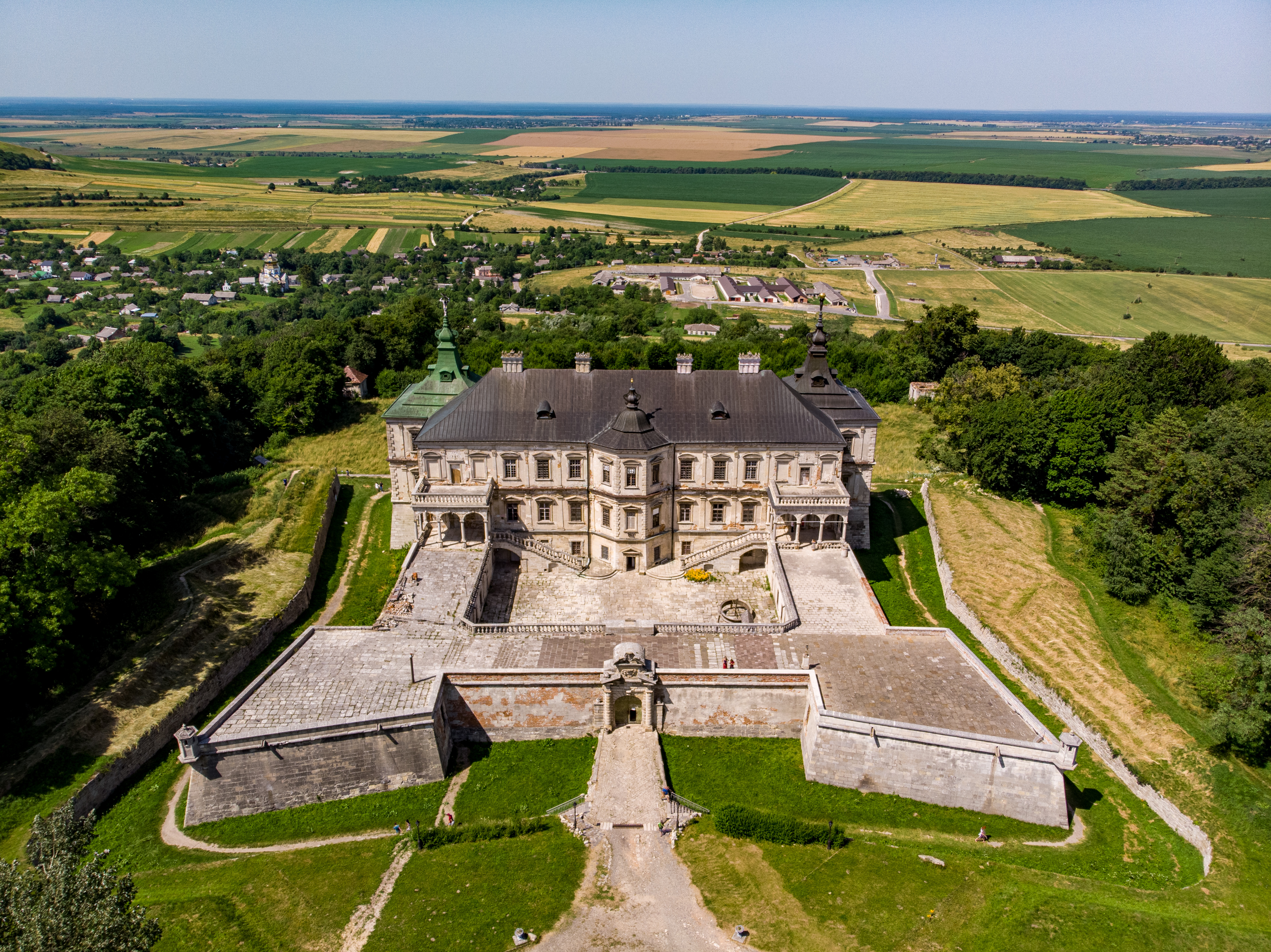
Pidhirtsi Castle (1635–1640)

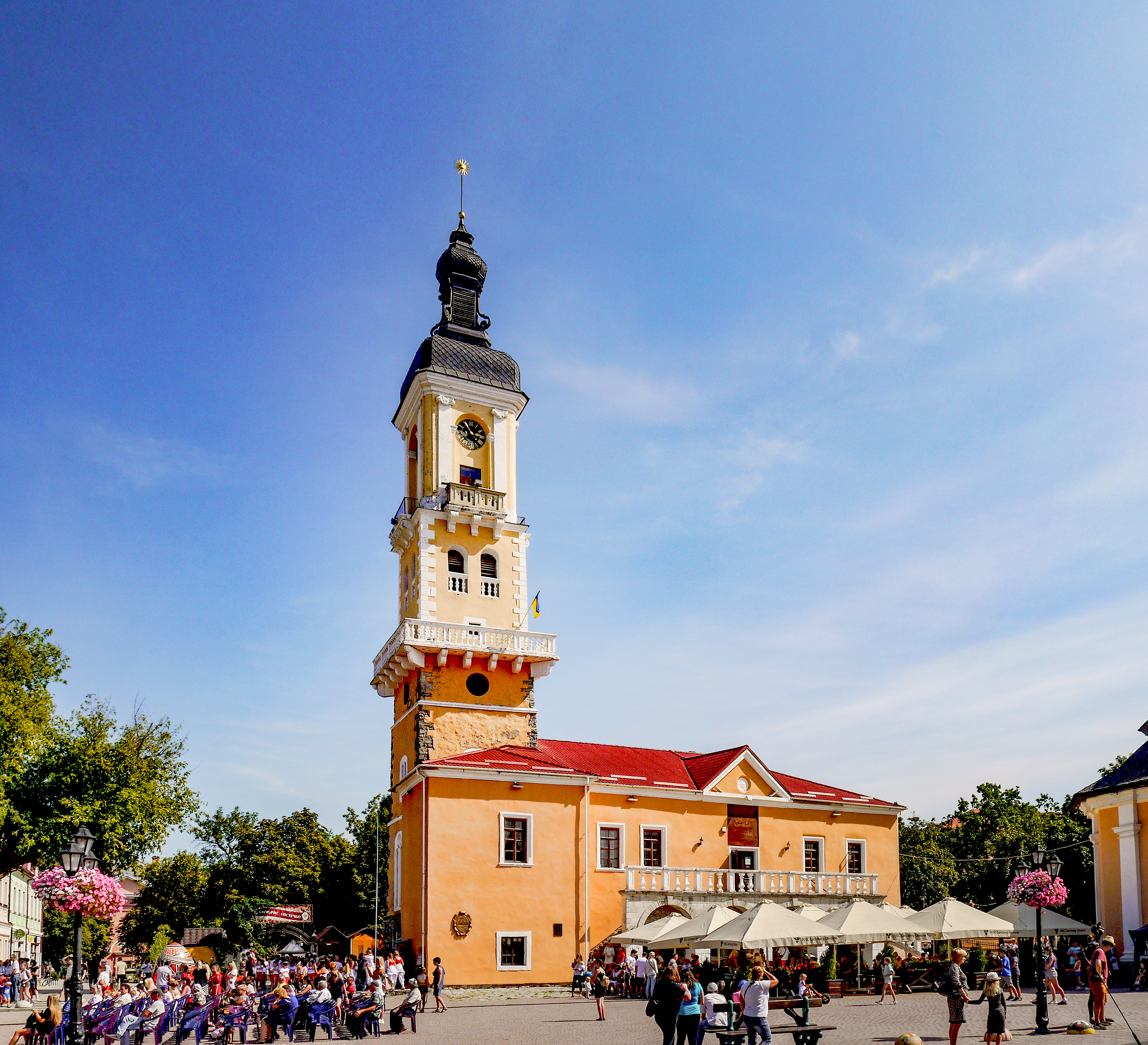
Kamianets-Podilskyi Town Hall (14-16th centuries, restored 1754)

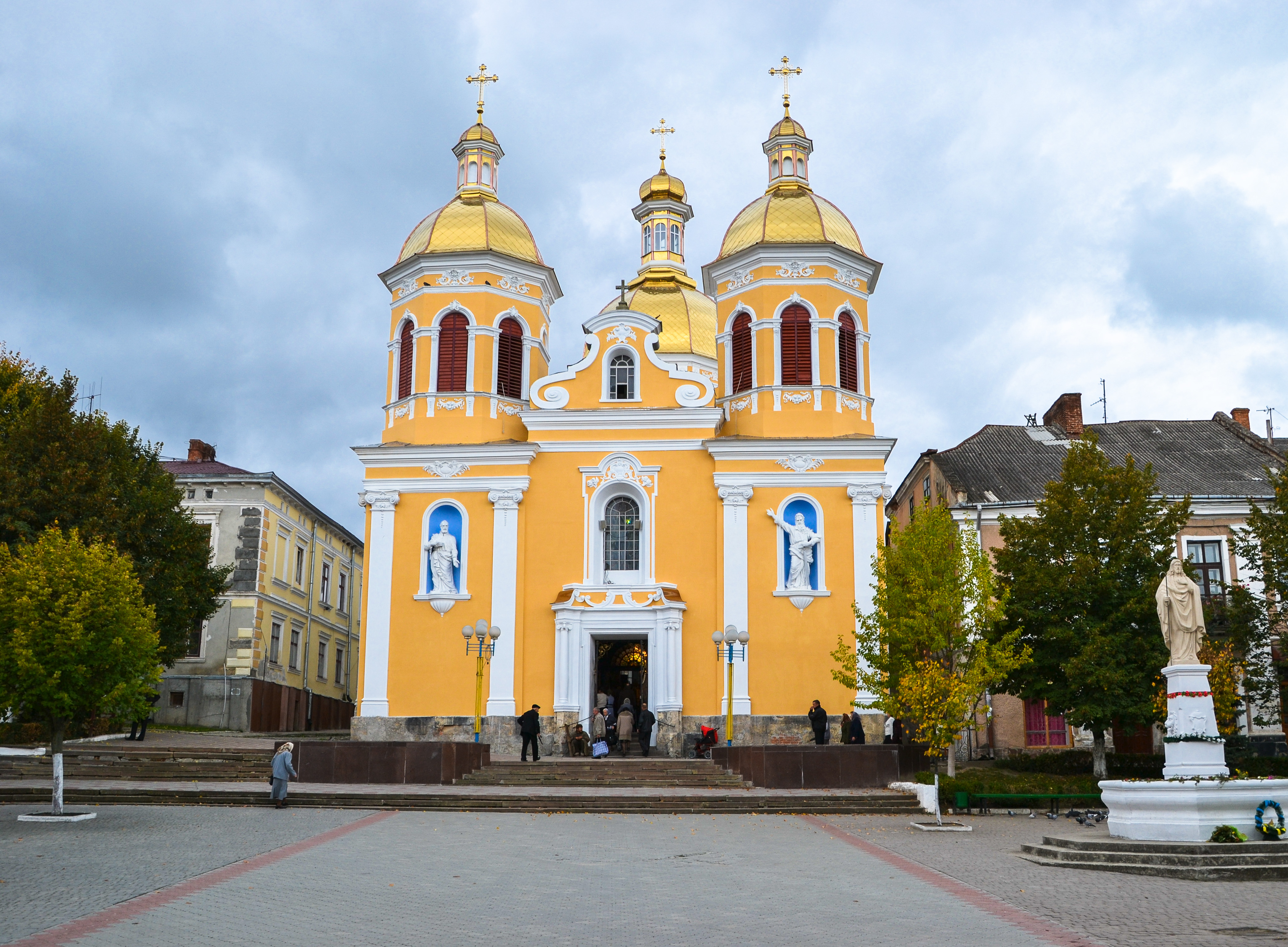
Trinity Cathedral, Berezhany (1768)

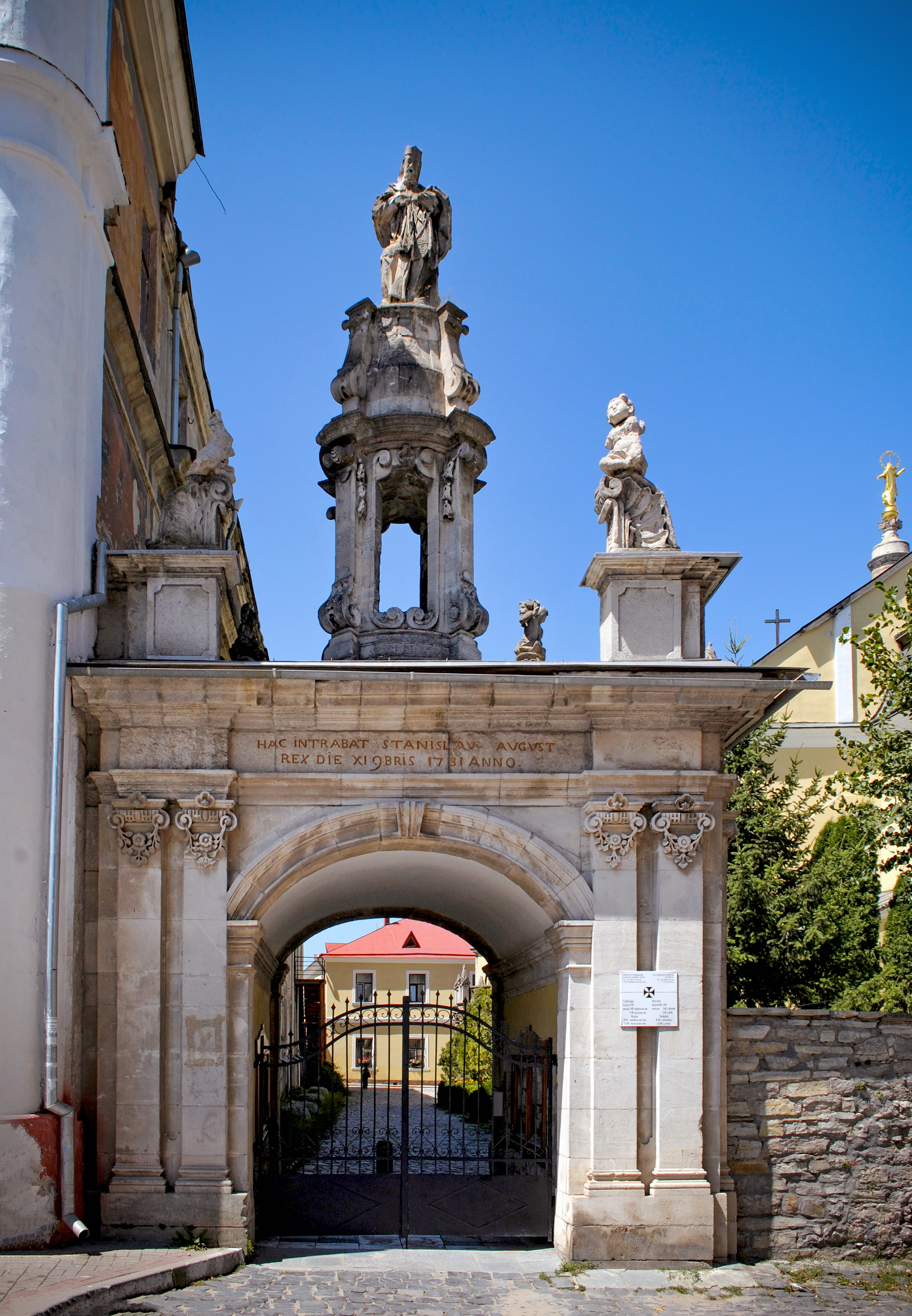
Entrance gate of the Sts. Peter and Paul Cathedral, Kamianets-Podilskyi (1781)

=== Imperial period ===
==== Late Baroque ====
As Eastern and Central Ukraine became increasingly integrated into the Russian Empire, Russian architects had the opportunity to realize their projects in the picturesque landscape that many Ukrainian cities and regions offered. St. Andrew's Church of Kyiv (1747–1754), built by Bartolomeo Rastrelli, is a notable example of Rococo architecture, and its location on top of the Kievan mountain made it a recognizable monument of the city. An equally notable contribution of Rastrelli was the Mariinskyi Palace, which was built to be a summer residence to Russian Empress Elizabeth.

A prominent architect of the late Baroque era in Ukraine was Gottfried Johann Schädel, who led the construction of the Great Belfry of Kyiv Pechersk Lavra (1736–1745) and rebuilt the premises of Kyiv Mohyla Academy (1736–1740). Other prominent monuments from this period in Ukraine are the belfries of St. Sophia Cathedral (1748) and St. Michael's Monastery in Kyiv, Intercession Church in Podil (1772), St. George's Cathedral in Lviv (1744–1764), City Hall in Buchach, Nativity Cathedral in Kozelets (1752–1763), main cathedral of Pochaiv Lavra (1771–1791), Dominican Church in Lviv (1749–1764).

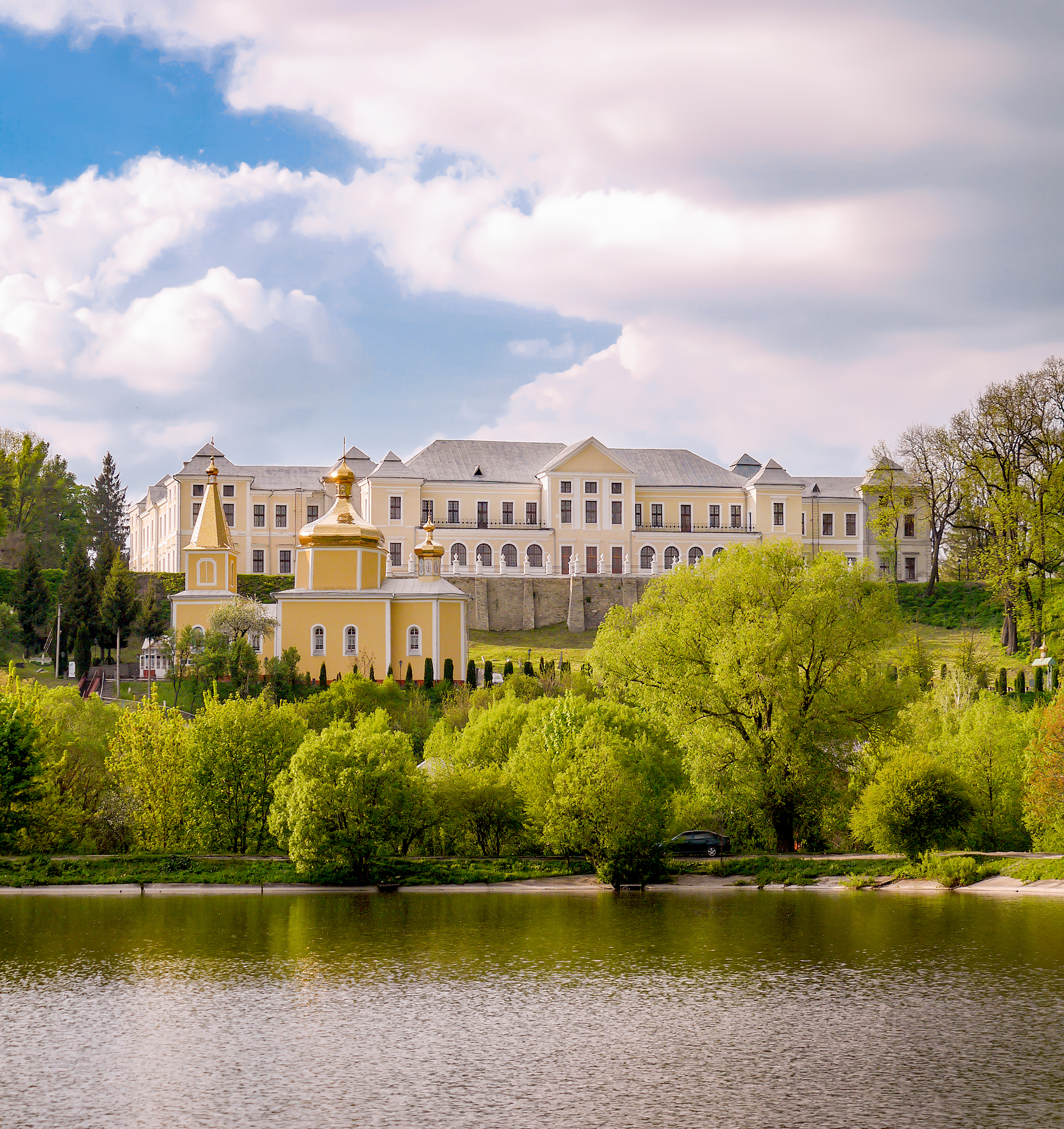
Vyshnivets Palace (1730s)

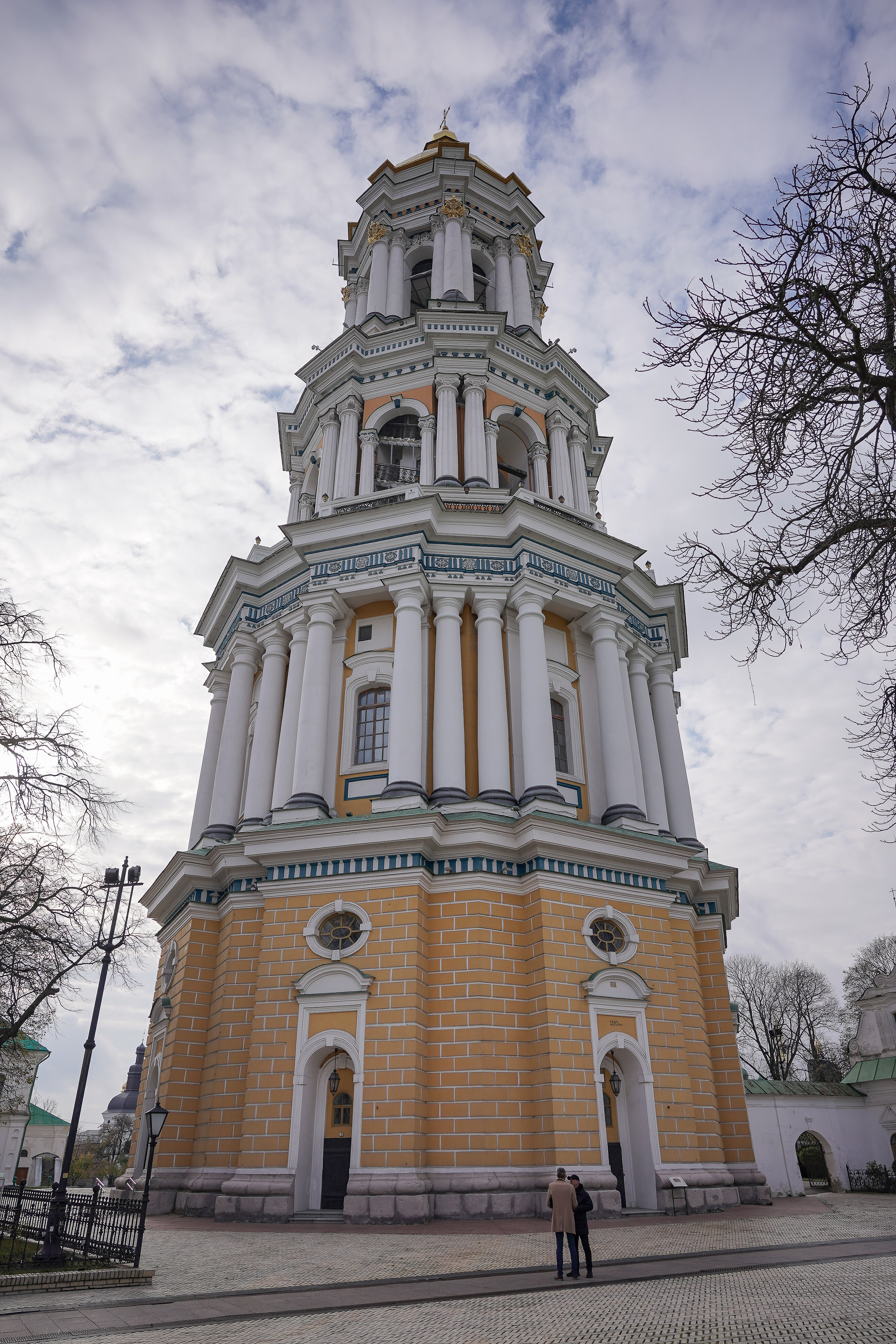
Great Lavra Bell Tower constructed by Johann Gottfried Schädel (1731-1745)

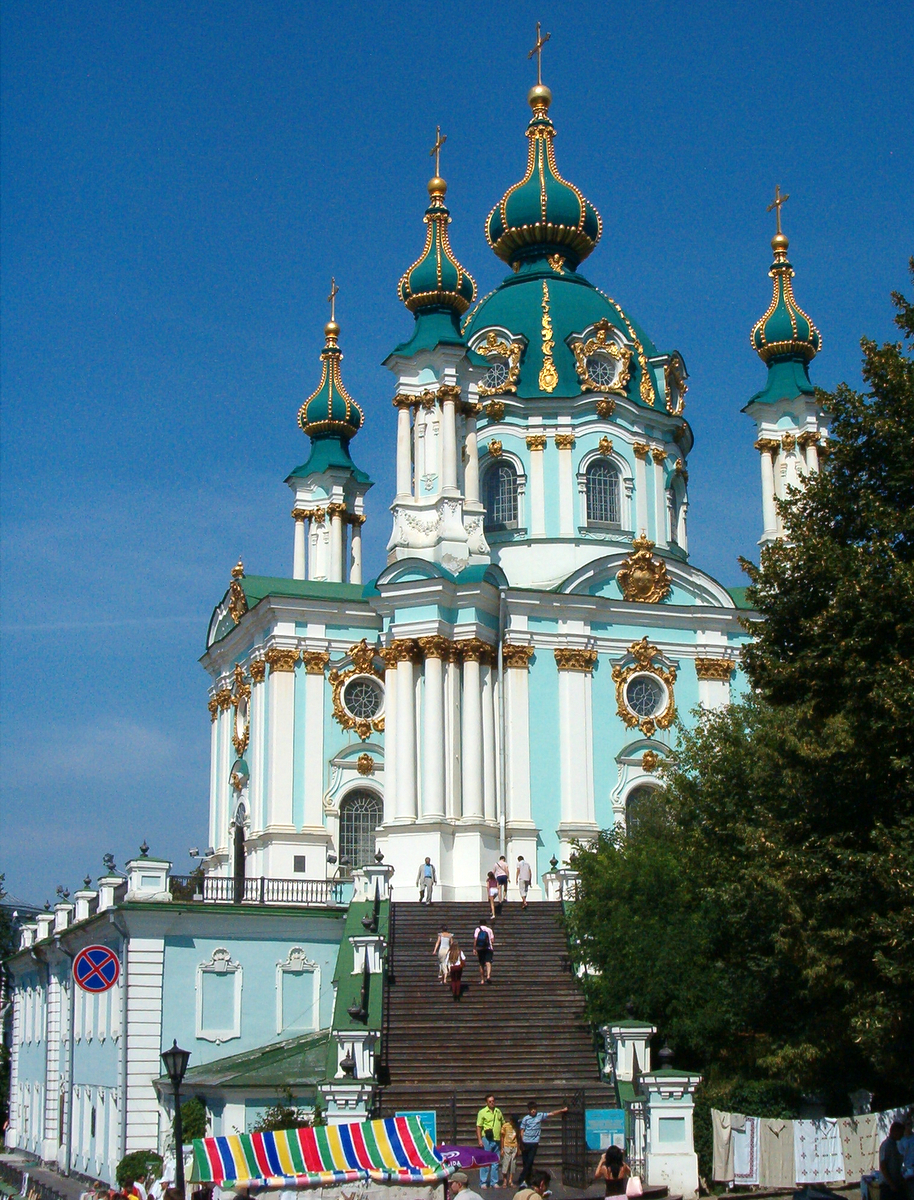
St Andrew's Church, Kyiv (1747–1754), an example of Elizabethan Baroque architecture

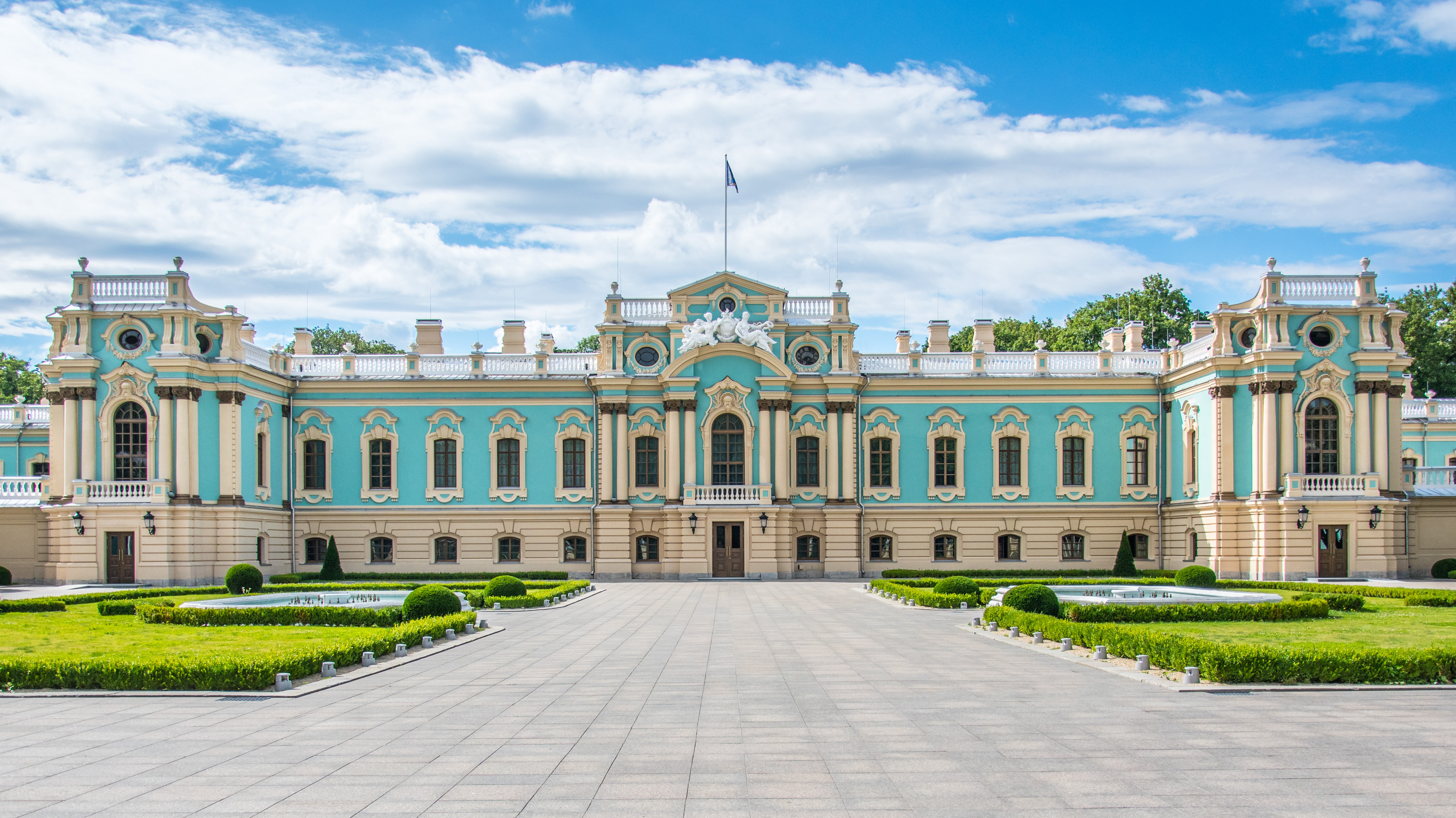
Mariinskyi Palace, Kyiv (1744-1752)

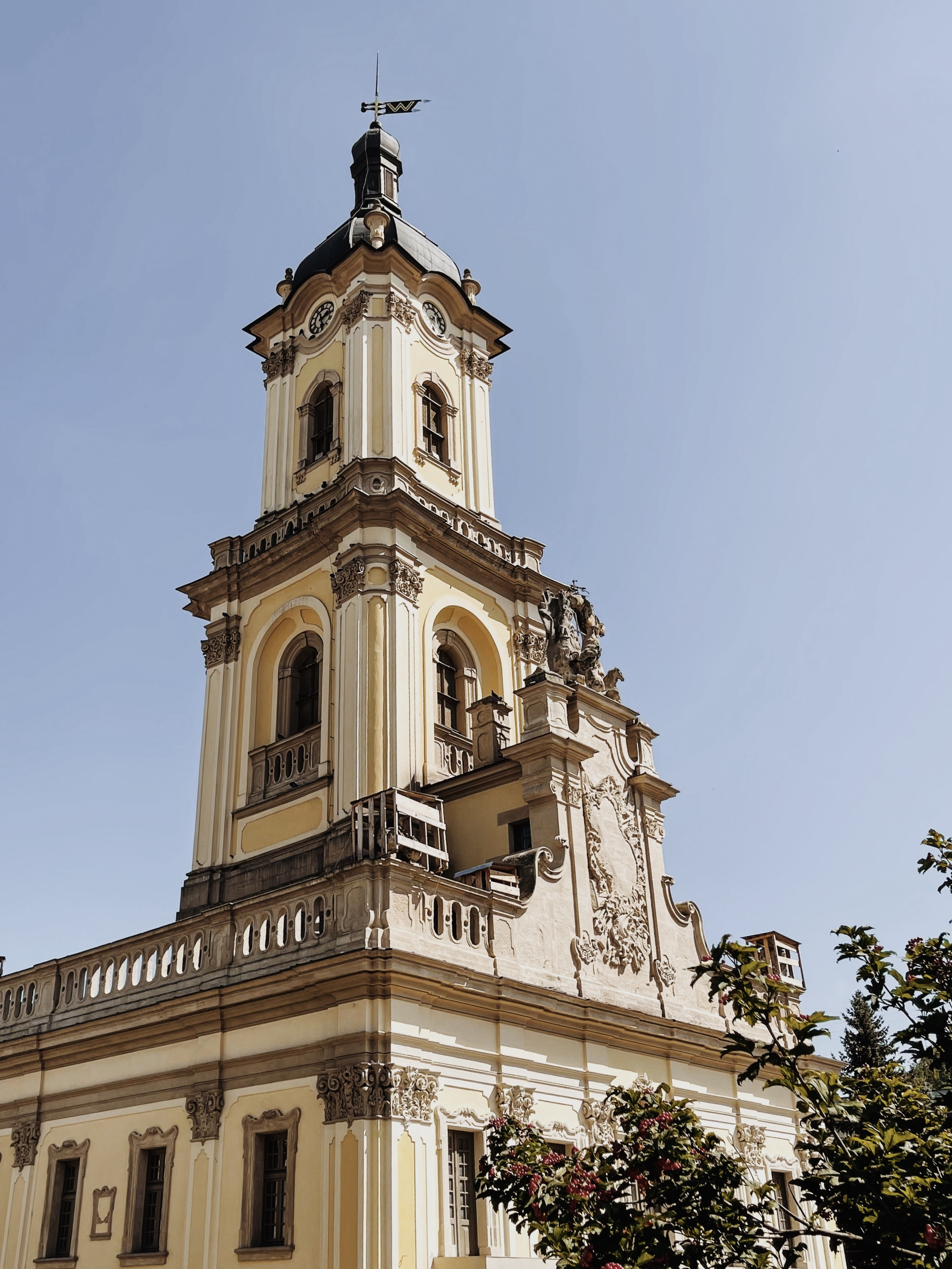
Buchach City Hall (1743-1758)

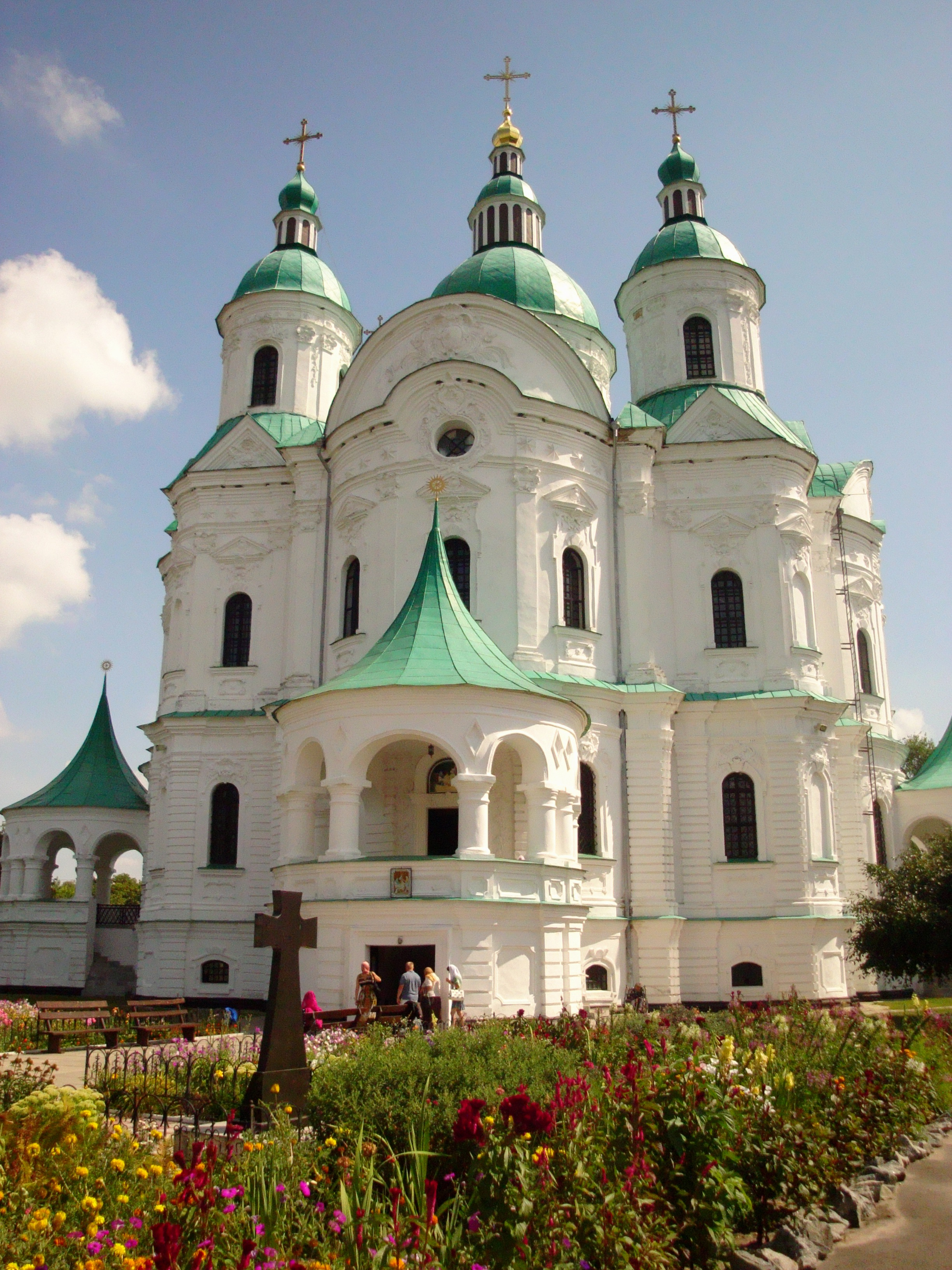
Nativity Cathedral, Kozelets (1752-1763)

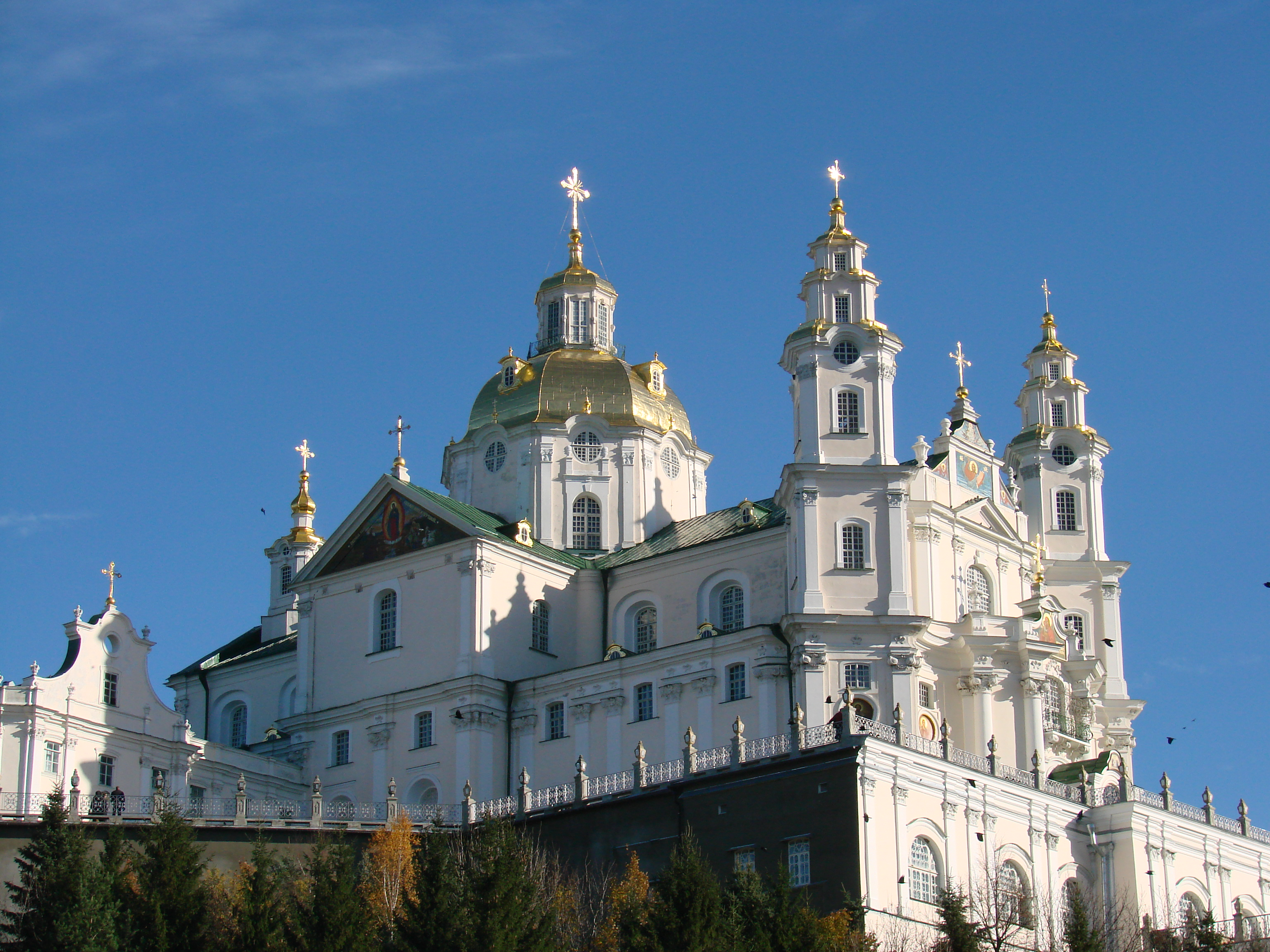
Dormition Cathedral of Pochaiv Lavra (1771-1791)

==== Classicism ====
Russia, winning successive wars over the Ottoman Empire and its vassal Crimean Khanate, eventually annexed the whole south of Ukraine and Crimea. Renamed New Russia, these lands were to be colonized, and new cities such as the Mykolaiv, Odesa, Kherson and Sevastopol were founded. These would contain notable examples of Imperial Russian architecture. During the reign of the last Hetman of Ukraine, Kirill Razumovsky, many of the Cossack Hetmanate's towns such as Hlukhiv, Baturyn and Kozelets had grandiose projects built by the appointed architect of Little Russia, Andrey Kvasov. Among notable structures built under Razumovsky's rule which have been preserved to our times are palaces in Yahotyn and Baturyn. Other examples of classicist architecture of this era in Ukraine include the palaces in Vyshnivets and Kachanivka, Mykolaiv Observatory, Transfiguration Monastery in Novhorod-Siverskyi, and Samchyky Manor.

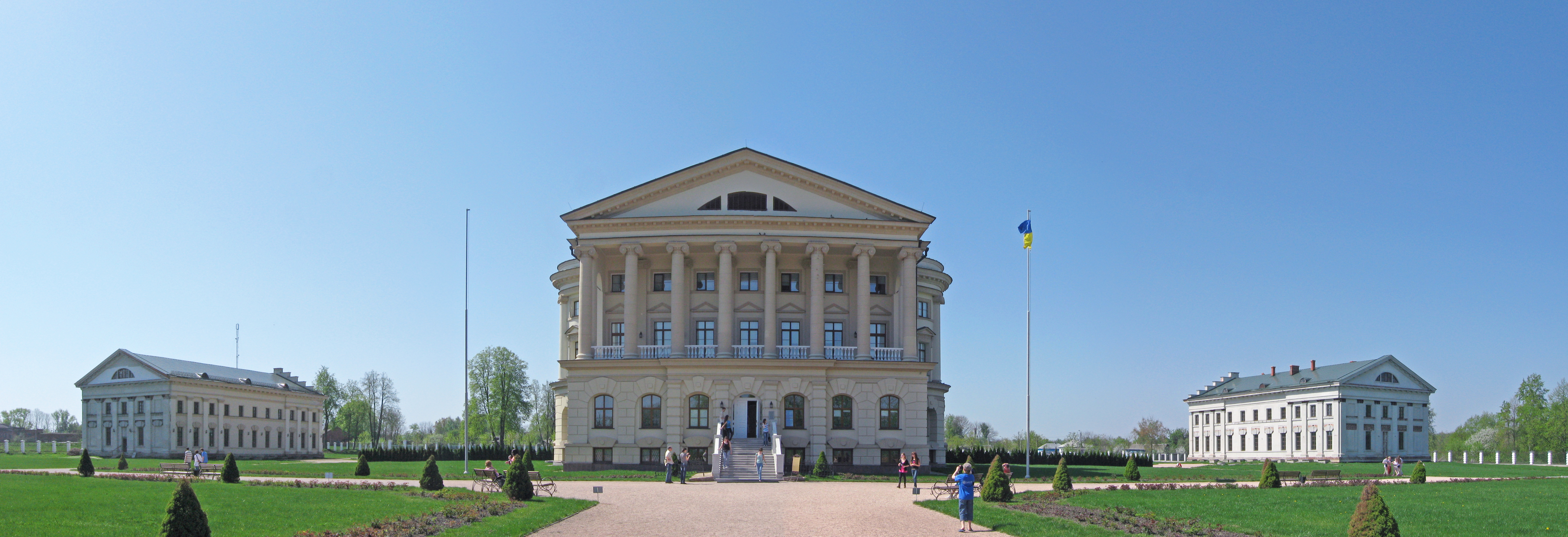
Razumovsky Palace in Baturyn (1799-1803)

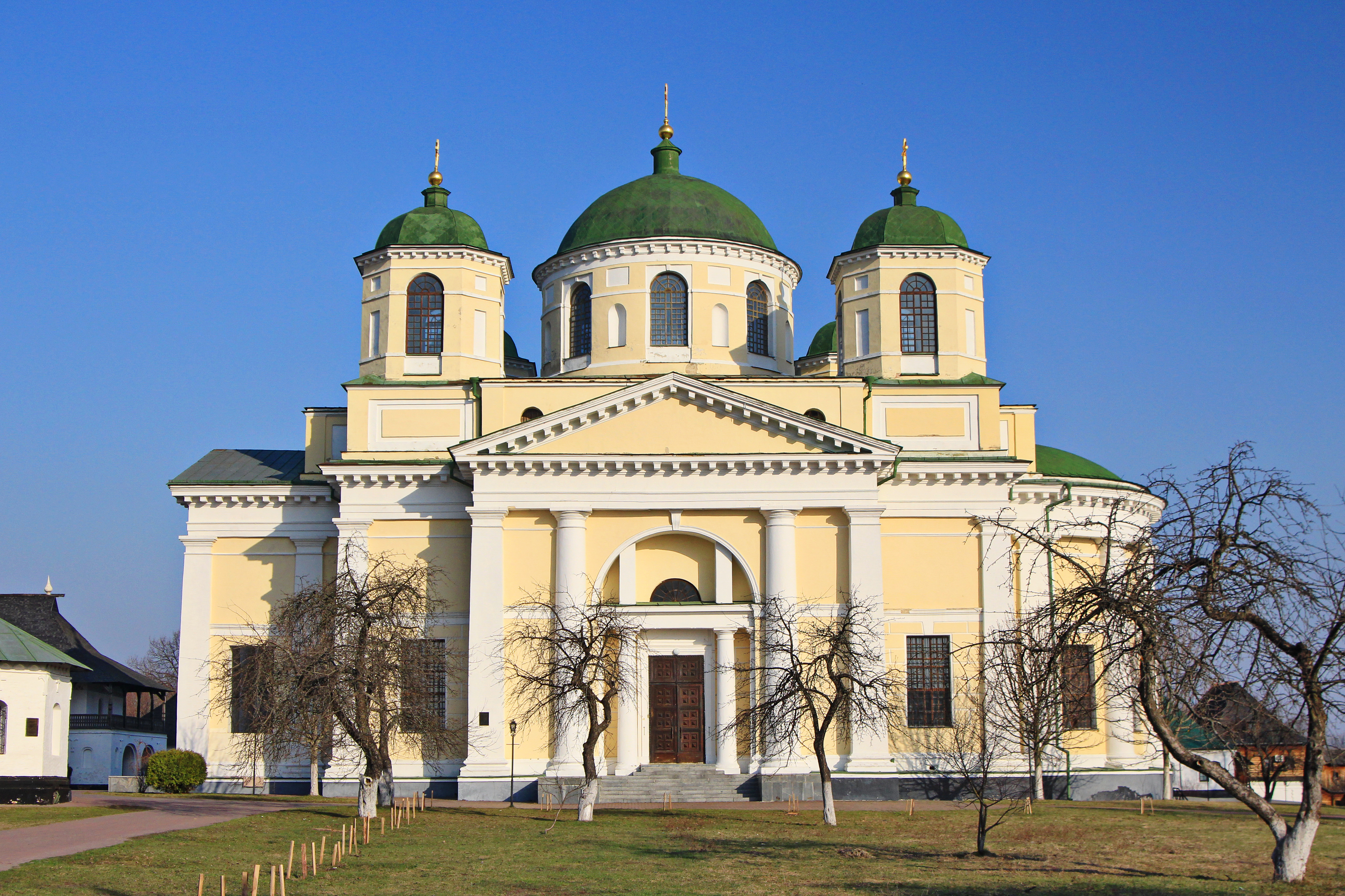
Transfiguration Cathedral, Novhorod-Siverskyi (1791-1806)

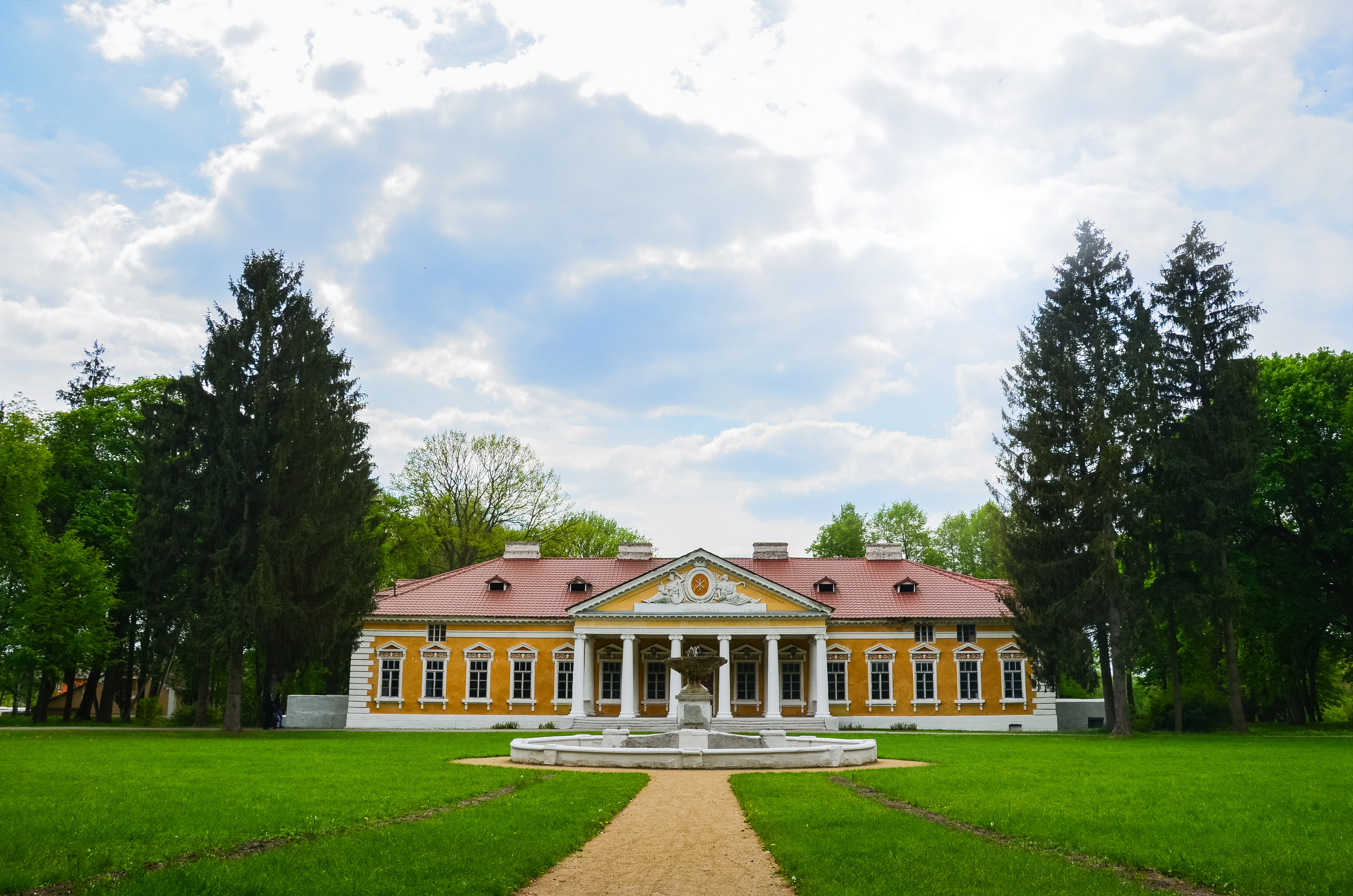
Samchyky Manor (early 19th century)

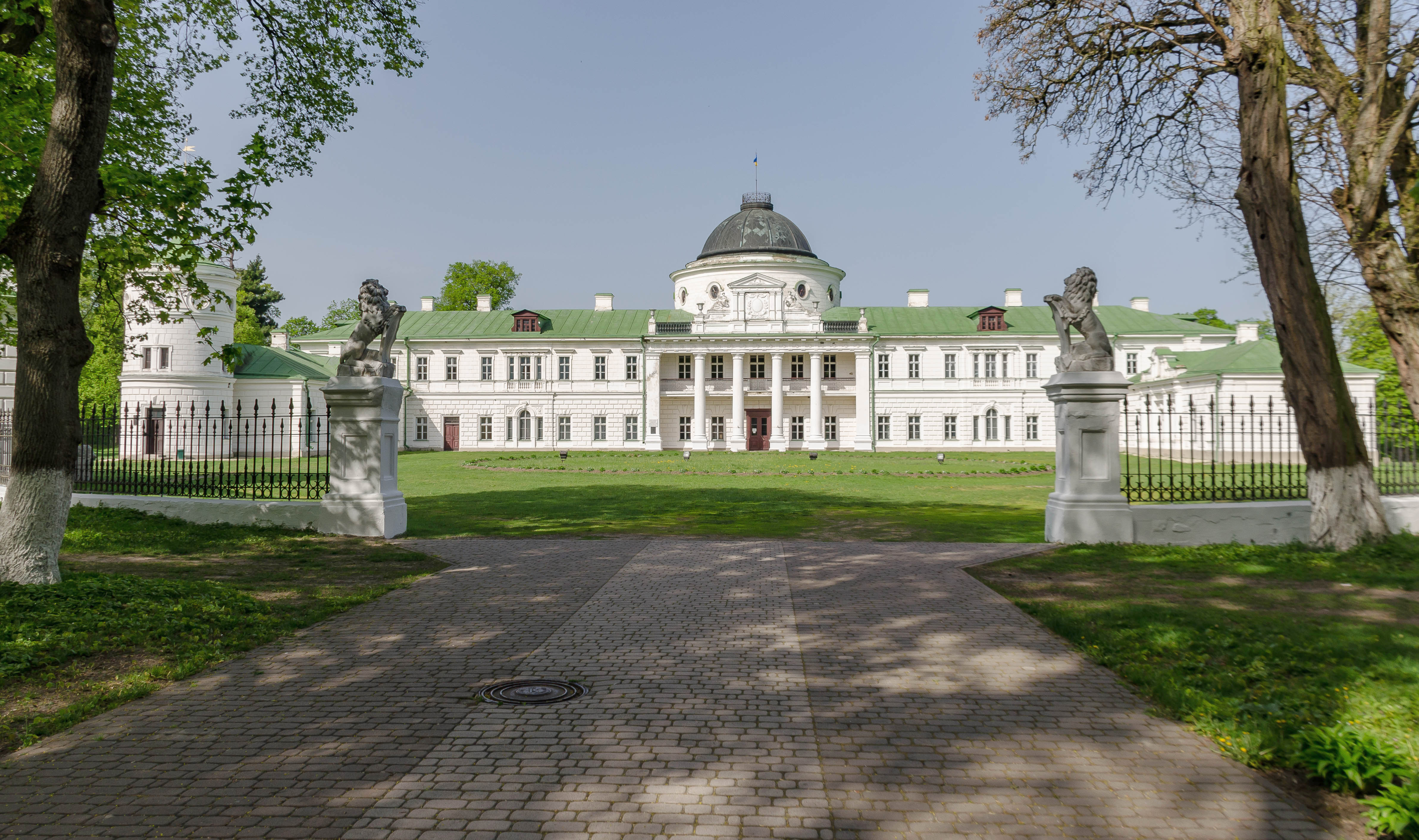
Kachanivka palace complex (1770-1824)

==== Empire style, Eclecticism and Historicism ====
During the early 19th century a new popular direction of architecture in Ukrainian lands was represented by Empire style. Prominent structures in this style are the Contracts House, Askold Grave Church and Monument to the Magdeburg Rights in Kyiv, all constructed according to the projects of Andrey Melensky, churches in Khorol, Romny, Lubny, Pyriatyn and Pryluky, belfry of the Dormition Cathedral in Kharkiv (1844), city halls in Kharkiv, Kyiv, Poltava, Lviv, Chernivtsi, Kamianets-Podilskyi.

After the ban on use of native Ukrainian styles in construction of churches, which was introduced by the Russian imperial government in 1801, Ukrainian architecture was dominated by classical projects approved by authorities in Moscow and Saint Petersburg. Elements of Ukrainian national style were better preserved in Western Ukrainian lands. 19th-century architecture in major Ukrainian cities such as Kyiv, Odesa, Kharkiv, Lviv, Chernivtsi and Kherson developed under the influence of Eclecticism, Renaissance Revival and other popular European styles. Under the influence of Romantic ideas, in the latter half of the 19th century the so-called Russo-Byzantine style became popular, especially in church architecture. Major buildings which belong to this style include the Saint Vladimir Cathedral in Chersonesus, the rebuilt Church of the Tithes and St. Volodymyr's Cathedral in Kyiv, reconstruction of the Dormition Cathedral in Volodymyr, and Annunciation Cathedral in Kharkiv.

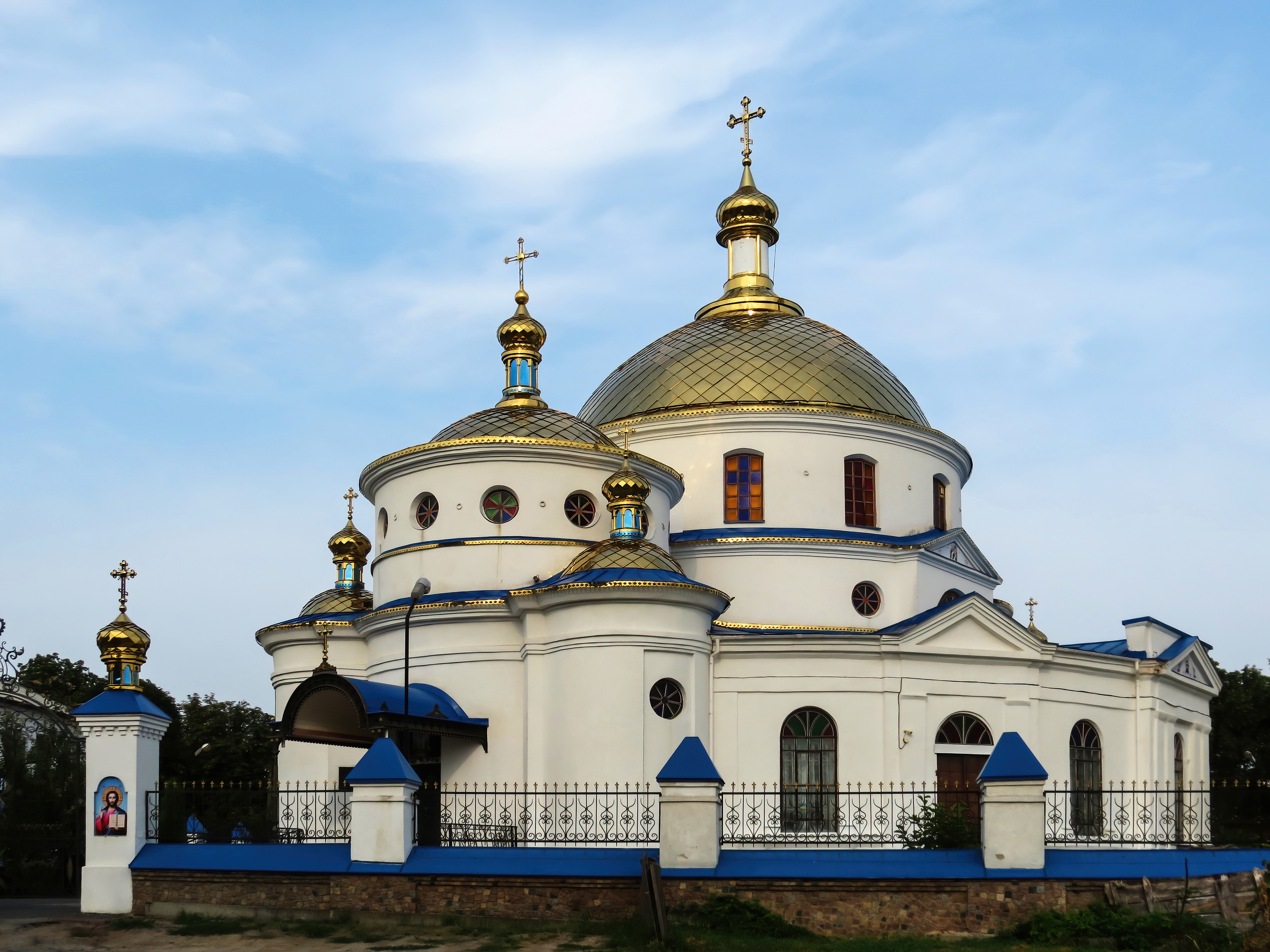
Ascension Church, Romny (1795-1801)

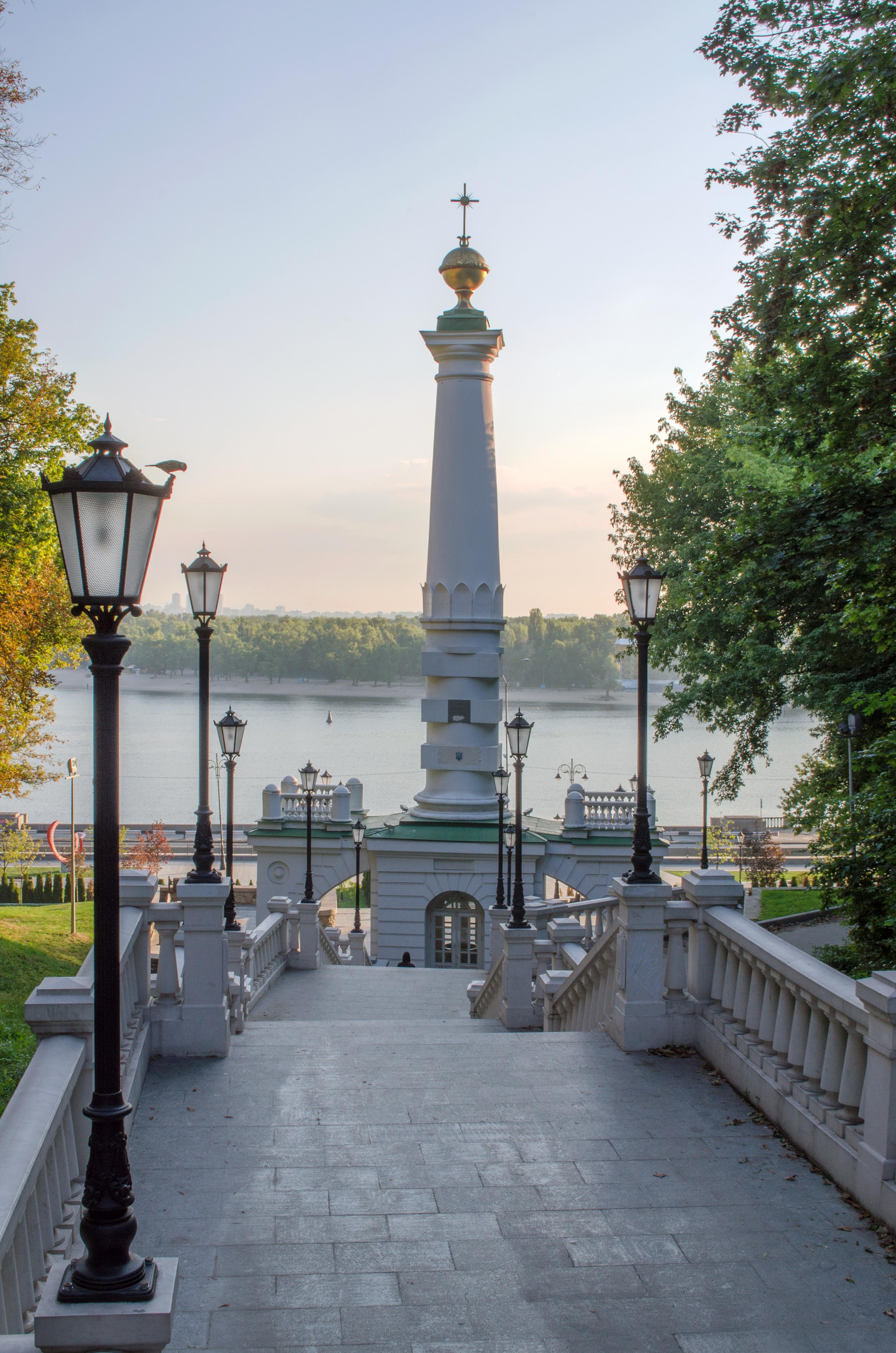
Magdeburg Law Monument, Kyiv (1802)

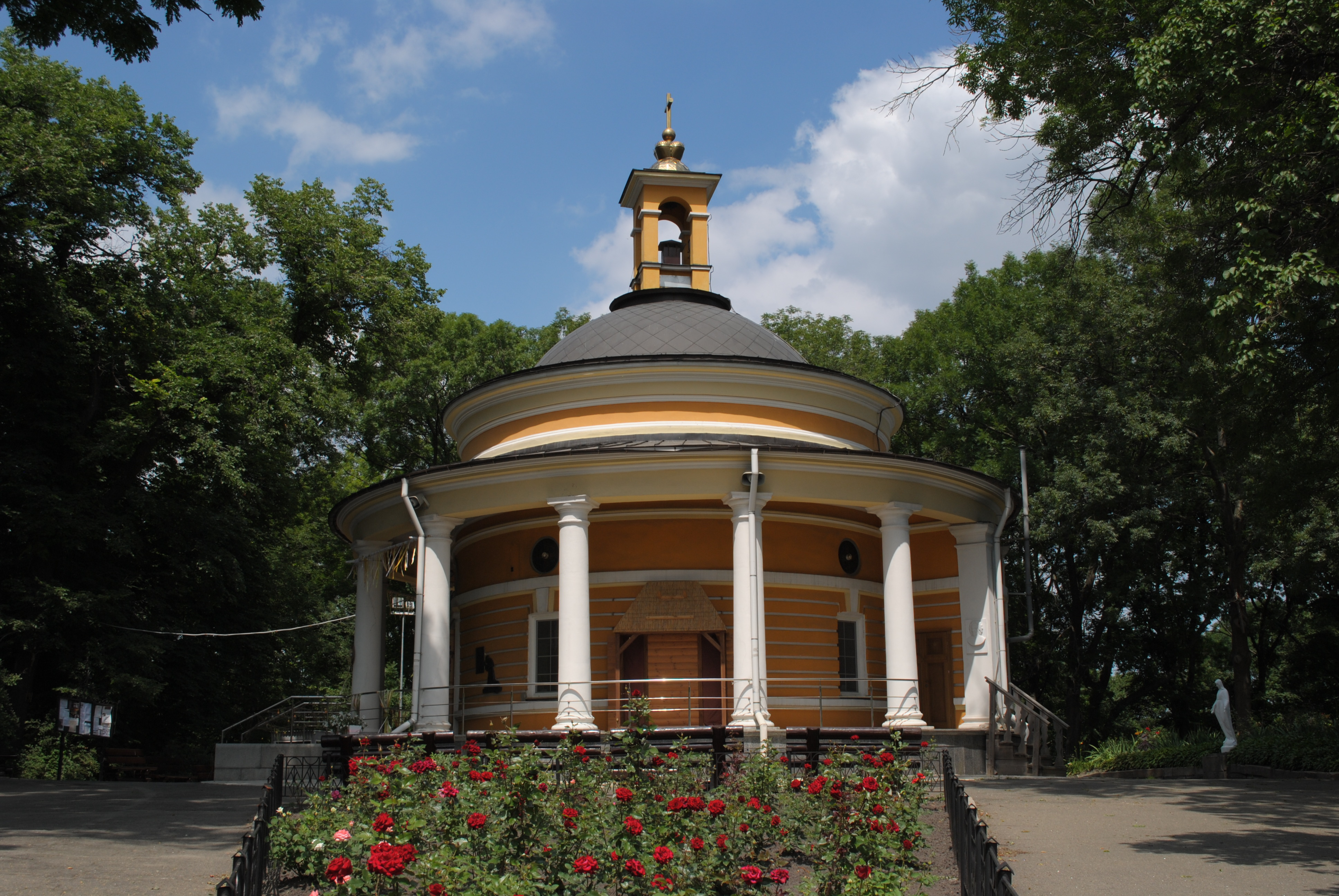
St. Nicholas Church at Askold's Grave, Kyiv (1809–1810)

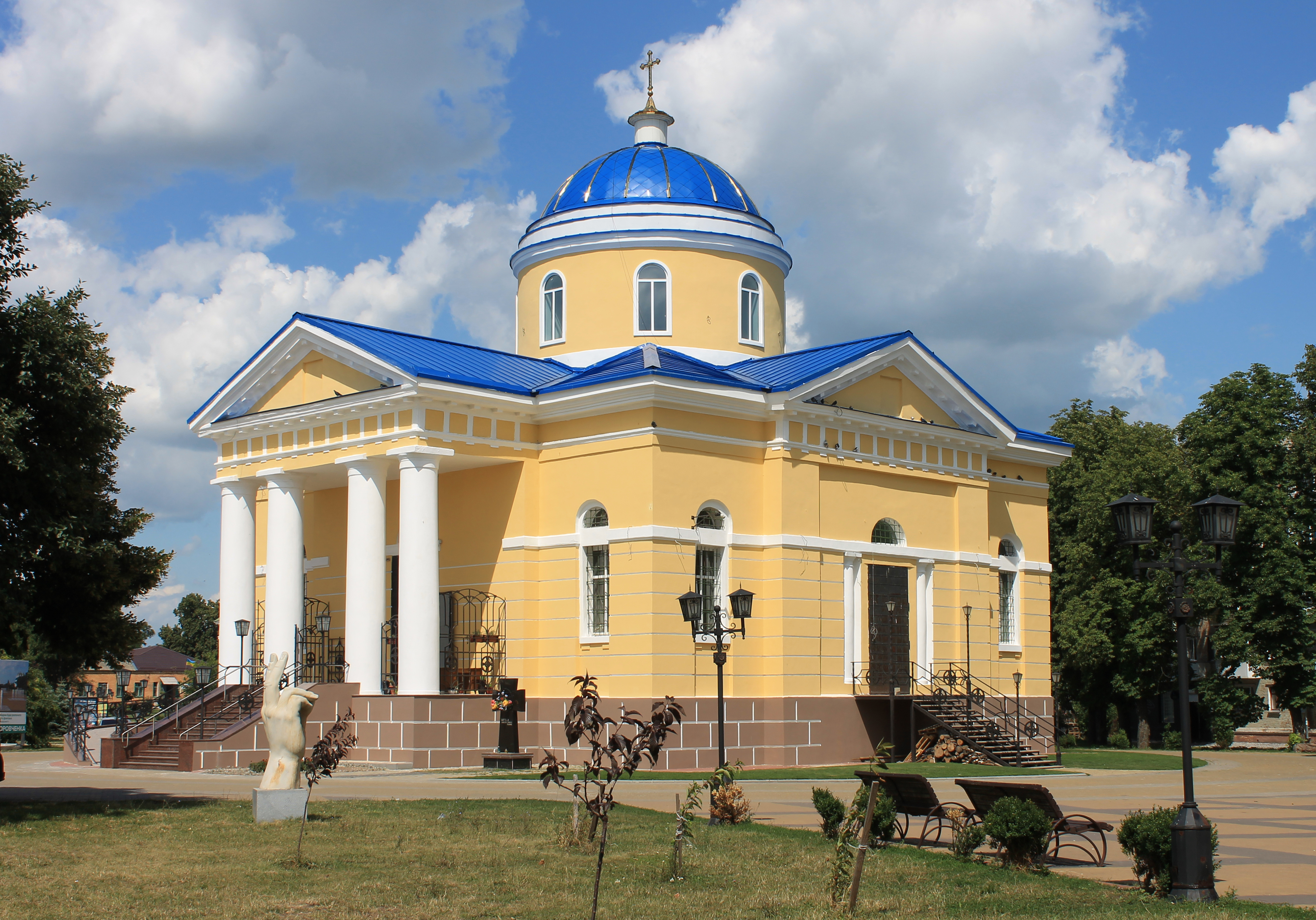
Church of Nativity of the Theotokos, Pryluky (1806-1815)

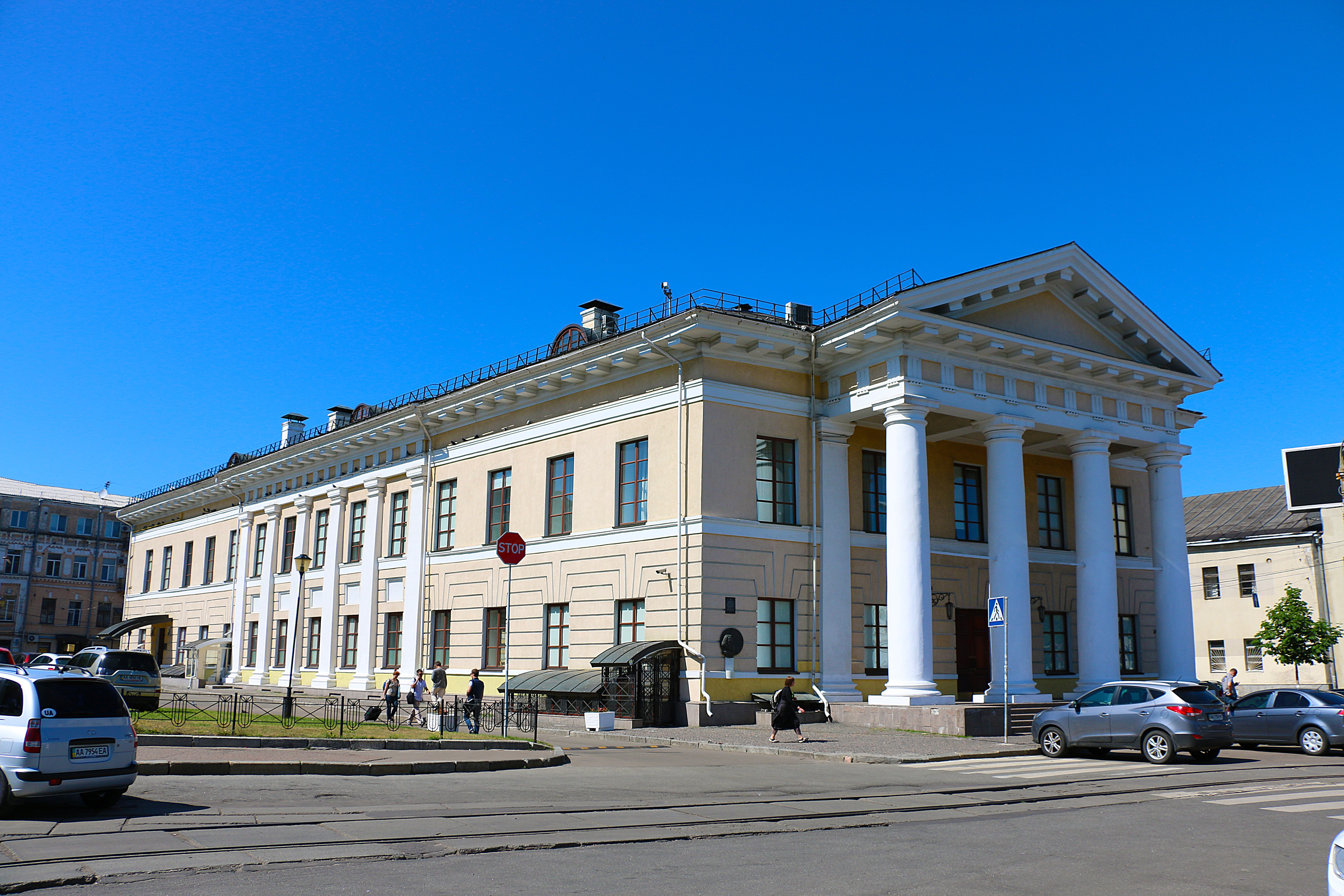
Contracts House in Kyiv (1815–1817)

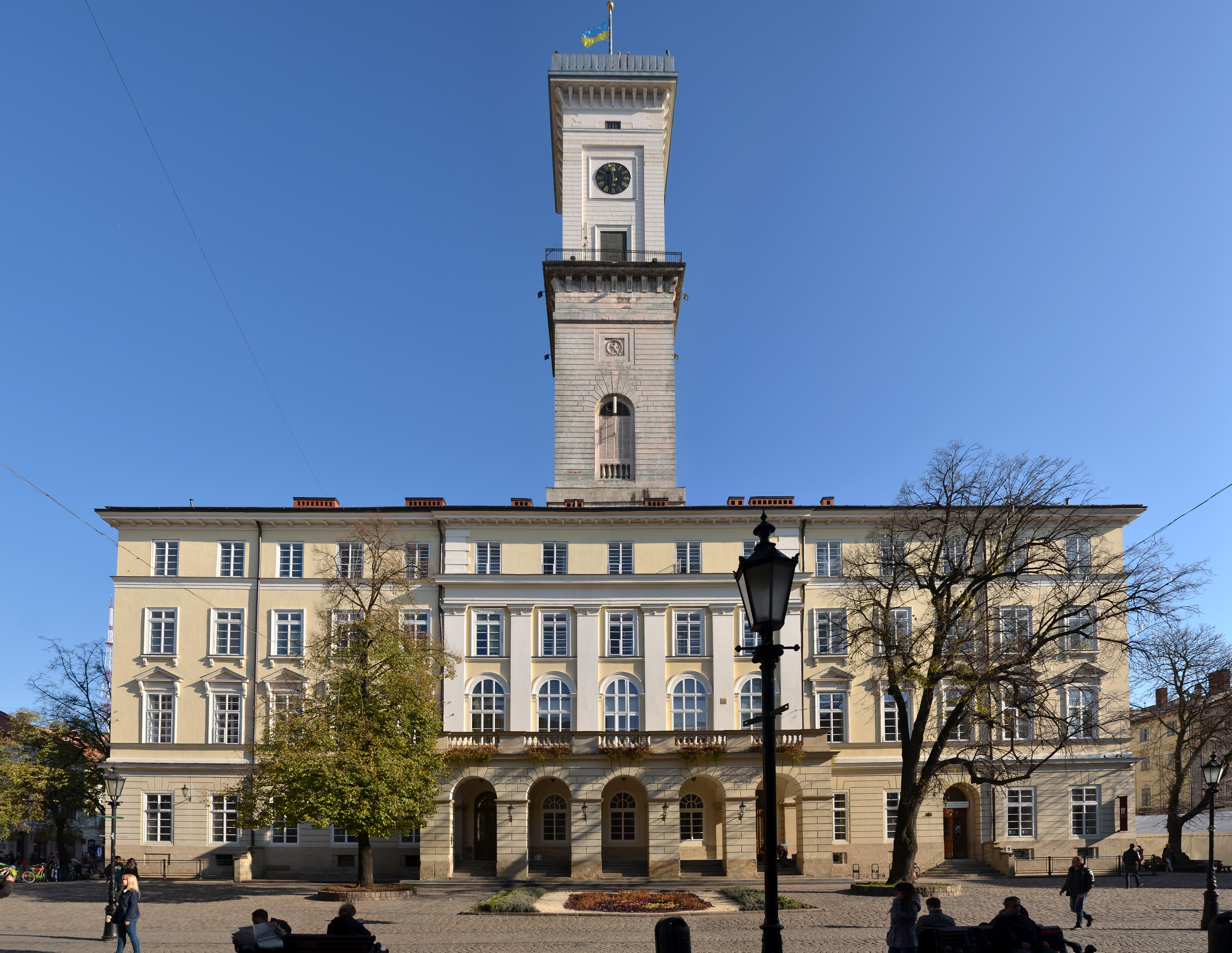
Lviv City Hall (1827-1835)

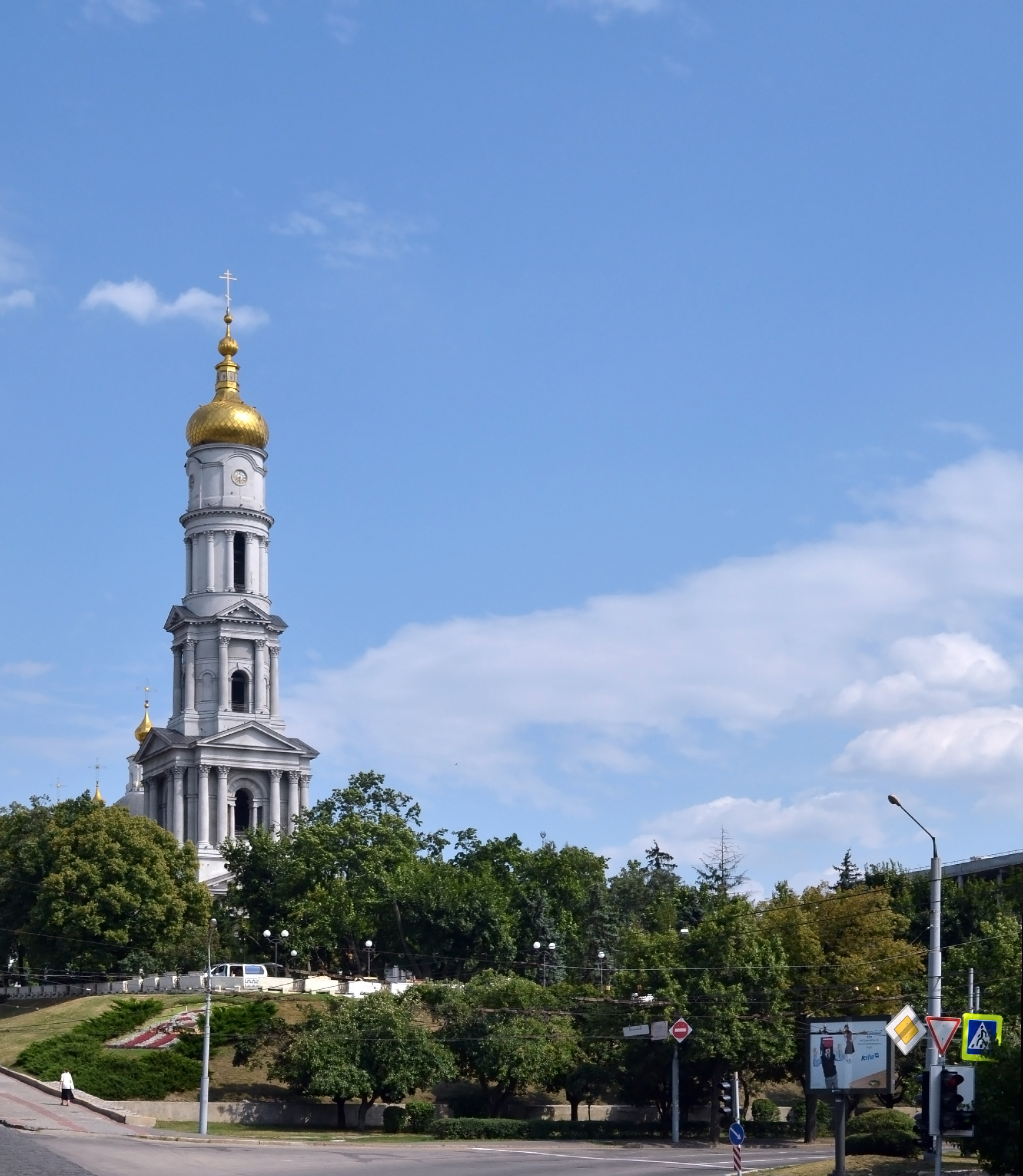
Belfry of the Dormition Cathedral, Kharkiv (1844)

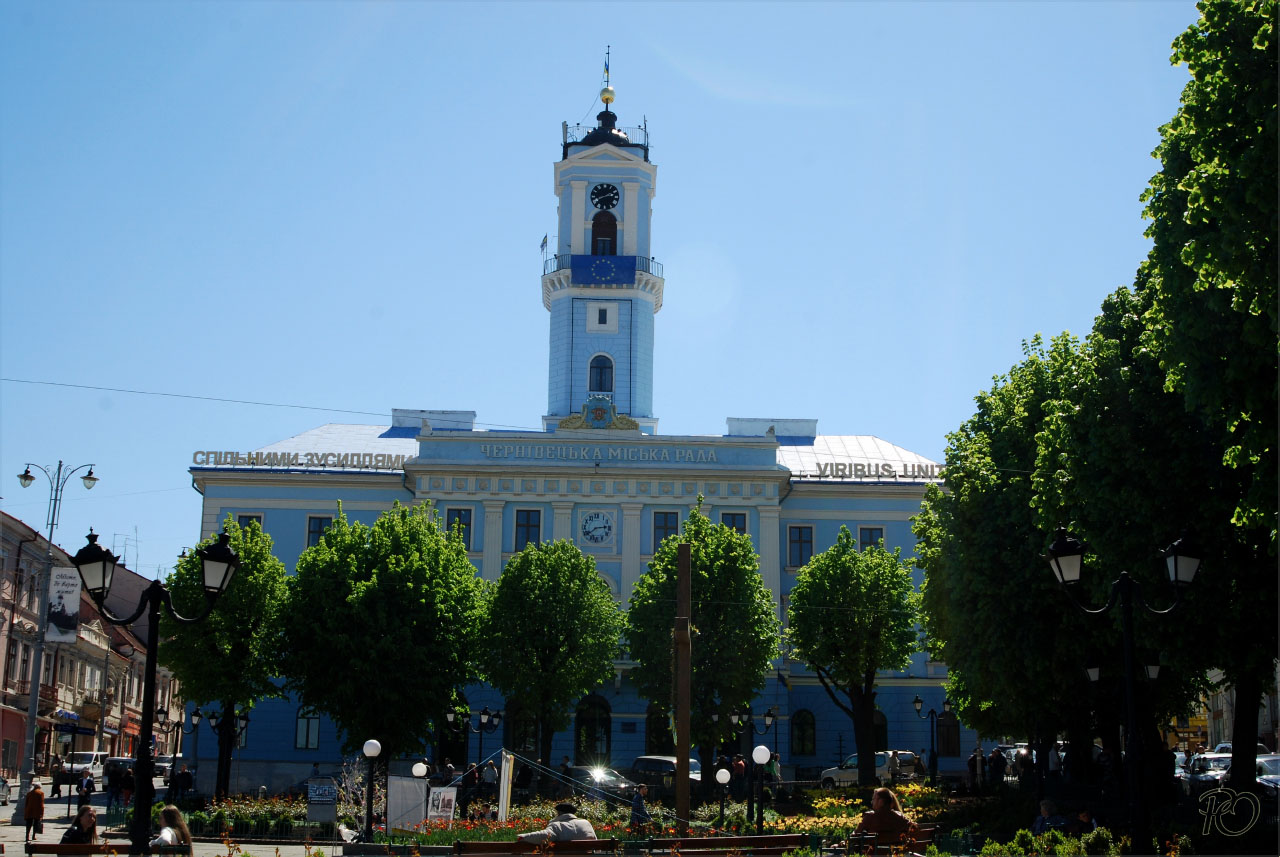
Chernivtsi Town Hall (1843-1847)

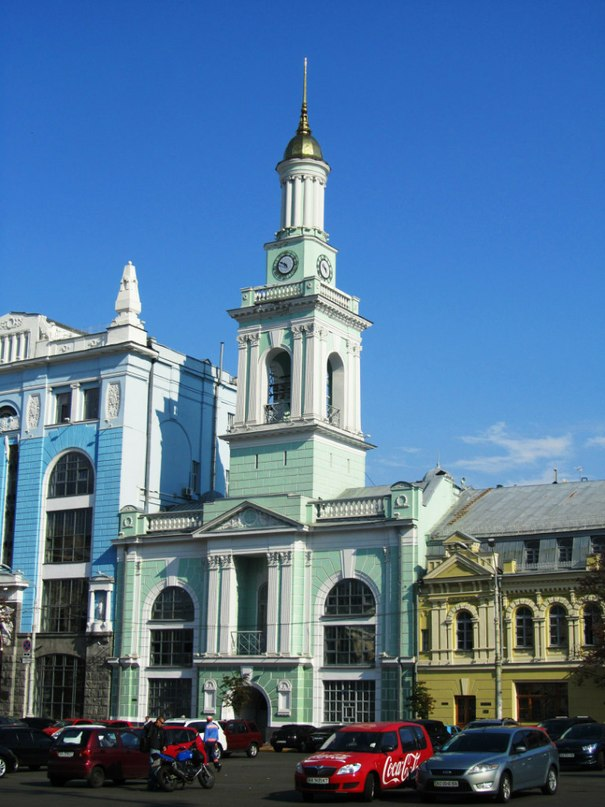
Belfry of St. Catherine's Church, Kyiv (1857)

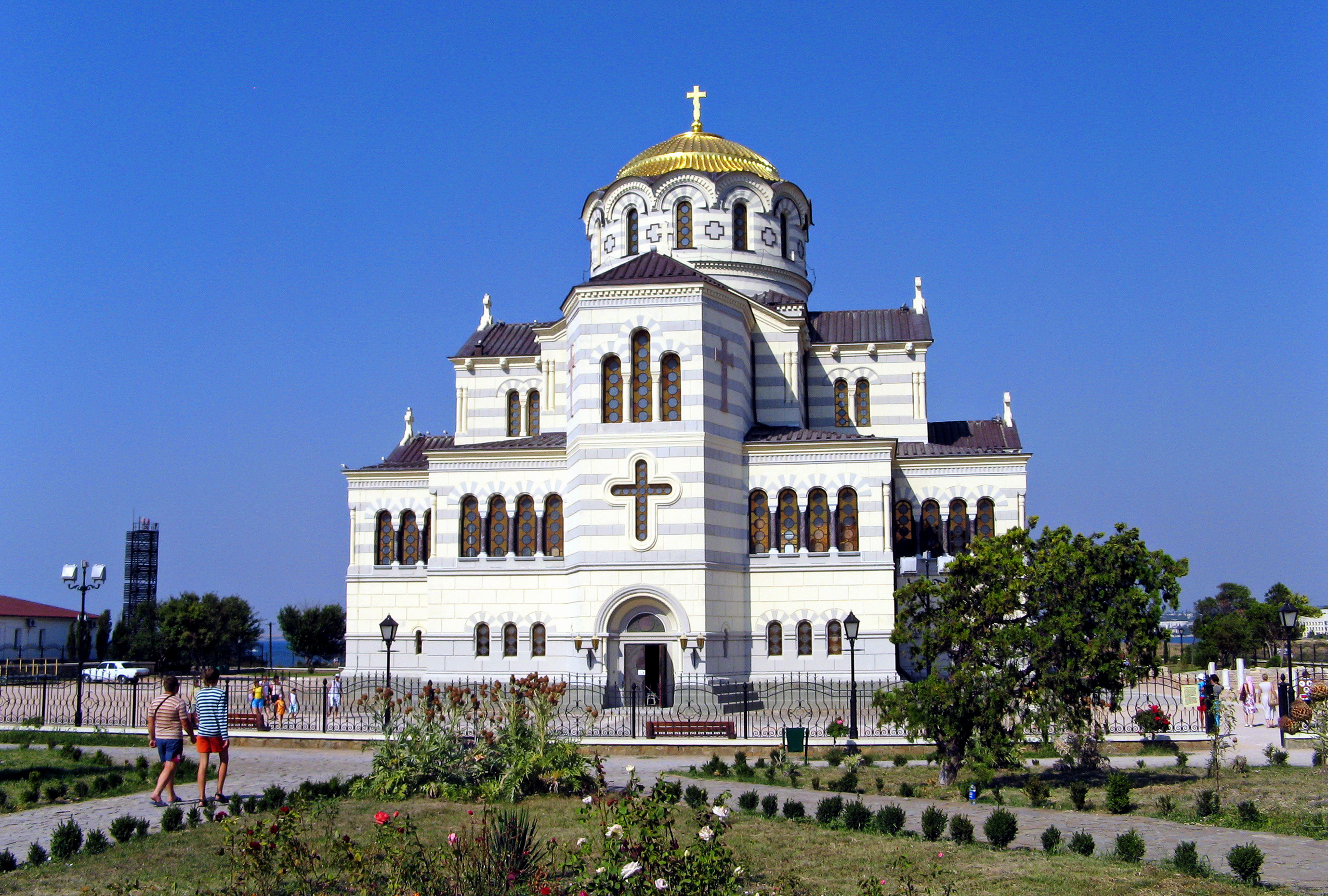
Sain Volodymyr Cathedral, Chersonesus (1861-1891)

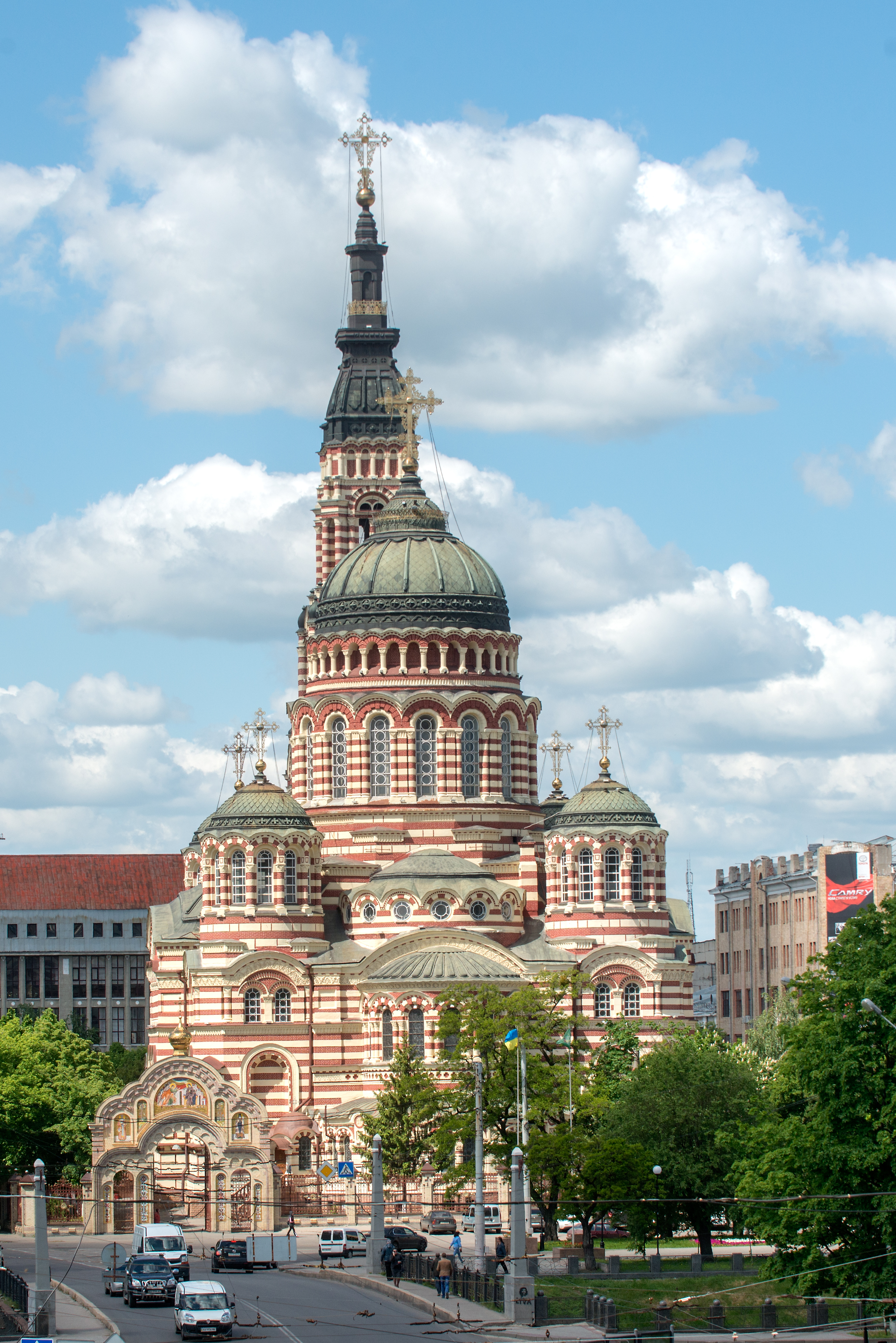
Annunciation Cathedral, Kharkiv (1888–1901)

==== Architecture of late 19th and early 20th centuries ====
Art Nouveau architecture in Ukrainian lands was influenced by two major schools: Vienna Secession and French Moderne. Major examples of this style are the railway stations in Zhmerynka and Lviv, civic and residential buildings in Kyiv, Kharkiv and Odesa. Starting from 1900, a new national architectural style started emerging thanks to the works of Ukrainian architects, most prominently Vasyl Krychevsky. Major works in this style, which was inspired by folk architecture and Ukrainian Baroque, are the Intercession Church in Plishyvets near Poltava (1902), Poltava Governorate Zemstvo Building (1901–1908), Khrennikov House in Dnipro, house of Mykhailo Hrushevsky in Kyiv, Kharkiv Art School, and numerous school buildings designed by Opanas Slastion.

Western parts of Ukraine that were once part of the Austro-Hungarian empire host some prominent examples of 19th-century Central European architecture, such as the Lviv Theatre of Opera and Ballet.

Other architectural monuments of that period include:

- Ginzburg House in Kyiv
- House with Chimaeras in Kyiv (Art Nouveau)
- National Opera of Ukraine in Kyiv
- Historic Centre of Odesa – UNESCO World Heritage Site
- Historic Centre of Kropyvnytskyi
- Building of the Chernivtsi University – UNESCO World Heritage Site
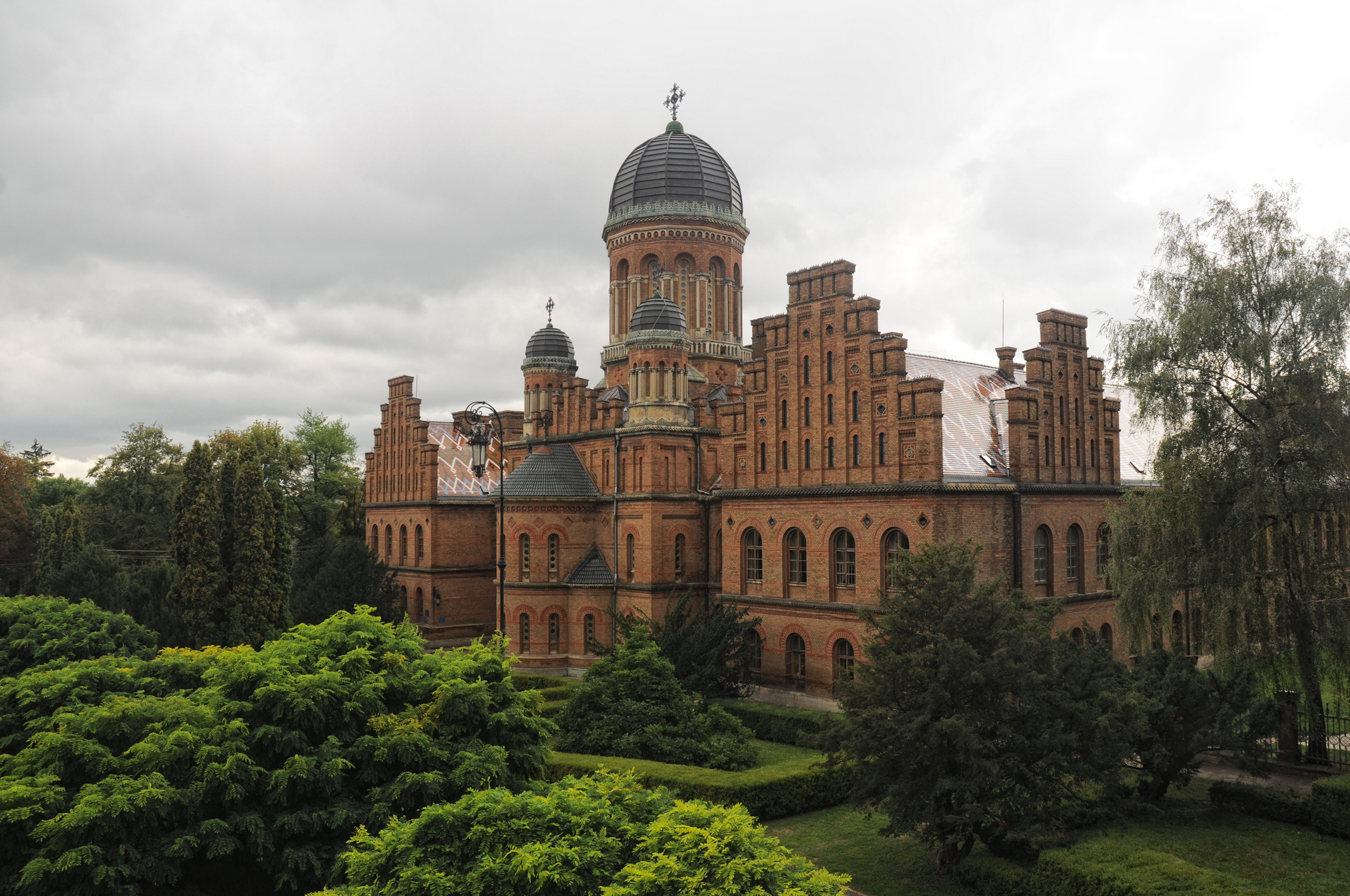
Residence of Bukovinian and Dalmatian Metropolitans (1864–1882)

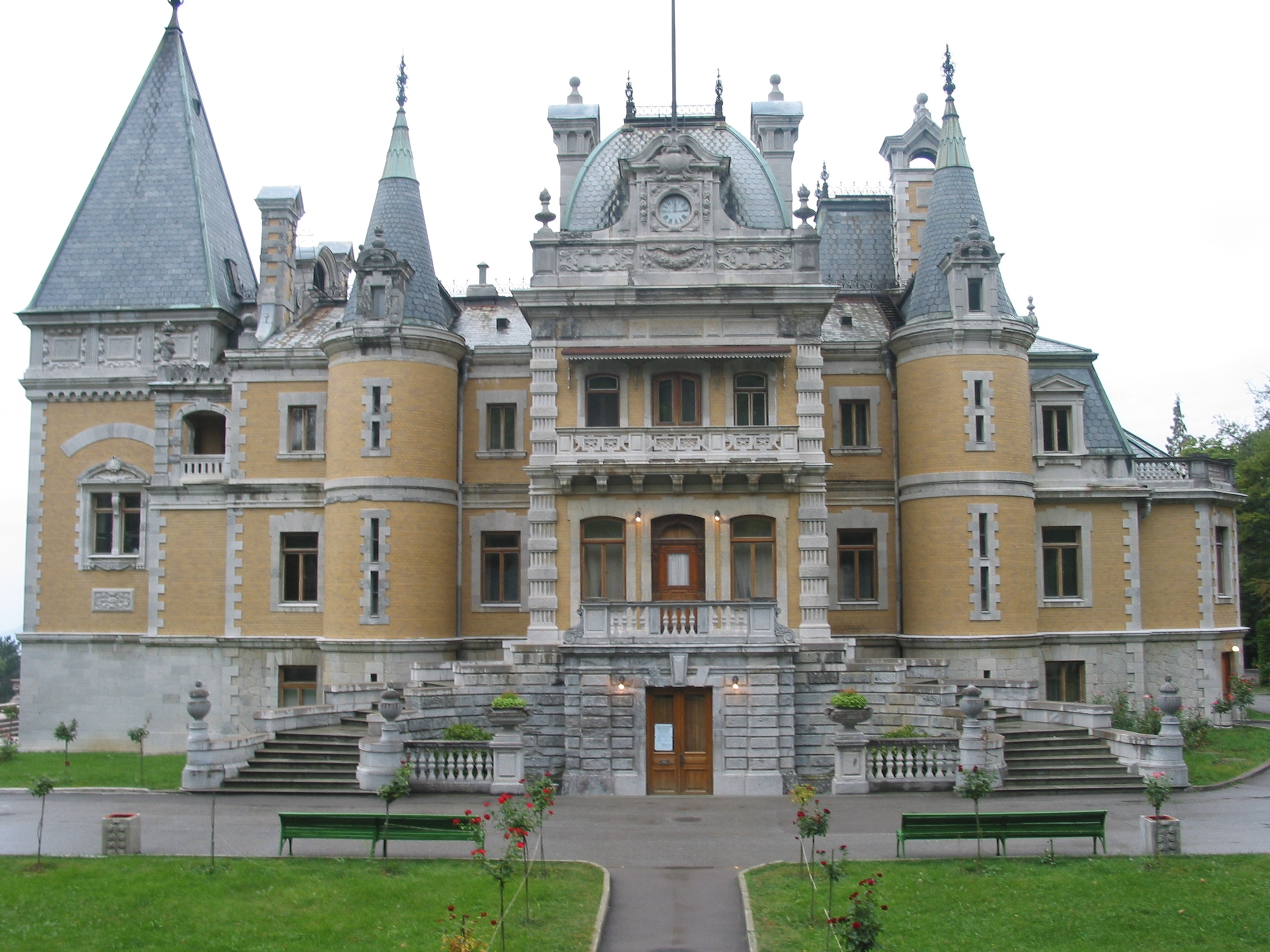
Masandra Palace, Crimea (1881–1882; 1892–1902)

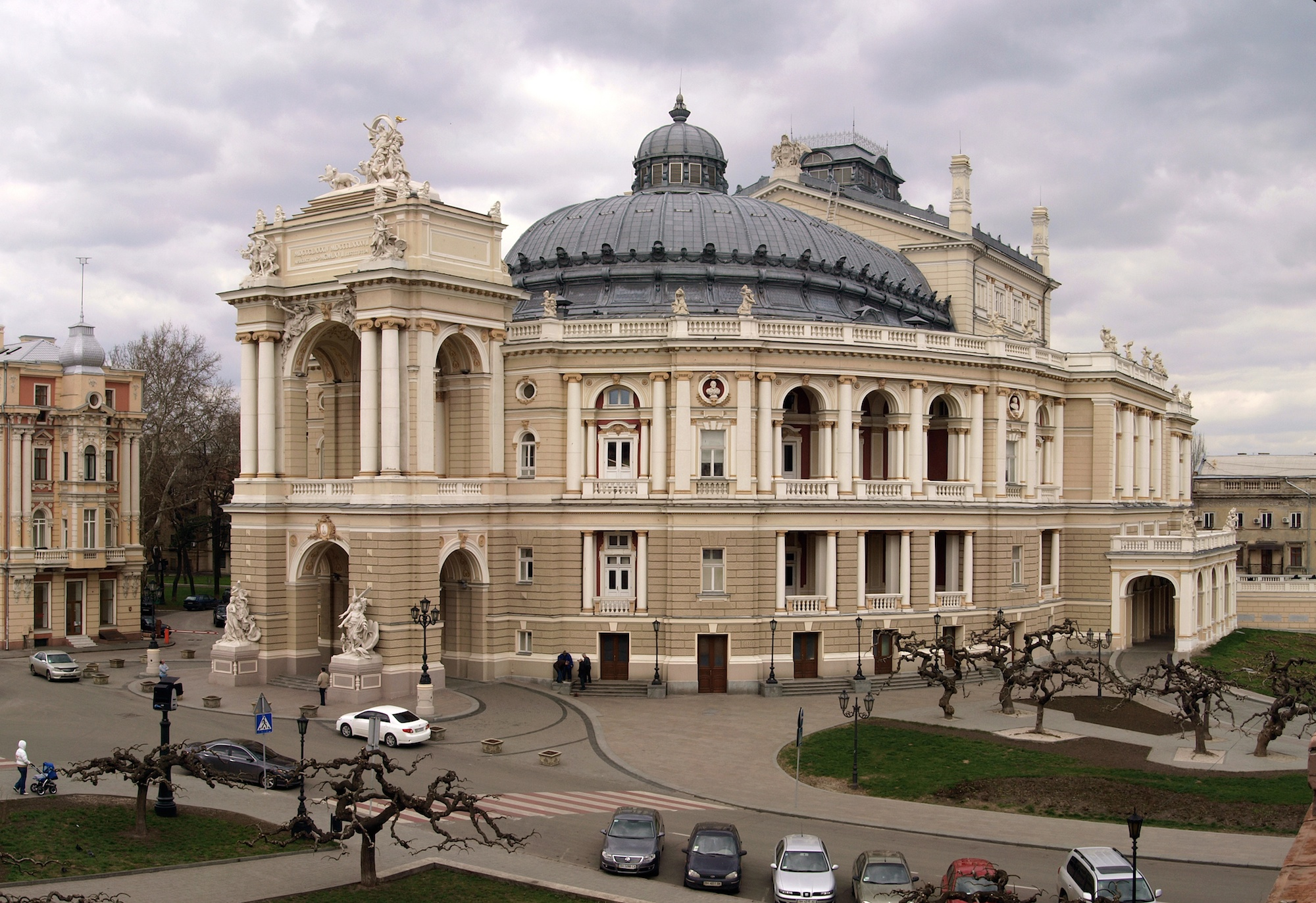
Odesa Opera and Ballet Theatre (1887)

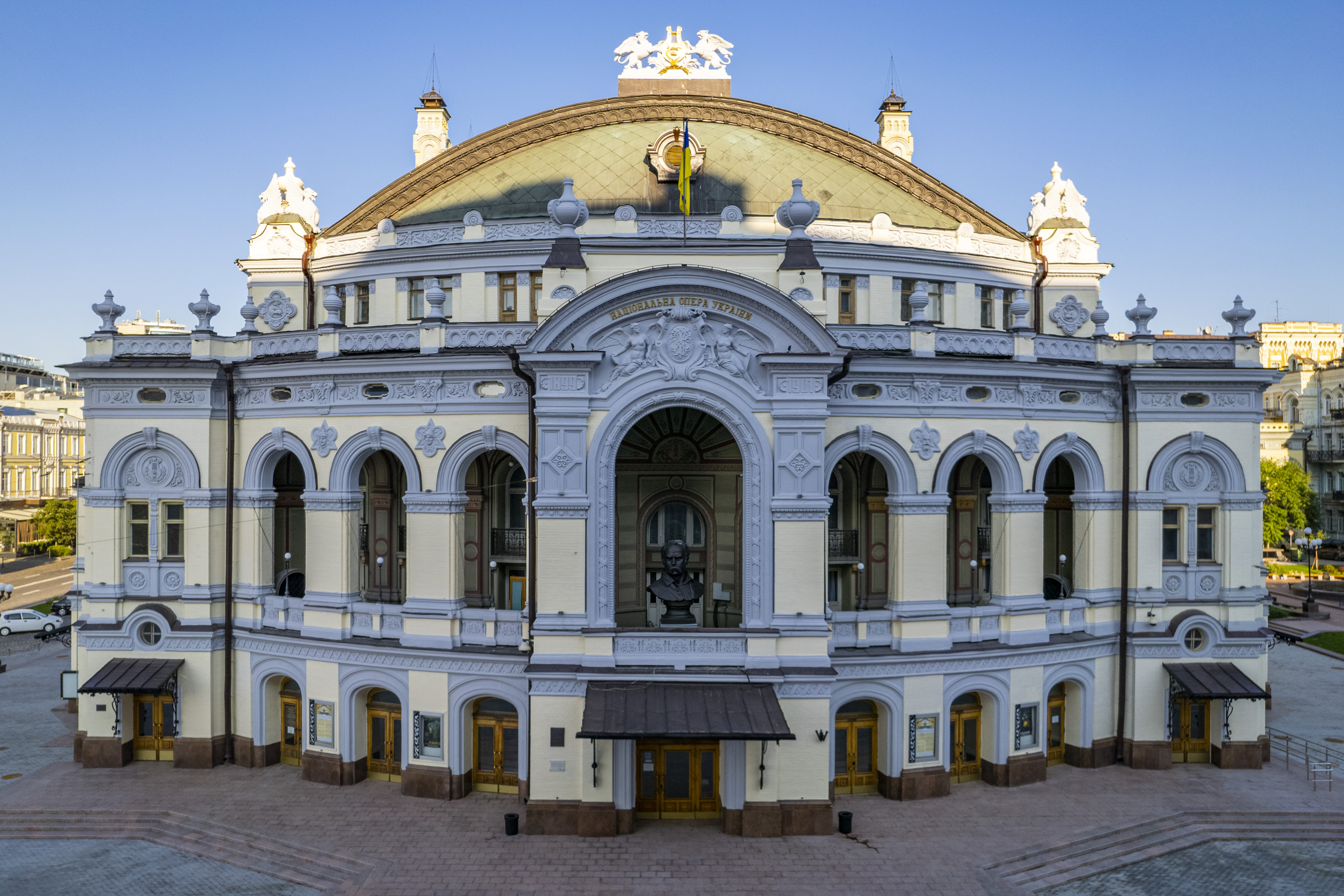
Kyiv Opera (1898-1901)

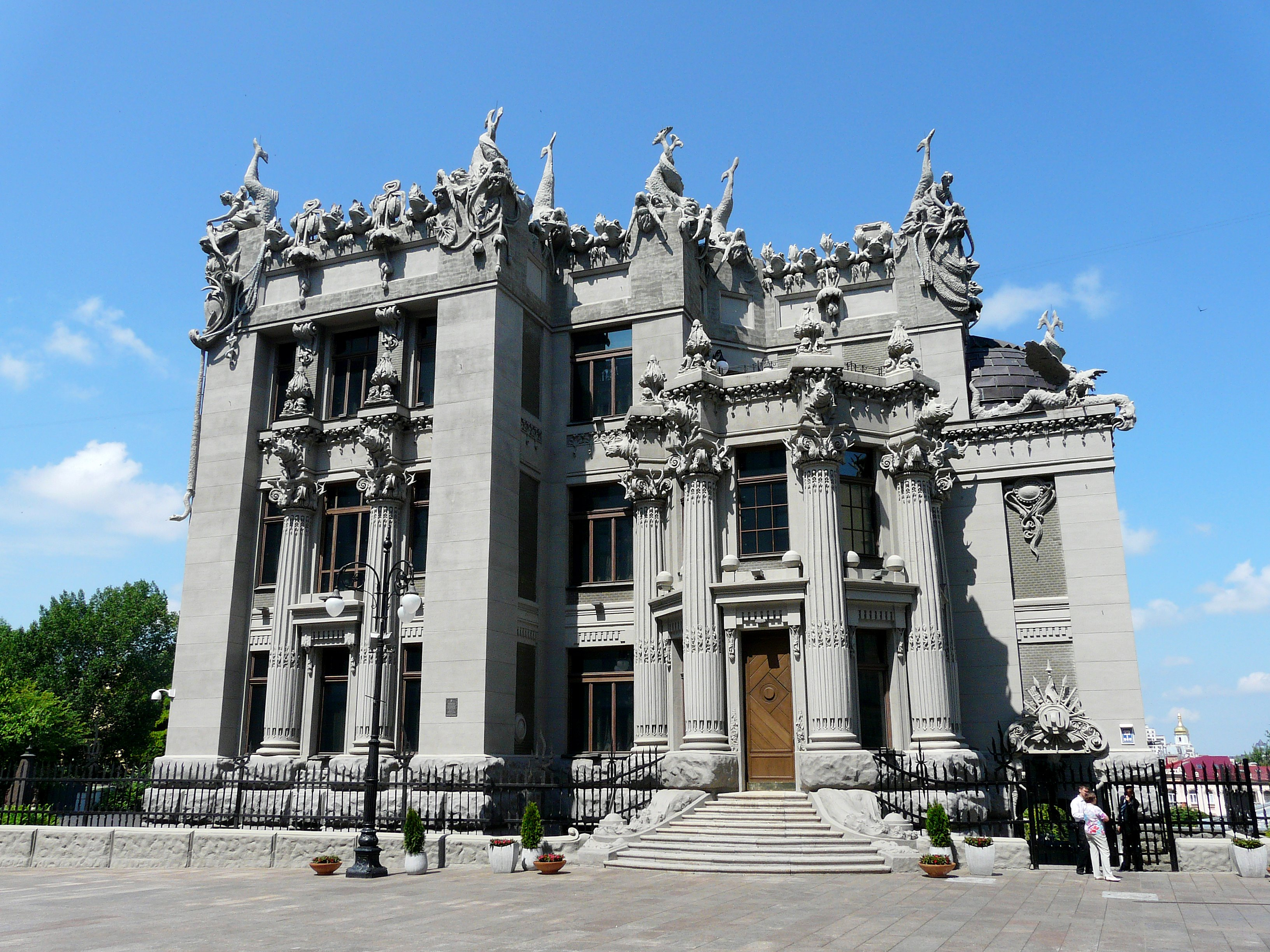
House with Chimaeras, Kyiv (1901–1902)

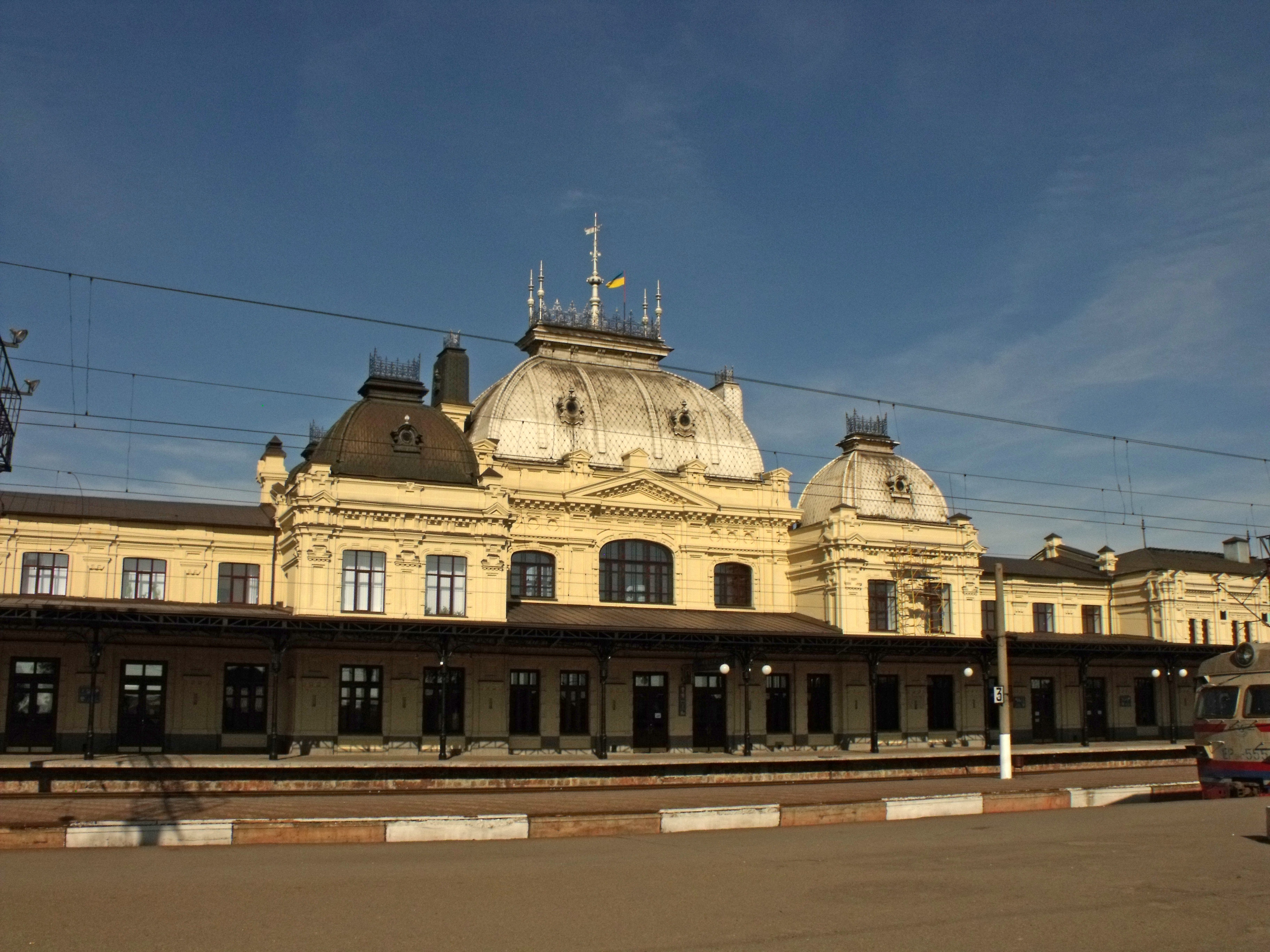
Zhmerynka railway station (1899-1904)

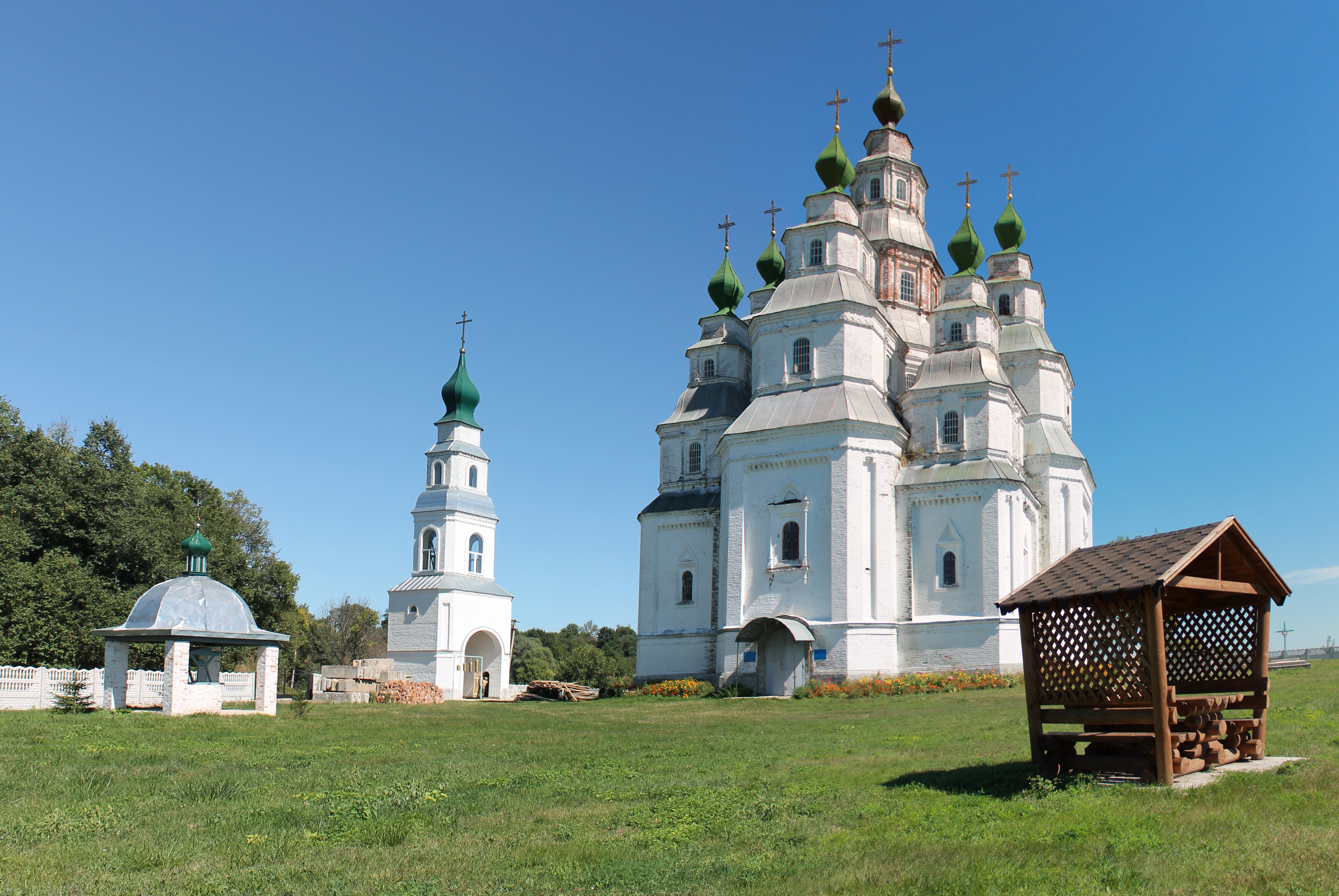
Intercession Church, Plishyvets (1902-1906)

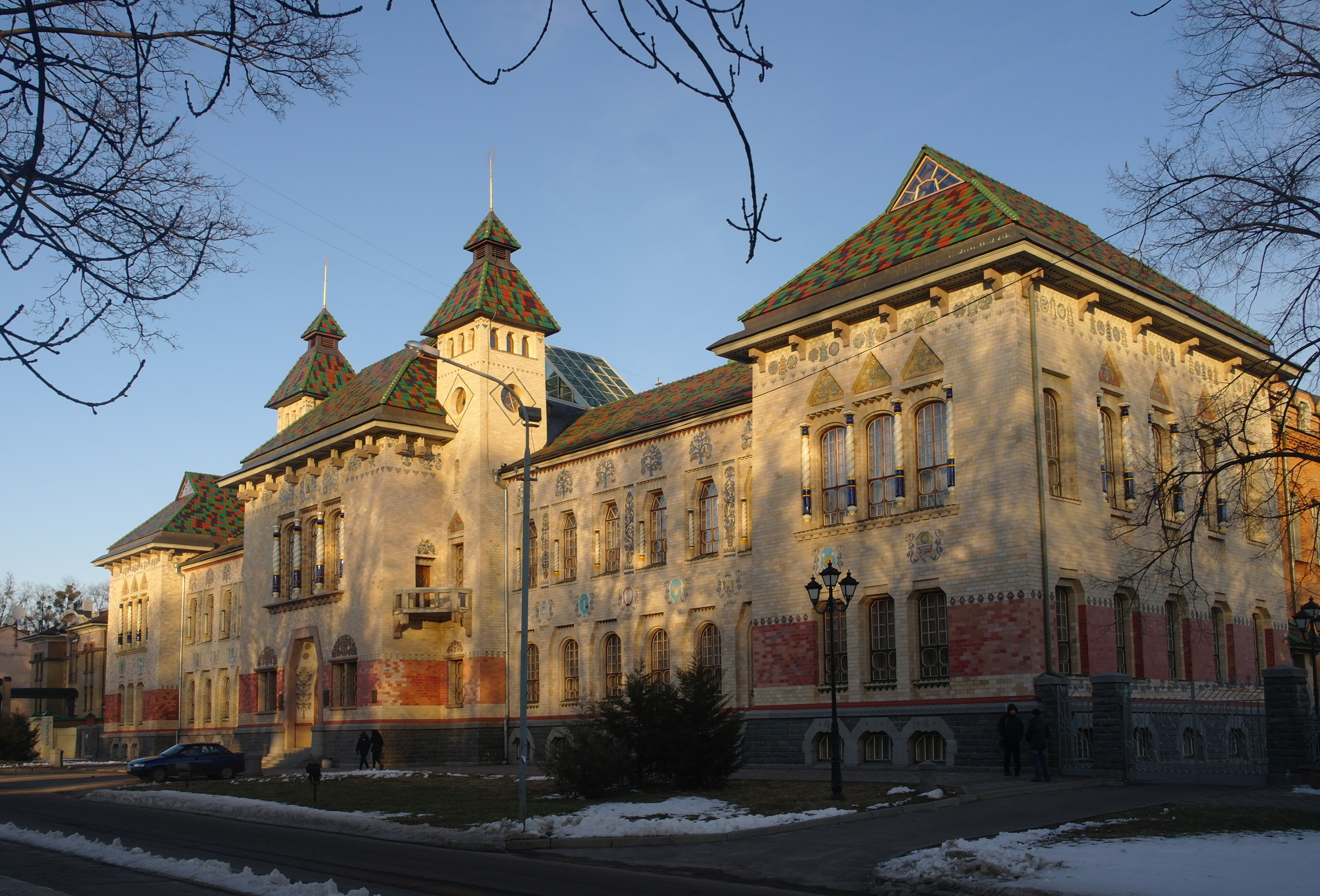
Poltava Governorate Zemstvo Building (1903-1908)

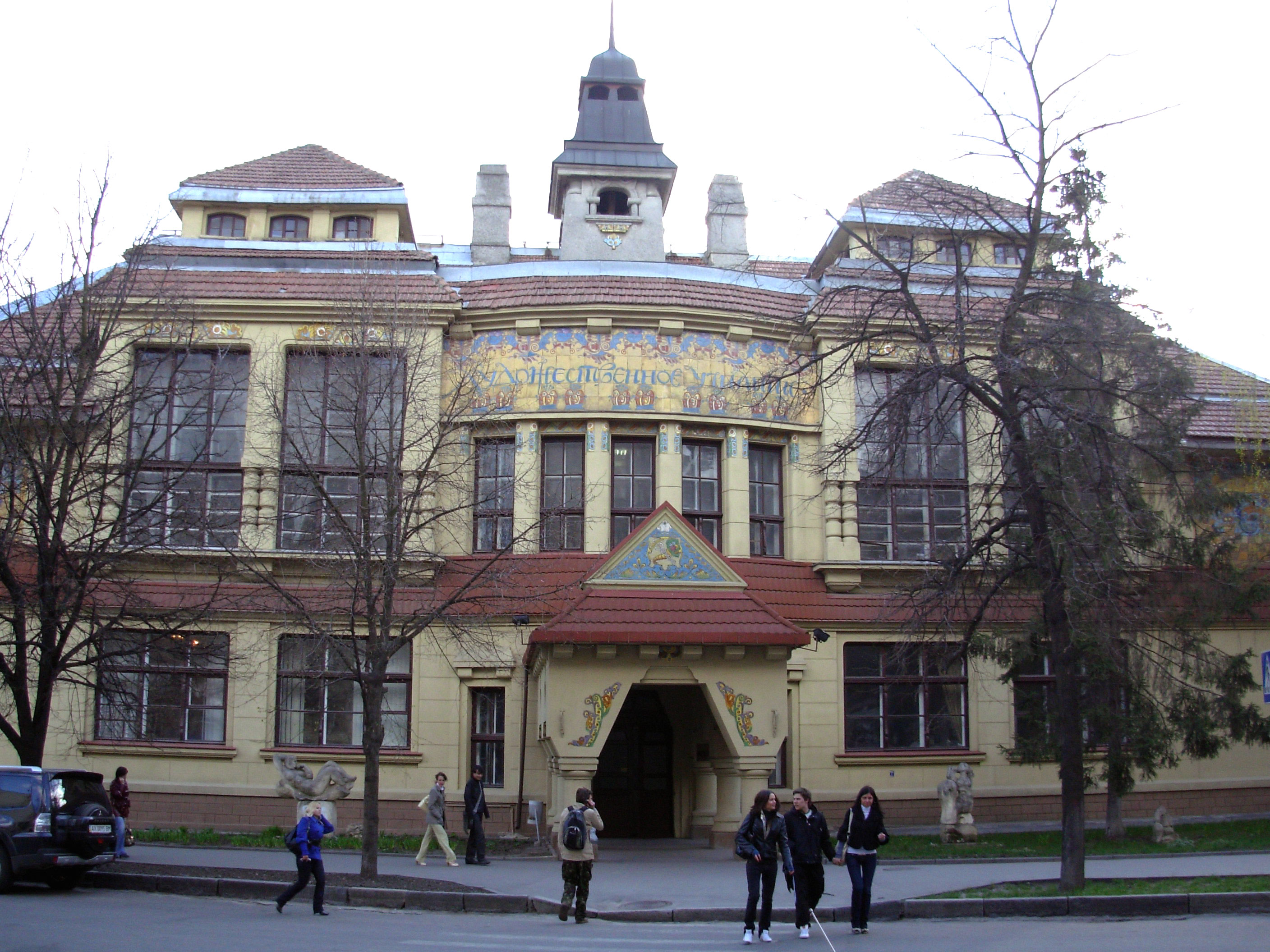
Kharkiv Art School (1912-1913)

=== 20th century ===
==== Early Soviet architecture ====
After the October Revolution and the Russian Civil War that Ukraine was also involved in, most of the Ukrainian territory was incorporated into the new Communist Ukrainian SSR. For the first time, Ukrainians, as a nation became a recognized nationality, and as a result great efforts were undertaken to develop a separate Ukrainian architectural style.

During the early years of the Soviet rule, the Ukrainization policies, meant that many Ukrainian architects were encouraged to use national motives unique to Ukraine. At the same time, architecture became standardised, all cities received general development plans to which they would be built. The national motives were, however, not taken up as the new architectural fashion for the new government became Constructivism.

In Soviet Ukraine, for the first 15 years, the capital was the eastern city of Kharkiv. Immediately a major project was developed to "destroy" its bourgeois-capitalist face and create a new Socialist one. A talented young architect Viktor Trotsenko, proposed a large central square with large modern buildings to become the central hub of the capital. Thus the Dzerzhinsky Square (now Freedom Square) was born, which would become the most brilliant example of constructivist architecture in the USSR and abroad. Enclosing a total of 11.6 ha, it is currently the third largest square in the world to date.

Of all, the most famous was the massive Derzhprom building (1925–1928), which would become a symbol of not only Kharkiv, but Constructivism in general. Built by architects Sergei Serafimov, S. Kravets and M. Felger, and only in three years it would become the highest structure in Europe, and its unique feature lies in the symmetry which can only be felt at one point, in the centre of the square. As a tribute to the engineering design by Kharkiv's Technical University, none of the attempts to blow the building during the Second World War were successful, and it still remains the symbol of Kharkiv today.

Other examples on the square, however, were less fortunate. Such was the fate of the House of Projects (presently the main building of Kharkiv National University), which again was designed by Serafimov, built to symmetrise the Derzhprom on the square's curvature, it too was a monumental achievement of constructivism. However, during the war it was seriously damaged and was rebuilt in a semi-Stalinist style that left little of the original building intact.

Other notable examples of architecture from the early Soviet years in Ukraine are the DniproHES and Sotsmisto in Zaporizhzhia.

Interwar architecture in Soviet Ukraine

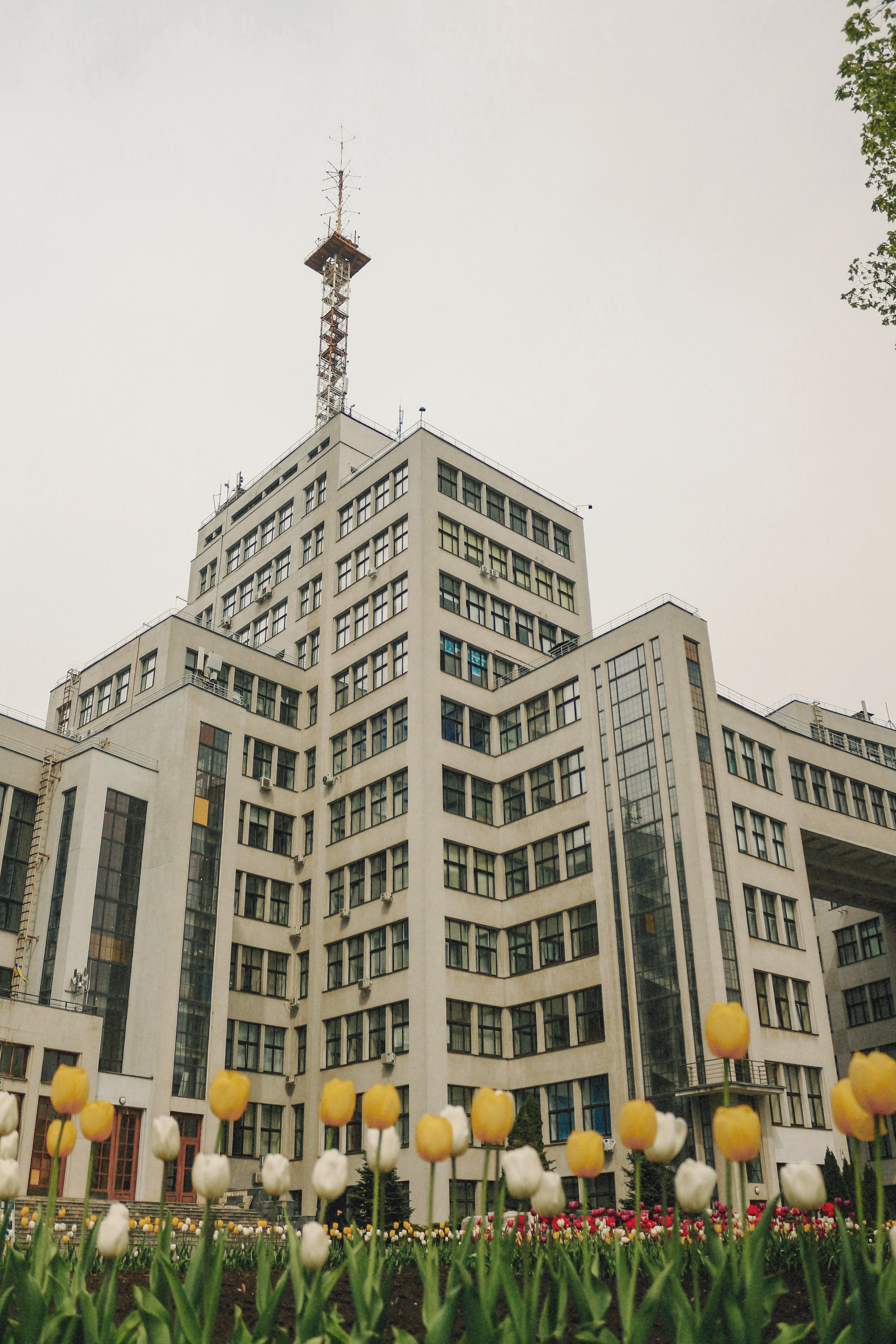
Derzhprom Building in Kharkiv (1925–1928)

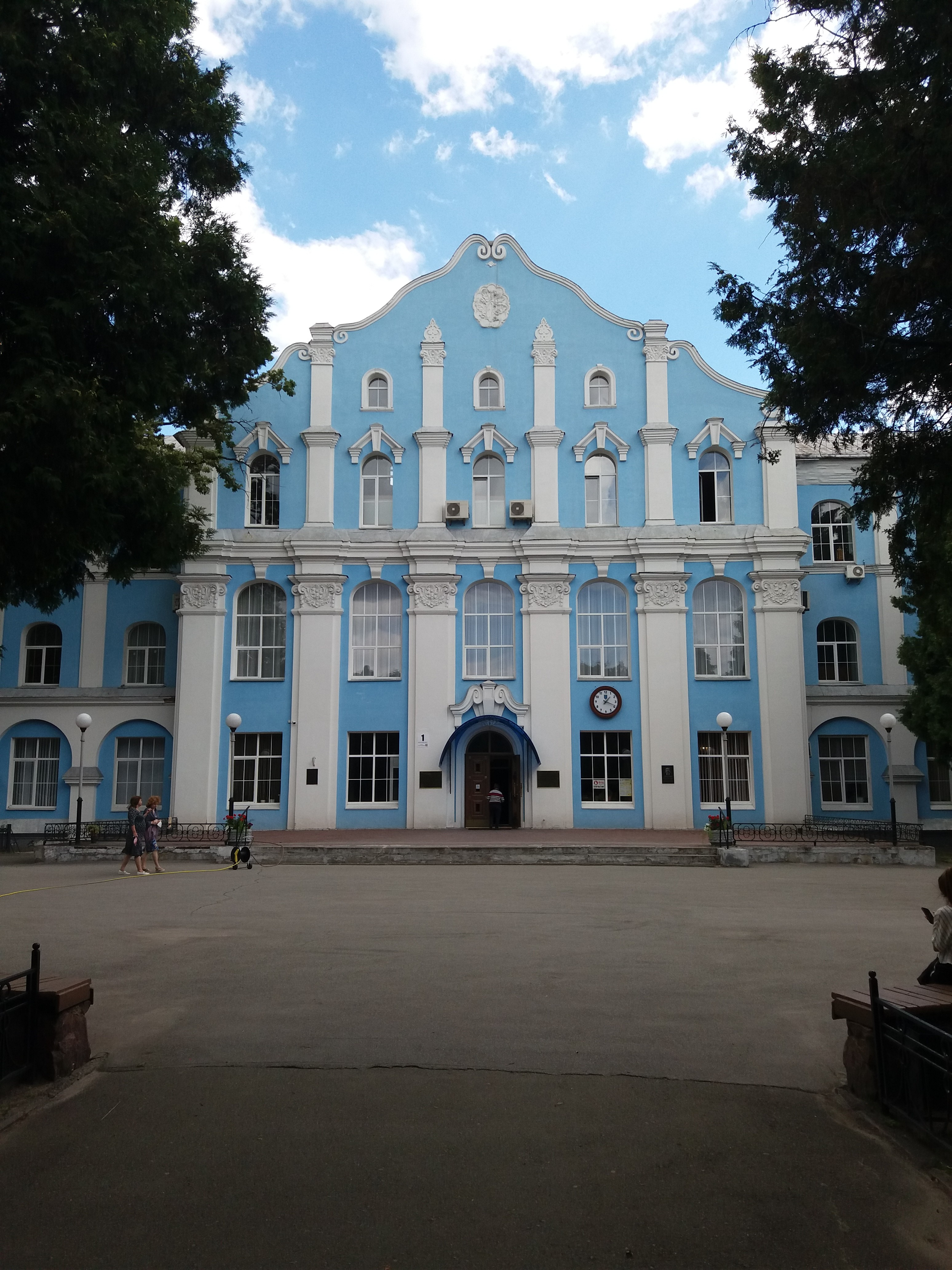
Kyiv Forestry Engineering Institute (1925-1927)

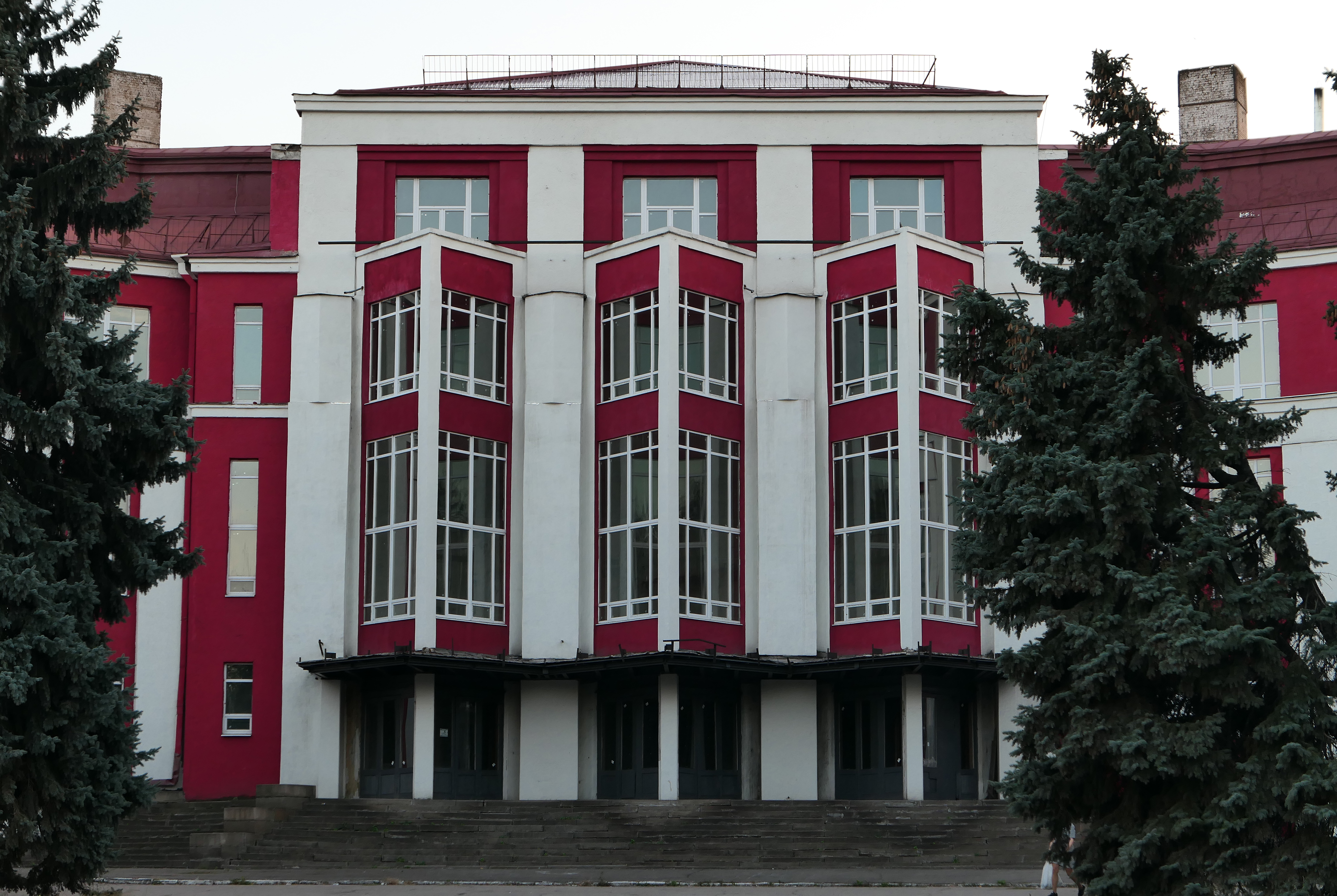
Palace of Labour, Dnipro (1926-1932)

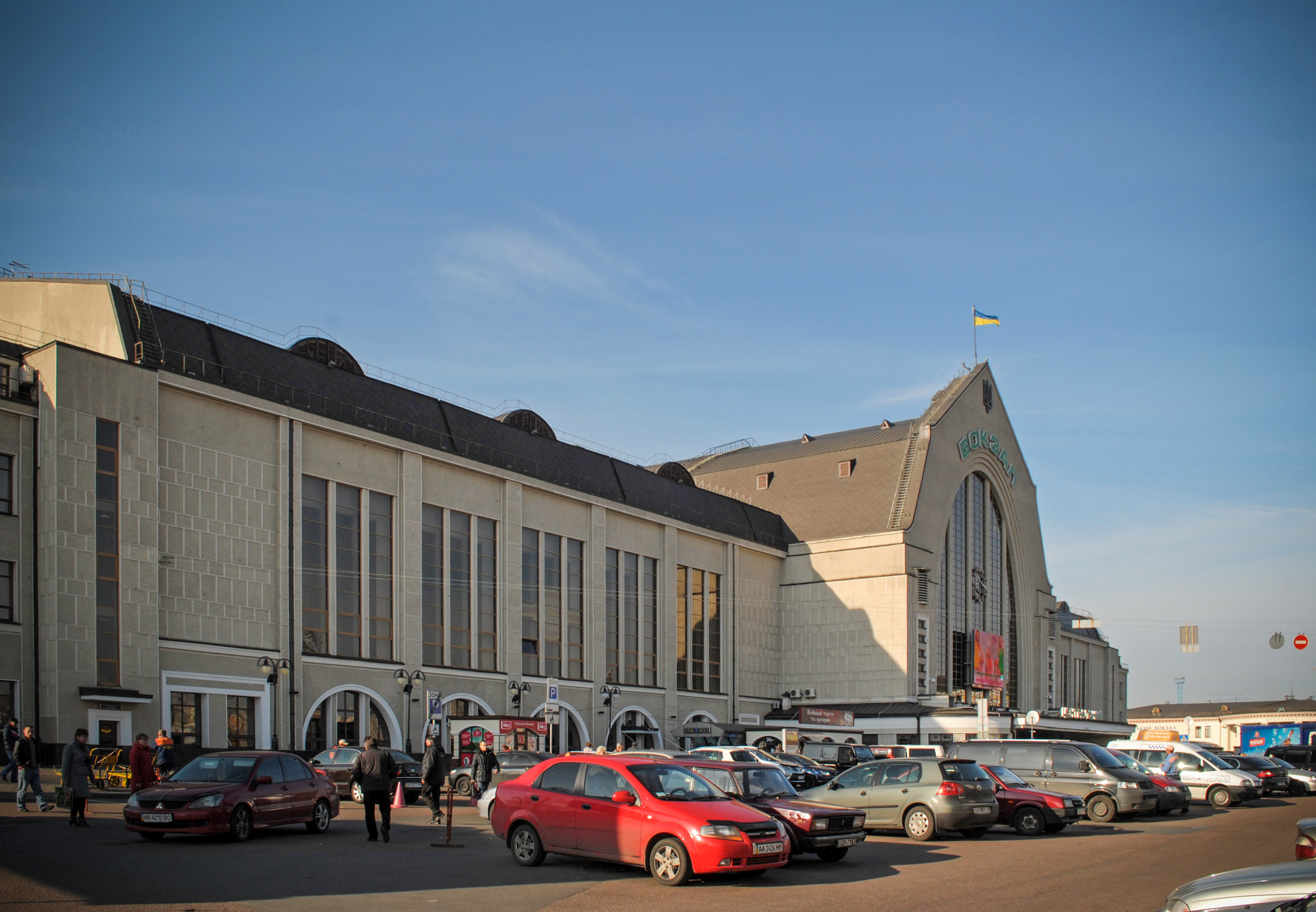
Kyiv-Pasazhyrskyi railway station (1927-1932)

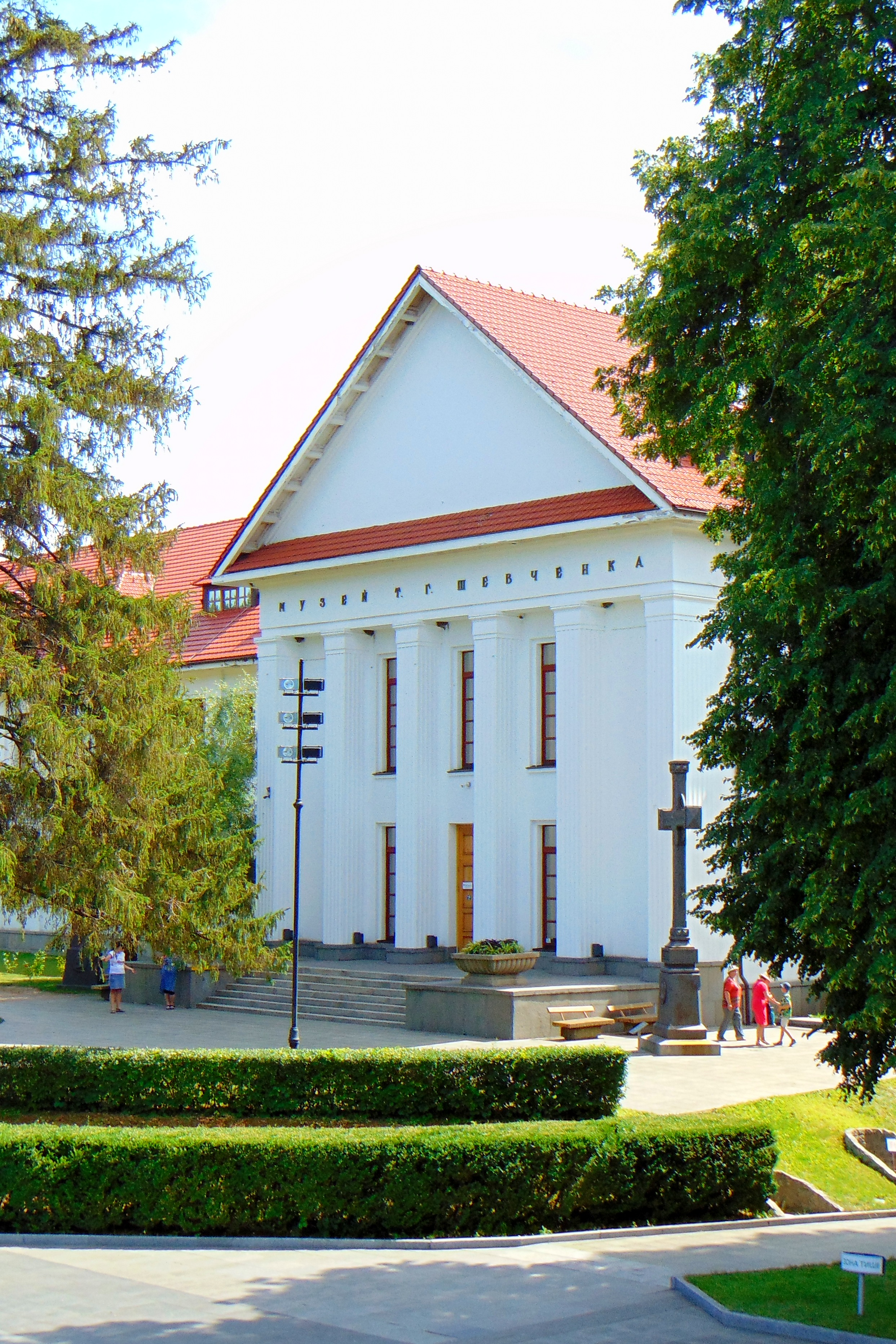
Shevchenko National Museum, Kaniv (1935-1937)

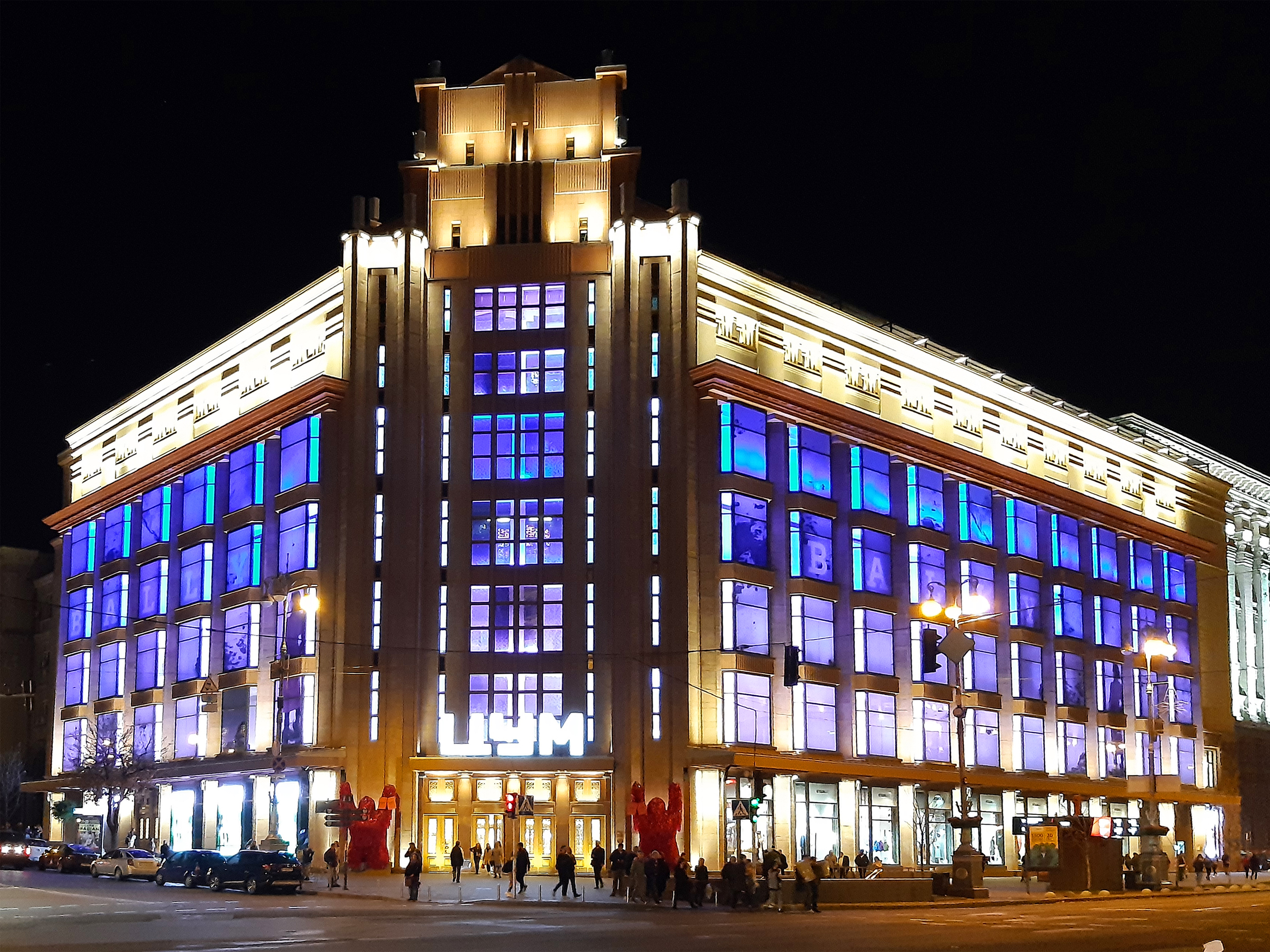
Central Department Store, Kyiv (1936-1939)

==== Interwar architecture in Western Ukraine ====
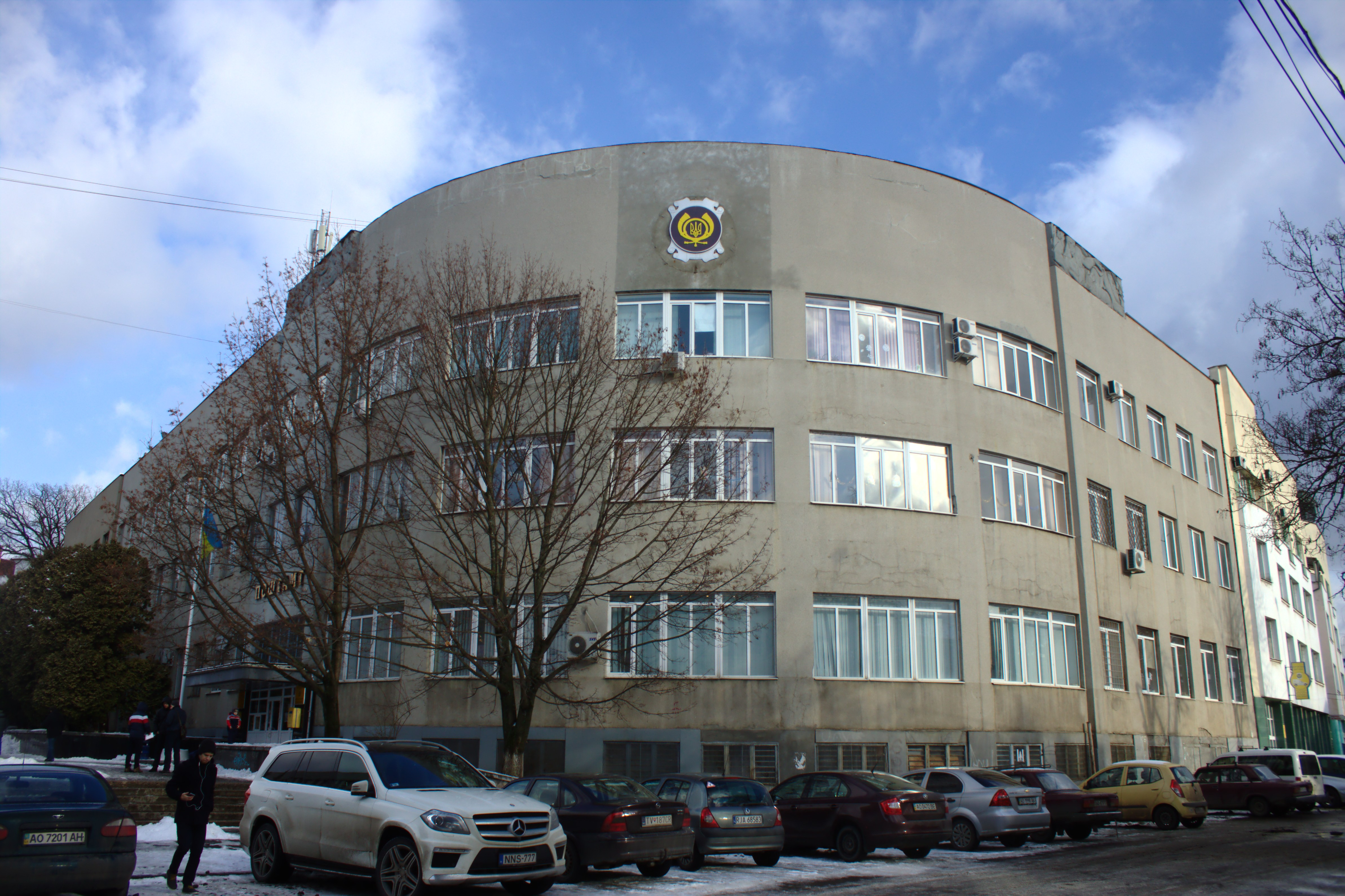
Main Post Office building in Uzhhorod (1928–1932)

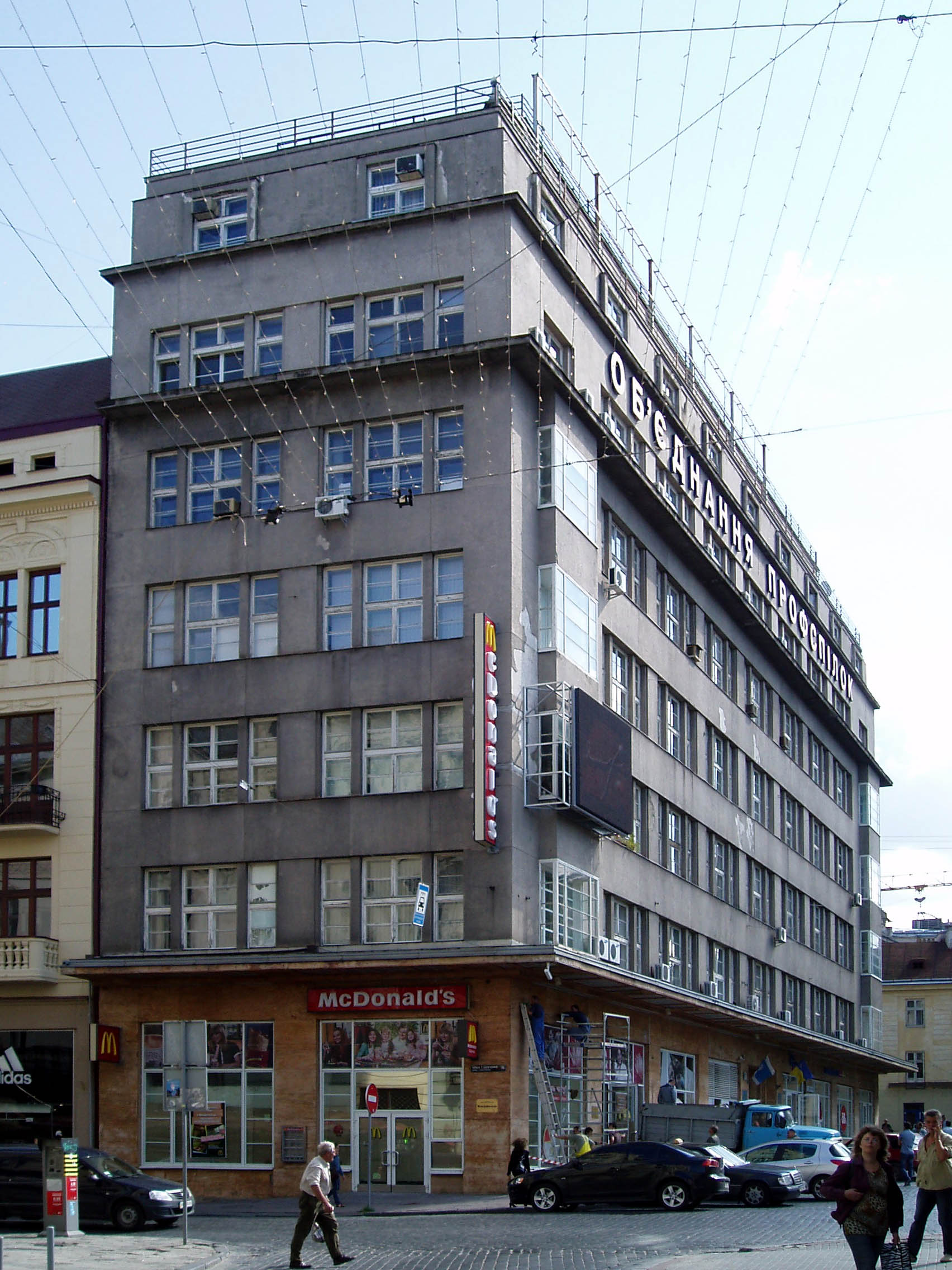
Trade Unions House in Lviv, an example of Polish functionalism

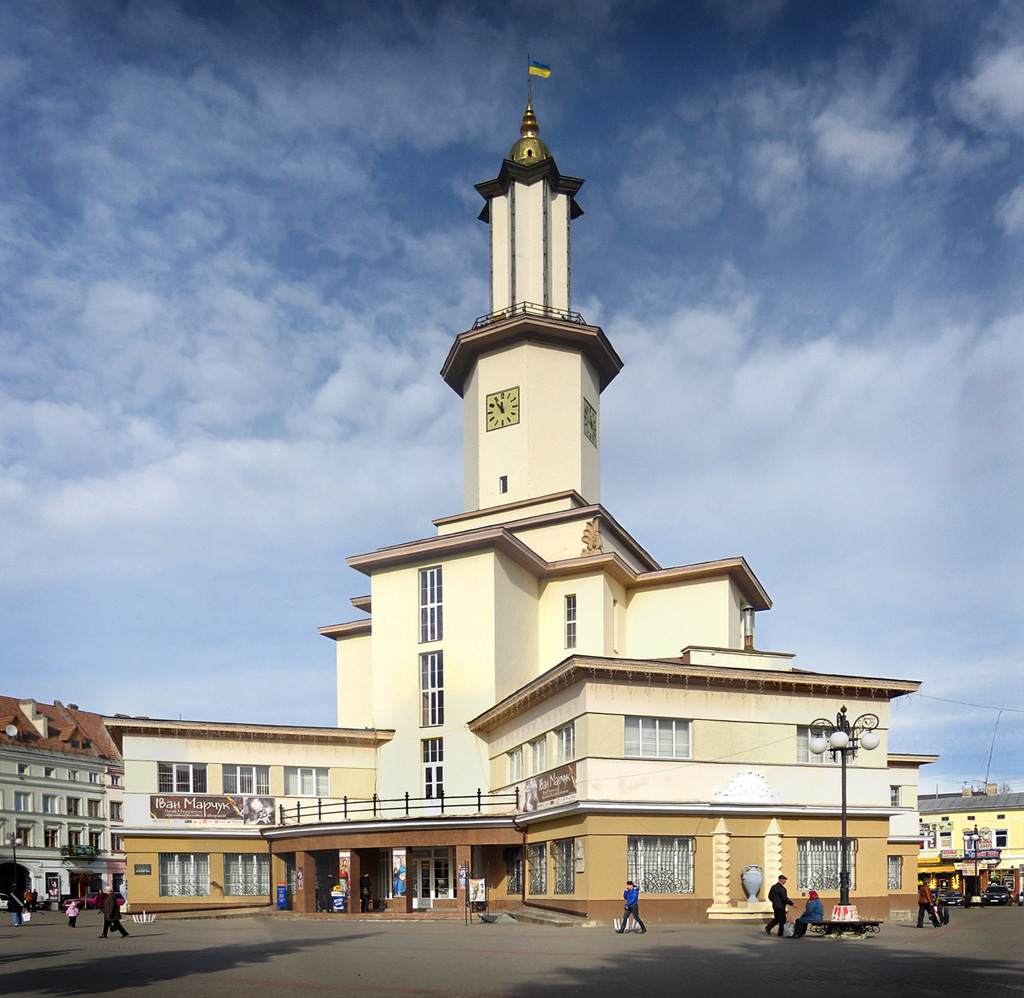
Ivano-Frankivsk (Stanisławów) City Hall (1928-1935)

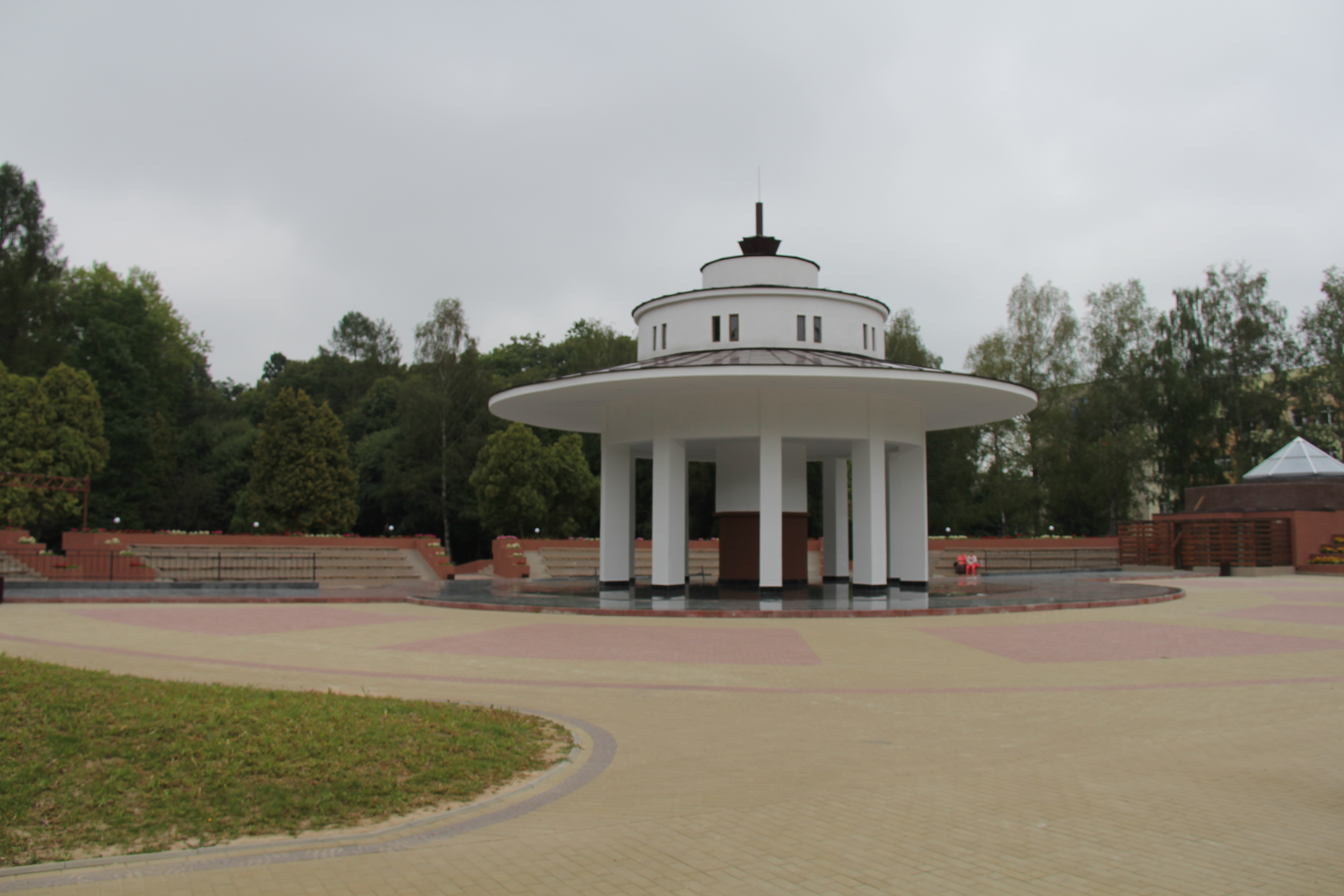
Drinking fountain in Morshyn (1930s)

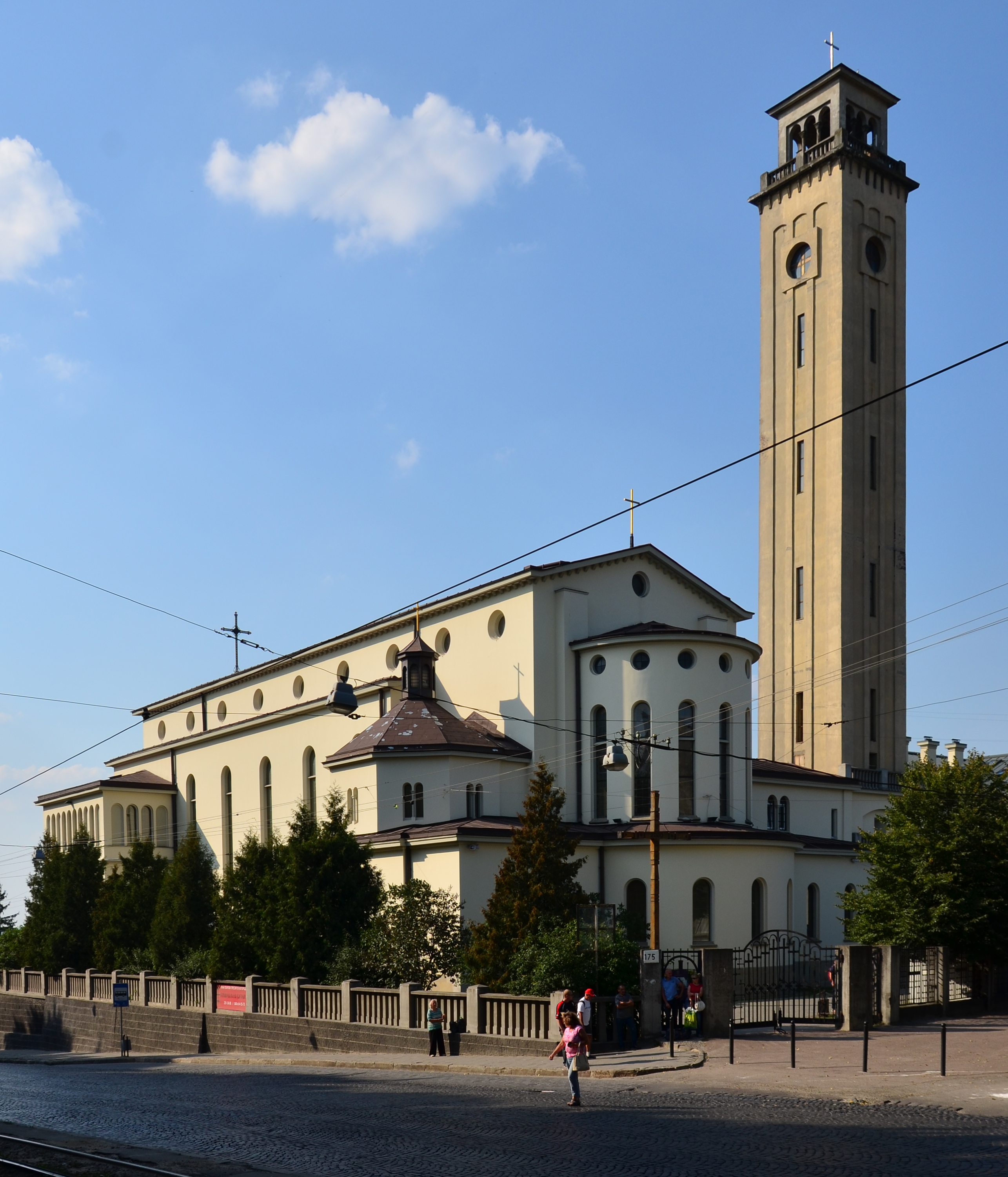
Intercession Church, Lychakiv in Lviv (built as Church of the Mother of God of Ostra Brama in 1931–1938)

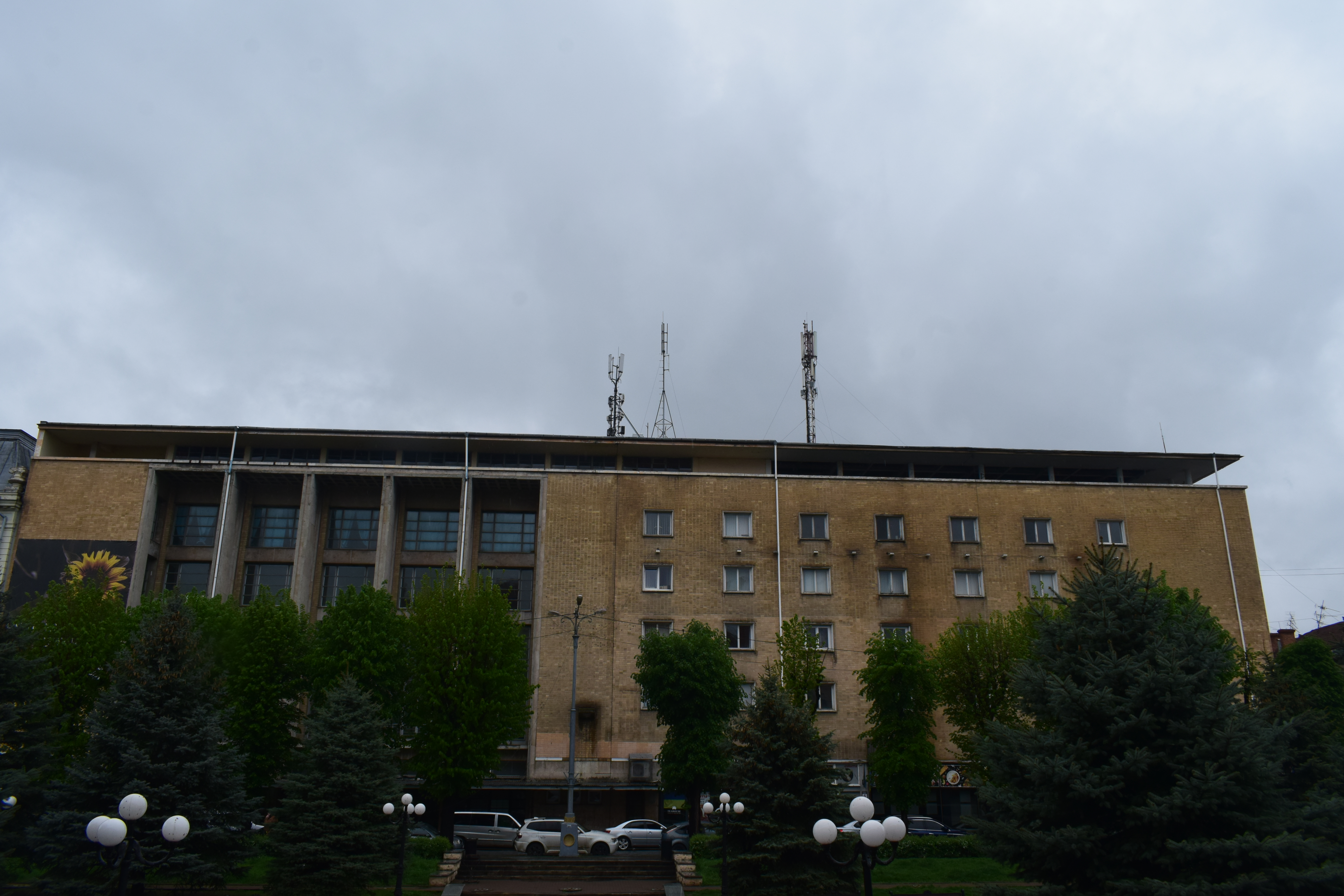
Romanian National Palace (now House of Officers) in Chernivtsi (1937–1940)

==== Stalinist architecture ====
In 1934, the capital of Soviet Ukraine moved to Kyiv. During the preceding years, the city was seen as only a regional centre, and hence received little attention. All of that was to change, but at a great price. By this point, the first examples of Stalinist architecture were already showing and in light of the official policy, a new city was to be built on top of the old one. This meant that priceless examples such as the St. Michael's Golden-Domed Monastery were destroyed. Even the St. Sophia Cathedral was under threat.

However, the Second World War did not see the project realised. The surviving pre-war Kyivan constructions include the Building of the Central Committee of the Communist Party of Ukraine (presently occupied by the Ministry of Foreign Affairs). Built by architect, only the northern wing was completed, the identical and symmetrical southern wing to be built on the place of the destroyed monastery to house the Rada of Ministers was never completed. The other example is the Verkhovna Rada building built in 1936–38 by architect Volodymyr Zabolotny.

Following the heavy destruction of the Second World War, a new project for the reconstruction of central Kyiv was unveiled. This transformed the Khreshchatyk avenue into one of the finest examples of Stalinism in architecture. A total of individual 22 projects were drawn up, when the initial competition began in 1944, none of which was realised due to extensive critique and finally in 1948 the Kyiv Proekt institute submitted its final version, headed by architects A. Vlasov and from 1949 Anatoly Dobrovolsky. For the next two decades, this figure would dominate all of the major projects in the capital.

Despite an enthusiastic start which saw most of the buildings such as the Post Office, City Council, the elegant white portico Conservatory, and the first buildings of the Kalinina Square, which were completed by 1955, the new politics of architecture once again promptly stopped the project from fully being realised. None of the examples, however, share the fate of Hotel Ukraina that was to top the square as an elegant high-rise built similar to the Moscow's Seven Sisters buildings, was stripped of all decorative features and completed in what could only be described as unattractive style.

Central Kyiv Reconstruction Projects
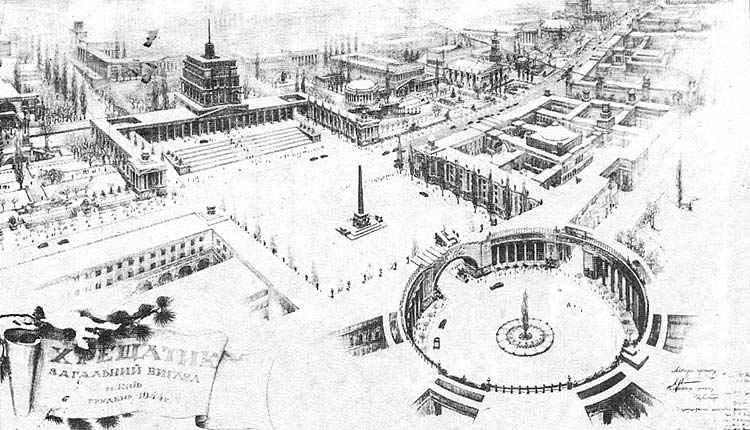
Rejected project

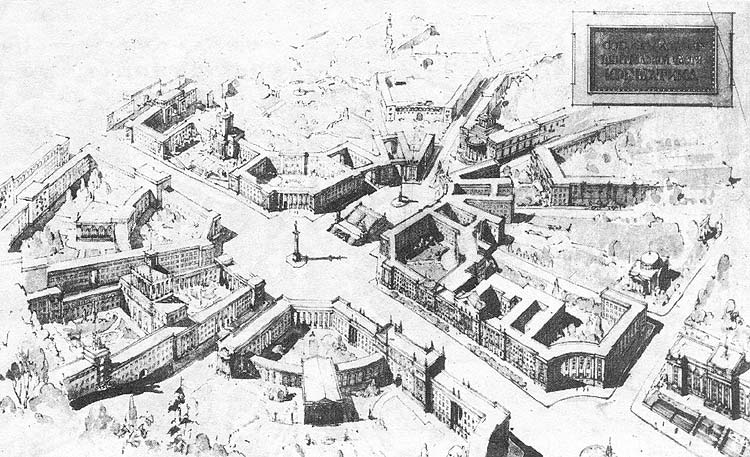
Another rejected project

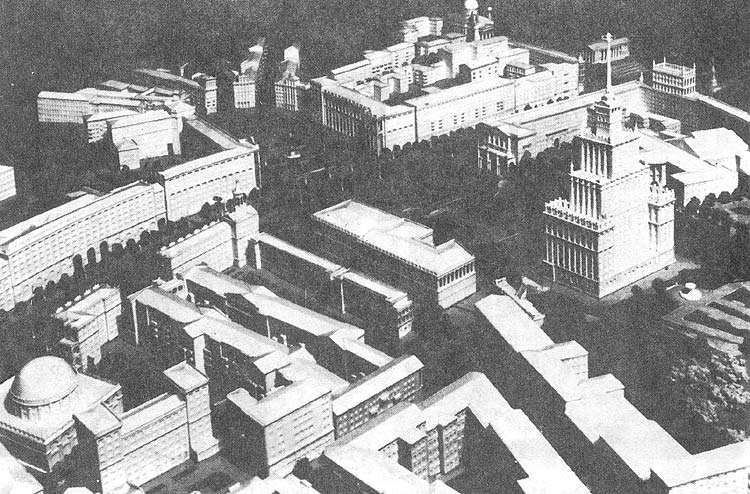
Final project

Examples of Stalinist-era architecture in Ukraine

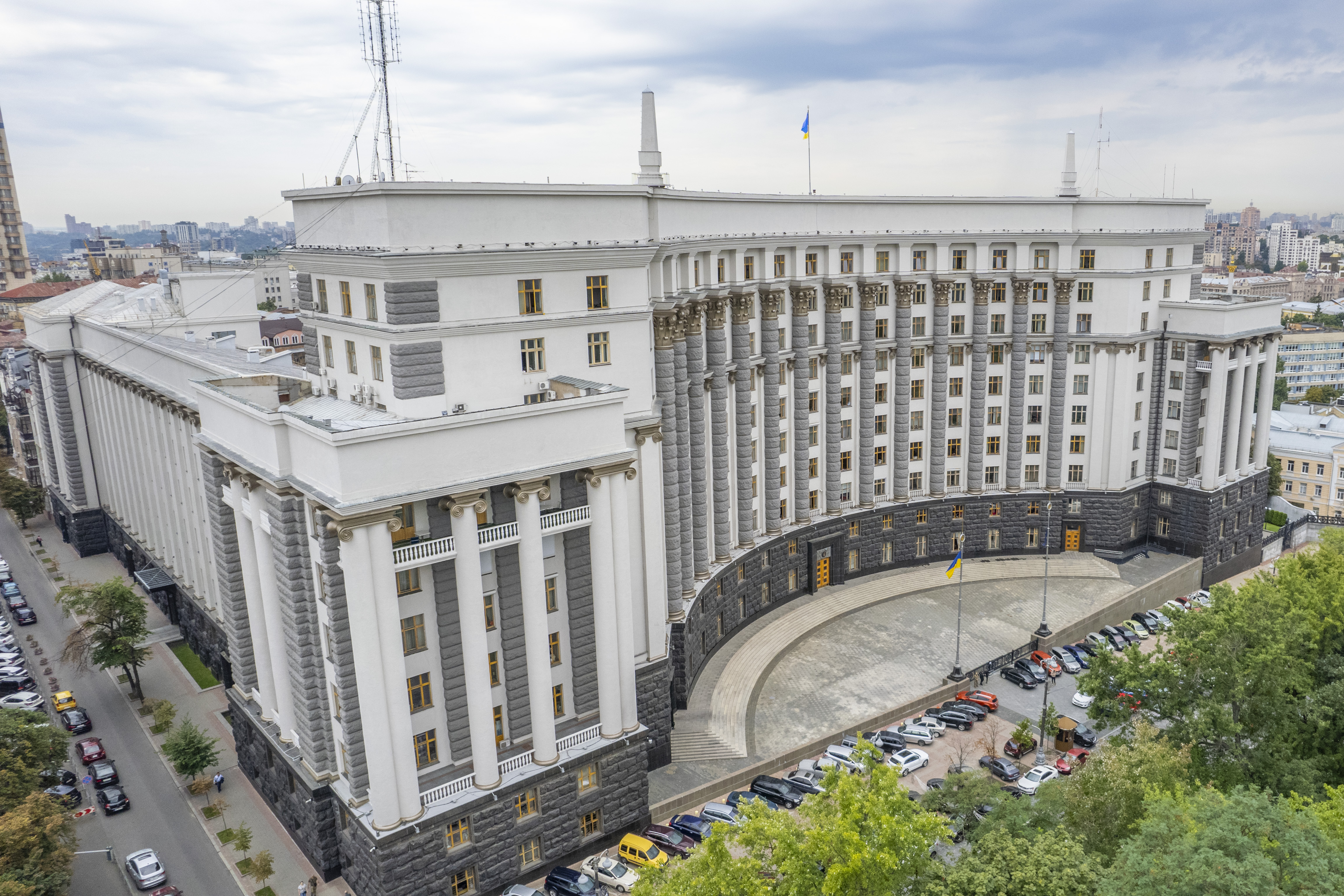
Cabinet of Ministers Building in Kyiv (1936-1938)

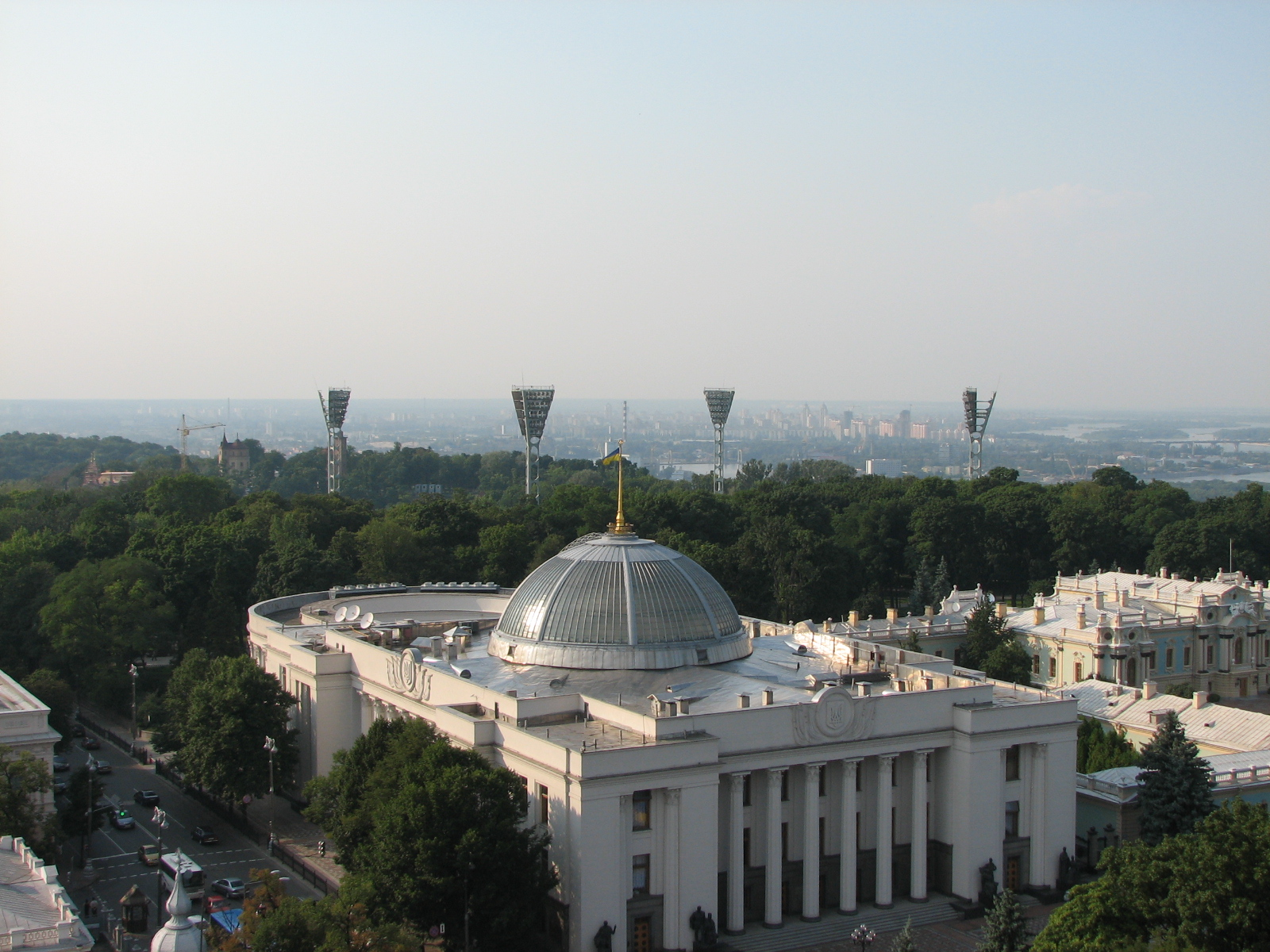
Verkhovna Rada building in Kyiv (1936-1938)

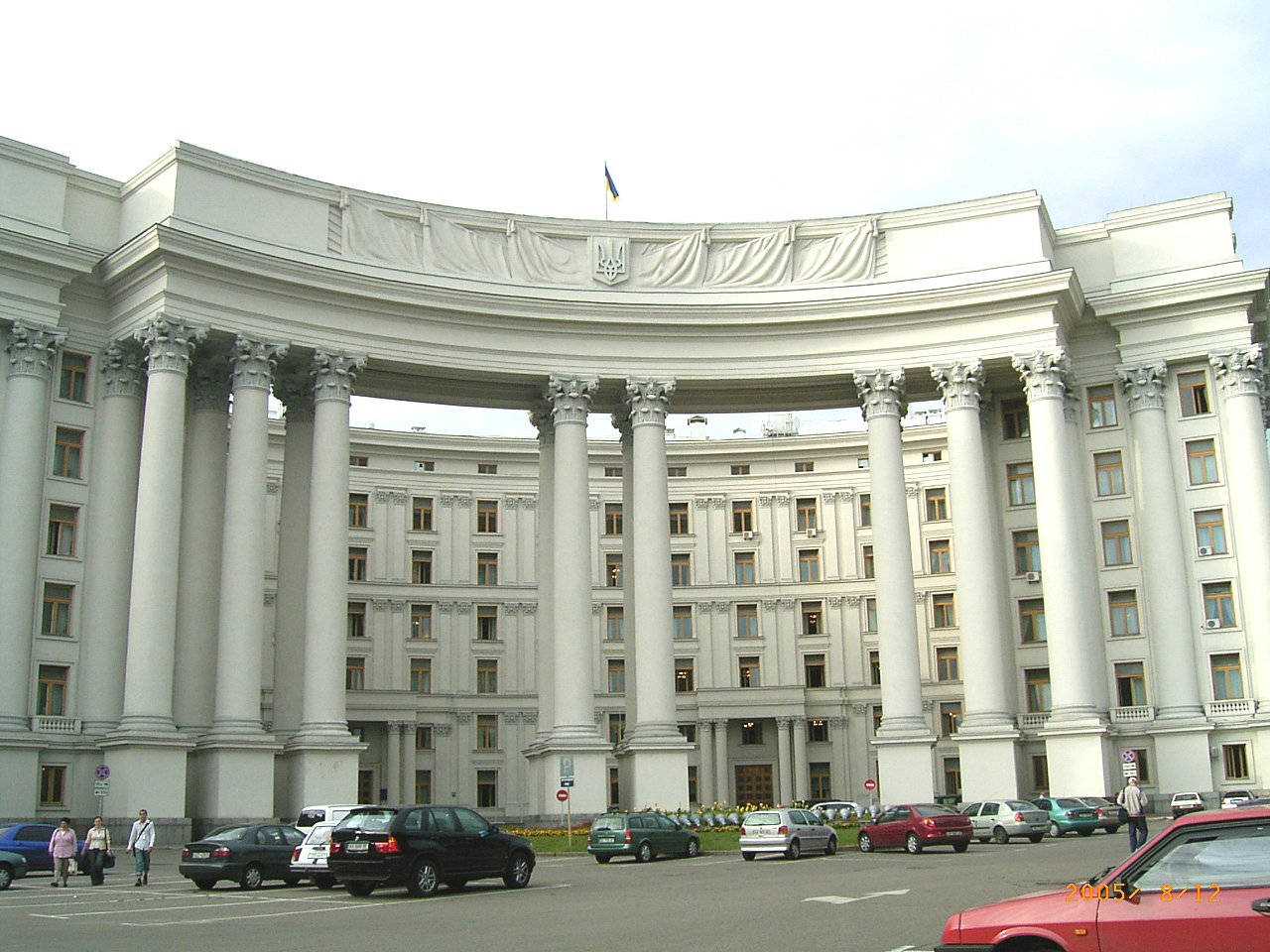
The Ukrainian Ministry of Foreign Affairs Building, Kyiv (completed 1939)

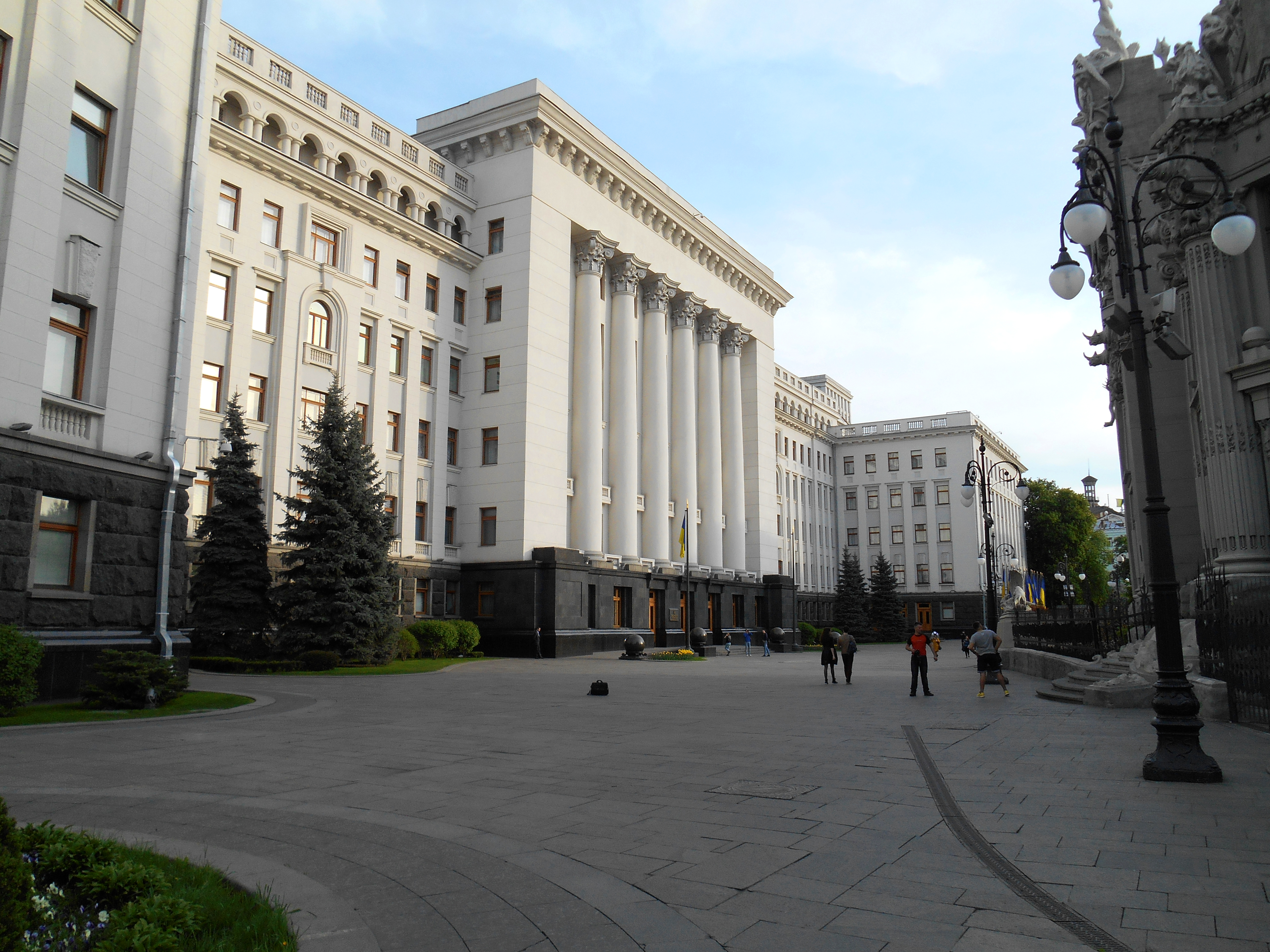
Presidential Administration building, Kyiv (1936-1939)

Hotel Ukraine, Luhansk (1944–1947)

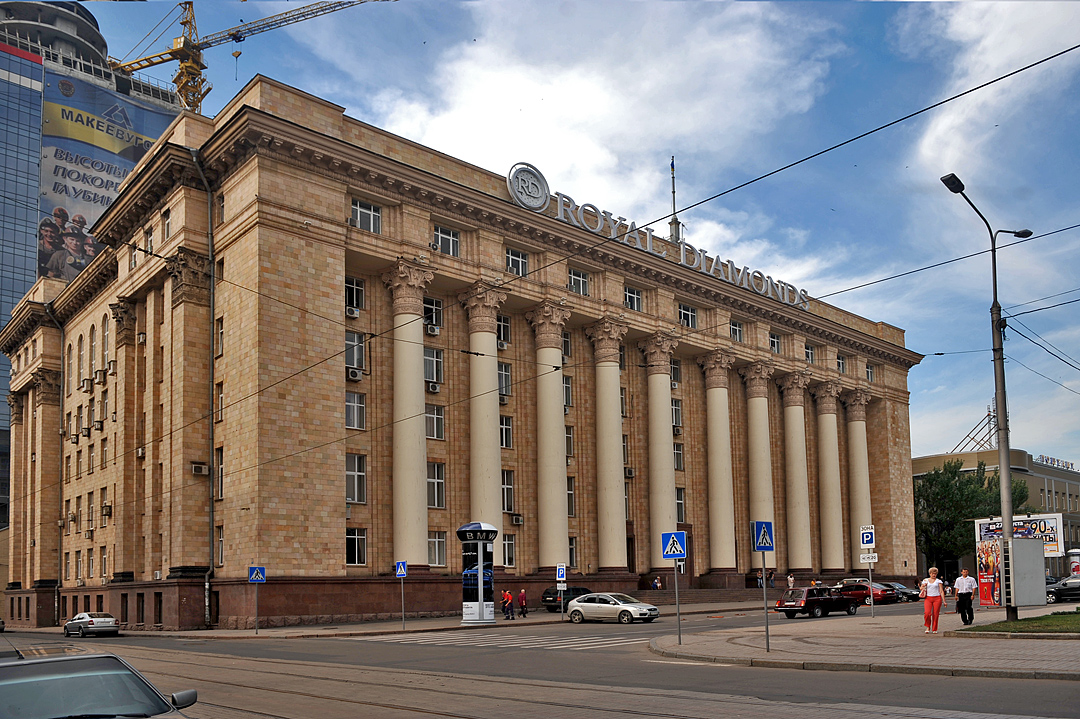
Ministry of Coal Industry building, Donetsk (1956)

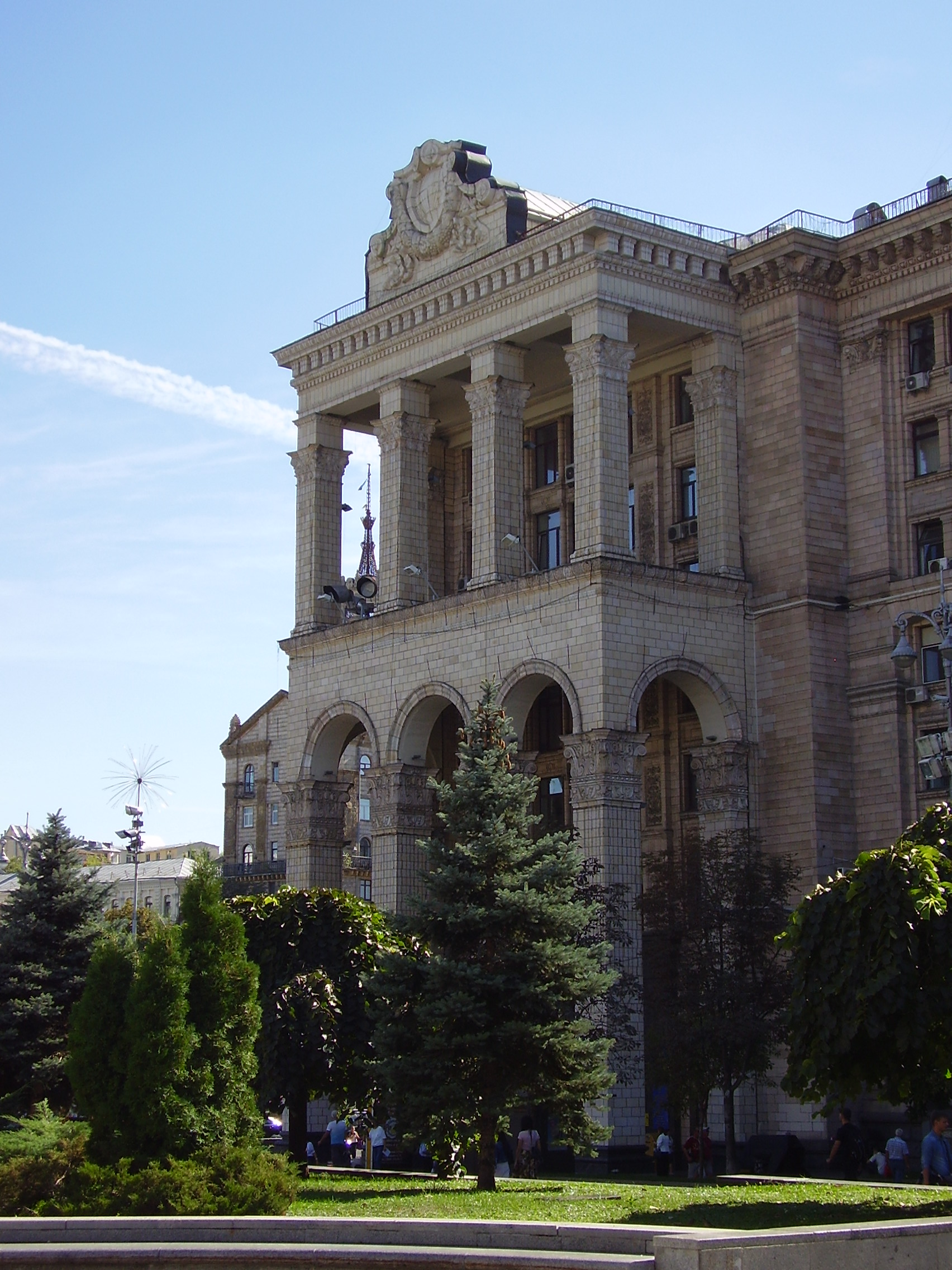
Main Post Office building, Kyiv (1952-1958)

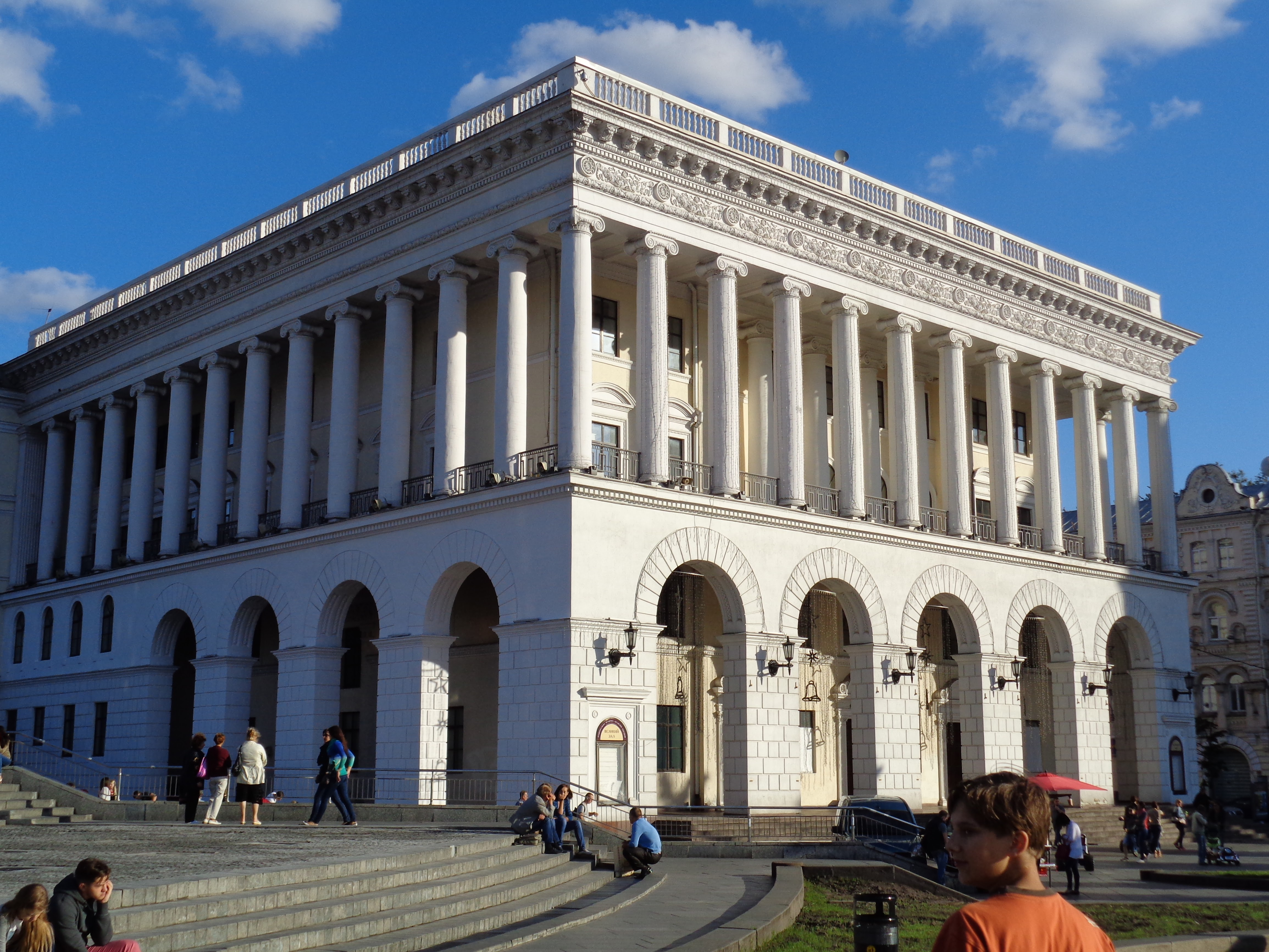
Kyiv Conservatory building (1890s, rebuilt 1955-1958)

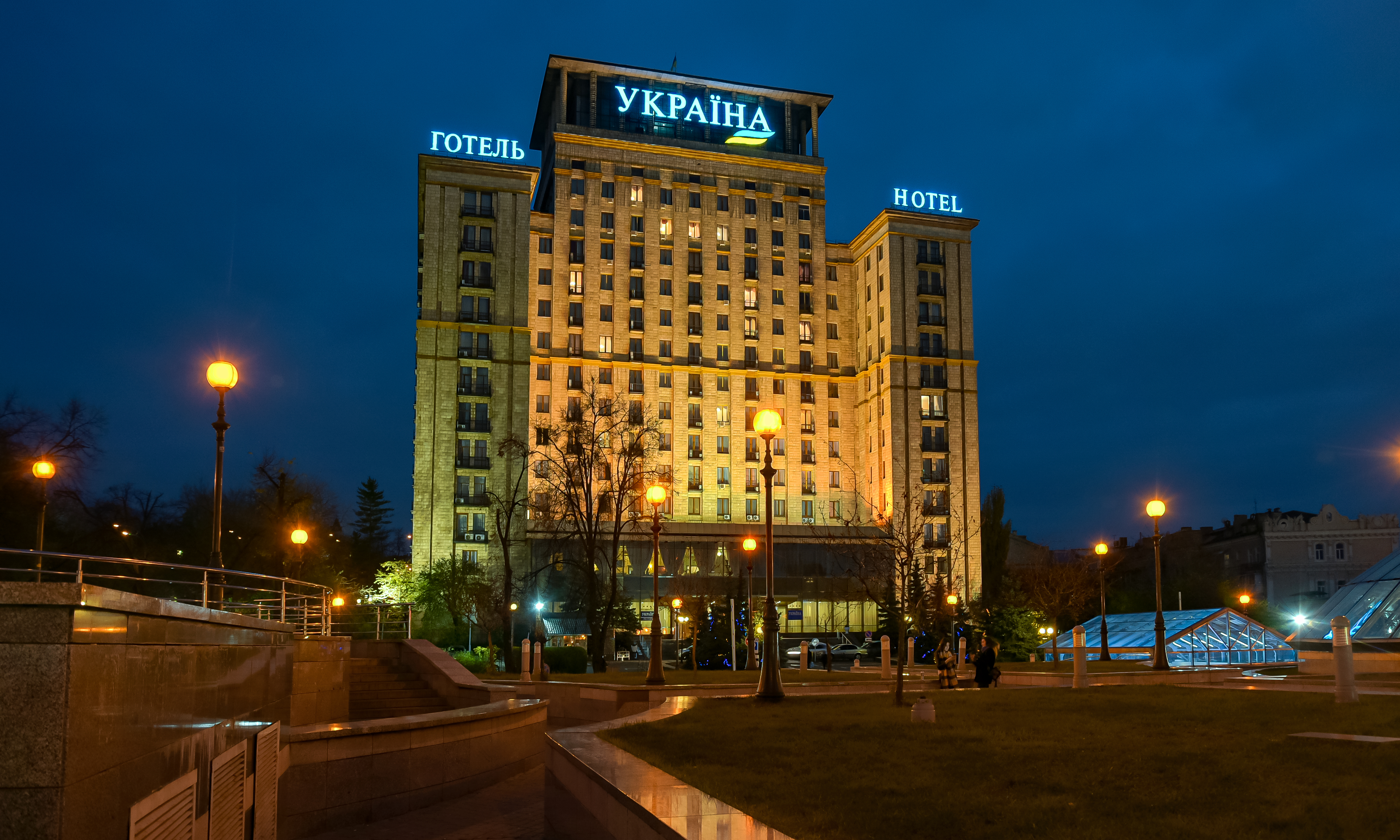
Hotel Ukraine, Kyiv (1955-1961)

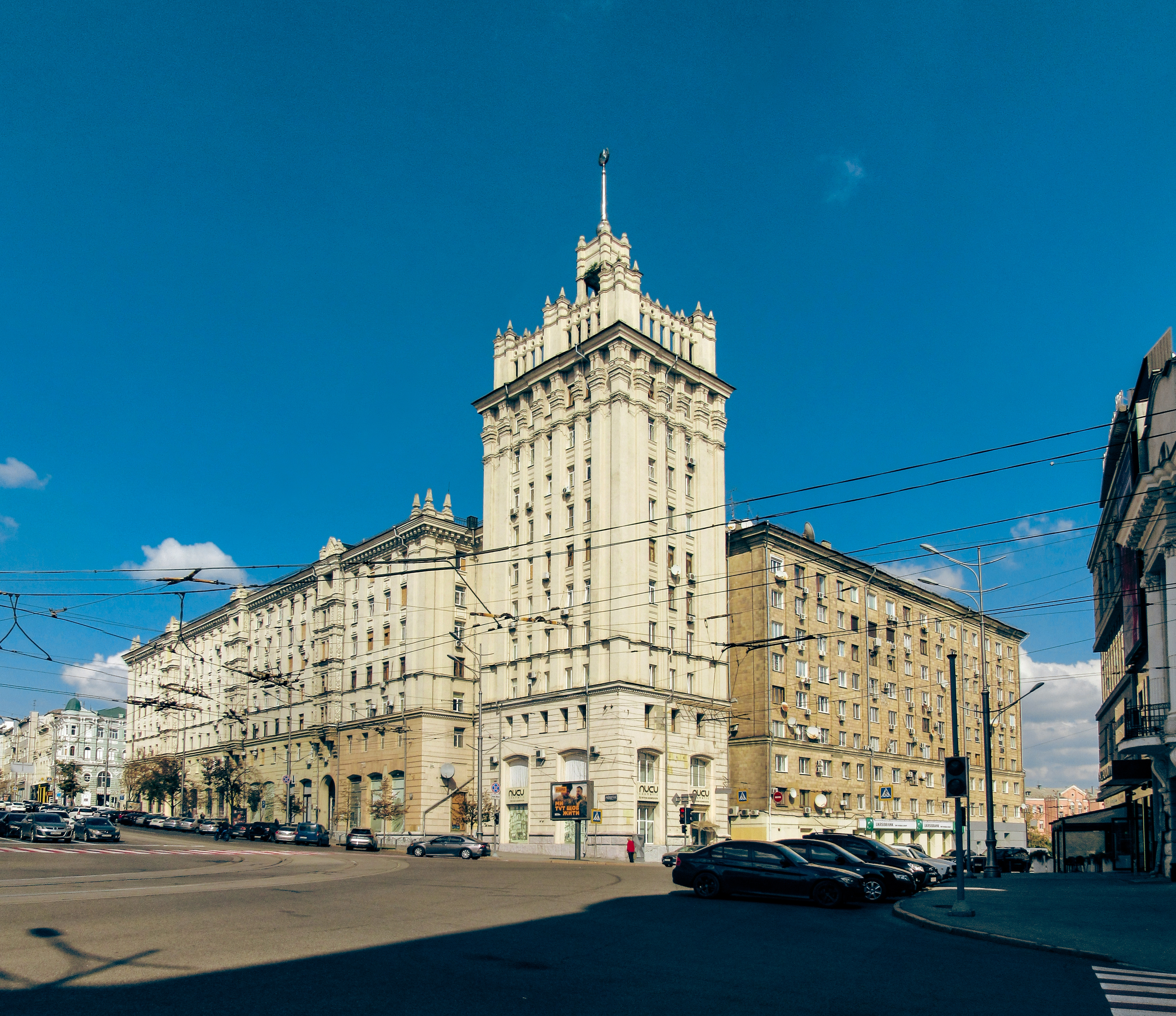
Building on Constitution Square, Kharkiv (1950-1967)

==== Later Soviet-era projects ====
In 1949, construction began on the first stage of the Kyiv Metro, which opened in 1960. During the Soviet Period, Metro stations were decorated with particularly vivid designs. The first three stations that were built by Ukrainian architects, were not actually located in Ukraine. They are all known under one name Kievskaya, and are located on the Moscow Metro under the Kiyevsky Rail Terminal.

All of the stations there are considered as monuments of architecture, due to their unique authentic character, that latter stations of the 1960s would lose in face of changing policy towards utilitarianism. In 1967, construction began on the first stage of the Kharkiv Metro, which opened in 1975, this was soon joined by the Kryvyi Rih Metrotram in 1986 and the Dnipro Metro in 1995.

In Kyiv notable projects of the later Soviet era include the Palace of Sports, Palace "Ukraine" and Flowers of Ukraine building.

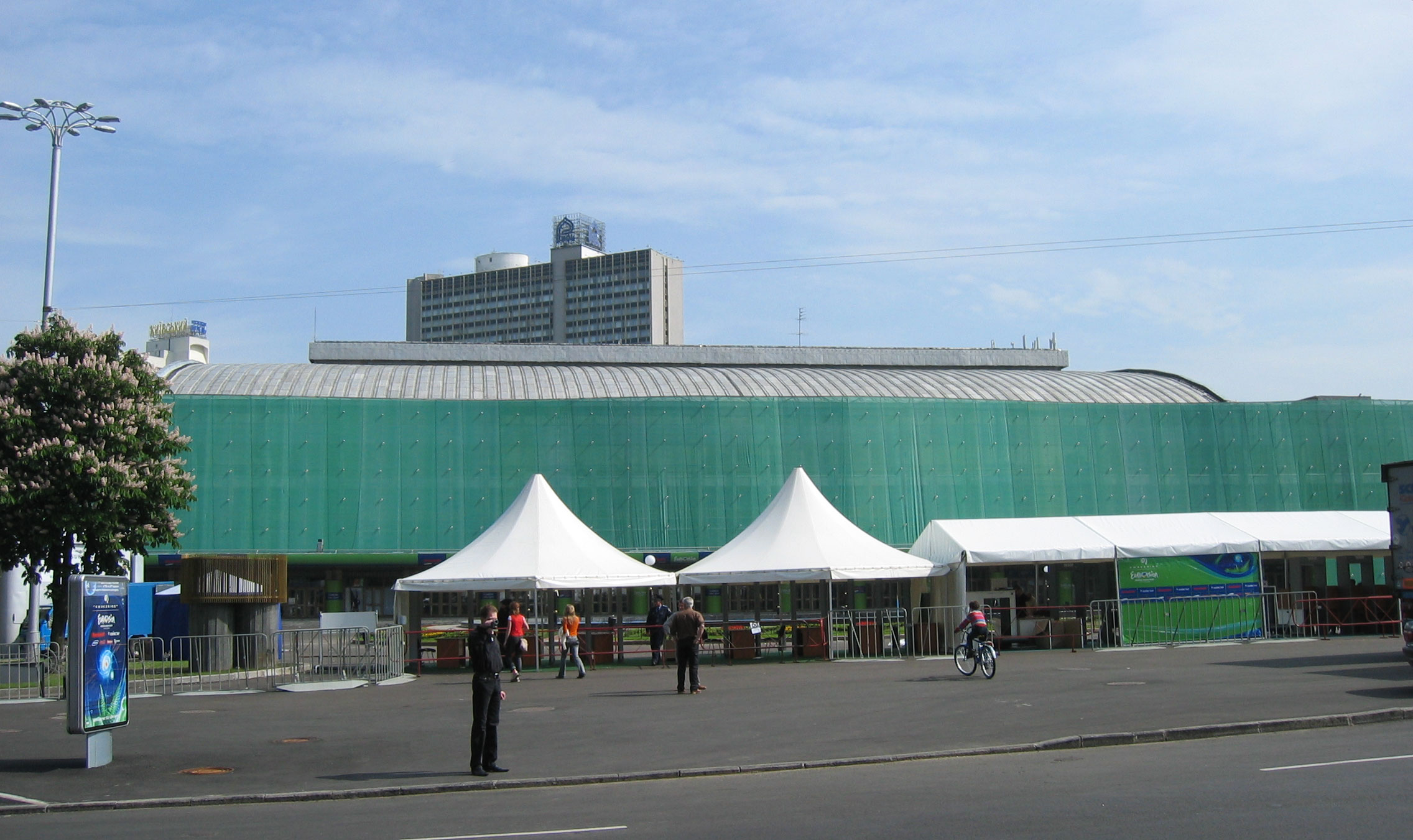
Kyiv Palace of Sports (1958-1960)

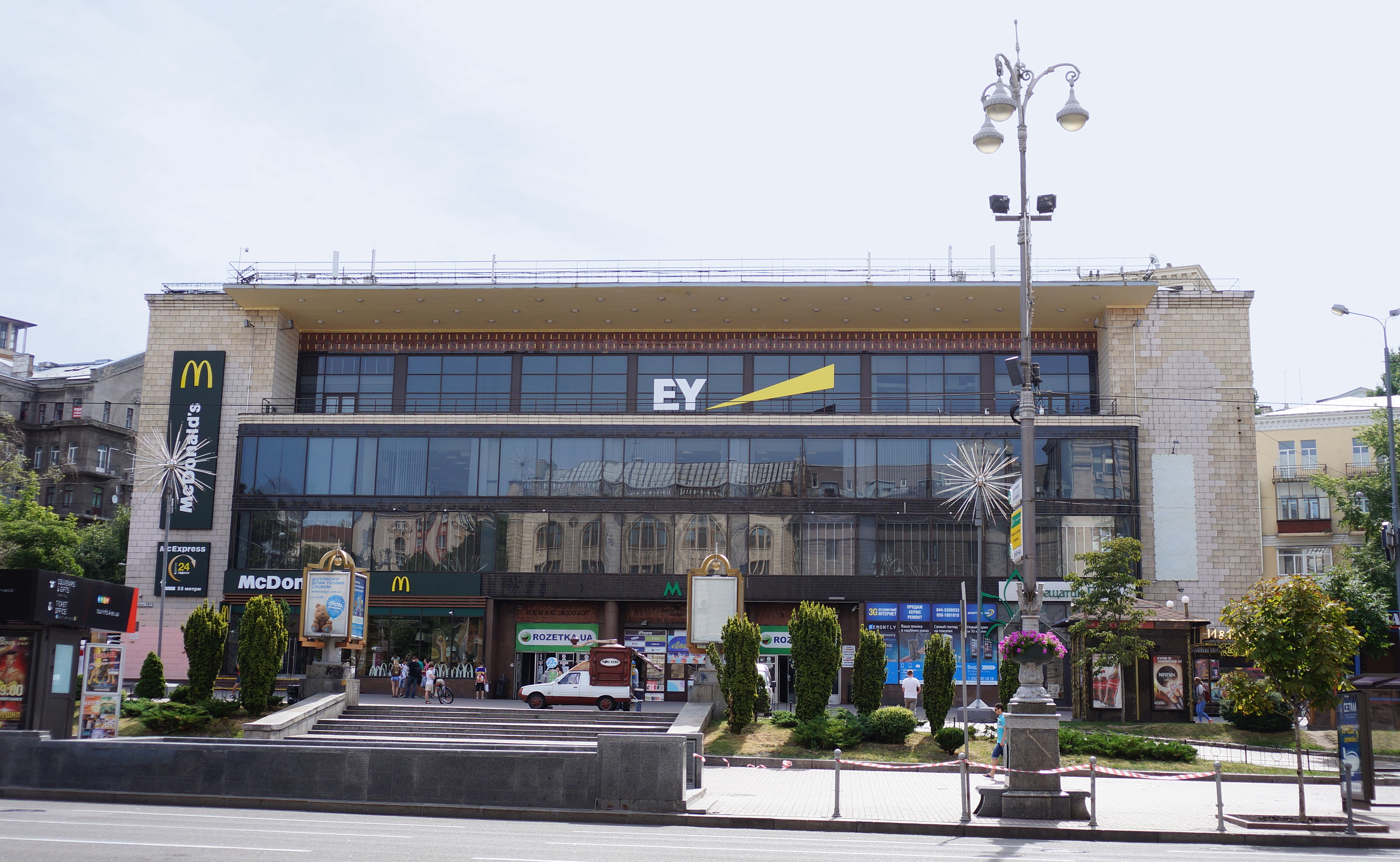
One of the vestibules of Khreshchatyk metro station (1960)

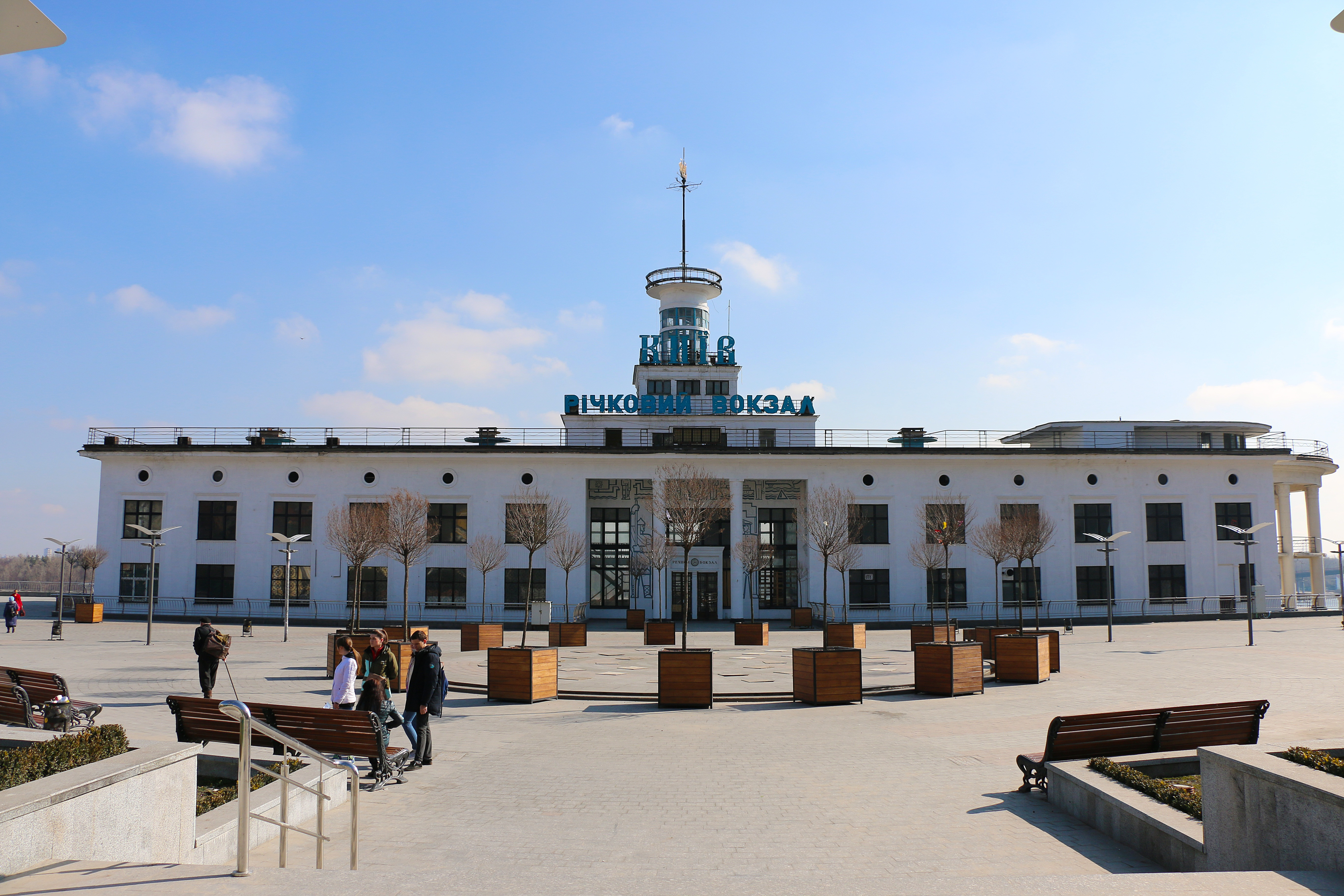
Kyiv River Terminal (1957-1961)

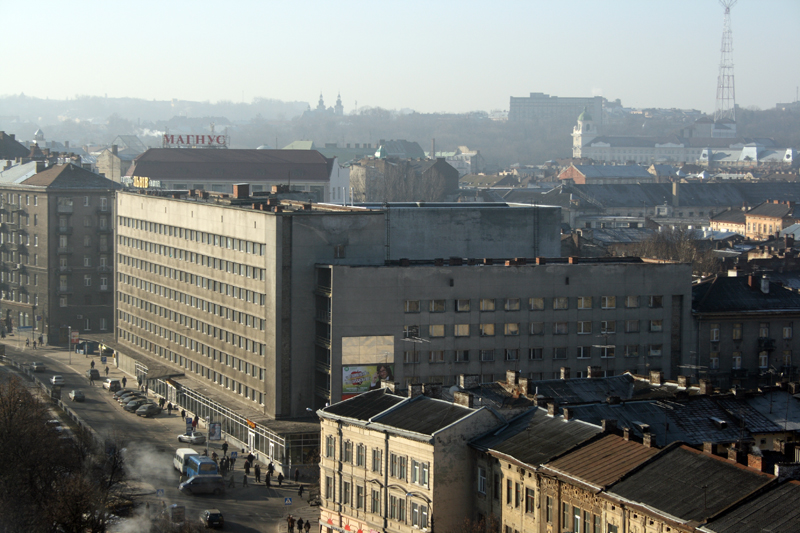
Lviv Hotel (1965)

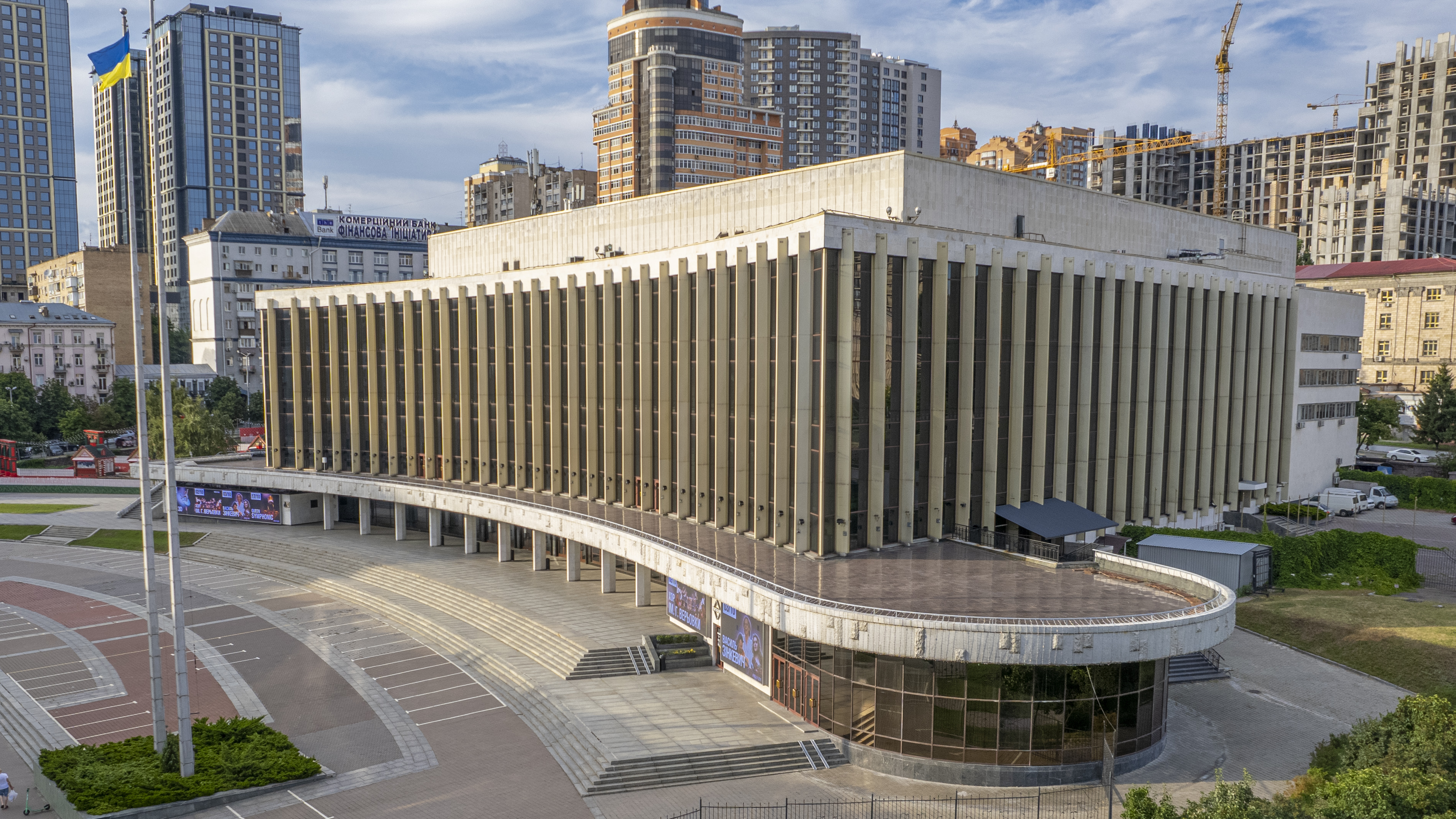
"Ukraine" Palace in Kyiv (1965-1970)

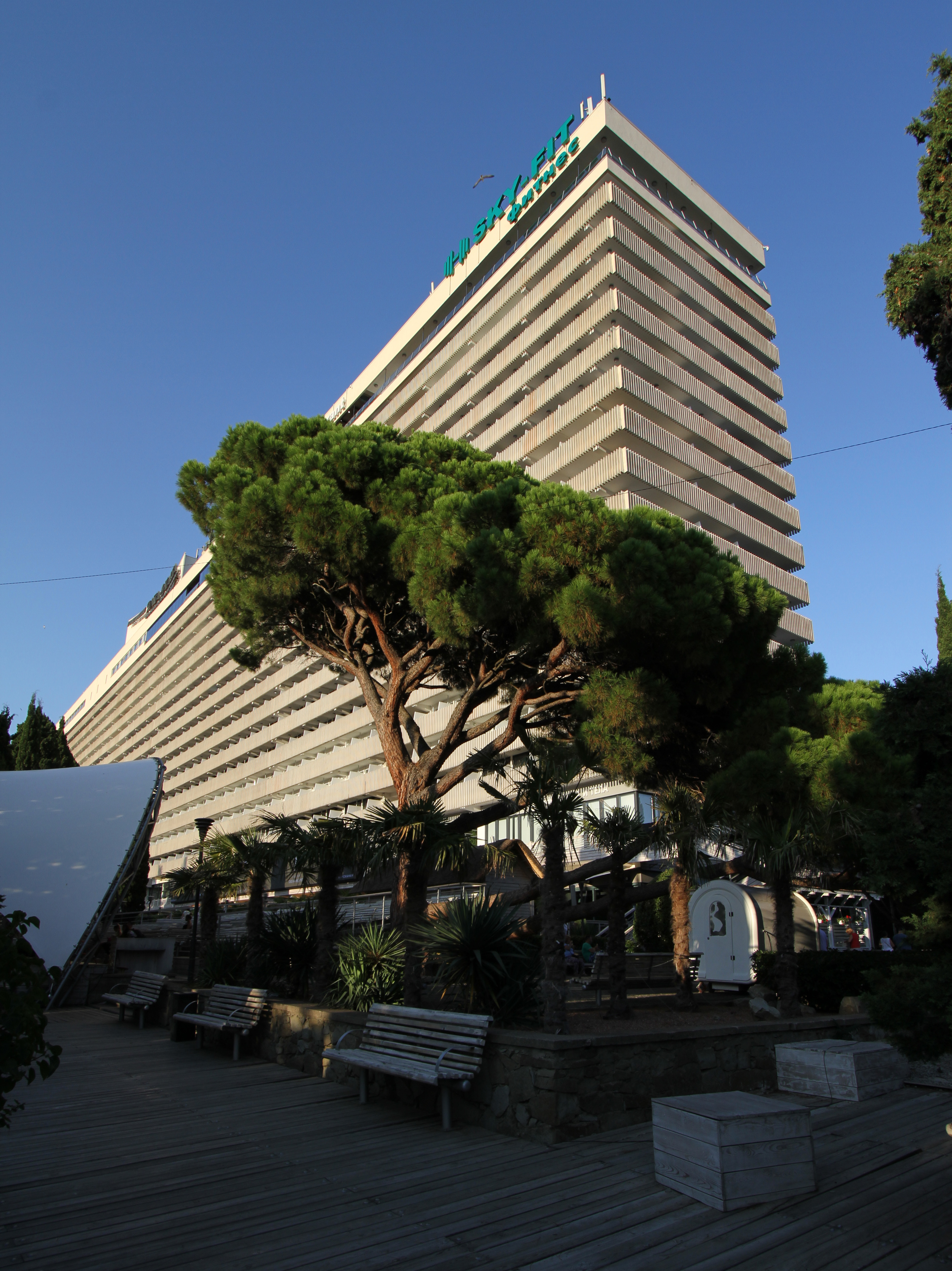
Yalta Intourist hotel (1974-1977)

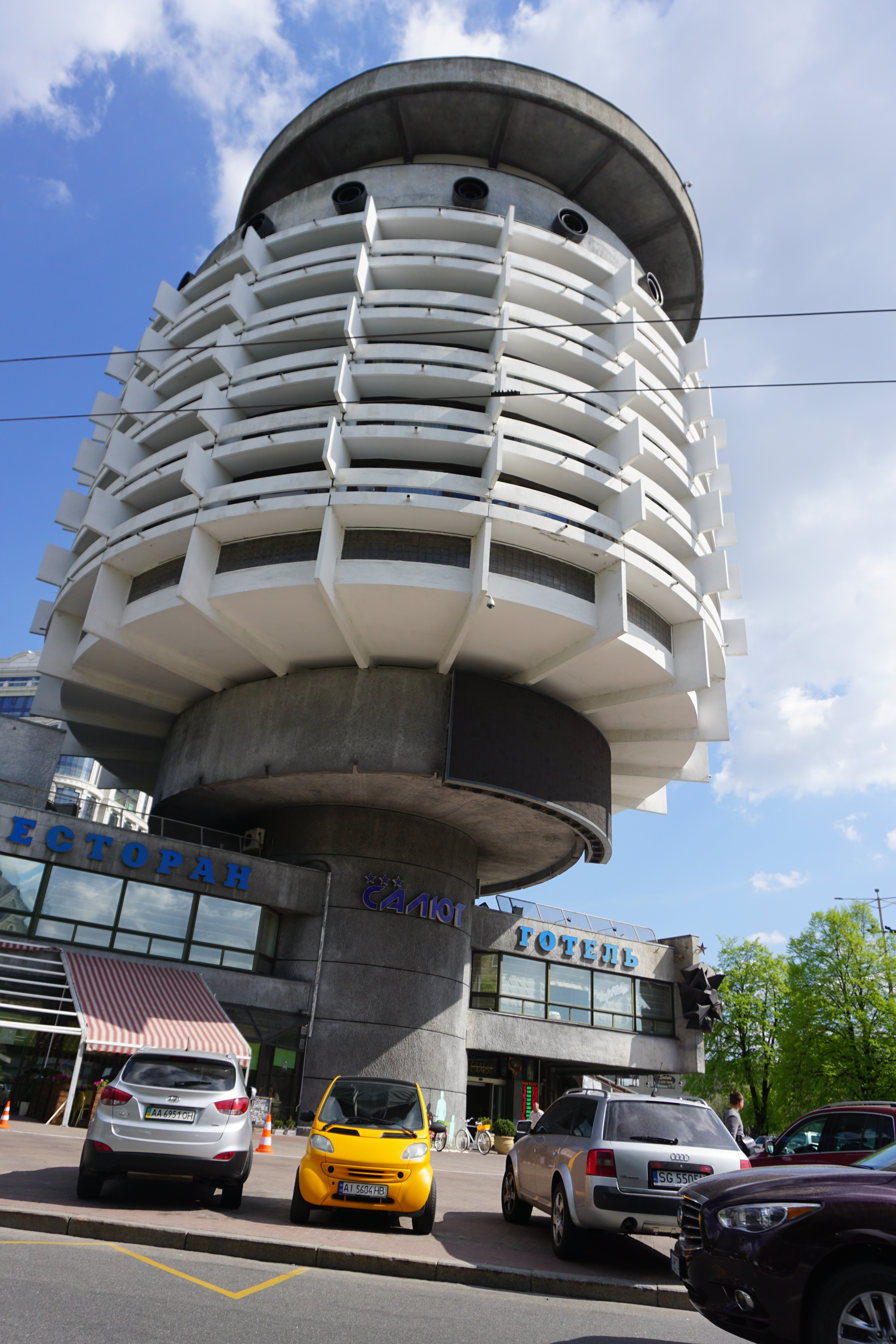
Salute Hotel, Kyiv (1982-1984)

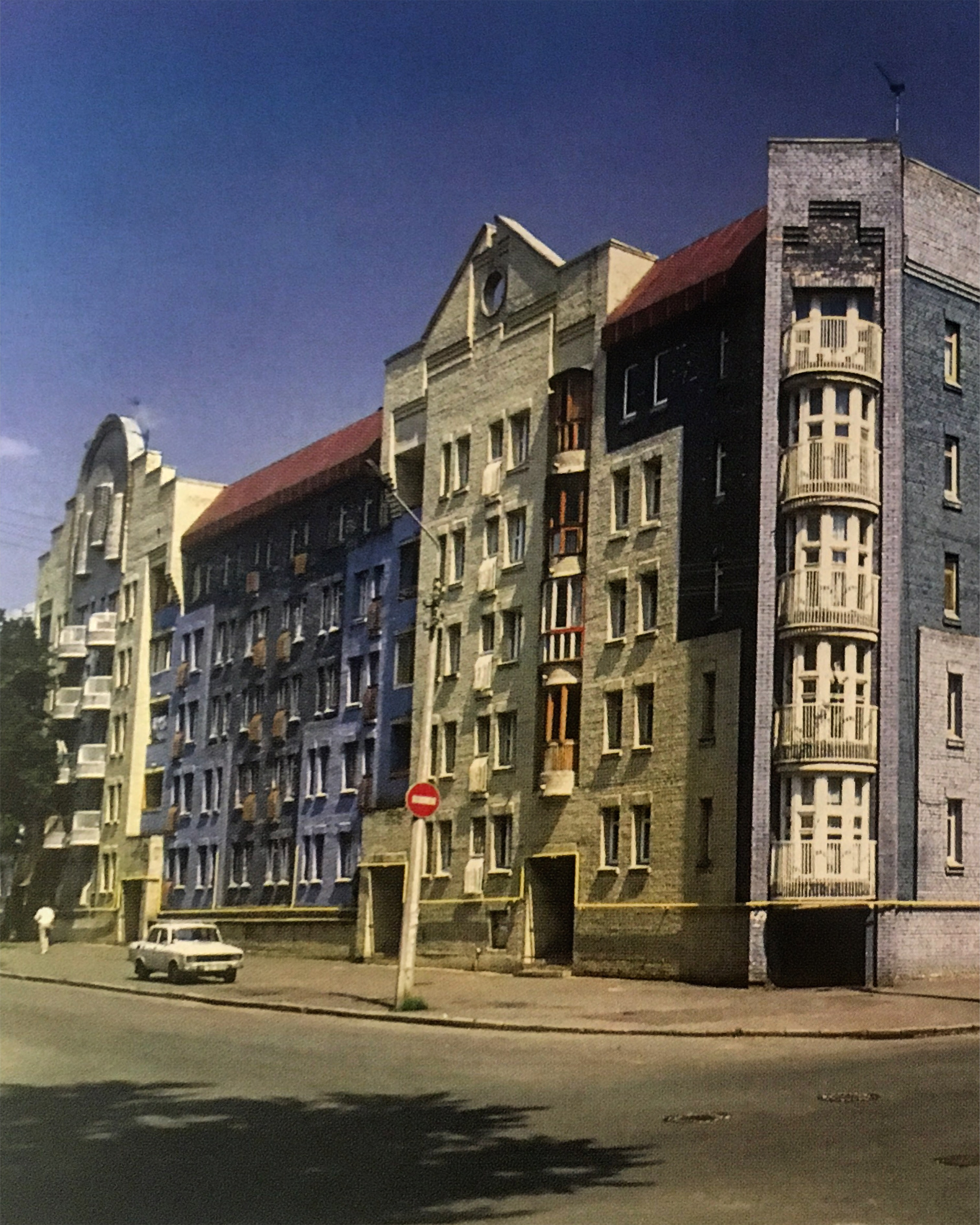
Rozenberg Quarter in Podil, Kyiv (1983-1988)

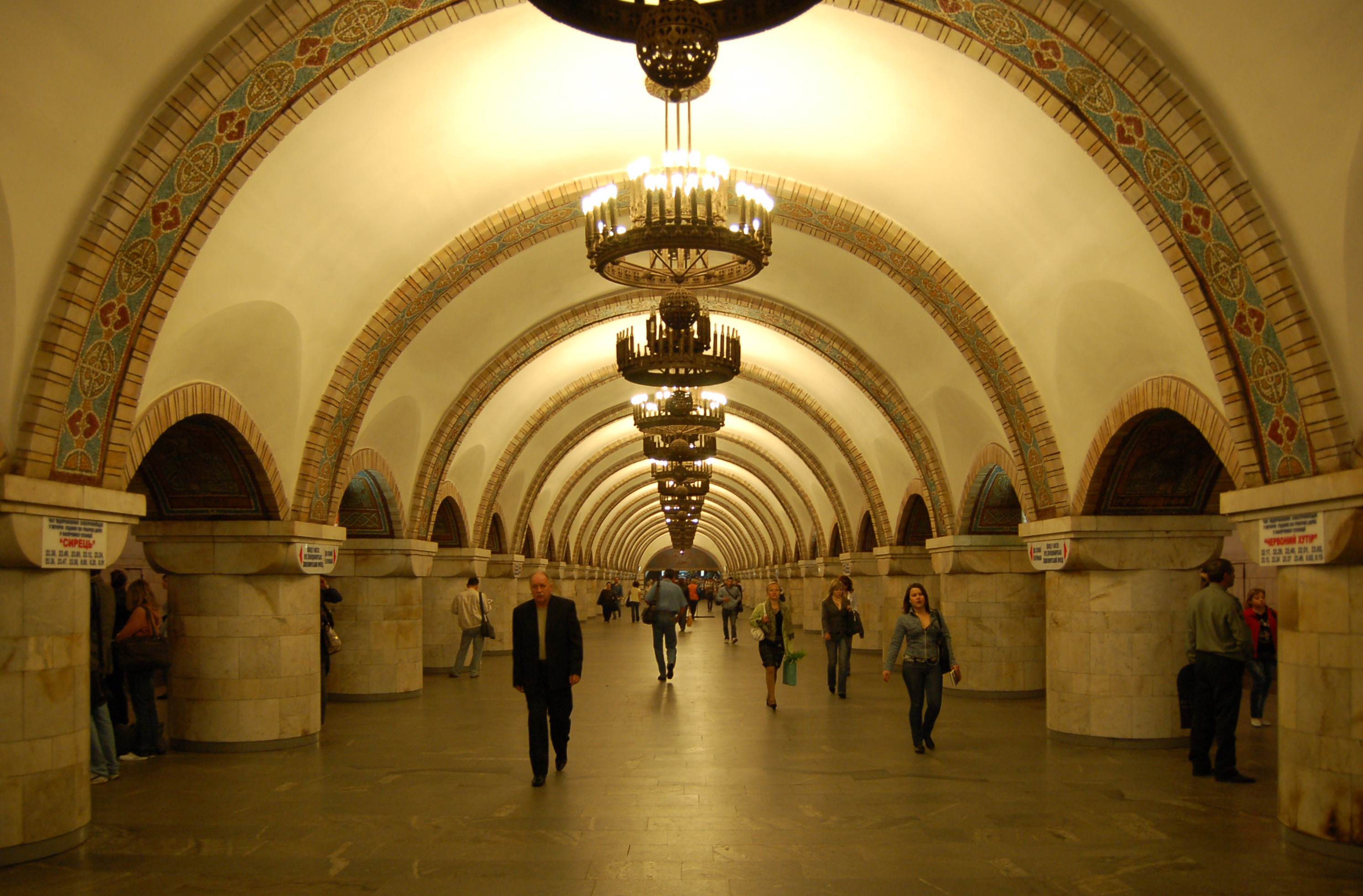
Zoloti Vorota (Kyiv Metro) (1989)

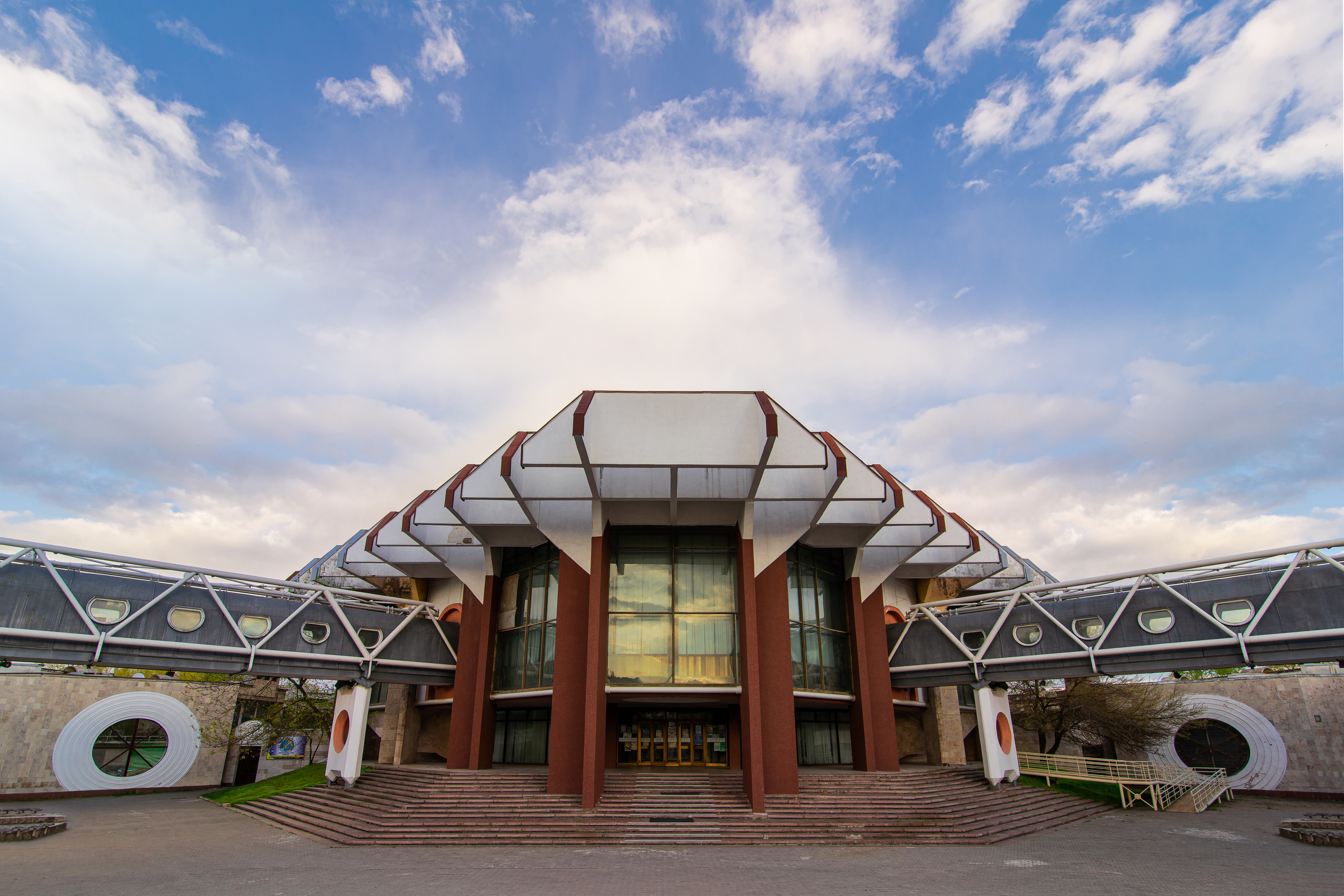
Dnipro Palace of Youth (1990)

=== Modern Ukraine ===
The language of modern architecture becomes more global and pluralistic in its artistic direction. In the works of the Ukrainian architects, postmodernism and high-tech tendencies can be increasingly found.

Before the 2008 financial crisis, the caprom style of postmodern architecture became prominent in Ukraine. Categorized by an eclectic mix of elements of classical, modernist and contemporary architecture, the style often receive a negative assessment of contemporaries as "kitsch". An example of modern Ukrainian architecture classified this way is the reconstruction of the Maidan Nezalezhnosti in central Kyiv in 2001, based on Moscow's Manezhnaya Square. During the construction an underground shopping mall and a number of monuments, including the Independence Monument were added to the square. The reconstruction was criticized for its usage of pseudohistoric architecture, reducing the size of the public space and the removal of the fountain located on the square.

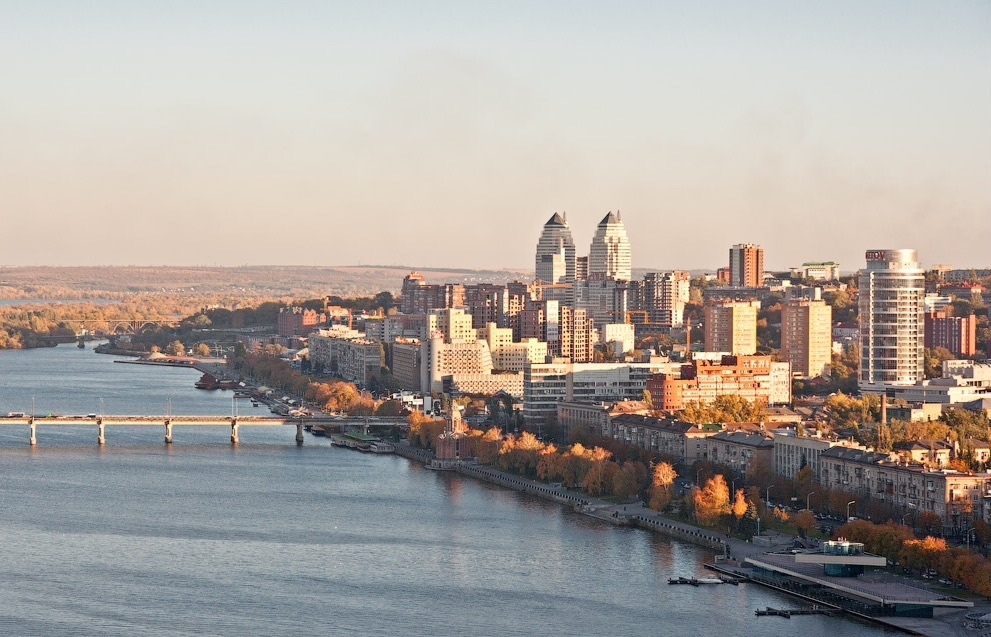
Residential buildings in Dnipro

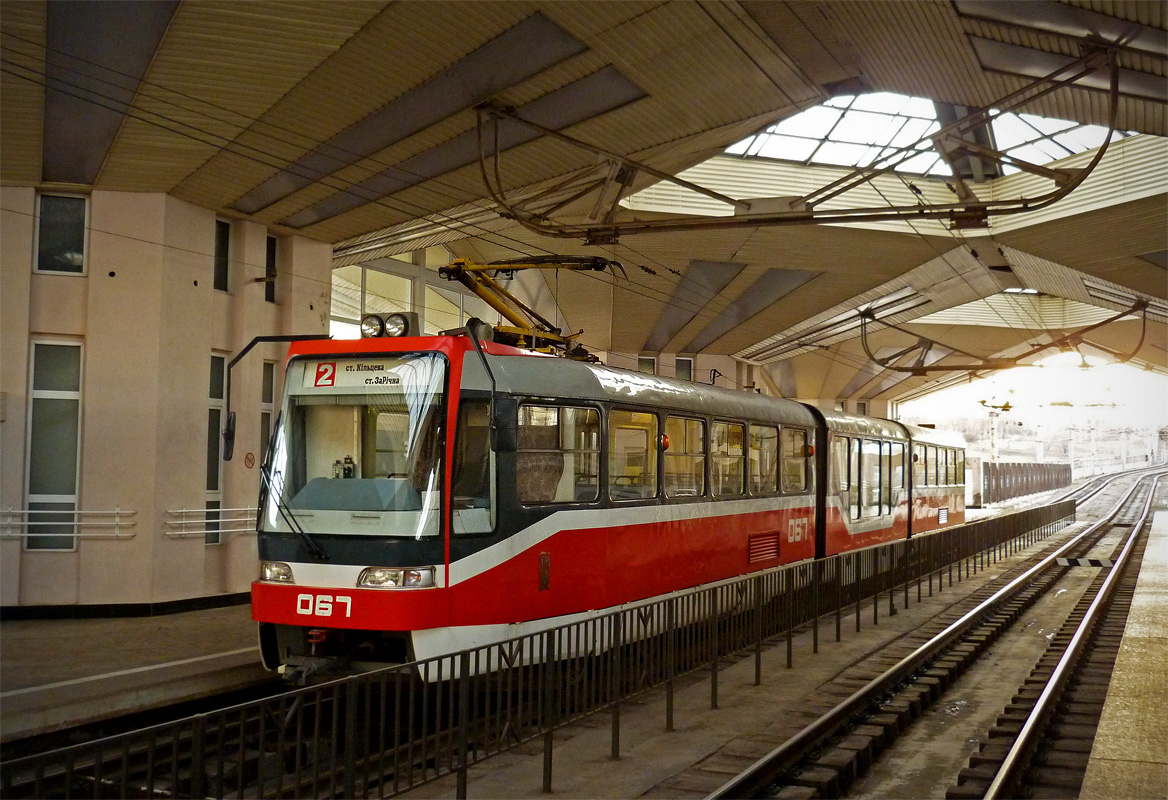
Zarichna metrotram station in Kryvyi Rih (1999)

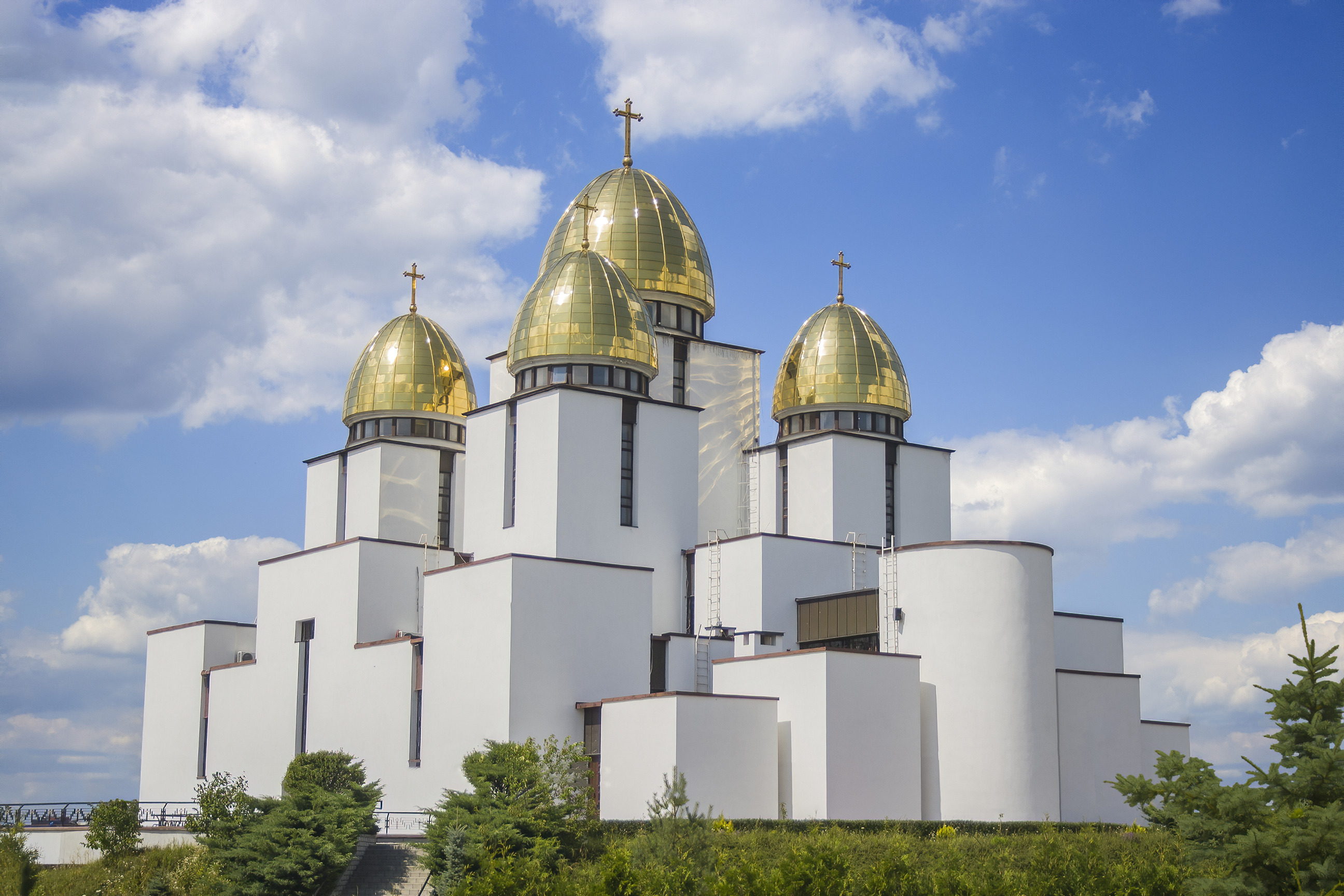
Church of the Nativity of Virgin Mary at Sykhiv, Lviv (1995-2000)

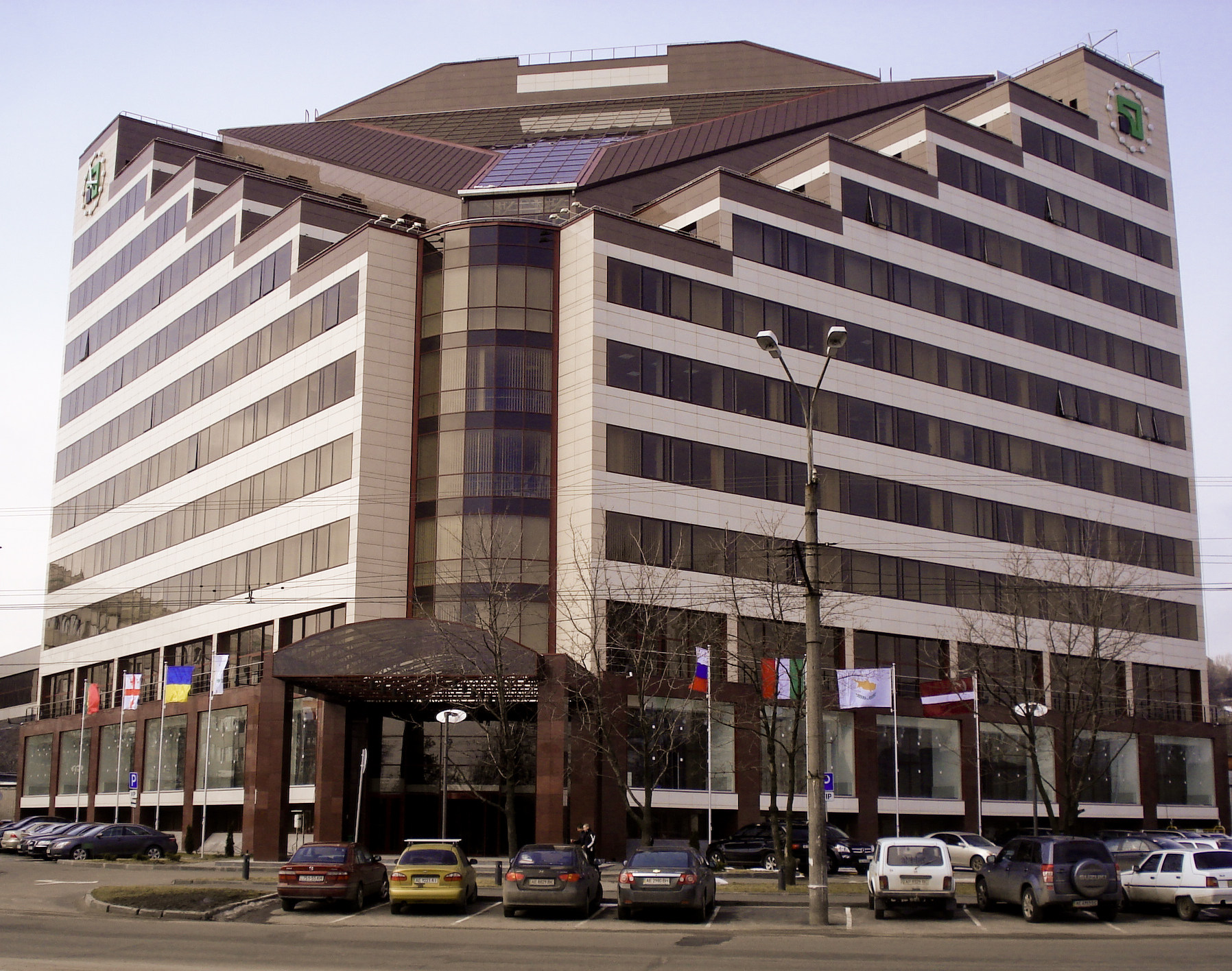
PrivatBank head office in Dnipro

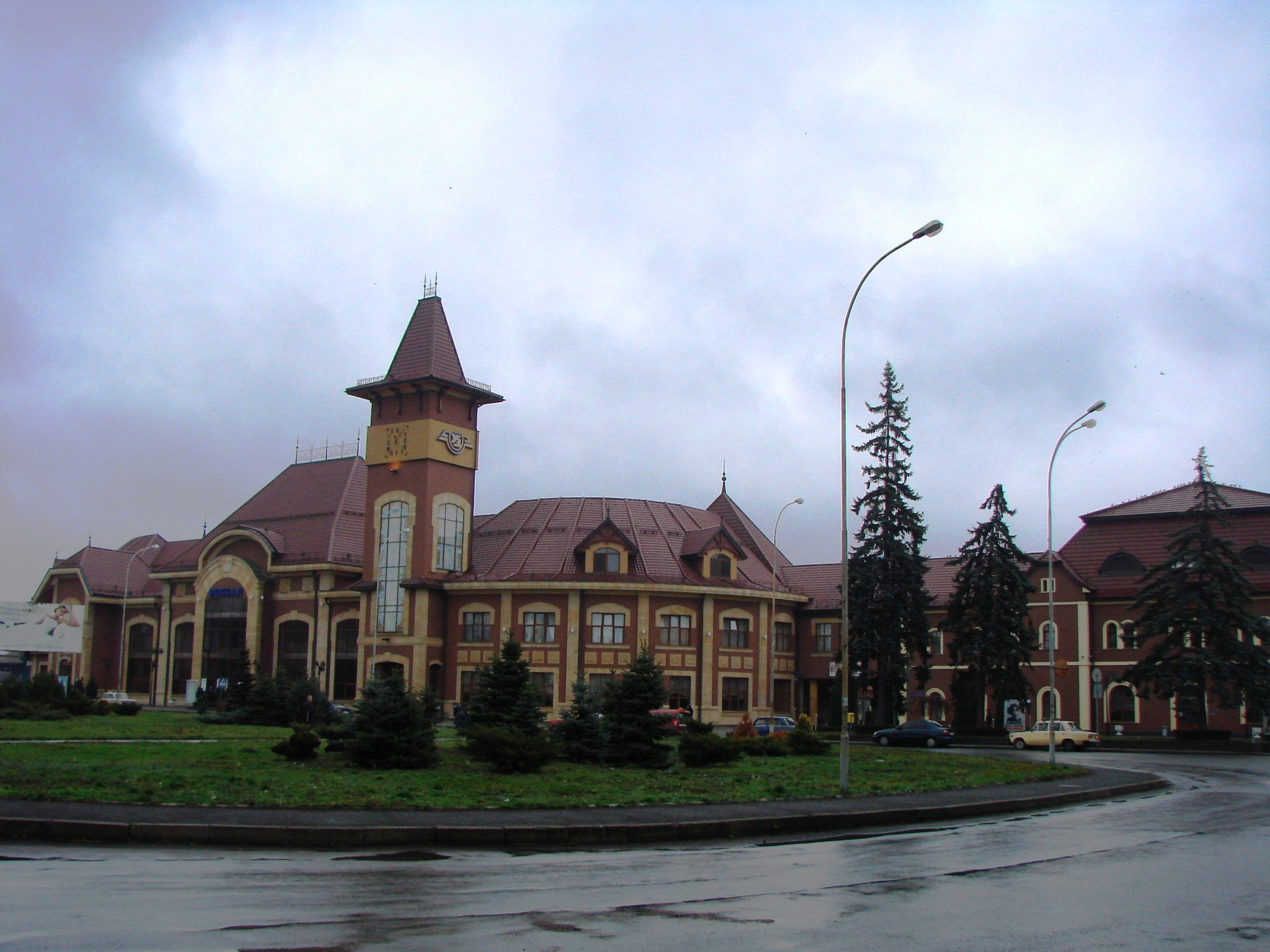
Uzhhorod railway station (2003-2004)

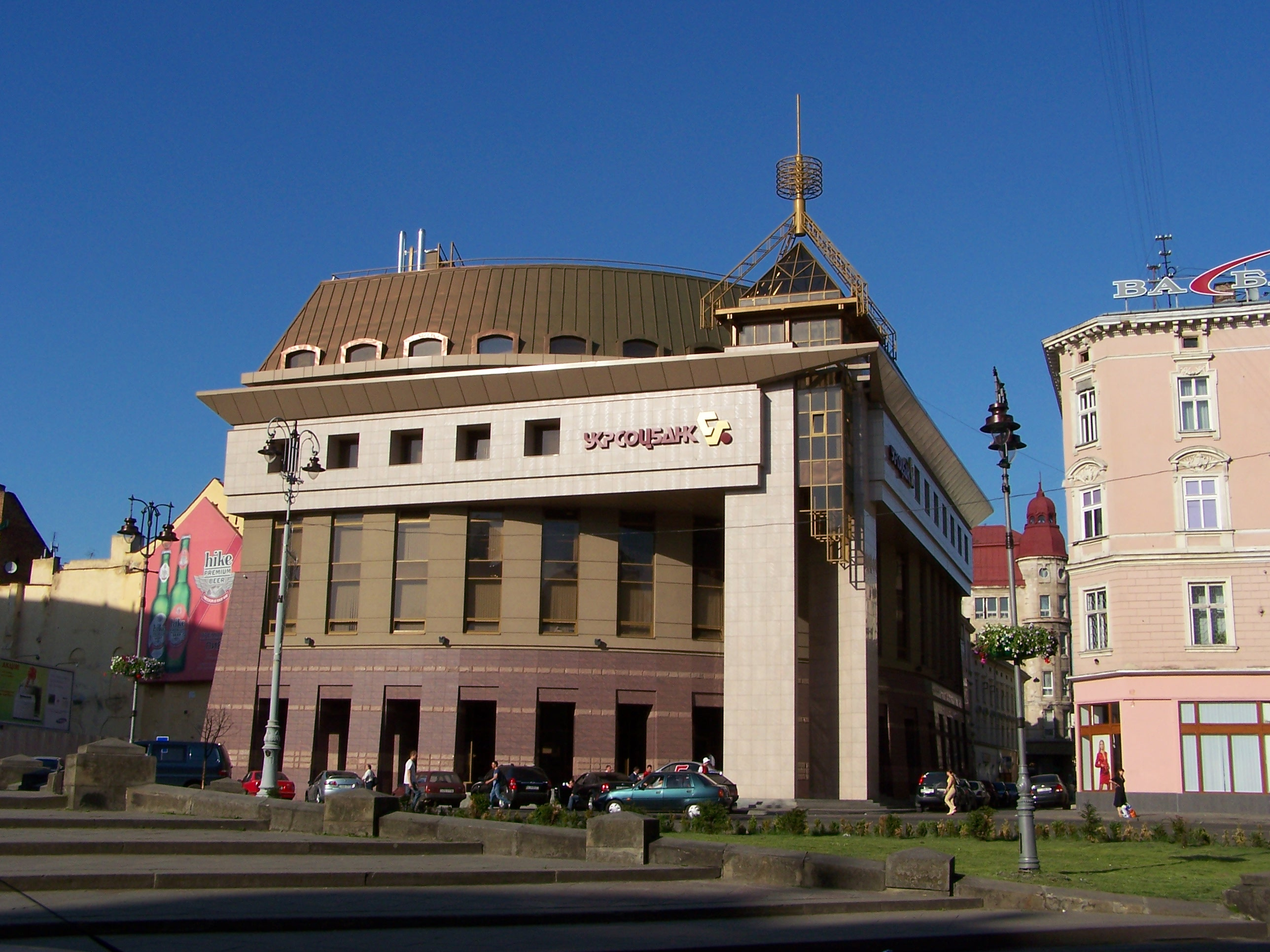
Ukrsotsbank building in Mickiewicz Square, Lviv (1998-2005)

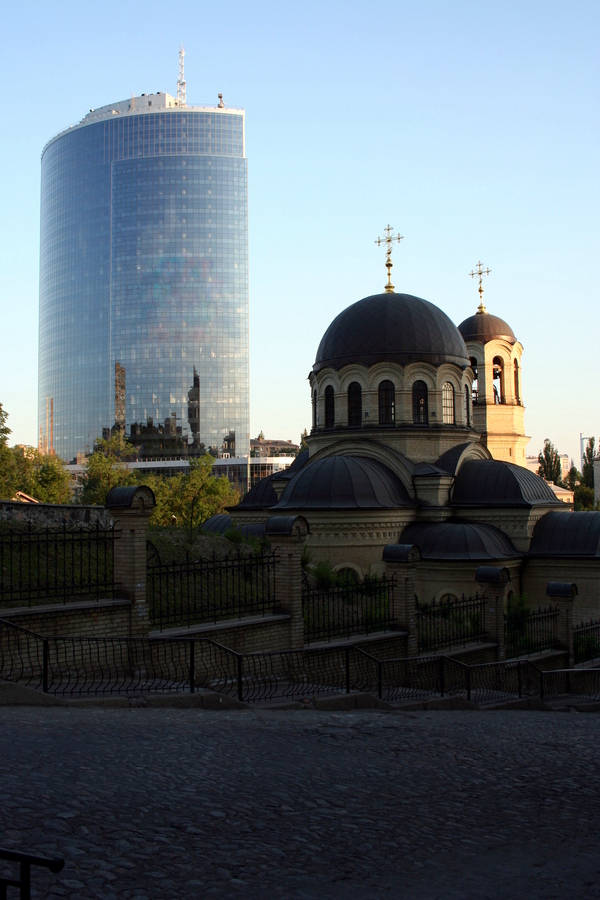
Parus Business Centre in Kyiv (left, 2004-2007)

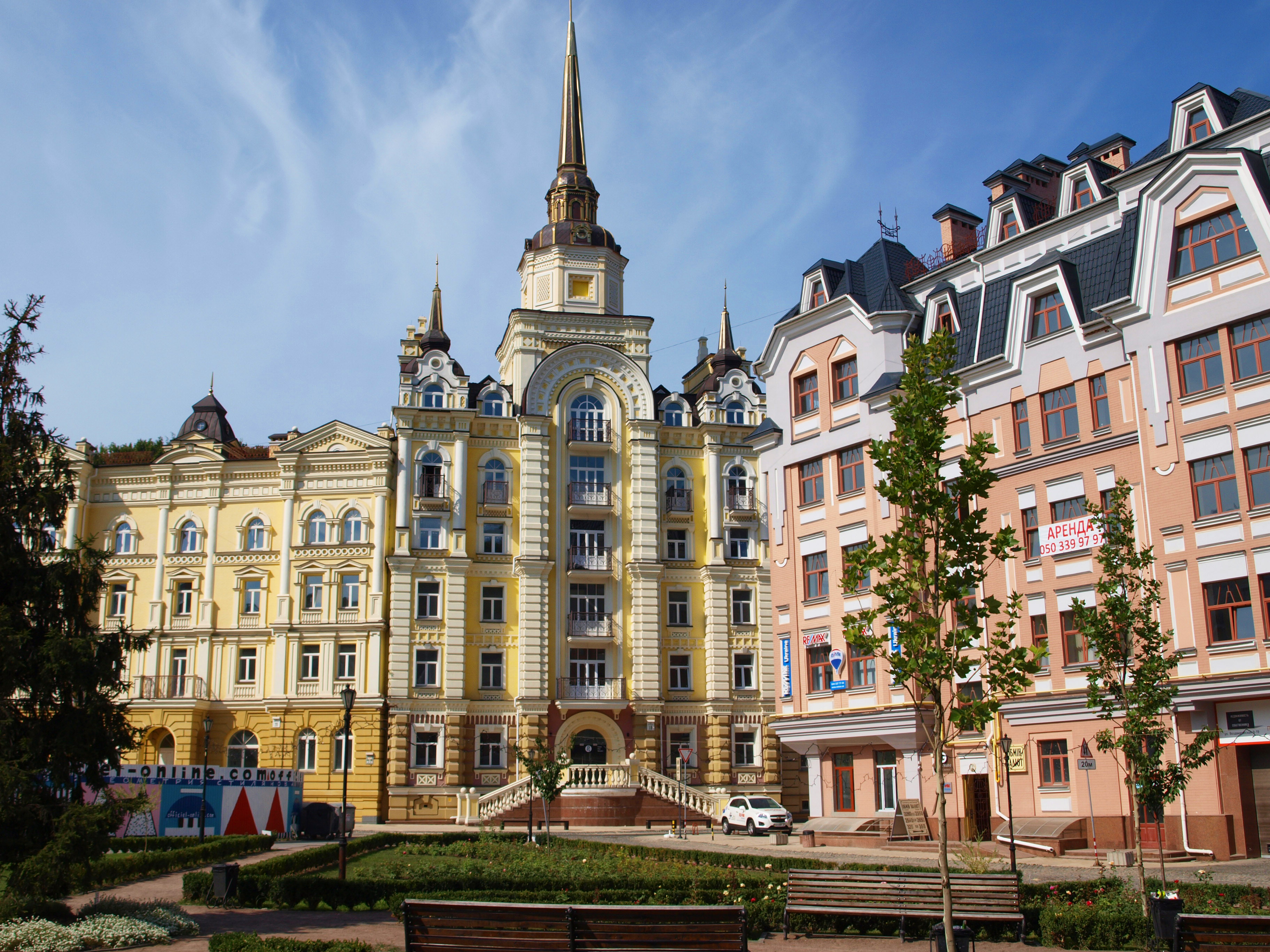
Vozdvyzhenka area in Kyiv

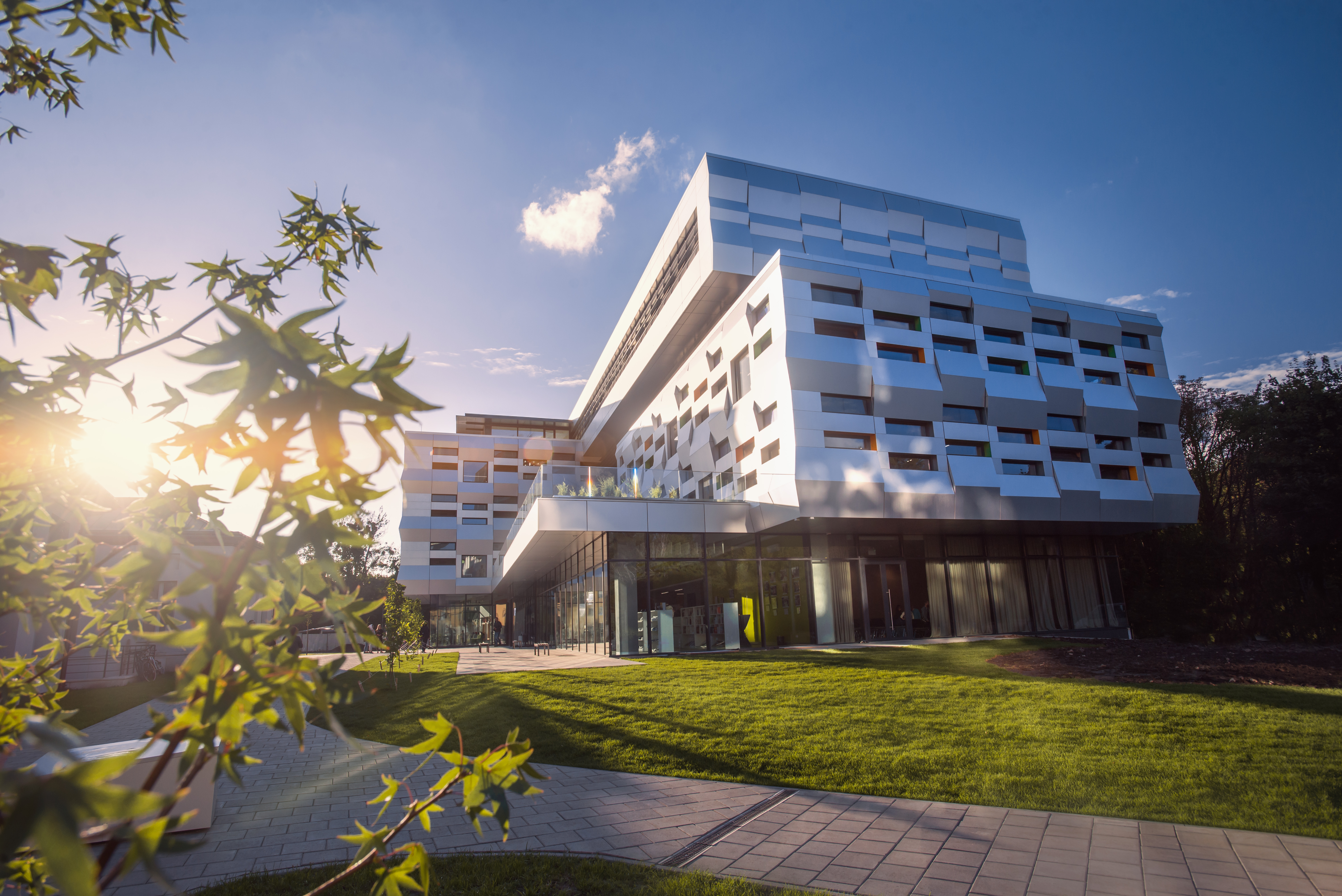
Andrey Sheptytsky Centre of the Ukrainian Catholic University, Lviv (2015-2017)

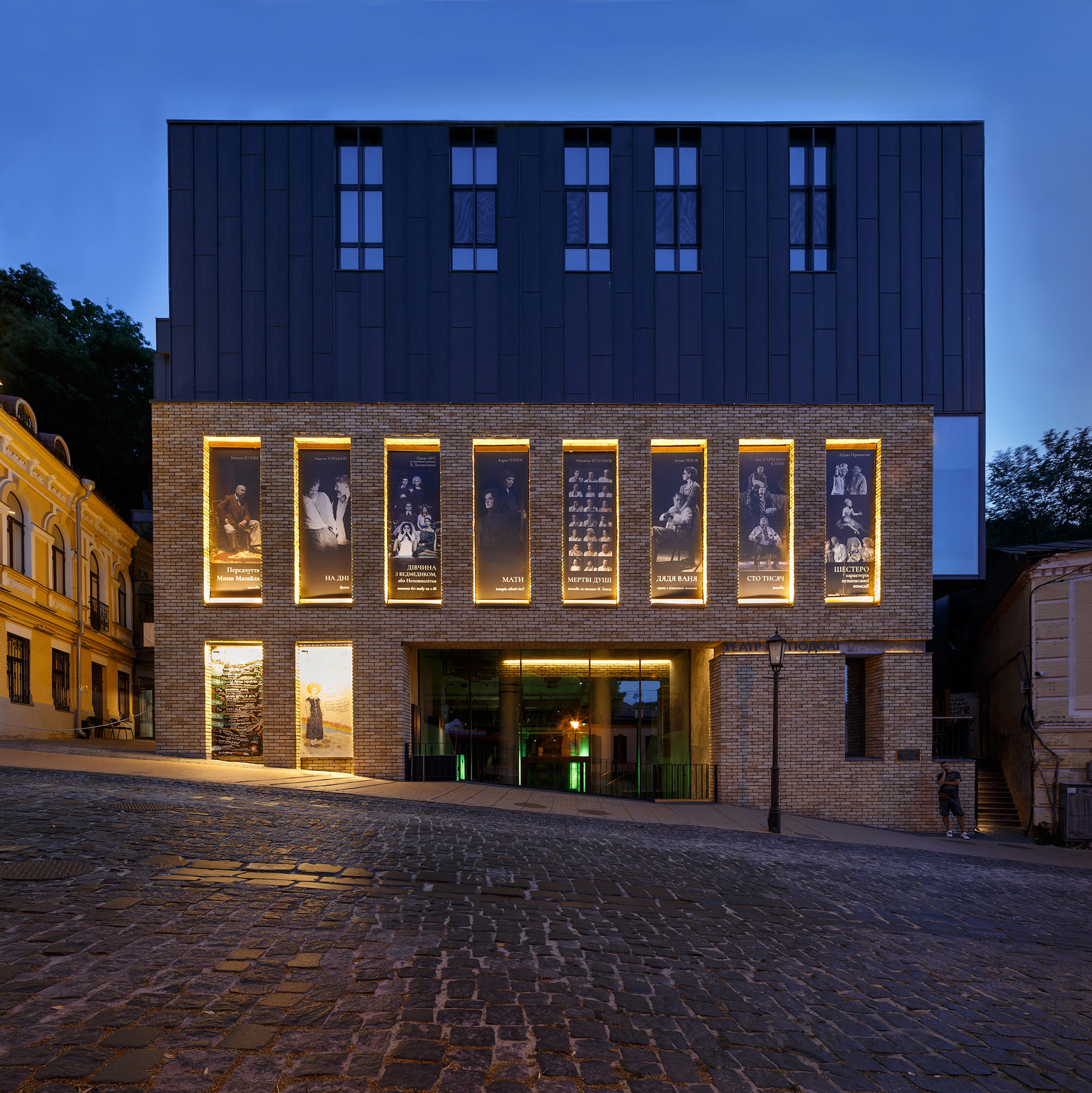
Kyiv Academic Drama Theatre on Podil, Kyiv (restored 2017)

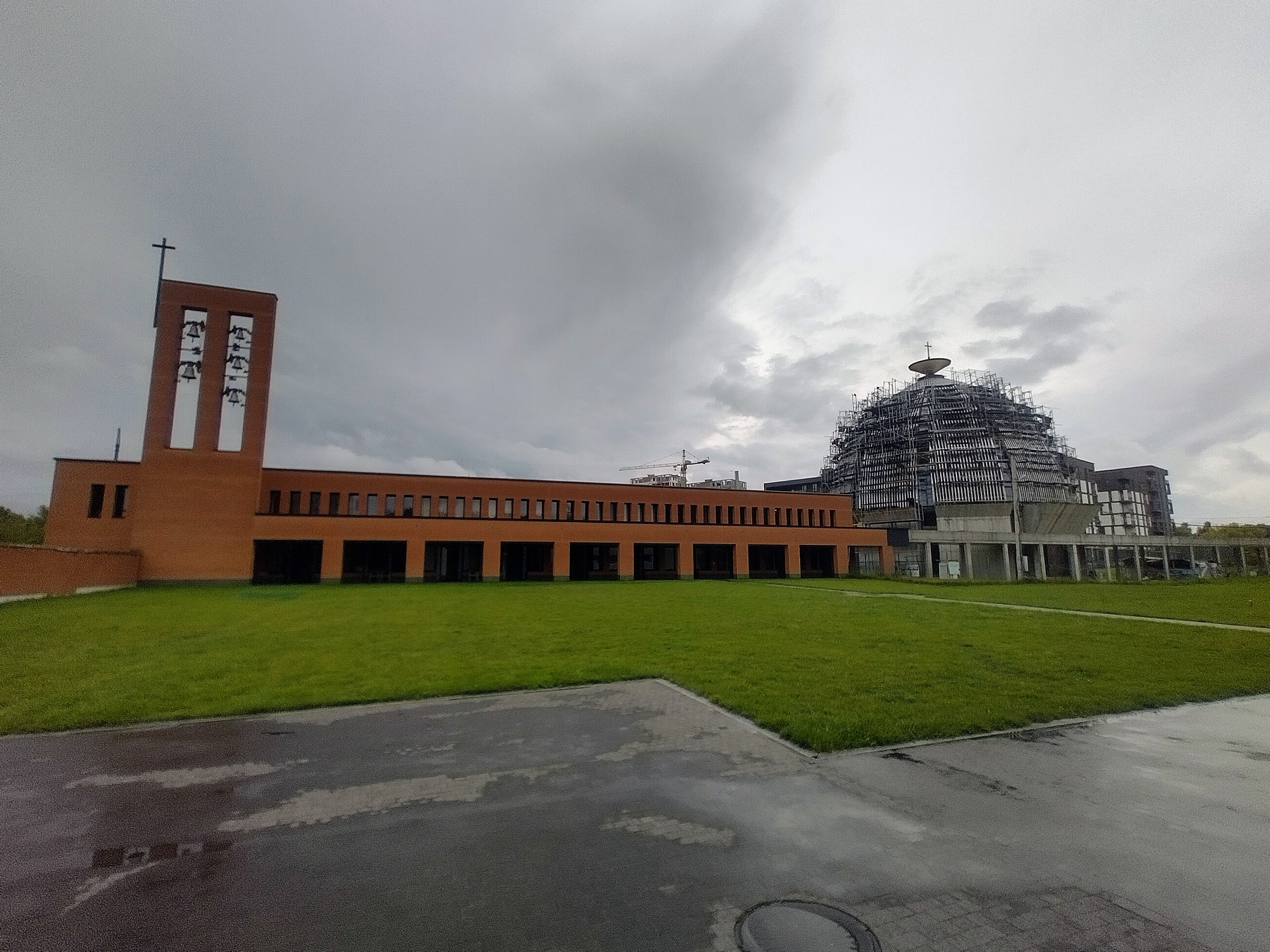
Monastery of the Orionists Fathers in Lviv (by Mario Botta and arch bureau "Symmetry", 2012-today)

== Vernacular architecture ==
The term vernacular architecture can be used interchangeably with the terms "folk", "common", "native", "traditional" and is usually placed at the other end of the spectrum from professionally designed building by architects. The building knowledge in vernacular architecture is based on local traditions and is thus based largely upon knowledge handed down through the generations. Different regions in Ukraine had their own distinctive style of vernacular architecture. For example, in the Carpathian Mountains and the surrounding foothills, wood and clay are the primary traditional building materials.

In Ukraine the most notable examples of vernacular architecture are made of wood and are best represented by religious objects such as churches and belfries. According to Ukrainian tradition, a belltower would normally be constructed as a separate building from a church; only in regions such as Boyko and Lemko lands, as well as territories bordering Russia, those two types of buildings would be traditionally combined under one roof.

The Museum of Folk Architecture and Way of Life of Central Dnieper Ukraine is located in Pereiaslav. The open-air museum contains 13 theme museums, 122 examples of national architecture, and over 30,000 historical cultural objects. The Museum of Decorative Finishes is one of the featured museums that preserves the handiwork of decorative architectural applications in Ukrainian architecture.

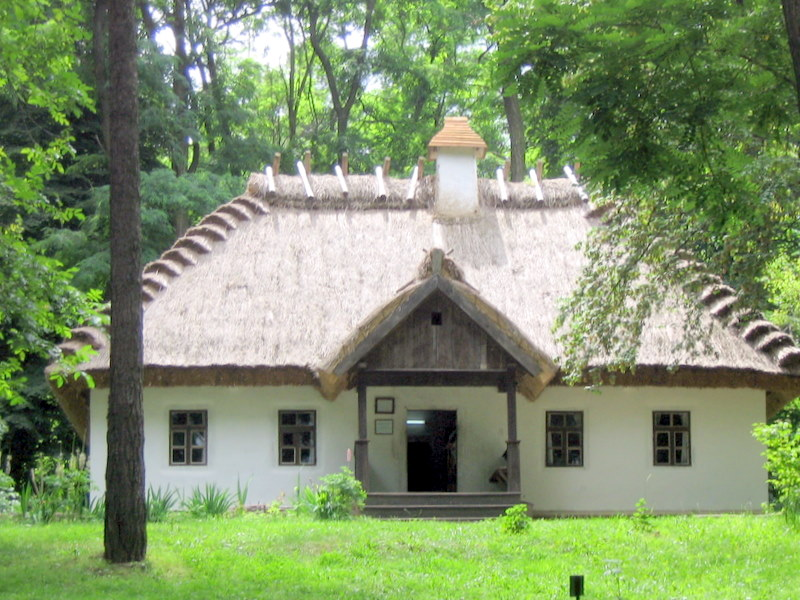
Taras's hut at Taras Hill

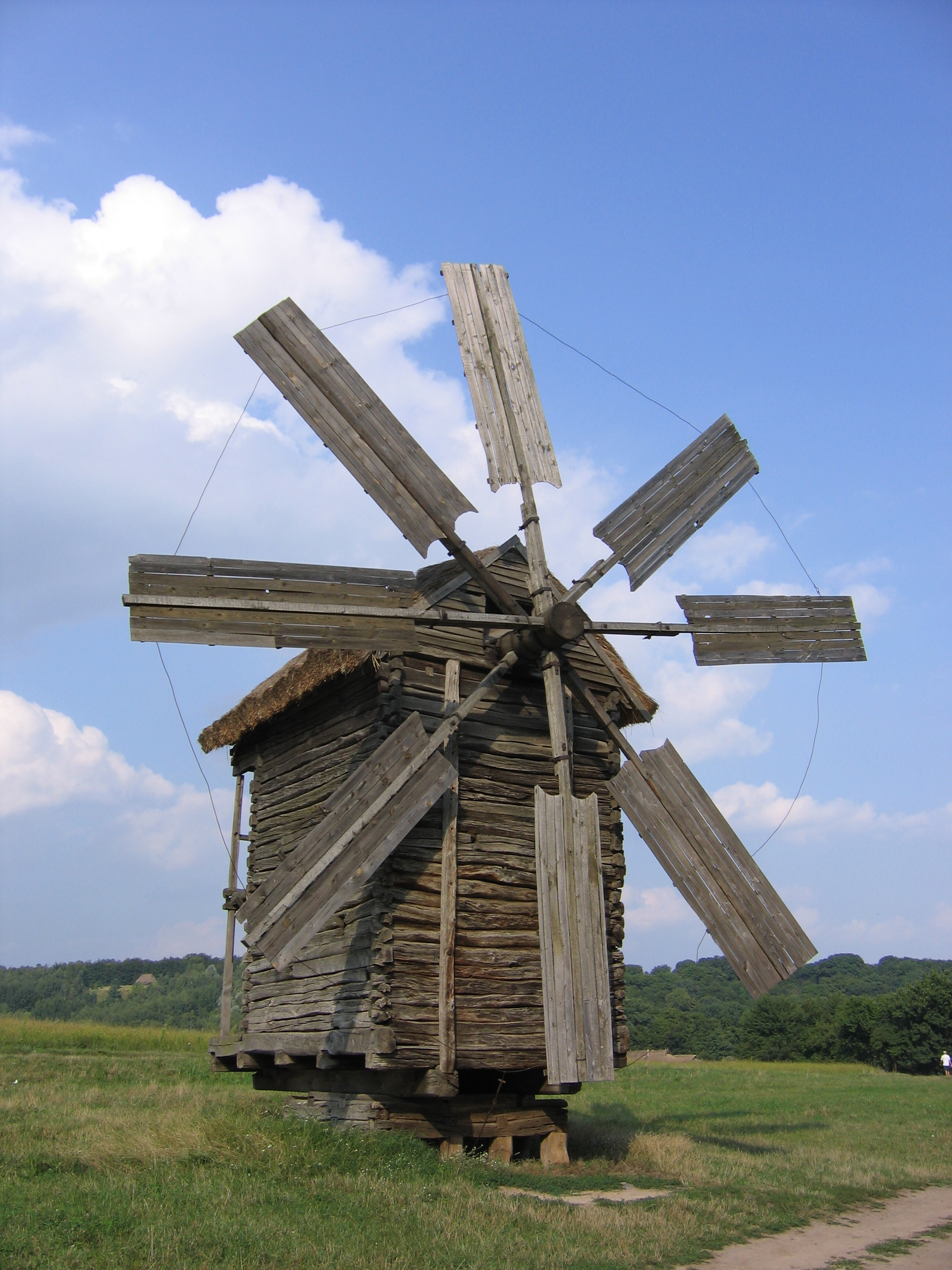
Windmill

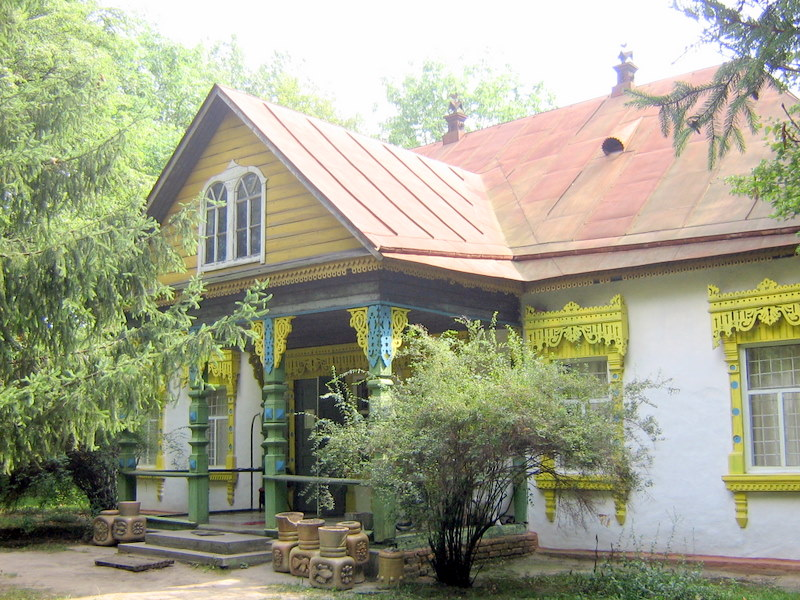
Museum of Decorative Finishes in Pereiaslav

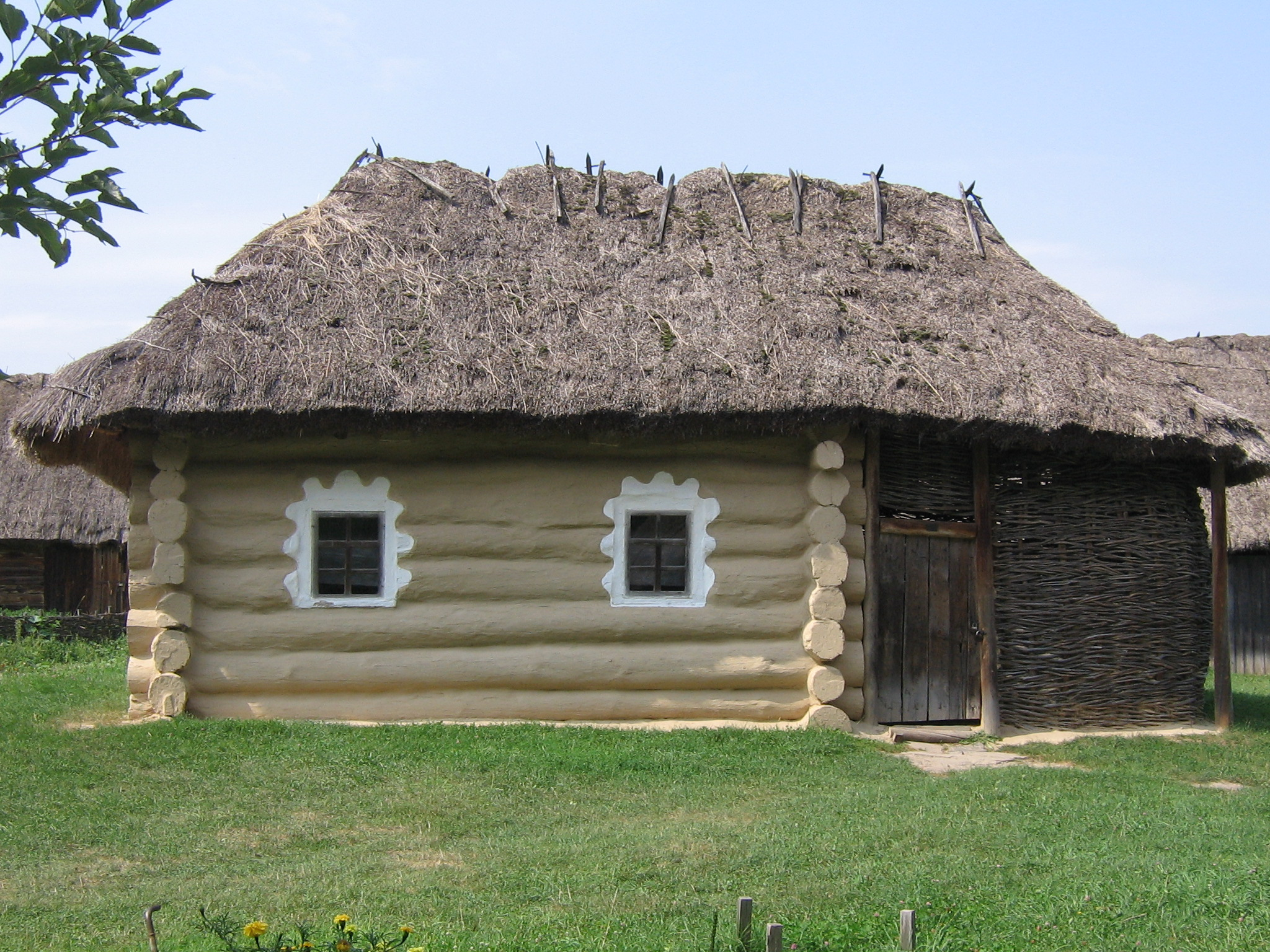
Log cabin

== Crimean Tatar architecture ==
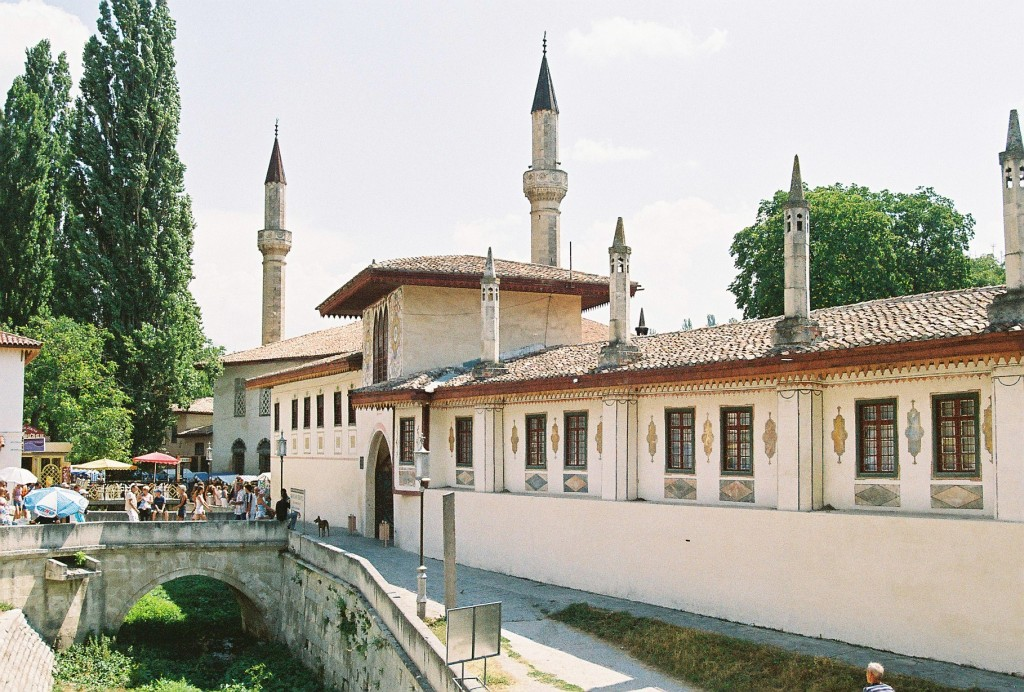
Bakhchysarai Palace (16th century)

When Crimea was ruled by the Crimean Khanate, the period left several constructions inspired by Islamic motifs. The most famous was the Bakhchysarai Palace, designed by a combined effort of Persian, Turkish, and Italian architects. Other monuments from this period include various mosques and dürbes.

== Jewish architecture ==
Prominent historic Jewish synagogues have been preserved in a number of Ukrainian towns, such as Sharhorod, Sataniv and Zhovkva. Construction of these synagogues has common elements with local Ukrainian architectural style.

== See also ==
- List of UNESCO World Heritage Sites in Ukraine
- List of historic reserves in Ukraine
- List of castles in Ukraine
- Seven Wonders of Ukraine

== Sources ==
- Aseev, Y. S.; Kharlamov, V. O. (2001). "9. Kievan Rus'". In B. E., Paton (ed.). 9.12. Архітектура: дерев'яна і кам'яна [9.12. Architecture: wooden and stone]. Історія української культури (in Ukrainian). Vol. 1. Kyiv, Ukraine: National Academy of Sciences of Ukraine. pp. 835–884. ISBN 966-00-0542-3.
- Hewryk, Titus D. (1982). "The Monastery Of St. Michael Of The Golden Domes". The Lost Architecture of Kiev. New York: The Ukrainian Museum. ASIN B0006E9KPQ. Archived from the original on 12 January 2018.
- Kubijovyč, Volodymyr M., ed. (1949). "Архітектура" [Architecture]. Енциклопедія українознавства [Encyclopedia of Ukrainian Studies]. General Part (in Ukrainian). Vol. 3. Munich, Germany; New York: Shevchenko Scientific Society in Europe. pp. 801–820.
