= Hydropark =

Hydropark is a type of park, located in the coastal zone, with the water parks. Known in several cities in Ukraine.

- Hydropark in Kyiv - the island and the park in Kyiv
- Hydropark in Kherson - the park in Kherson
- Luzanivka Hydropark - the park in Odesa, in Luzanivka quarter
- Topilche Hydropark - the park in Ternopil
- Zhytomyr Hydropark - the park in Zhytomyr

== Other uses ==
- Hydropark (Kyiv Metro), a metro station in Kyiv, located in Hydropark
- Hydropark Arena, a stadium in Hydropark in Kyiv
