= 2018 EMF EURO =

Tournament details
- Host country: Ukraine
- Dates: 12–18 August
- Teams: 20
- Venue: 1 (in 1 host city)

Final positions
- Champions: Czech Republic (1st title)
- Runners-up: Romania
- Third place: Kazakhstan
- Fourth place: England

Tournament statistics
- Matches played: 48
- Goals scored: 185 (3.85 per match)
- Top scorer: (Czech Republic) Ondřej Paděra (6)
- Best player: (Romania) Robert Dragan Paulevici
- Best goalkeeper: (Czech Republic) Ondřej Bíro

The 2018 EMF Euro was the ninth edition of the EMF miniEURO for national Small-sided football teams, and the fifth governed by the European Minifootball Federation. It took place in Kyiv, Ukraine, from 12 to 18 August 2018.

The final tournament included 20 teams.

== Draw ==
The final tournament draw was held in Ukrainian football federation headquarters in Kyiv on 11 May 2018.

== Group stage ==
Key to colours in group tables
Team advanced to the knockout stage

=== Group A ===
Team	Pld	W	D	L	GF	GA	GD	Pts
Ukraine	4	3	0	1	14	7	+7	9
Montenegro	4	3	0	1	8	6	+2	9
Italy	4	2	1	1	12	10	+2	7
Slovakia	4	1	1	2	8	9	−1	4
Belgium	4	0	0	4	4	14	−10	0

12 August 2018
15:00

Slovakia	4–1	Belgium
Tomas Dyacovsky 18', 37'; Pavol Gere 25'; Filip Bednár 28'	Report	34' Jonathan Monfroy

Hydropark, Kyiv
12 August 2018
19:00

Ukraine	3–6	Italy
Oleksii Dragan 4'; Yevhenii Shaidiuk 30'; Yevhenii Zaiets 39'	Report	8' Alessio Trovato; 9' Diogo Da Silva Teixeira; 14' Alessandro Gallinica; 23' Pedro De Aguilar Vidoto; 29' Riccardo Lorenzo Berti; 32' Daniel Stiven Zannoni

Hydropark, Kyiv
Referee: Oliver Žilić (Bosnia and Herzegovina)
Bahador Girakhoo (Austria)
Jaroslav Pakosta (Czech Republic)

13 August 2018
18:00

Italy	0–2	Montenegro
	Report	11' Mirko Klikovac; 15' Nikola Pavković

Hydropark, Kyiv
Referee: Jaroslav Pakosta (Czech Republic)
Kamil Kohout (Czech Republic)
Aleksandar Kostadinov (Bulgaria)
13 August 2018
19:00

Ukraine	3–1	Slovakia
Yevhenii Zaiets 10'; Yevhenii Shaidiuk 17'; Mykola Kodatskyi 22'	Report	36' Silvester Jáger

Hydropark, Kyiv

14 August 2018
18:00

Montenegro	3–0	Belgium
Zoran Kovac 22'; Mirko Klikovac 38', 39'	Report

Hydropark, Kyiv
14 August 2018
19:00

Slovakia	2–2	Italy
Tomas Dyacovsky 32'; Pavol Gere 37'	Report	22', 27' Angelo Creaco

Hydropark, Kyiv
Referee: Srdjan Stevanović (Serbia)
Bahador Girakhoo (Austria)
Cezar Ionescu (Romania)

15 August 2018
19:00

Montenegro	3–1	Slovakia
Vladimir Bojanić 15'; Velibor Babović 19'; Vladan Popovic 30'	Report	31' Filip Bednár

Hydropark, Kyiv
Referee: Oliver Žilić (Bosnia and Herzegovina)
Aleksandar Kostadinov (Bulgaria)
Cezar Ionescu (Romania)
15 August 2018
20:00

Belgium	0–3	Ukraine
	Report	13' Yevhenii Shaidiuk; 23' Viktor Panteleichuk; 37' Kostiantyn Ivankevych

Hydropark, Kyiv
Referee: Nicolae Chis-Ciure (Romania)
Cezar Ionescu (Romania)
Oliver Žilić (Bosnia and Herzegovina)

16 August 2018
16:00

Belgium	3–4	Italy
Terry Caudron 2'; Bruno Scordino 37'; Thiry Amaury 41'	Report	6' Pedro De Aguilar Vidoto; 18', 20' Riccardo Lorenzo Berti; 31' Diogo Da Silva Teixeira

Hydropark, Kyiv
Referee: Jaroslav Pakosta (Czech Republic)
Kamil Kohout (Czech Republic)
Srdjan Stevanović (Serbia)
16 August 2018
19:00

Ukraine	5–0	Montenegro
Anatolii Kytsiuta 6'; Ivan Kryvosheienko 20', 32'; Yevhenii Shaidiuk 25', 26'	Report

Hydropark, Kyiv
Referee: Nicolae Chis-Ciure (Romania)
Rudolf Csirke (Hungary)
Oliver Žilić (Bosnia and Herzegovina)

=== Group B ===
Team	Pld	W	D	L	GF	GA	GD	Pts
Romania	4	4	0	0	9	2	+7	12
England	4	2	1	1	10	7	+3	7
Spain	4	2	1	1	8	5	+3	7
Israel	4	1	0	3	4	8	−4	3
Austria	4	0	0	4	4	13	−9	0

12 August 2018
20:00

Spain	2–2	England
Pablo Machancoses 24'; Vicente Zaragoza 33'	Report	15' Luke Griffin; 28' Bilal Butt

Hydropark, Kyiv
12 August 2018
21:00

Romania	2–0	Austria
Mircea Ioan Popa 3'; Petrisor Sebastian Vasile 30'	Report

Hydropark, Kyiv

13 August 2018
21:00

England	2–4	Romania
Bilal Butt 35'; Luke Griffin 40'	Report	5' Petrisor Sebastian Vasile; 10' Andrei Ionut Nemitanu; 24' Dumitru Razvan Radu; 26' Dumitru Florin Stelea

Hydropark, Kyiv
Referee: Vadym Tendera (Ukraine)
Goran Arcon (Montenegro)
Imre Czinder (Hungary)
13 August 2018
22:00

Spain	1–0	Israel
Xavier Moré 35'	Report

Hydropark, Kyiv
Referee: Imre Czinder (Hungary)
Oliver Žilić (Bosnia and Herzegovina)
Tomas Goga (Slovakia)

14 August 2018
21:00

Romania	2–0	Israel
Robert Dragan Paulevici 13'; Amit Sharabi 18' (o.g.)	Report

Hydropark, Kyiv
Referee: Aleksandar Kostadinov (Bulgaria)
Oliver Žilić (Bosnia and Herzegovina)
Jaroslav Pakosta (Czech Republic)
14 August 2018
22:00

England	2–1	Austria
Luke Griffin 36'; George Isaac 36'	Report	19' Sead Ismajli

Hydropark, Kyiv

15 August 2018
17:00

Spain	5–2	Austria
Jaime Ferrer 18'; Carlos Bosch 20'; Miguel Pérez 31'; Vicente Zaragoza 33'; Xavier Moré 34'	Report	10' Hamza Mikara; 31' Sead Ismajli

Hydropark, Kyiv
Referee: Goran Arcon (Montenegro)
Rudolf Csirke (Hungary)
Vadym Tendera (Ukraine)
15 August 2018
21:00

England	4–0	Israel
James McCluskey 19'; Luke Griffin 28'; Bilal Butt 29'; Ross Cable 41'	Report

Hydropark, Kyiv
Referee: Goran Arcon (Montenegro)
Imre Czinder (Hungary)
Kamil Kohout (Czech Republic)

16 August 2018
21:00

Romania	1–0	Spain
Petrisor Sebastian Vasile 25'	Report

Hydropark, Kyiv
Referee: Angelo Corce (Italy)
Goran Arcon (Montenegro)
Nemanja Ljumovic (Montenegro)
16 August 2018
22:00

Austria	1–4	Israel
Sead Ismajli 21'	Report	22', 28' Yehonatan Zeharia; 33' (pen.) Sharon Adani; 40' Netanel Fkadu

Hydropark, Kyiv
Referee: Nemanja Ljumovic (Montenegro)
Vadym Tendera (Ukraine)
Oliver Žilić (Bosnia and Herzegovina)

=== Group C ===
Team	Pld	W	D	L	GF	GA	GD	Pts
Bosnia and Herzegovina	4	3	1	0	9	4	+5	10
Kazakhstan	4	2	2	0	6	2	+4	8
Bulgaria	4	2	1	1	9	4	+5	7
Albania	4	1	0	3	4	10	−6	3
Ireland	4	0	0	4	3	11	−8	0

12 August 2018
13:00

Kazakhstan	1–0	Albania
Nurzhan Abdrassilov 8'	Report

Hydropark, Kyiv
12 August 2018
14:00

Bosnia and Herzegovina	3–1	Ireland
Andreas Berović 23'; Borislav Grbavac 34'; Mladen Čećura 39'	Report	36' Emir Mustic

Hydropark, Kyiv
Referee: Nicolae Chis-Ciure (Romania)
Cezar Ionescu (Romania)
Jaroslav Pakosta (Czech Republic)

13 August 2018
15:00

Bulgaria	3–2	Ireland
Dimitar Aleksandrov 8'; Veselin Filipov 21'; Dobrin Mihaylov 22'	Report	37' Mahmoud Giumaa; 40' Emir Mustic

Hydropark, Kyiv
13 August 2018
17:00

Albania	2–4	Bosnia and Herzegovina
Fatmir Hysenbelliu 13'; Eugen Shima 18'	Report	1', 31', 32' Goran Lovrinović; 26' Kristijan Pantić

Hydropark, Kyiv
Referee: Nicolae Chis-Ciure (Romania)
Cezar Ionescu (Romania)
Jaroslav Pakosta (Czech Republic)

14 August 2018
15:00

Ireland	0–3	Kazakhstan
	Report	7', 29' Didar Sydykbek; 33' Nurzhan Abdrassilov

Hydropark, Kyiv
14 August 2018
17:00

Bosnia and Herzegovina	1–0	Bulgaria
Kristijan Pantić 10'	Report

Hydropark, Kyiv
Referee: Angelo Corce (Italy)
Tomas Goga (Slovakia)
Imre Czinder (Hungary)

15 August 2018
14:00

Albania	2–0	Ireland
Rigers Dushku 4'; Eugen Shima 20'	Report

Hydropark, Kyiv
15 August 2018
16:00

Kazakhstan	1–1	Bulgaria
Didar Sydykbek 36'	Report	39' (o.g.) Dastan Darabayev

Hydropark, Kyiv
Referee: Srdjan Stevanović (Serbia)
Jaroslav Pakosta (Czech Republic)
Goran Arcon (Montenegro)

16 August 2018
15:00

Bulgaria	5–0	Albania
Nikolay Todorov 1'; Nikolay Petrov 15'; Svеtlozar Tabakov 25'; Dimitar Aleksandrov 27'; Veselin Filipov 30'	Report

Hydropark, Kyiv
Referee: Imre Czinder (Hungary)
Rudolf Csirke (Hungary)
Jaroslav Pakosta (Czech Republic)
16 August 2018
17:00

Bosnia and Herzegovina	1–1	Kazakhstan
Marko Vujica 41'	Report	24' Nurbek Karagulov

Hydropark, Kyiv
Referee: Srdjan Stevanović (Serbia)
Vadym Tendera (Ukraine)
Cezar Ionescu (Romania)

=== Group D ===
Team	Pld	W	D	L	GF	GA	GD	Pts
Serbia	4	3	1	0	9	3	+6	10
Czech Republic	4	2	2	0	12	7	+5	8
Hungary	4	2	1	1	9	5	+4	7
Azerbaijan	4	1	0	3	8	7	+1	3
Turkey	4	0	0	4	8	24	−16	0

12 August 2018
16:00

Czech Republic	7–3	Turkey
Patrik Levčík 15'; Jiří Sodoma 17'; František Hakl 27'; Jan Koudelka 27'; Jakub Polák 28'; Ondřej Paděra 35', 36'	Report	25' (o.g.) Patrik Levčík; 34', 37' Oğuzhan Aksoy

Hydropark, Kyiv
12 August 2018
17:00

Hungary	1–0	Azerbaijan
Ferenc Béres 27'	Report

Hydropark, Kyiv

13 August 2018
16:00

Serbia	5–1	Turkey
Ivan Štokić 13', 24'; Čedomir Tomčić 16', 39'; Stefan Radovanović 32'	Report	25' Alper Şen

Hydropark, Kyiv
Referee: Angelo Corce (Italy)
Tomas Goga (Slovakia)
Nicolae Chis-Ciure (Romania)
13 August 2018
20:00

Azerbaijan	1–2	Czech Republic
Seymur Mammadov 10'	Report	38' Jakub Göth; 41' František Hakl

Hydropark, Kyiv
Referee: Cezar Ionescu (Romania)
Bahador Girakhoo (Austria)
Vadym Tendera (Ukraine)

14 August 2018
16:00

Turkey	2–6	Hungary
Serhat Genç 32'; Berkan Alkaya 38'	Report	10' Zsolt Horváth; 12' Dániel Kiprich; 23' Ferenc Béres; 25' Richárd Rábold; 27', 32' István Soltész

Hydropark, Kyiv
14 August 2018
20:00

Czech Republic	1–1	Serbia
Patrik Levčík 2'	Report	3' Čedomir Tomčić

Hydropark, Kyiv
Referee: Cezar Ionescu (Romania)
Nicolae Chis-Ciure (Romania)
Oliver Žilić (Bosnia and Herzegovina)

15 August 2018
15:00

Azerbaijan	6–2	Turkey
Asif Zeynalov 1'; Seymur Mammadov 17', 18', 31'; Vusal Isayev 38'; Elvin Alizada 40'	Report	18', 27' Kaan Çamkır

Hydropark, Kyiv
Referee: Nemanja Ljumovic (Montenegro)
Tomas Goga (Slovakia)
Srdjan Stevanović (Serbia)
15 August 2018
18:00

Hungary	0–1	Serbia
	Report	14' Ivan Štokić

Hydropark, Kyiv
Referee: Angelo Corce (Italy)
Vadym Tendera (Ukraine)
Oliver Žilić (Bosnia and Herzegovina)

16 August 2018
18:00

Serbia	2–1	Azerbaijan
Nebojša Desnica 5'; Stefan Radovanović 9'	Report	39' Asif Zeynalov

Hydropark, Kyiv
Referee: Cezar Ionescu (Romania)
Tomas Goga (Slovakia)
Nemanja Ljumovic (Montenegro)
16 August 2018
20:00

Czech Republic	2–2	Hungary
Robin Demeter 31', 40'	Report	14' Zsolt Szabó; 33' Miklós Rajz

Hydropark, Kyiv
Referee: Aleksandar Kostadinov (Bulgaria)
Oliver Žilić (Bosnia and Herzegovina)
Angelo Corce (Italy)

== Knockout stage ==
=== Bracket ===
Quarter-finals
17 August, 19:00
Ukraine	1 (1)
England	1 (3)
17 August, 20:15
Bosnia and Herzegovina	1
Czech Republic	3
17 August, 17:45
Romania	2
Montenegro	0
17 August, 21:30
Serbia	1
Kazakhstan	2

Semi-finals
18 August, 13:00
England	0
Czech Republic	5
18 August, 14:15
Romania	2 (3)
Kazakhstan	2 (1)

Final
18 August, 21:00
Czech Republic	4
Romania	1
Third place
18 August, 19:30
Kazakhstan	2
England	0

=== Quarter-finals ===
17 August 2018
17:45

Romania	2–0	Montenegro
Zoran Kovac 9' (o.g.); Saron Ionut Chirica 33' (pen.)	Report

Hydropark, Kyiv
Referee: Tomas Goga (Slovakia)
Vadym Tendera (Ukraine)
Aleksandar Kostadinov (Bulgaria)
17 August 2018
19:00

Ukraine	1–1	England
Viktor Aranovskiy 22'	Report	8' Daniel Julienne
Penalties
Yevhenii Shaidiuk (penalty missed); Ivan Kryvosheienko (penalty scored)	1–3	(penalty scored) Ross Cable; (penalty scored) James McCluskey; (penalty scored) Bilal Butt

Hydropark, Kyiv
Referee: Srdjan Stevanović (Serbia)
Oliver Žilić (Bosnia and Herzegovina)
Nemanja Ljumovic (Montenegro)
17 August 2018
20:15

Bosnia and Herzegovina	1–3	Czech Republic
Goran Lovrinović 20' (pen.)	Report	9' Patrik Levčík; 20' Jakub Göth; 21' Jakub Polák

Hydropark, Kyiv
Referee: Aleksandar Kostadinov (Bulgaria)
Angelo Corce (Italy)
Rudolf Csirke (Hungary)
17 August 2018
21:00

Serbia	1–2	Kazakhstan
Stefan Radovanović 20'	Report	20' Nurbek Karagulov; 32' Dastan Darabayev

Hydropark, Kyiv
Referee: Nicolae Chis-Ciure (Romania)
Angelo Corce (italy)
Jaroslav Pakosta (Czech Republic)

=== Semi-finals ===
18 August 2018
13:00

England	0–5	Czech Republic
	Report	12', 34' Ondřej Paděra; 14' Jiří Sodoma; 17' Robin Demeter; 20' Jakub Polák

Hydropark, Kyiv
18 August 2018
14:15

Romania	2–2	Kazakhstan
Vlad Claudiu 18'; Mircea Ioan Popa 35'	Report	9' Azamat Khassenov; 40' Dastan Darabayev
Penalties
Vincene Toma (penalty scored); Andrei Ionut Nemitanu (penalty scored); Alecu Ionut Traian (penalty scored)	3–1	(penalty missed) Dastan Darabayev; (penalty scored) Nurbek Karagulov

Hydropark, Kyiv
Referee: Angelo Corce (Italy)
Goran Arcon (Montenegro)
Srdjan Stevanović (Serbia)

=== Bronze medal game ===
18 August 2018
19:30

England	0–2	Kazakhstan
	Report	19' Didar Sydykbek; 39' Yerzhan Zharlgaganov

Hydropark, Kyiv
Referee: Oliver Žilić (Bosnia and Herzegovina)
Tomas Goga (Slovakia)
Rudolf Csirke (Hungary)

=== Final ===
18 August 2018
21:30

Czech Republic	4–1	Romania
Jan Koudelka 2', 32'; Ondřej Paděra 7', 35'	Report	34' Andrei Ionut Nemitanu

Hydropark, Kyiv
Referee: Aleksandar Kostadinov (Bulgaria)
Nemanja Ljumovic (Montenegro)
Srdjan Stevanović (Serbia)

== Final ranking ==
Pos	Team	Pld	W	D	L	GF	GA	GD	Pts	Result
1	Czech Republic	7	5	2	0	24	9	+15	17	1st
2	Romania	7	6	0	1	14	8	+6	18	2nd
3	Kazakhstan	7	4	2	1	12	5	+7	14	3rd
4	England	7	3	1	3	11	15	−4	10	4th
5	Serbia	5	3	1	1	10	5	+5	10	Eliminated in the quarter-finals
6	Bosnia and Herzegovina	5	3	1	1	10	7	+3	10	Eliminated in the quarter-finals
7	Ukraine	5	3	0	2	15	8	+7	9	Eliminated in the quarter-finals
8	Montenegro	5	3	0	2	8	8	0	9	Eliminated in the quarter-finals
9	Bulgaria	4	2	1	1	9	4	+5	7	Eliminated in the group stage
10	Hungary	4	2	1	1	9	5	+4	7	Eliminated in the group stage
11	Spain	4	2	1	1	8	5	+3	7	Eliminated in the group stage
12	Italy	4	2	1	1	12	10	+2	7	Eliminated in the group stage
13	Slovakia	4	1	1	2	8	9	−1	4	Eliminated in the group stage
14	Azerbaijan	4	1	0	3	8	7	+1	3	Eliminated in the group stage
15	Israel	4	1	0	3	4	8	−4	3	Eliminated in the group stage
16	Albania	4	1	0	3	4	10	−6	3	Eliminated in the group stage
17	Ireland	4	0	0	4	3	11	−8	0	Eliminated in the group stage
18	Austria	4	0	0	4	4	13	−9	0	Eliminated in the group stage
19	Belgium	4	0	0	4	4	14	−10	0	Eliminated in the group stage
20	Turkey	4	0	0	4	8	24	−16	0	Eliminated in the group stage

== Goalscorers ==
There have been 185 goals scored in 48 matches, for an average of 3.85 goals per match.

1 goals
