= Caprom =

Russian architectural style

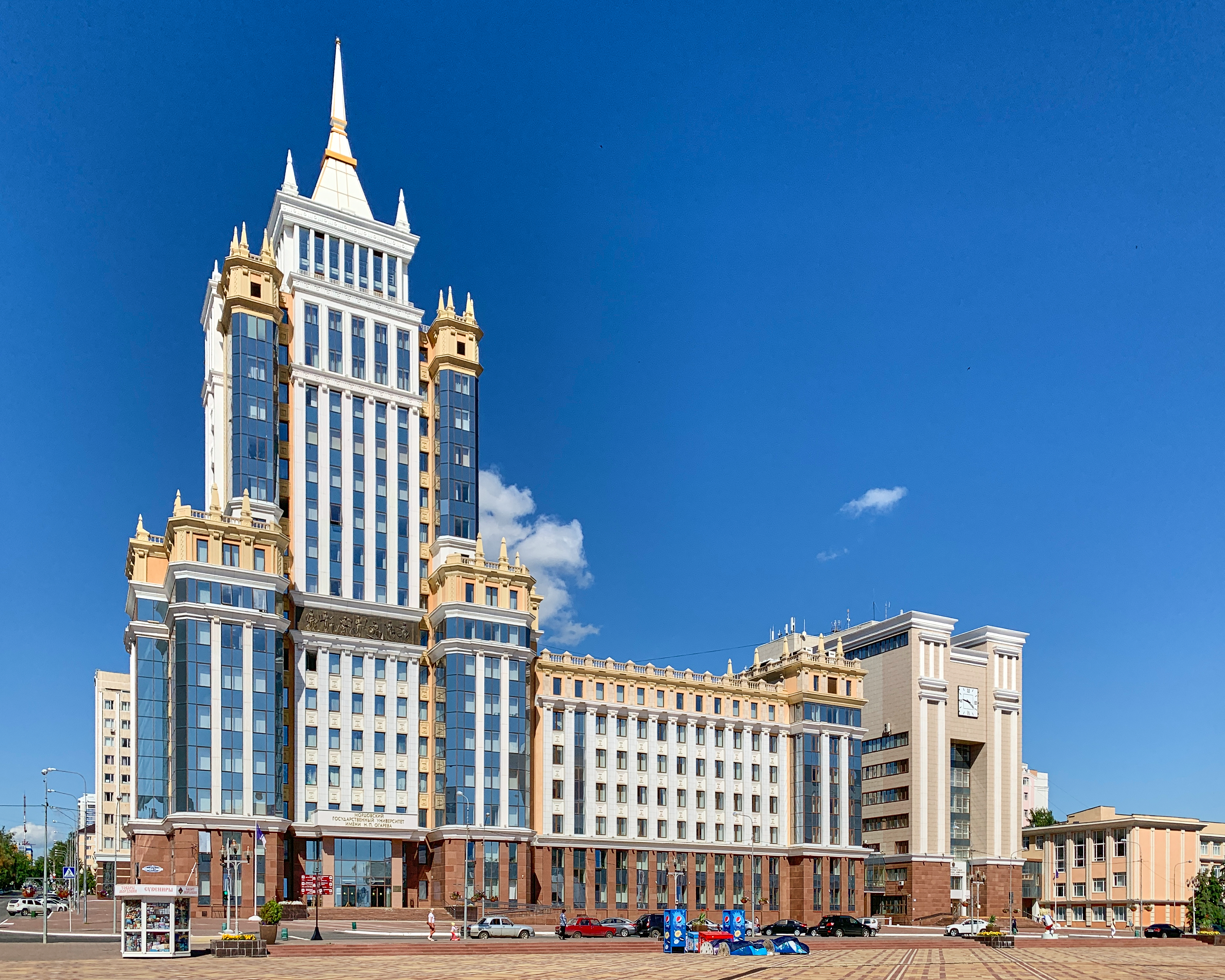
The building of Mordovian State University in Saransk, containing the elements characteristic to Stalinist, modernist and contemporary architecture

Caprom (a portmanteau of capitalist romanticism) is an architectural style, that emerged in Russia and the former USSR after the fall of the Soviet Union, that was a widespread phenomenon until 2008. It is also described as "post-Soviet postmodernism". Buildings that belong to this style often receive a negative assessment of contemporaries as "flashy and lurid".

== General definitions ==
The term "caprom" was formulated by architect Daniil Veretennikov, designer Alexander Semenov and urbanist Gavriil Malyshev. They describe it as a contextual style that developed against the backdrop of several factors after the fall of the USSR: lack of control of urban planning regulations in Russia, romanticization of pre-Soviet times, the emergence of private architectural firms, the design being determined by the free market and the tastes of new private clients.

The main feature of capitalist romanticism is the desire to express the individuality of each individual building. Malyshev called it a reaction to the strict imposition of unifying architectural norms in the USSR, distinguished by their gray tones and strict geometric forms, with buildings acting as a part of a harmonious architectural ensemble. On the contrary, caprom buildings were created as competing architectural dominants. Another distinctive feature of caprom is the low quality of materials, prone to quick deterioration. Design elements characterizing the style include classical orders, statues, arches and cornices, often placed inconsistently, combined with panoramic tinted and mirror glazing, usage of marble and granite in exterior cladding, atypical colors and forms.

The 2008 financial crisis is generally considered to be the end of the caprom era, although buildings in this architectural style continued to be built in regional cities.

=== Regional trends ===
Caprom was characterized by the development of many regional trends, some of which can be distinguished as separate branches of the style:

- In Moscow, it is common to distinguish the so-called "Luzhkov style", which developed during the period of the mayor Yury Luzhkov's rule. According to art historian Elizaveta Likhacheva, the distinctive feature of Moscow caprom is an excess of decorations from different architectural styles, "turrets, minarets, tile cladding, bright colors." Other caprom buildings imitated Stalinist style.
- In Saint Petersburg, the style of buildings was generally distinguished by greater restraint due to stricter conservation laws and active resistance from urban preservationists, however, this did not prevent a separate trend labeled "stakanism" from developing, which was characterized by an emphasis on glazing, which made possible to easily distinguish new buildings against the background of historical architecture.
- In Grozny, buildings in the style of capitalist romanticism combine elements characteristic of the style with the forms of Vainakh tower architecture.

== Reception ==
Critics categorize the style as "kitsch", having the goal of looking "first and foremost opulent", calling the buildings not only tasteless, but also immoral, as their high cost was at odds with the mass poverty of the 1990s. As although the historical context has united these buildings into a stylistic community, they lack an intellectual concept and deep semantic load. Defenders of the style appeal to its historical and anthropological value, which in their opinion, reflects the popular mood and tastes of that era and is important as an artifact of its time.

== Gallery ==
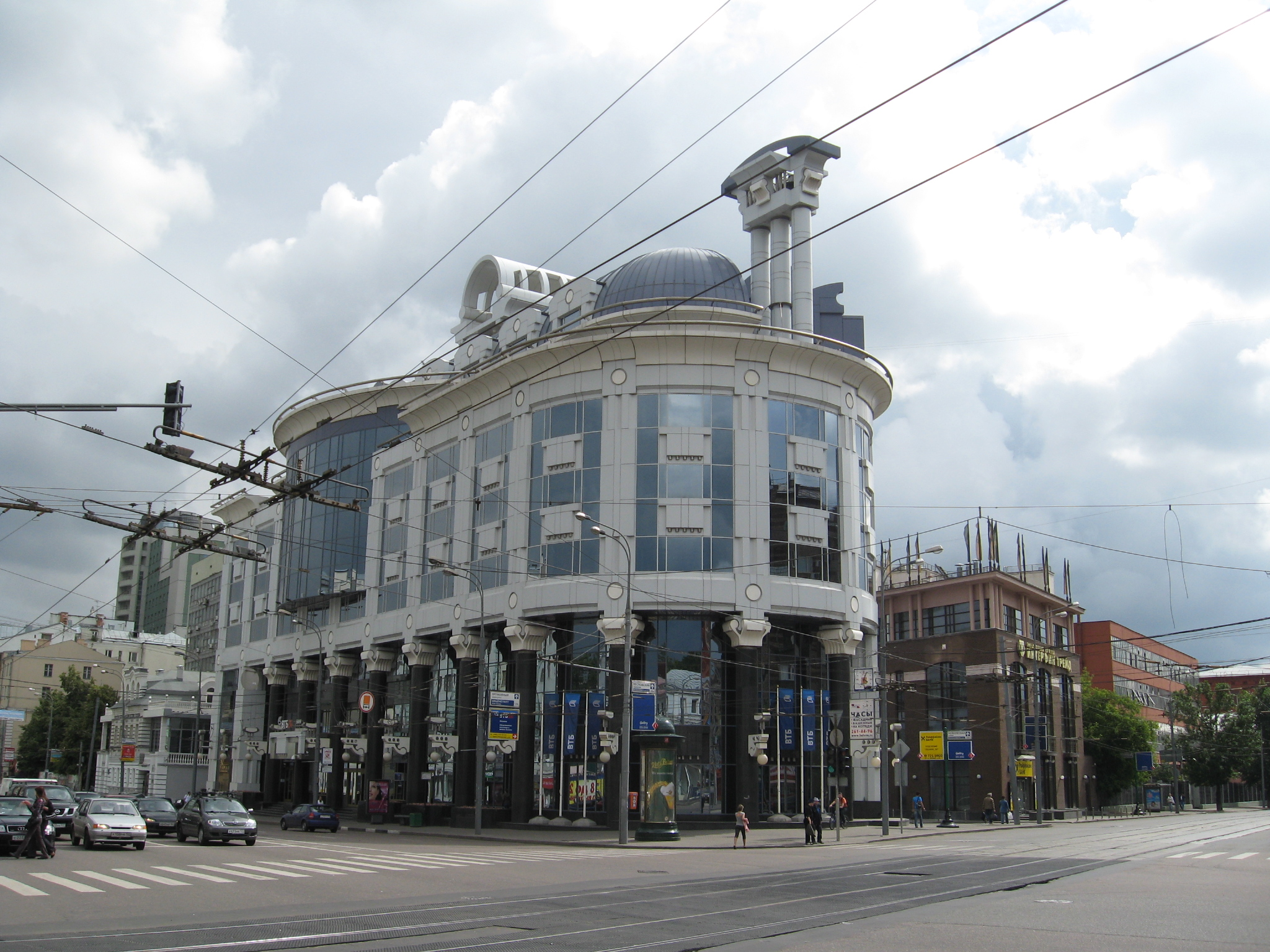
Commercial building in Moscow

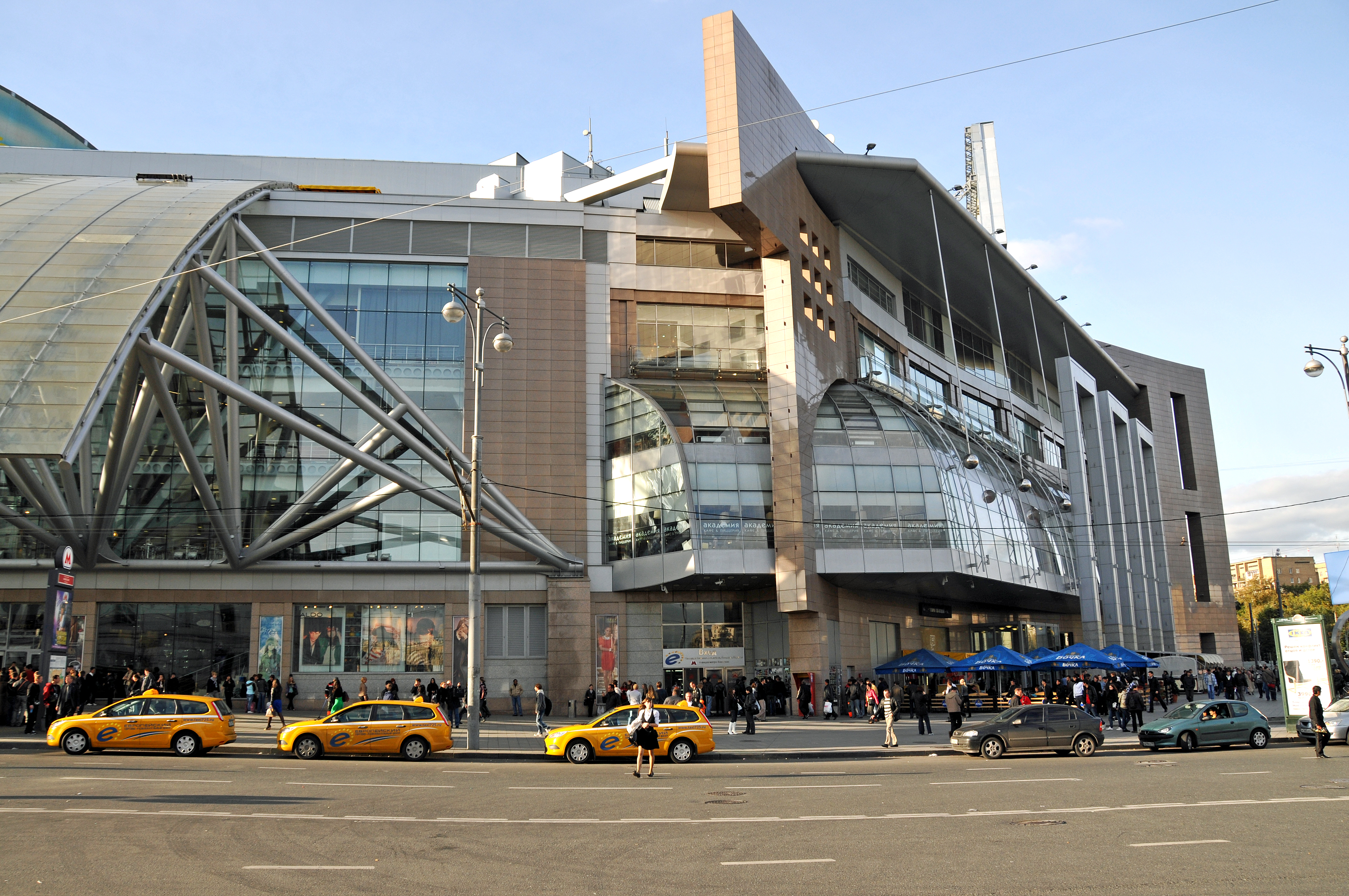
Evropeisky shopping mall, Moscow

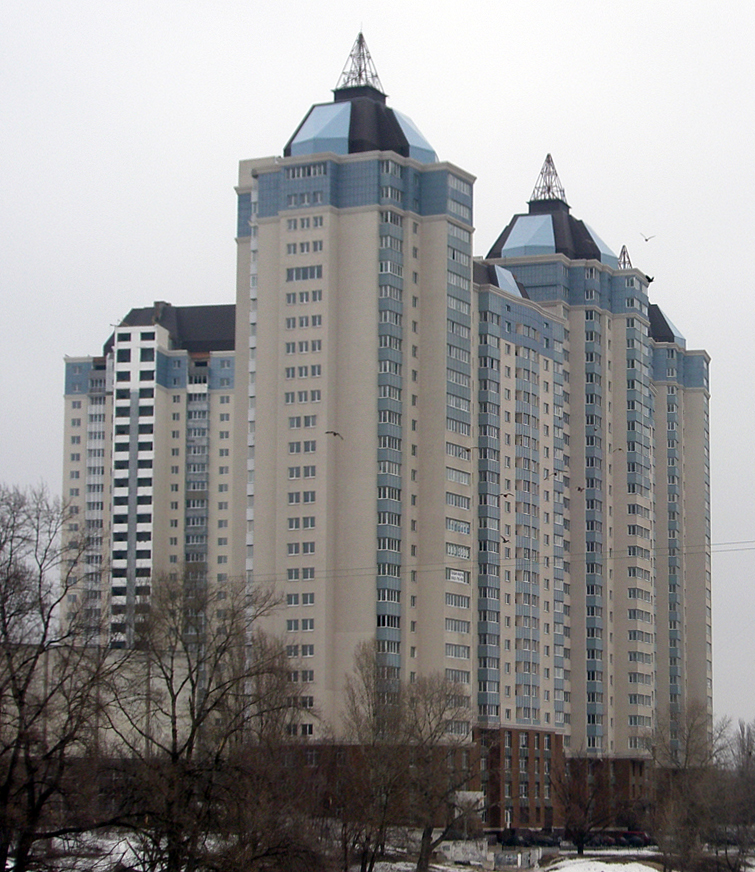
Apartment buildings in Rusanivka, Kyiv

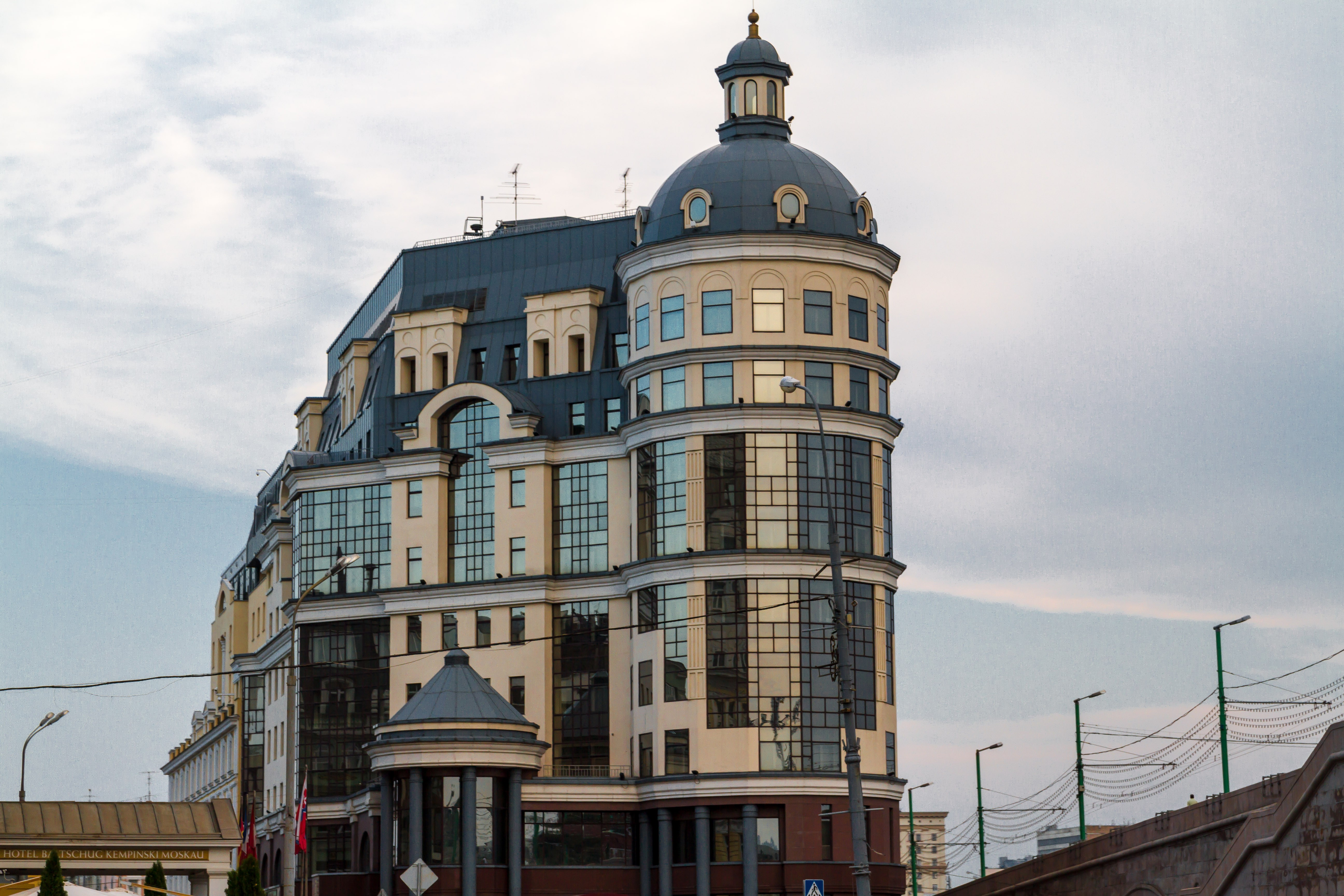
Main Directorate of the Bank of Russia for the Central Federal District, Moscow

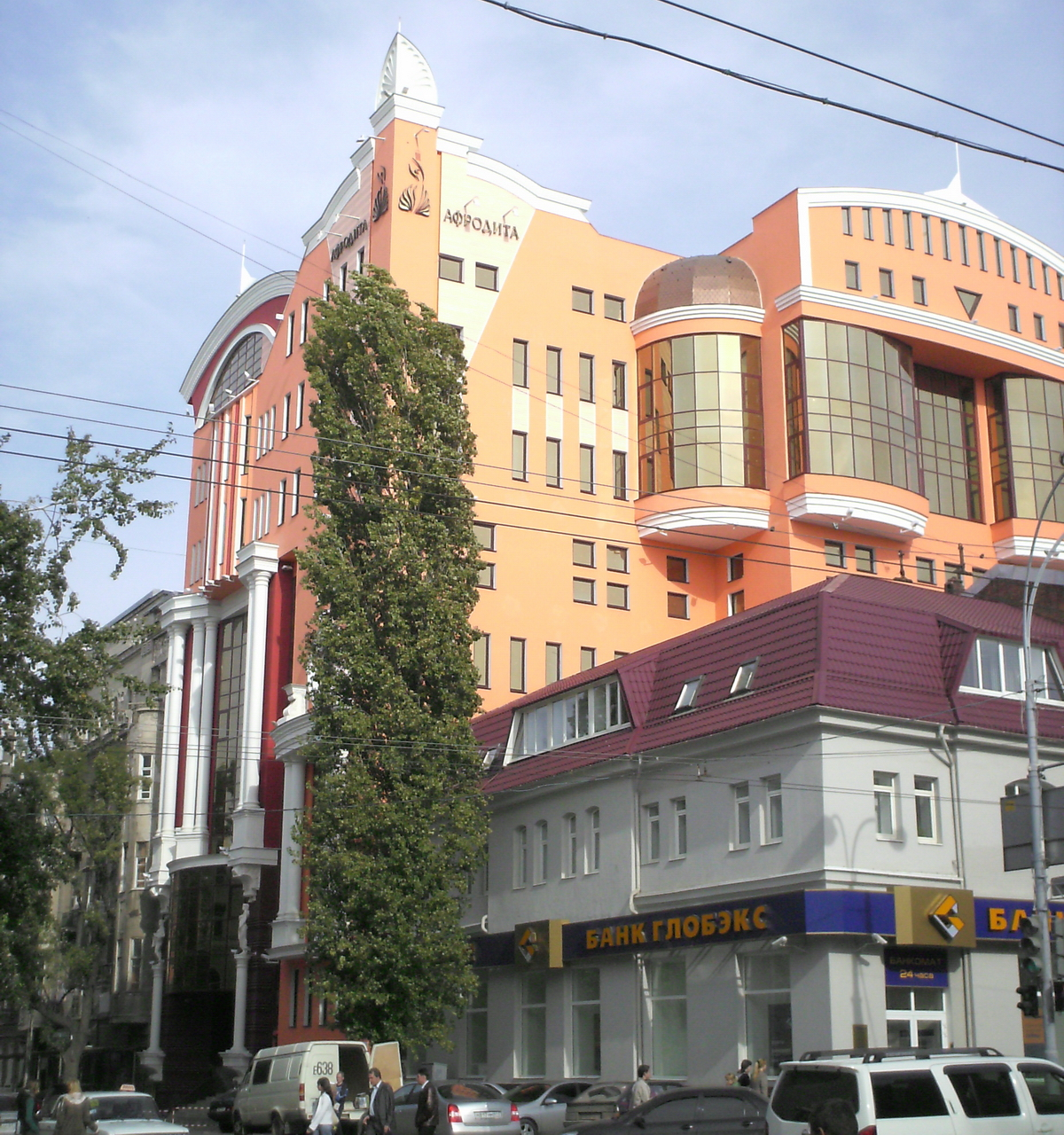
Apartment building in Rostov-on-Don

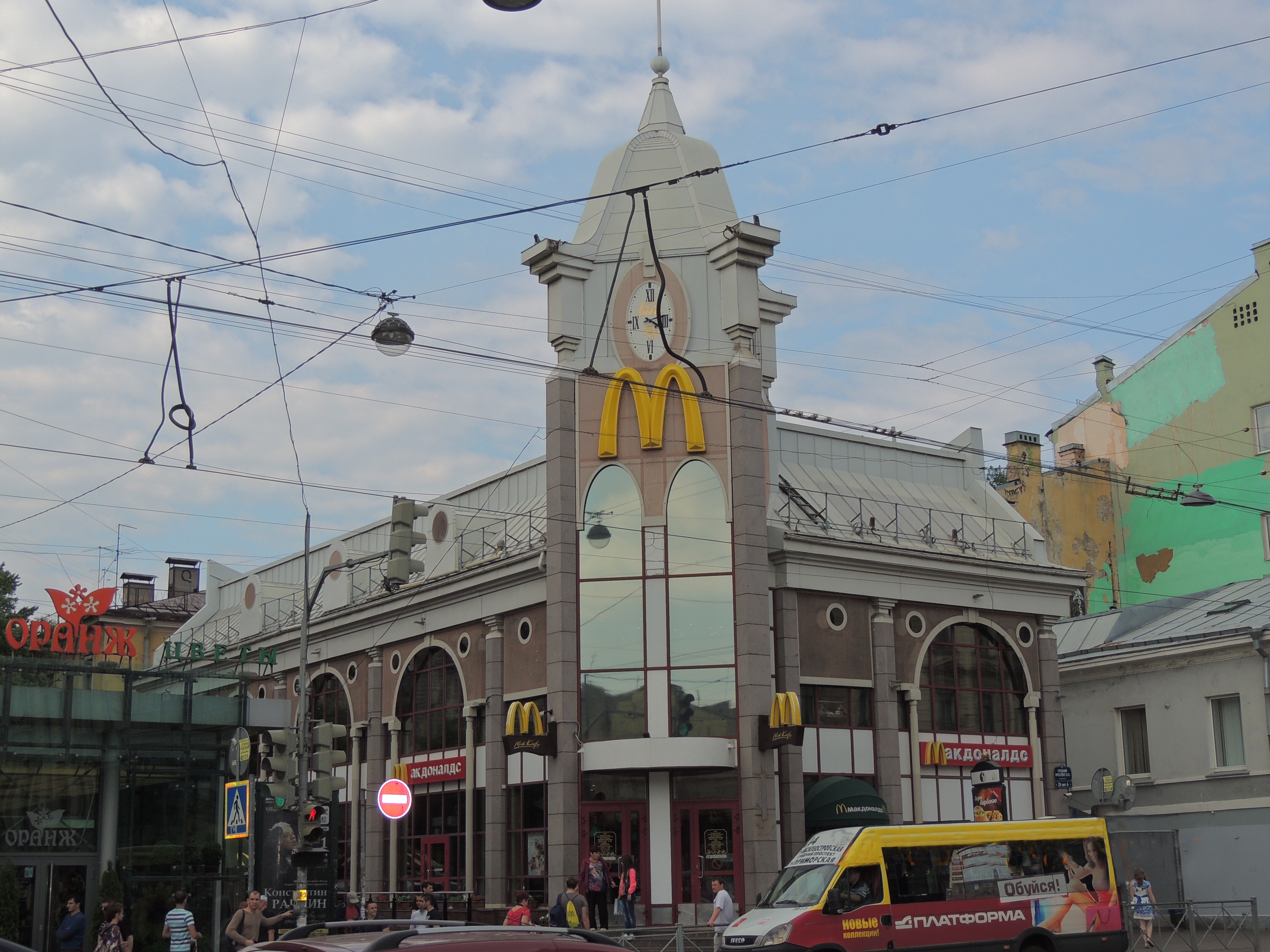
Commercial building in Saint Petersburg

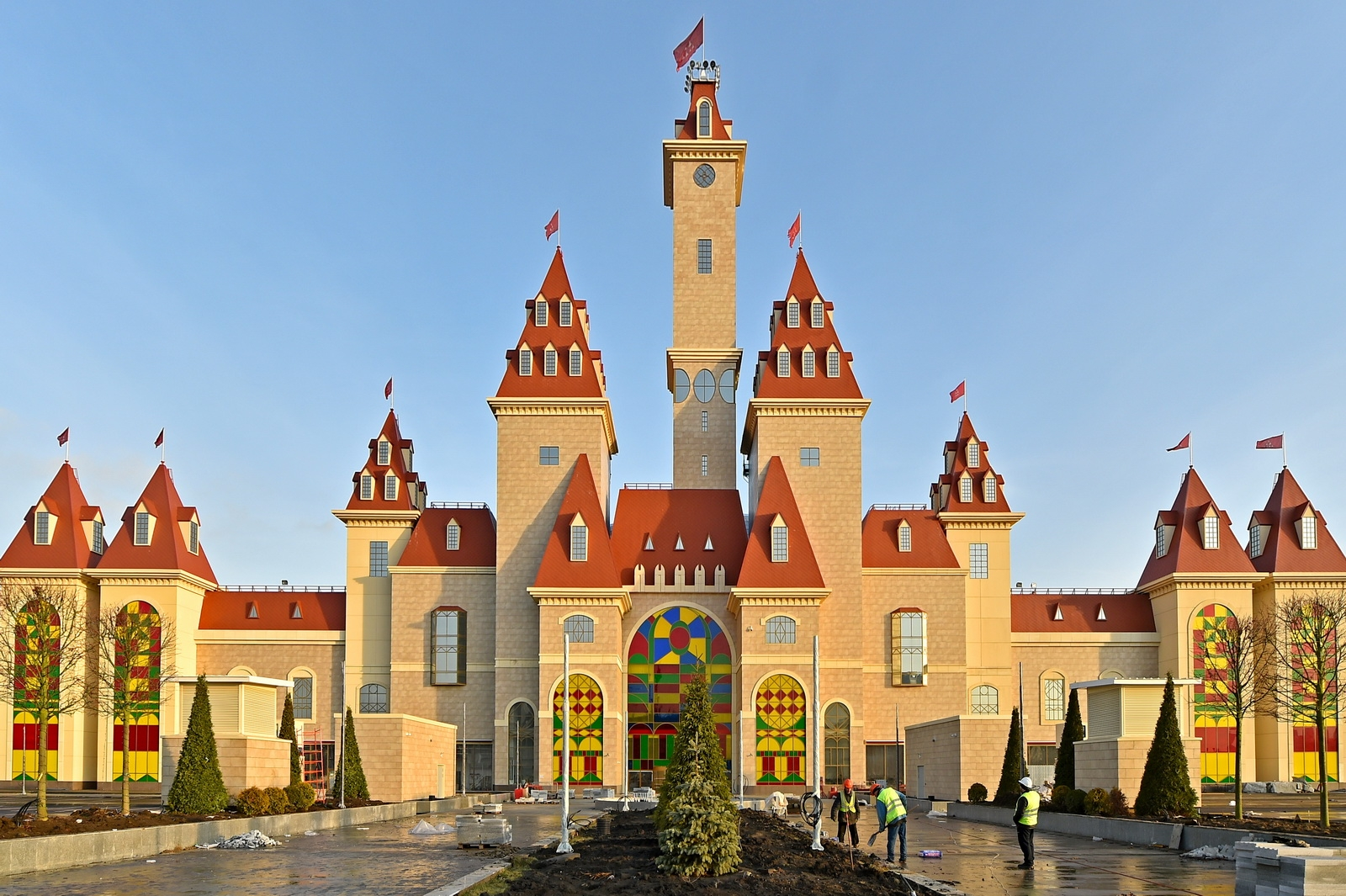
Dream Island amusement park, Moscow

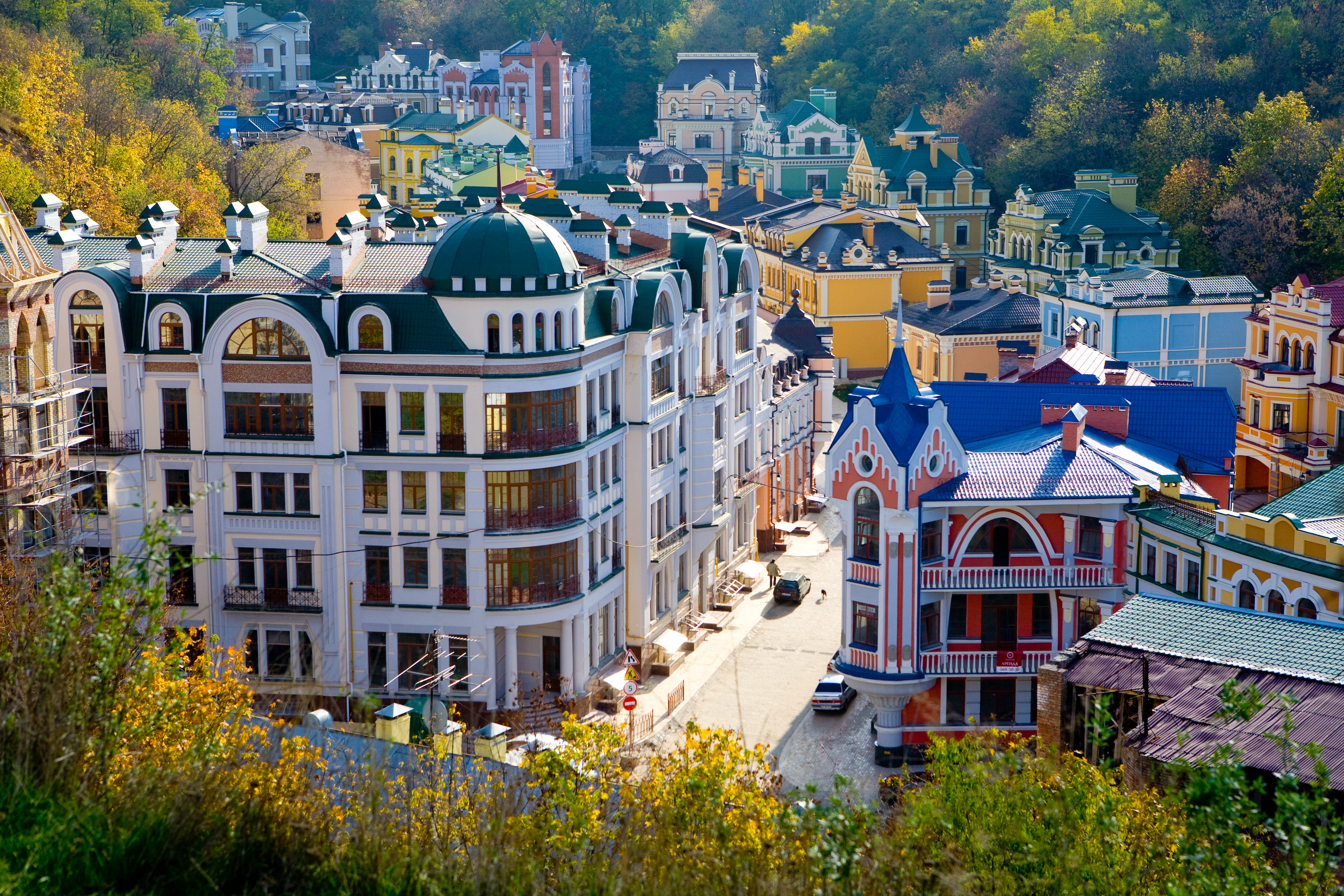
Vozdvyzhenka neighborhood, Kyiv
