= Luzanivka Hydropark =

Park in Odesa, Ukraine

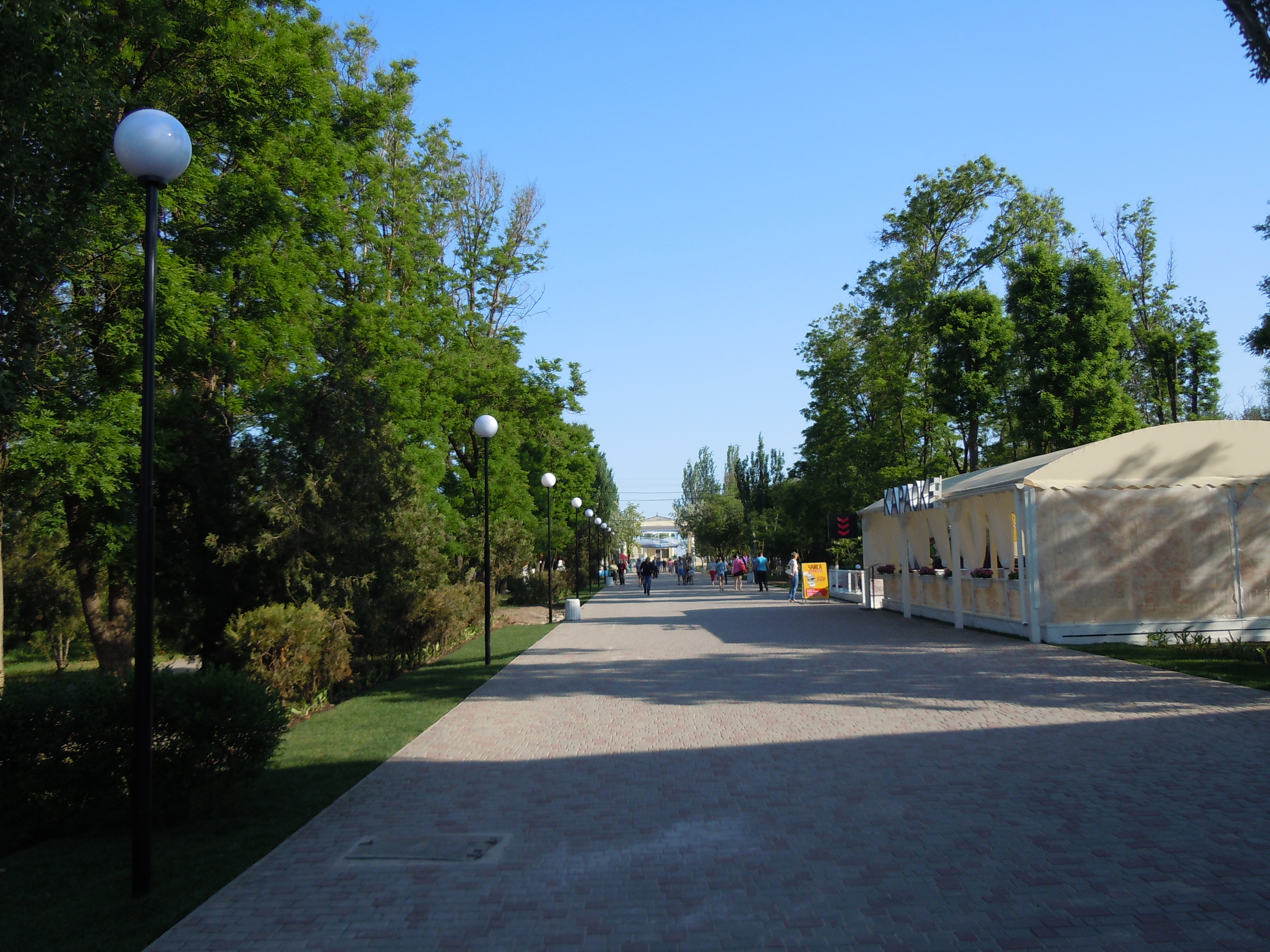
- Central avenue of the park
- Interactive map of Luzanivka Hydropark
- Type: Hydropark
- Location: Luzanivka
- Coordinates: 46°33′04″N 30°45′42″E
- Area: 168 hectares (420 acres)

Luzanivka Hydropark is a park in Odesa, Ukraine, at the coast of the Gulf of Odesa. It is located in the historical quarter Luzanivka between the Mykolaiv Road and coastal line. The park was named after Grigory Kotovsky during the Soviet period, therefore it is presented at the title Kotovsky Park on many of maps. The Luzanivka Beach is located in the park. The western part of the park is almost greeneries less.

The total reconstruction of the park was provided in 2011. The central avenue of the park was reconstructed just in 2014.

== Luzanivka Beach ==
It differs from the other beaches in Odesa in that Luzanivka Beach is naturally sandy, because it is located at the natural sandbar (separated the Kuyalnik Estuary from the Gulf of Odesa). The sea bottom is sloped, the beach is well adapted for the children resort. The land at this part is on the same level as the sea water. The beach opens to a nice view of the downtown of Odesa. Luzanivka is the cheapest place for the restoration among the beaches in Odesa. A lot of bars and nightclubs makes it a good alternative to the famous Arcadia, which is much more expensive.

== Gallery ==
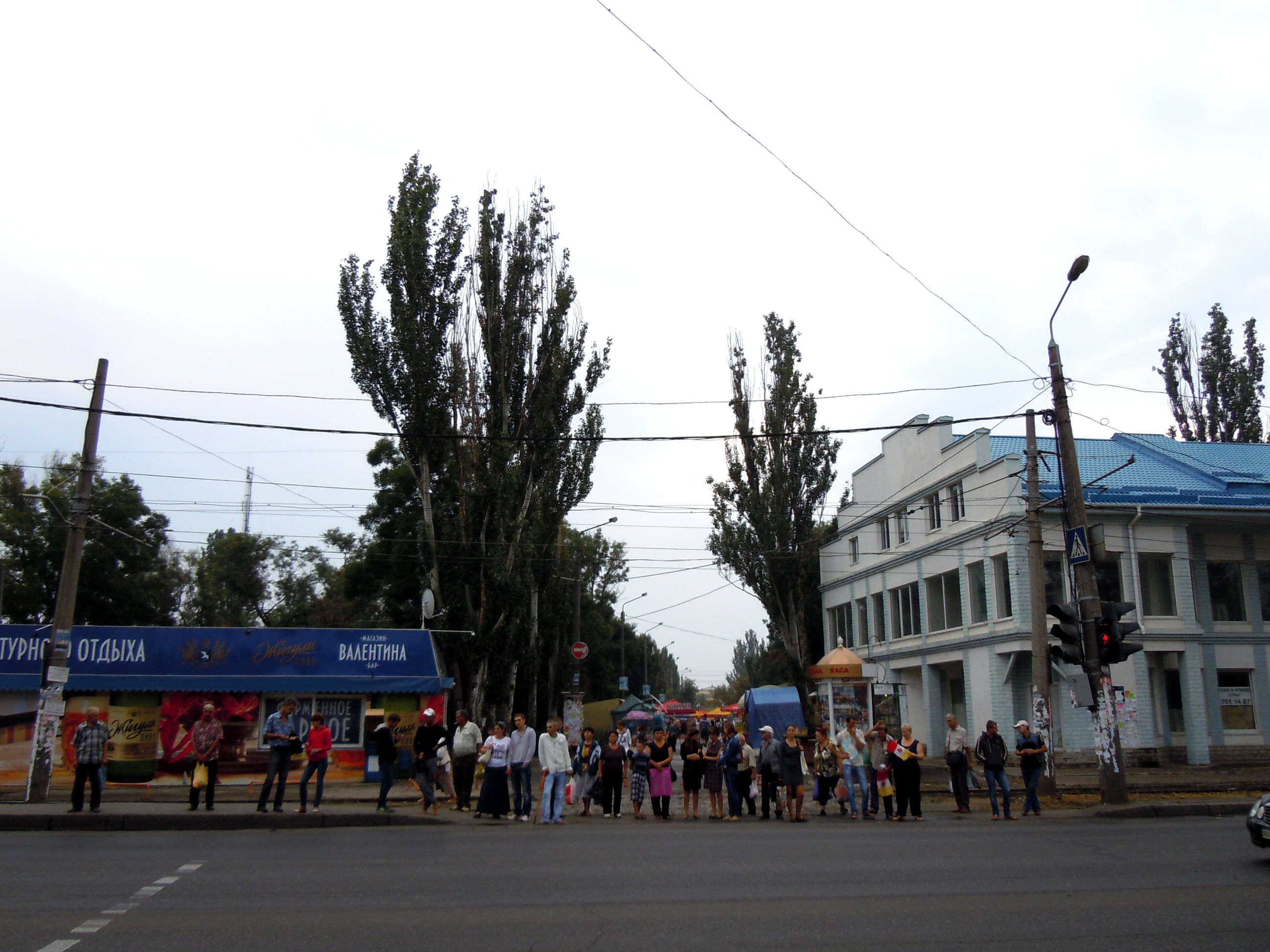
Main entrance to the park

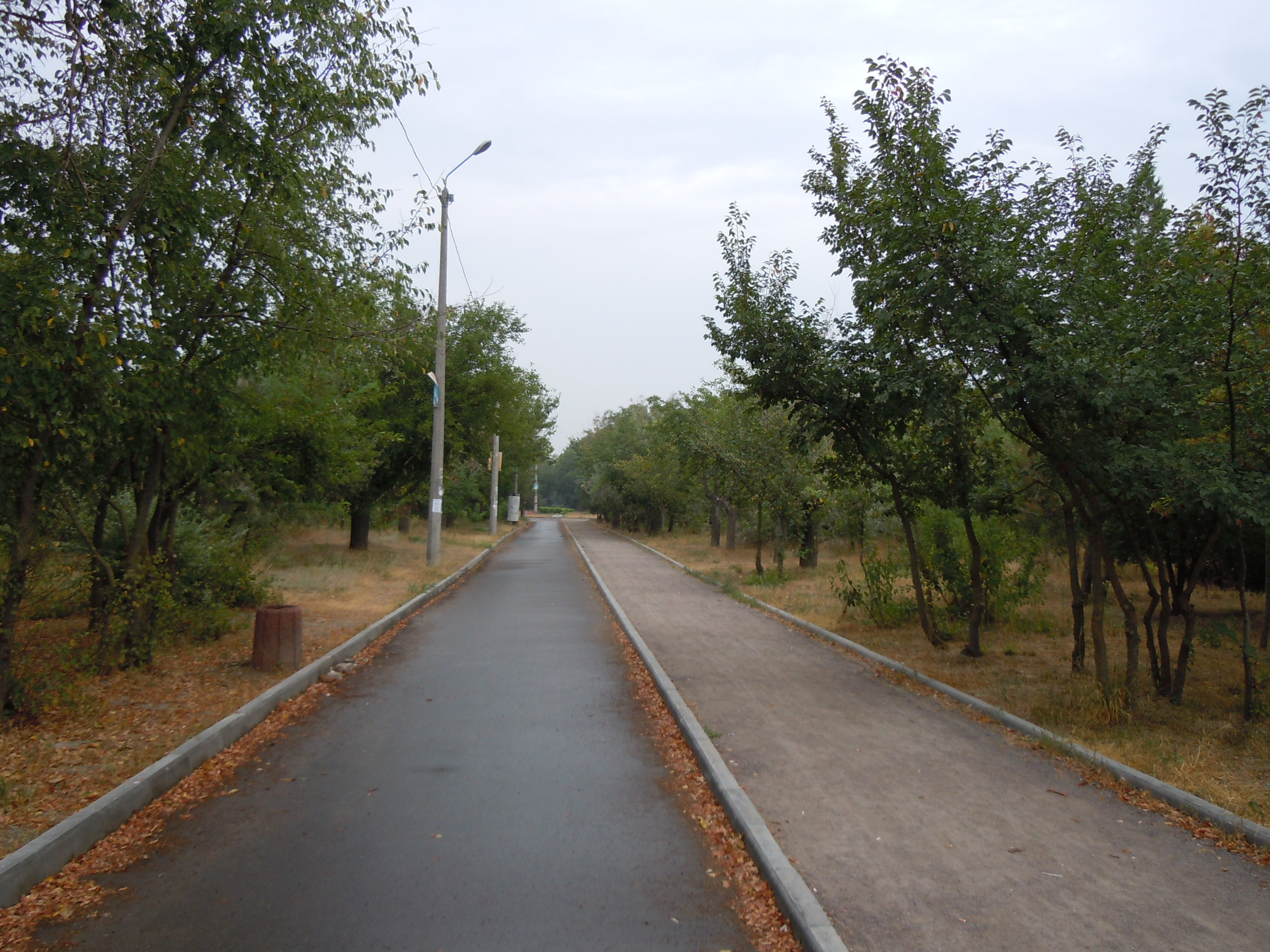
Hydropark avenues

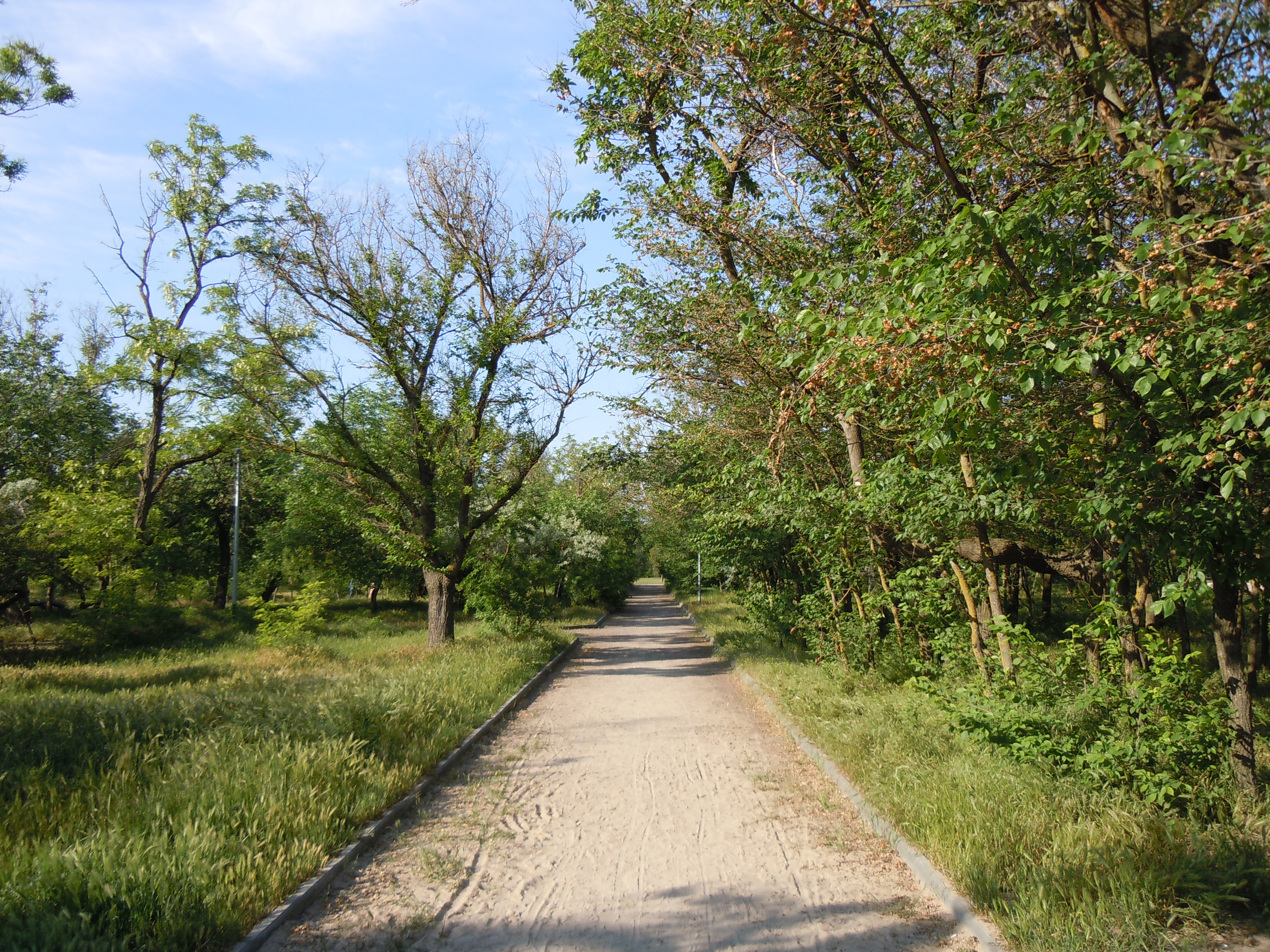
Hydropark avenues

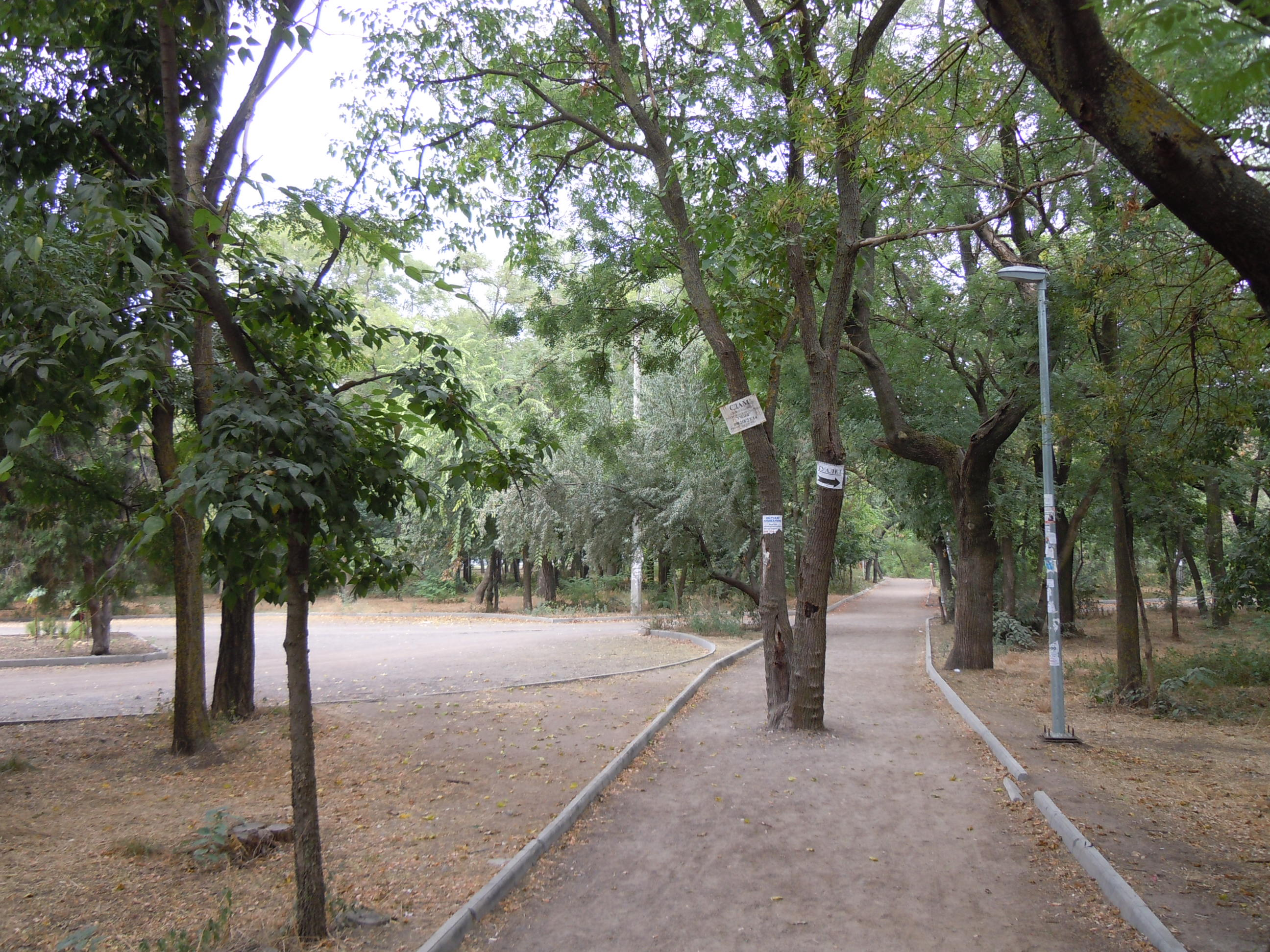
Hydropark avenues

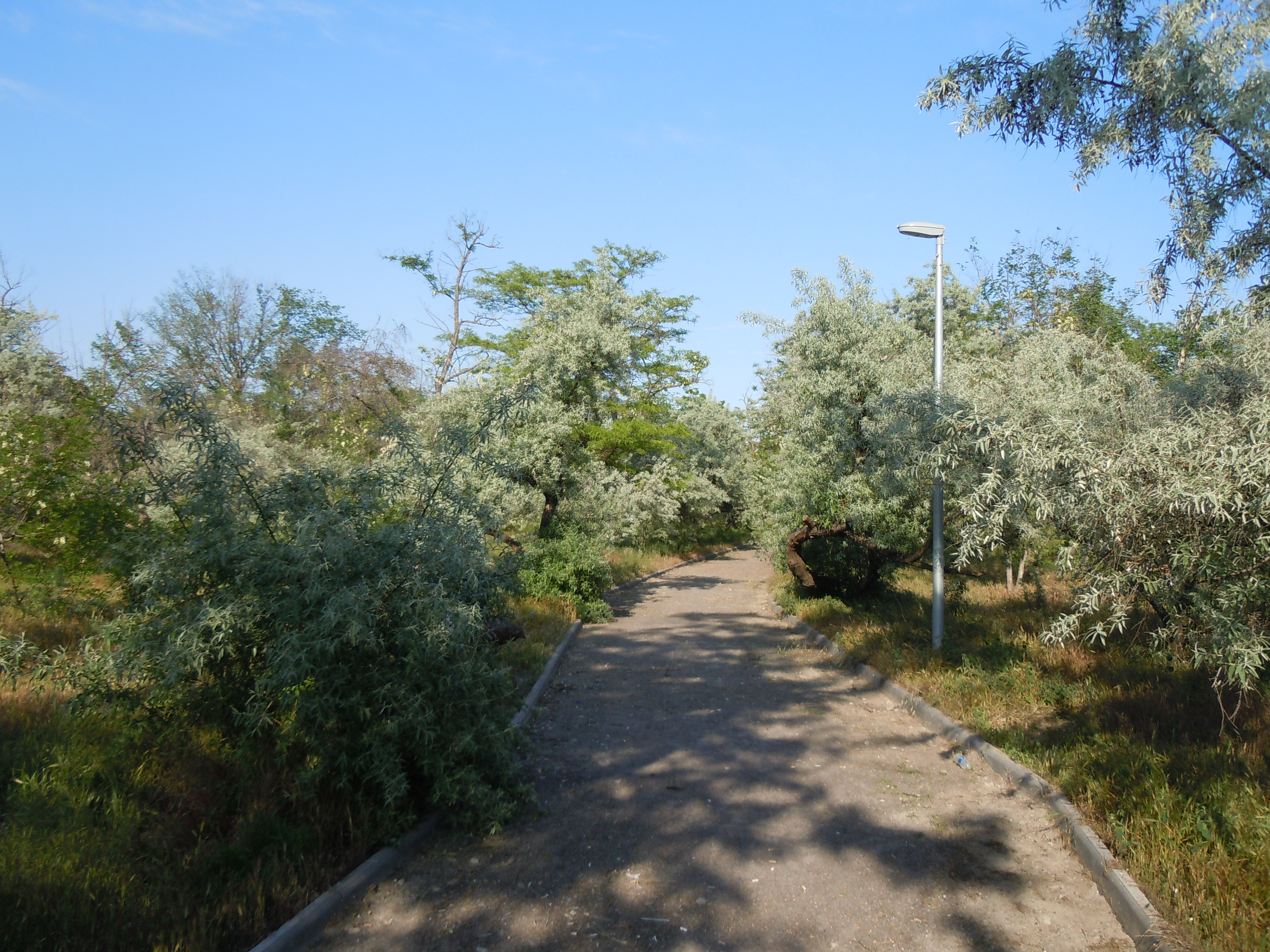
Hydropark avenues

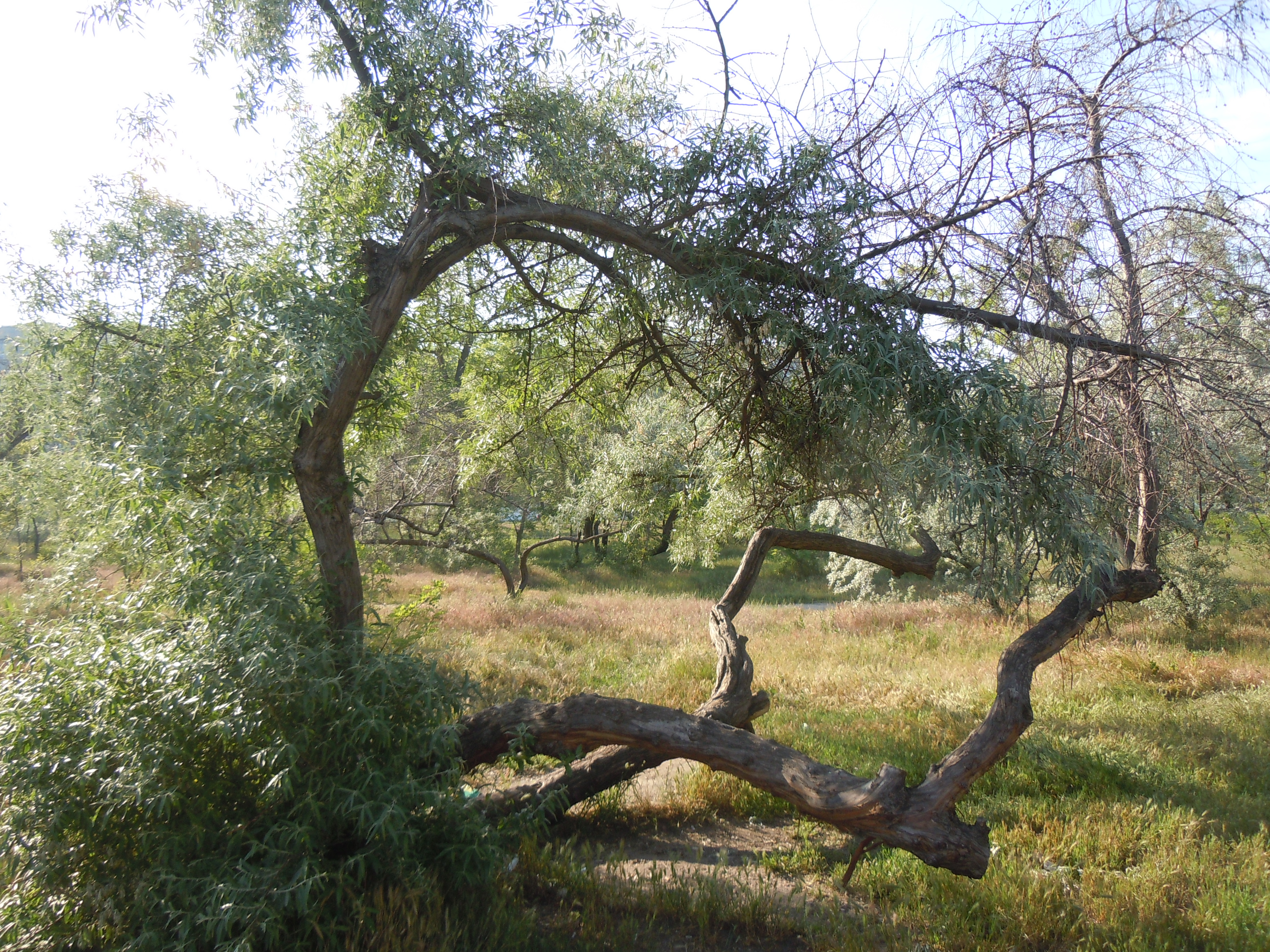
The oleaster (Elaeagnus angustifolia) is a part of the natural flora

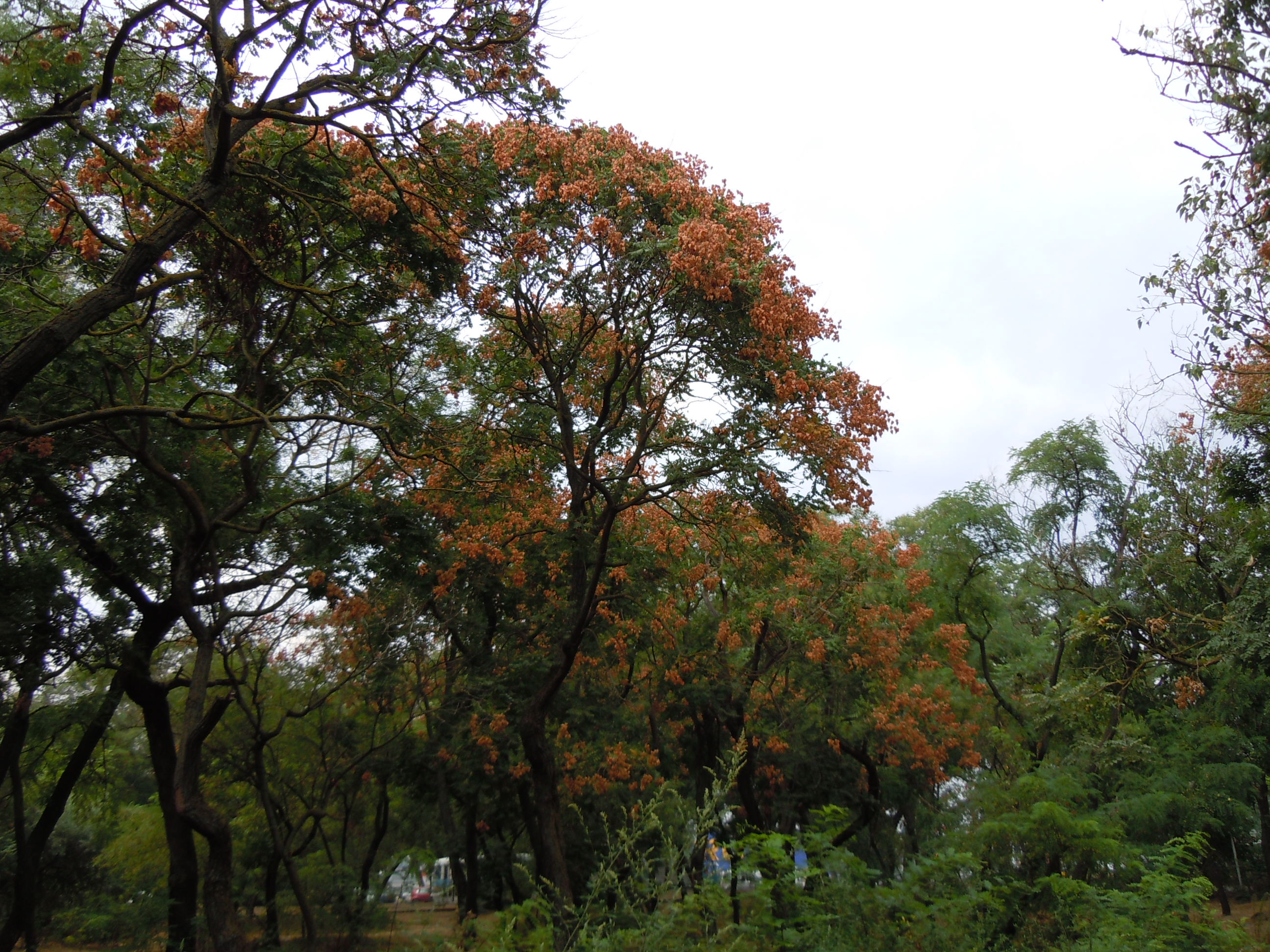
The goldenrain tree (Koelreuteria paniculata) is artificially planted

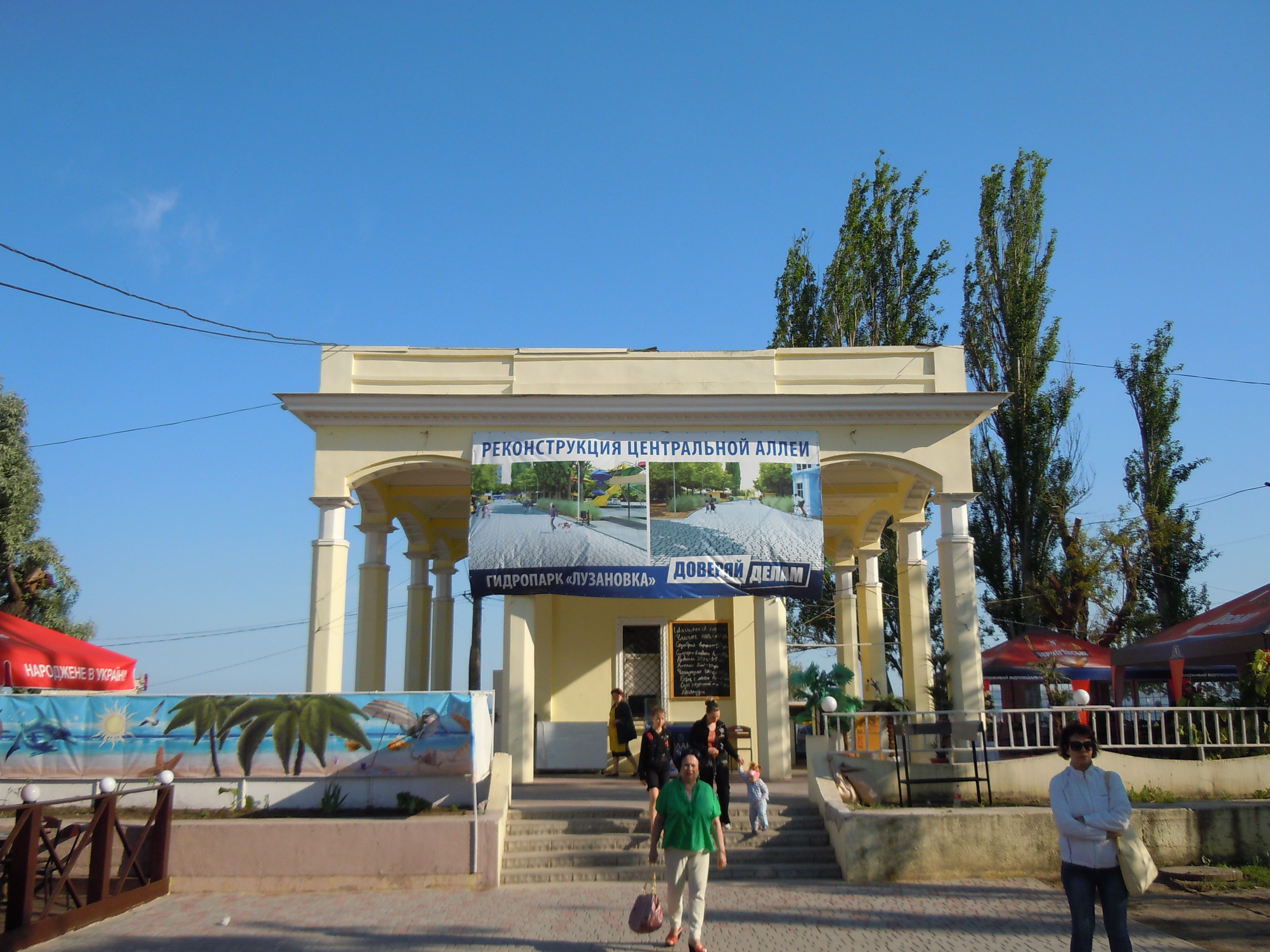
The pavilion on the central avenue at the entrance to the beach

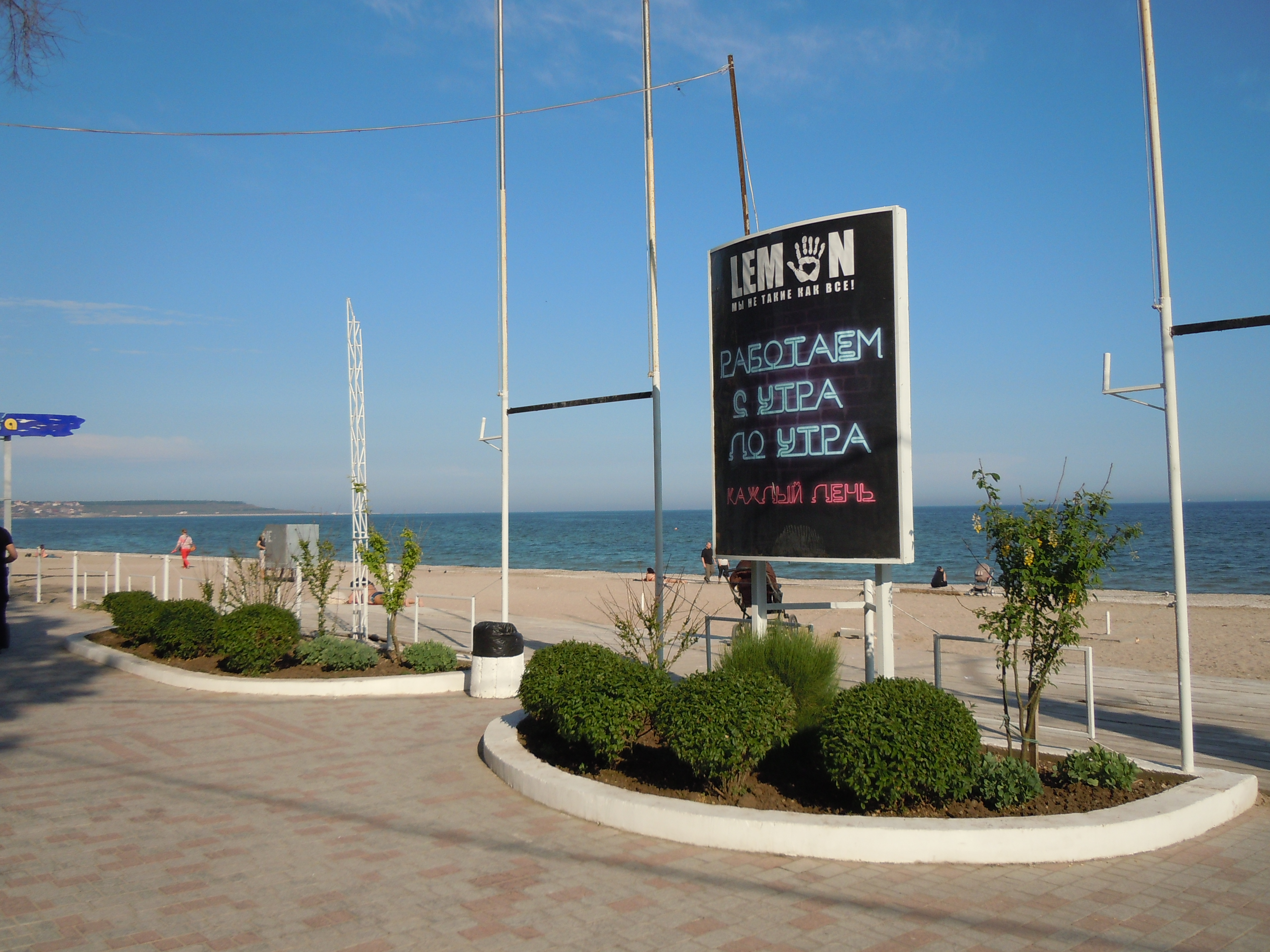
The avenue along the beach

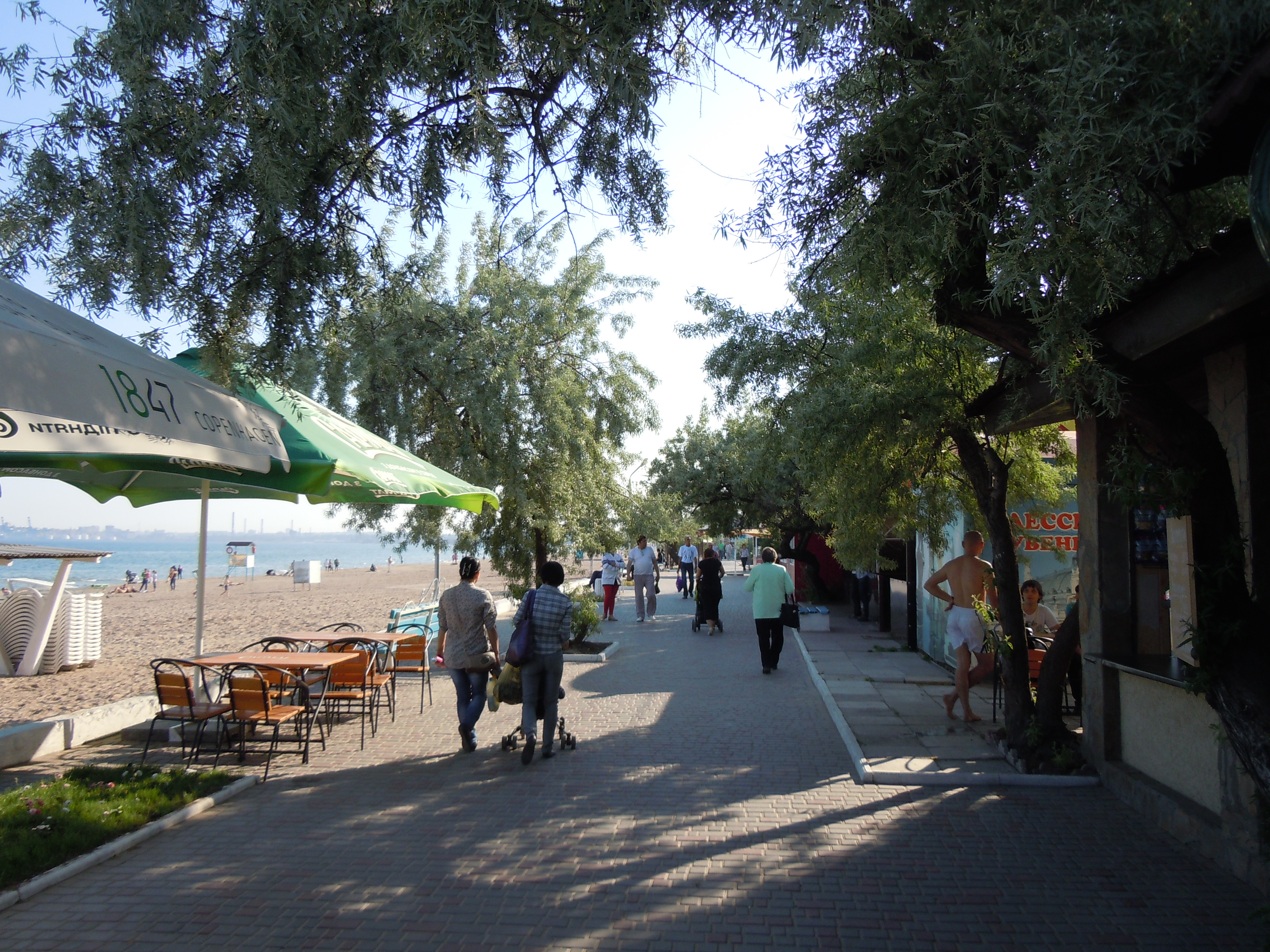
The avenue along the beach

== Sources ==
- Одесские парки и скверы: Парк Лузановка
- http://od.vgorode.ua/reference/company/94044/part/70-kp-hydropark-luzanovka
- http://viknaodessa.od.ua/old-photo/?luzanovka
- Места Одессы: Пляжи
- Пляжи Одессы
- В Суворовском районе Одессы благоустроен гидропарк «Лузановка»
- http://info-center.od.ua/11308-v-odesse-blagoustraivayut-centralnuyu-alleyu-gidroparka-luzanovka-foto.html
