= Hydropark in Kyiv =

Park in Ukraine

Hydropark
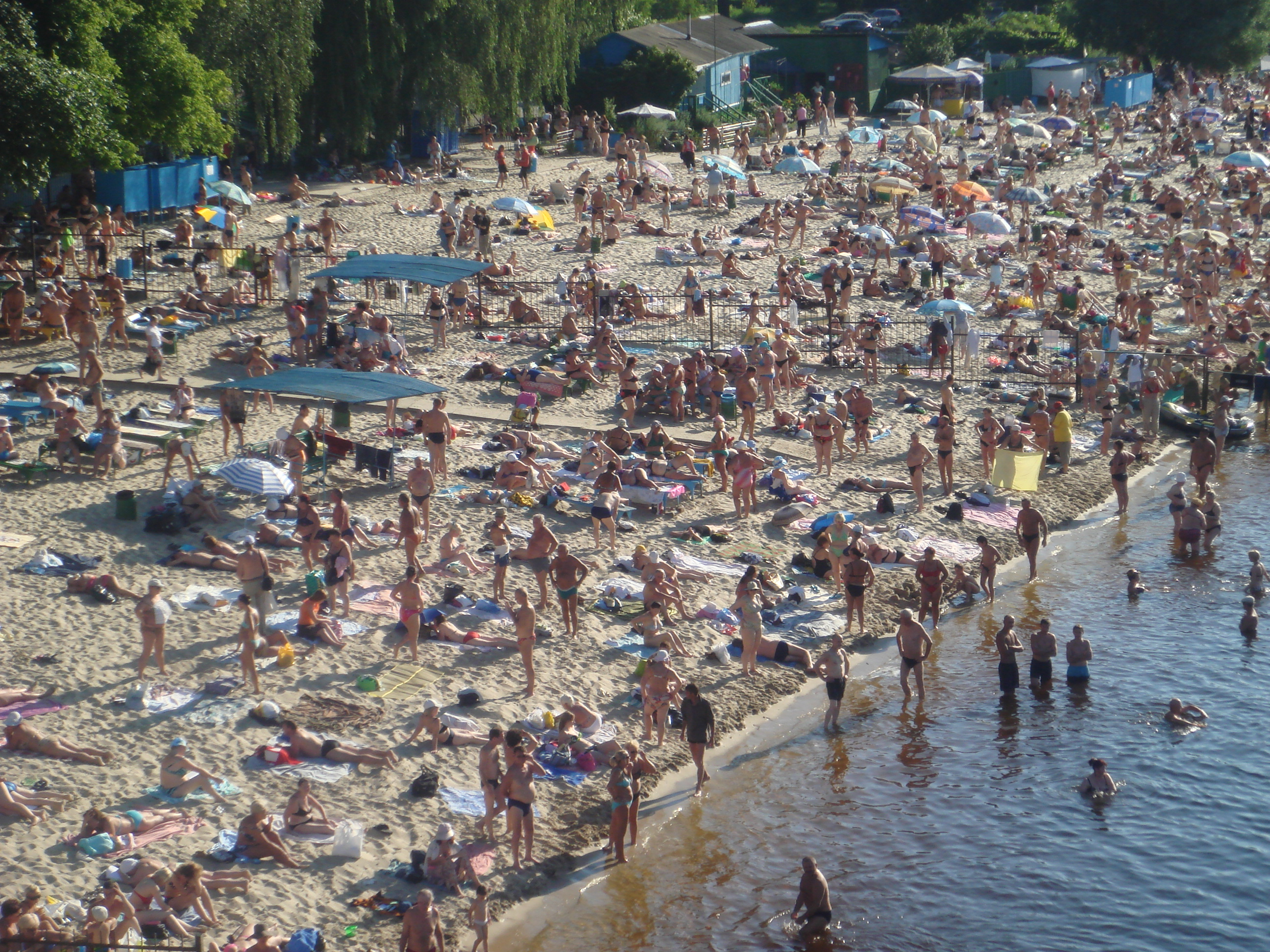
- Hydropark beach in July, 2008
- Interactive map of Hydropark
- Location: Kyiv, Ukraine
- Coordinates: 50°26′37″N 30°34′37″E
- Owner: KP "Hydropark"
- General manager: Denys Vasylenko
- Opened: 1968
- Operating season: summer
- Area: 365 ha (900 acres)
- Pools: 6 beaches pools
- Website: www.gidropark.org.ua

Hydropark, or Hidropark (from Ukrainian: Гідропарк) is a landscape-recreational park on the Dnieper River in Kyiv, Ukraine.

== History ==
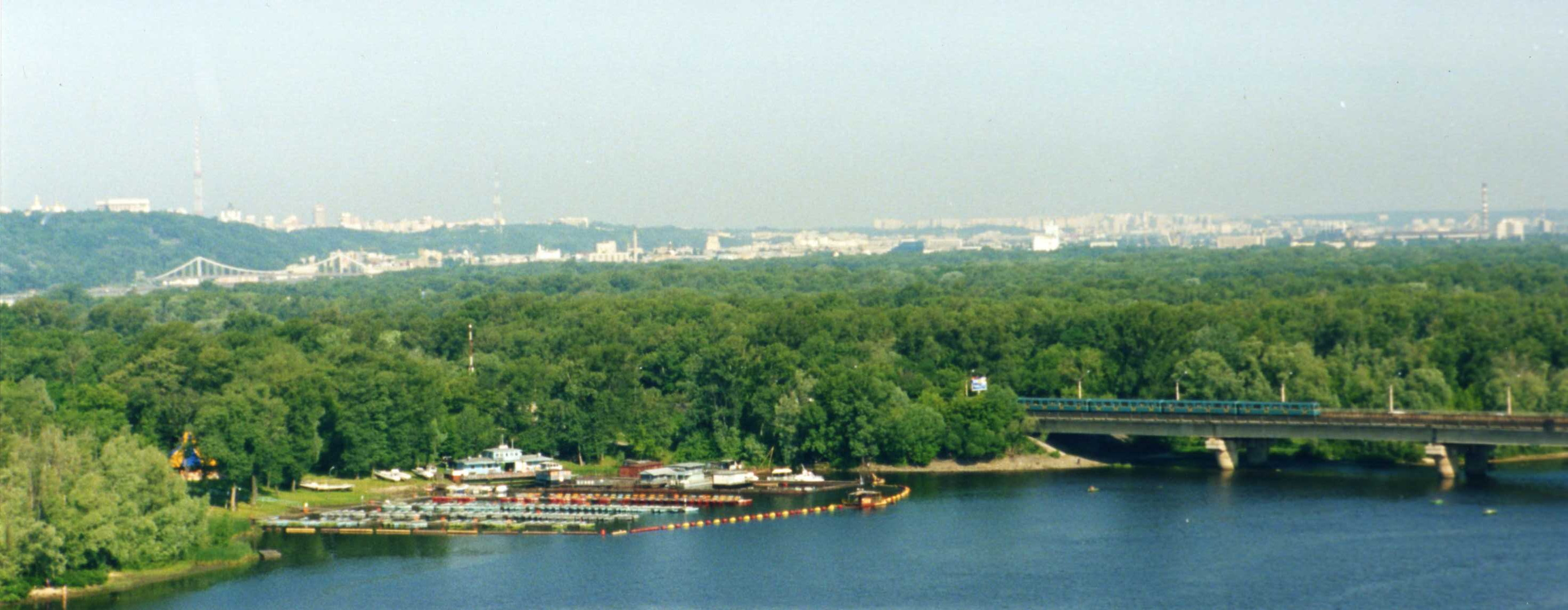
General view of Hydropark seen from the Rusanivka neighbourhood on the left bank of the Dnieper

It was created as an entertainment complex with mainly water activities: beaches, boating, water attractions. It is located on Venetsiiskyi (Ukrainian: Венеційський) and Dolobetskyi (Ukrainian: Долобецький) islands; the Venetian Bridge connects these islands. Venetsiiskyi Island is connected with the rest of Kyiv by two bridges: the Metro Bridge to the right-bank city and the Rusanivka bridge to the left-bank city. The Hidropark station of Kyiv Metro is located on Venetsiiskyi Island.

Current activities available: number of beaches (including one for children and one for nudes), boat and catamarans rental, ping-pong and tennis, paintball and football, water attractions, restaurants, casino and Sun-City Slavutych disco club (right on the beach), open-air gym (Soviet era heritage) and riverboat excursions.
