= Gessler =

Gessler may refer to:

- Albrecht Gessler, legendary 14th-century bailiff in the William Tell story
- Gessler family, Habsburg ministerial family in the Aargau (13th–15th centuries)
- Gessler (company), distillery
- Gessler (surname), German surname
- 113355 Gessler, asteroid
- Gessler Clinic, P.A., a large outpatient clinic system in Winter Haven, Florida

== See also ==
- Gesser
