= Gessler (surname) =

Gessler or Geßler is a German surname. Notable people with the surname include:

- Albrecht Gessler, 14th century Austrian bailiff connected with the William Tell legend
- Amaka Gessler (born 1990), New Zealand swimmer
- Friedrich Leopold von Geßler (1688–1762), Prussian field marshal
- Doc Gessler (1880–1924), American baseball player
- Otto Gessler (1875–1955), German politician
- Magdalena Gessler (born 1953), Polish restaurateur
- Scott Gessler (born 1965), American lawyer and Secretary of State of the U.S. State of Colorado

== See also ==
- Gesser
- Gessler (disambiguation)
