= Black House, Lviv =

Historical building in Lviv, Ukraine

Black House
- Чорна кам'яниця
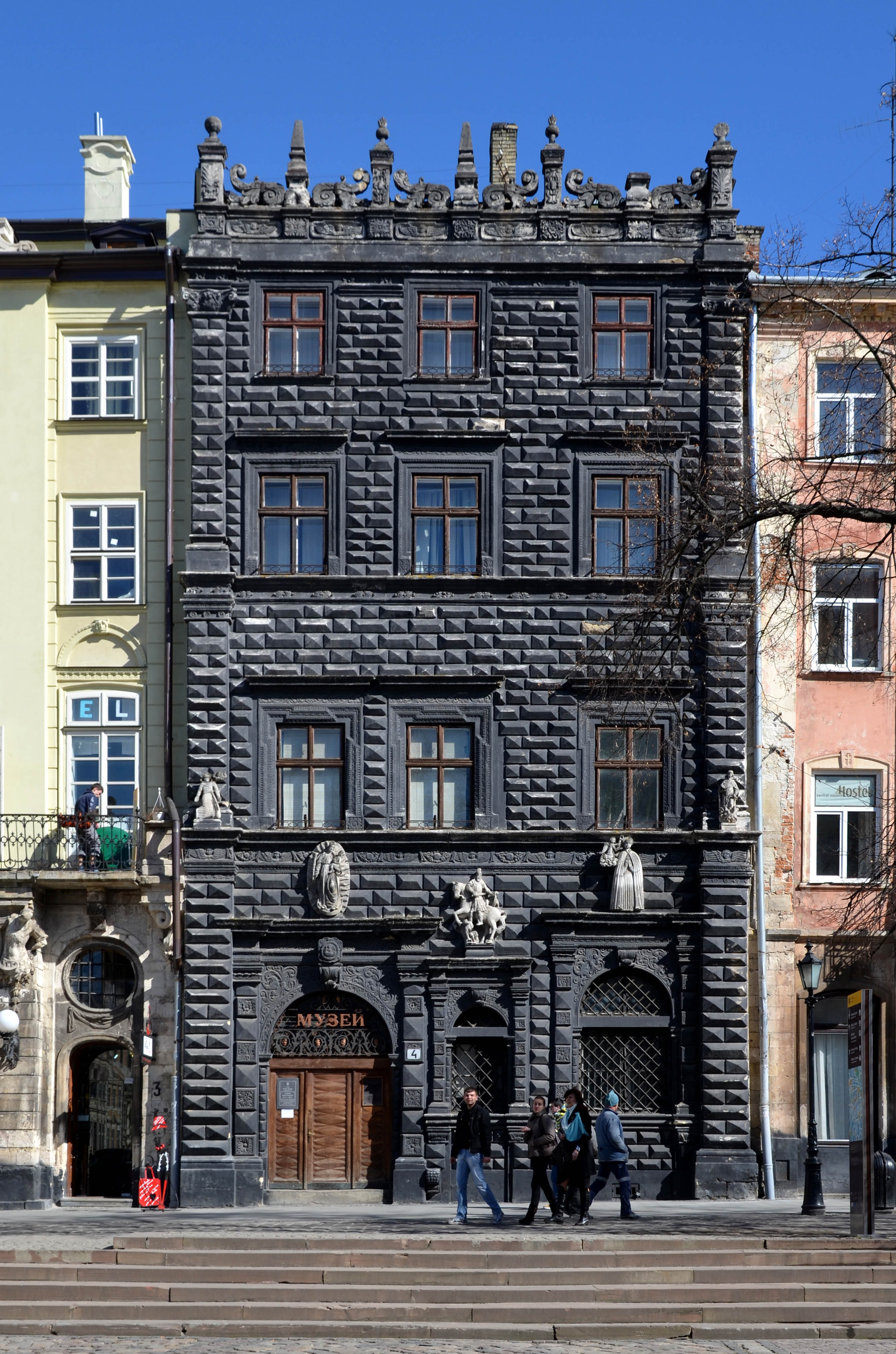

- Location within Ukraine

General information
- Architectural style: Renaissance
- Location: Lviv, Ukraine, Market Square, 4, Lviv, Ukraine
- Coordinates: 49°50′32″N 24°1′57″E
- Construction started: 1577
- Renovated: 1884/1980/2019
- Owner: Lviv Historic Museum

Height
- Height: 4

Design and construction
- Architect: Piotr Krasowski

The Black House (Ukrainian: Чорна кам'яниця, Chorna kamianytsia; Polish: Czarna Kamienica) is a Renaissance building on the Market Square in the city of Lviv, Ukraine. It was built for Italian tax-collector Tomaso Alberti in 1577. The architect was probably Piotr Krasowski. The Lviv Historical Museum has been housed in the Black House since 1926.

The façade is lined with sandstone which has darkened over the years to blackish brown. The front exhibits some fine decorative ornamentation. Jan Lorencowicz acquired the house in 1596, adding another storey and opening one of the town's first pharmacies on the ground floor. The uppermost storey was added in 1884.

== History ==
The first owner of this building, or more precisely, of the "Kyiv House" that occupied the location of the Black House, was Andriy of Kyiv. At the end of the 16th century the Leopolitan patrician Jan Lorencowicz opened one of the first pharmacies in Lviv here.

The daughter of Anchevsky, Anna, and her husband, Dr. Andriy Shimonovich, owned the house after 1682.

In 1732 the building was transferred to Lviv district director Franciszek Wieszniewski, and then in 1760 to the Armenian Nikorovych family. The assessor of the Tribunal, Dominik Nikorovich, received his nobility from the Austrian emperor in 1782. The building was owned by his descendants until 1911.

In 1884 the house was restored in accordance with the project of M. Fehter and A. Piotrovsky. The fourth floor was completed and the gutter, which was in the middle of the building's facade, was moved.

In 1911, the building rights were transferred to Dr. Emil Roinsky. In the same year, a new restoration under E. Zhikhovich began. In 1926, Roysky sold the building to the city government, which placed it in one of the departments of the Historical Museum of the city of Lviv.

The reconstruction and adaptation of the building into a museum continued under the direction of architect L. Diachak, opening on Sunday, September 22, 1929. Since then the building has not changed hands; there is now a department of new and modern history within the historical museum.

Now here is a Department of History of Ukrainian Diaspora of Lviv Historical Museum where some fragments of three streams of Ukrainian emigration movement during the late 19th to late 20th centuries is highlighted. Items collected in the exposition helps to understand that the Ukrainians living outside Ukraine are part of the Ukrainian nation of its shared history, science, culture and art.

== Architecture ==
Before the Renaissance period, stone and brickwork buildings in Lviv were normally crowned with a pitched roof. Subsequently, decorative "attics", or parapets with rich sculptural decoration mounted over the facades, became a characteristic feature of the residential architecture. At one time they embellished the majority of houses in the Market Square and the main streets adjacent to the central square. "Diamond" rustication decorated the facades of many buildings dating from the sixteenth century, including the Black House, built largely during the 1580s.

The four-story construction is elongated from east to west. The surface of the façade is divided by belt courses into three levels, and is completely covered by limestone slabs hewn using a diamond rustication technique. Wide pilasters that flank the façade wall are also rusticated. The décor composition includes a sculpture on the level of the first floor, a white stone border around the portal and windows, and a decorated attic.

According to V. Vuitsyk the facades of Black House and Assumption Church were polychrome namely triglyphs and metopes have traces of red, green, blue and gold paints.

The portals and windows are decorated with marble on the inside of the building.

== The origin of the name ==
While there are rumors and legends regarding the blackening of the house, blaming the juice of walnut husks or the accumulation of soot from wood-burning heat in the winter, the dark façade of the house is the result of basic oxidation: white lead was used as a primer for the colors of the façade, but over the years exposure to the elements has darkened it entirely. The dark coloration of the Black House is now maintained through regular upkeep.

== Renovation 2017 ==
The Lviv Historical Museum has won a grant from the US Embassy's Fund for the Preservation of Cultural Heritage for $275,000. The museum has added 29 thousand dollars. Masters works by laser scanning.

For the money from the grant is planned to make the waterproofing roof, strengthen walls, to restore the internal and internal facades of the building, interiors on the first floor, to organize courtyard, and to create the conditions for exhibiting collection of architectural and sculptural details from the funds of the Lviv Historical Museum.

On the facade of the building were found gray shades, and on the elements of stucco gilding.

The end of the restoration is scheduled for 2019.

== Gallery ==
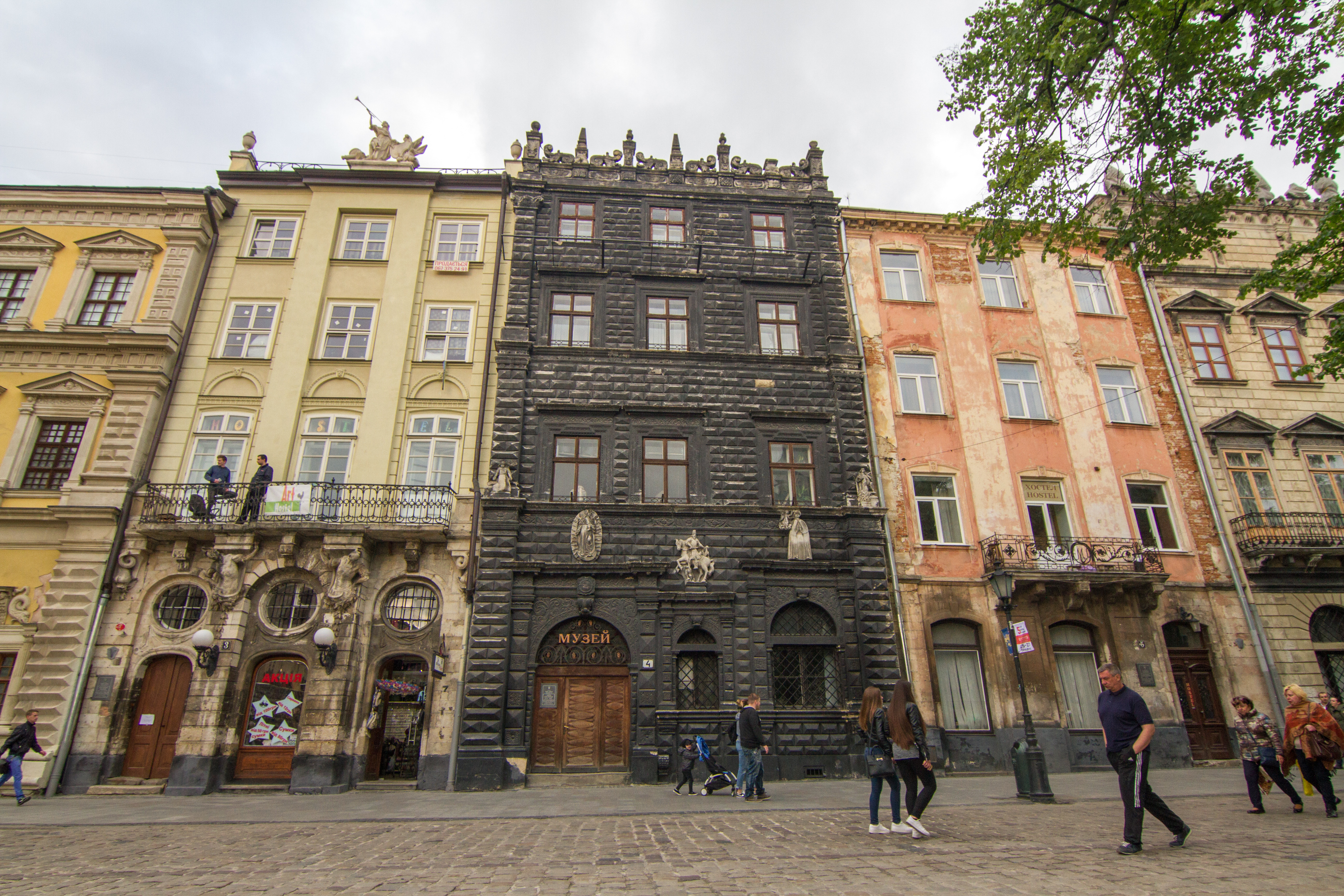

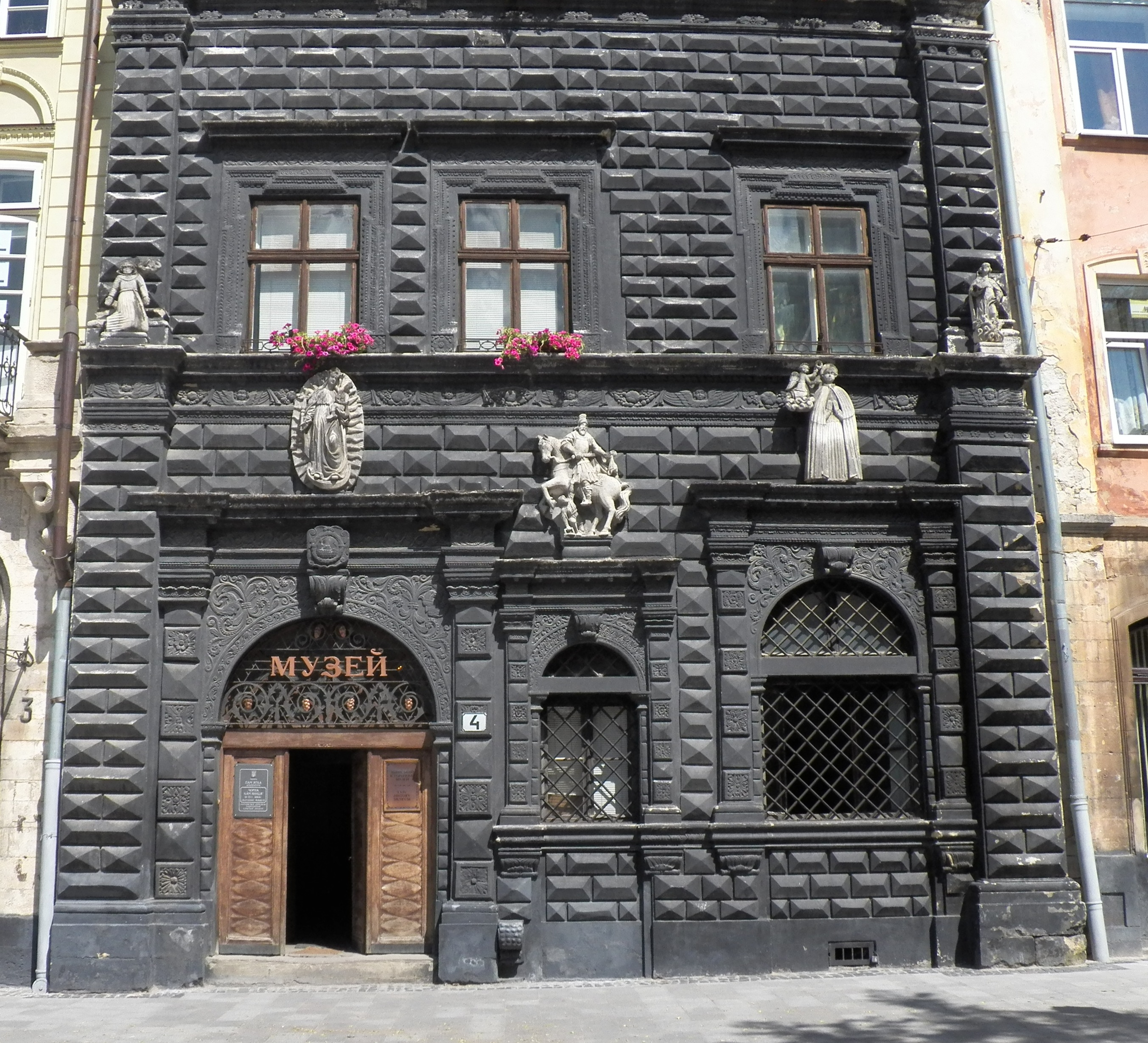

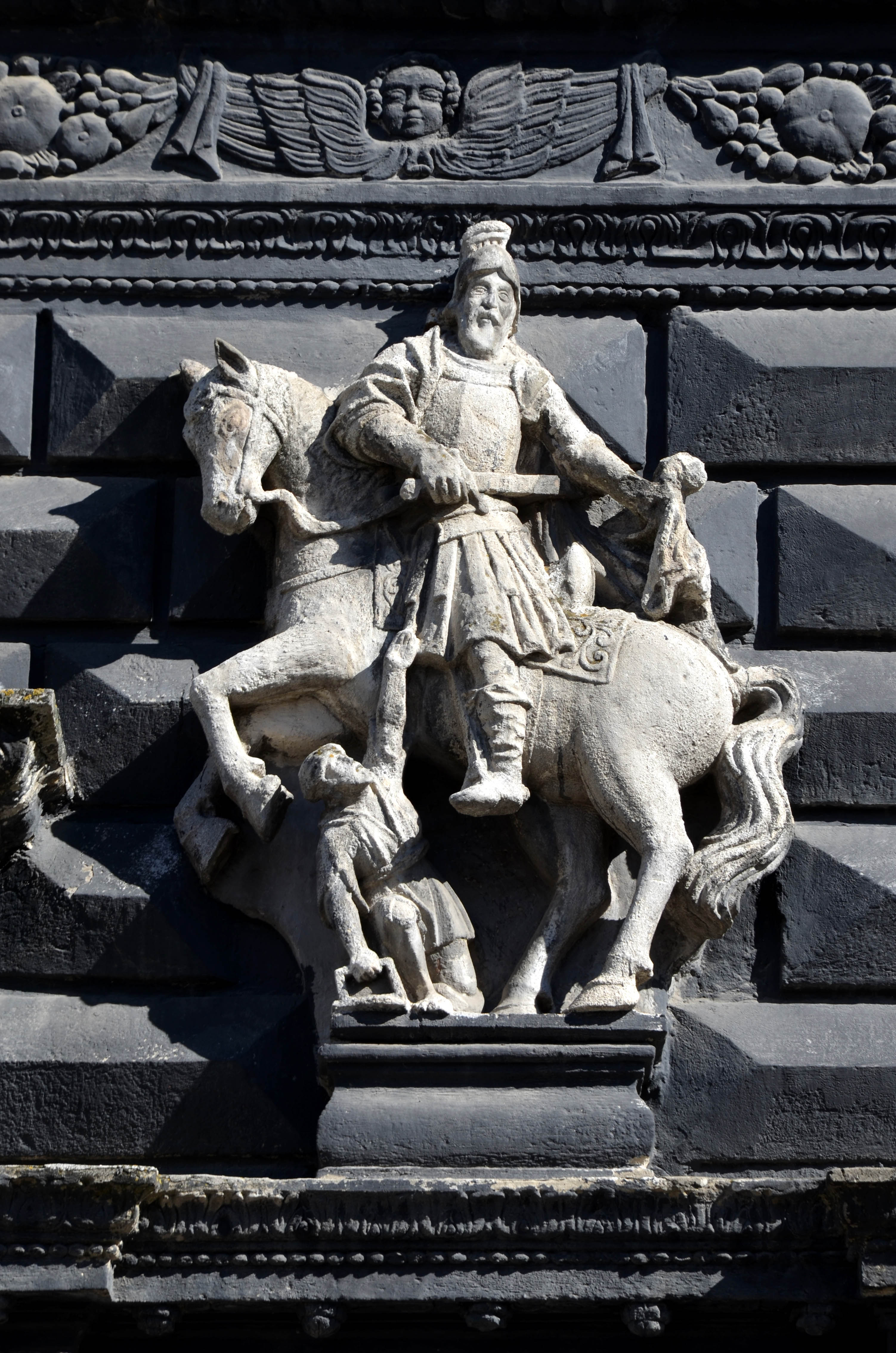

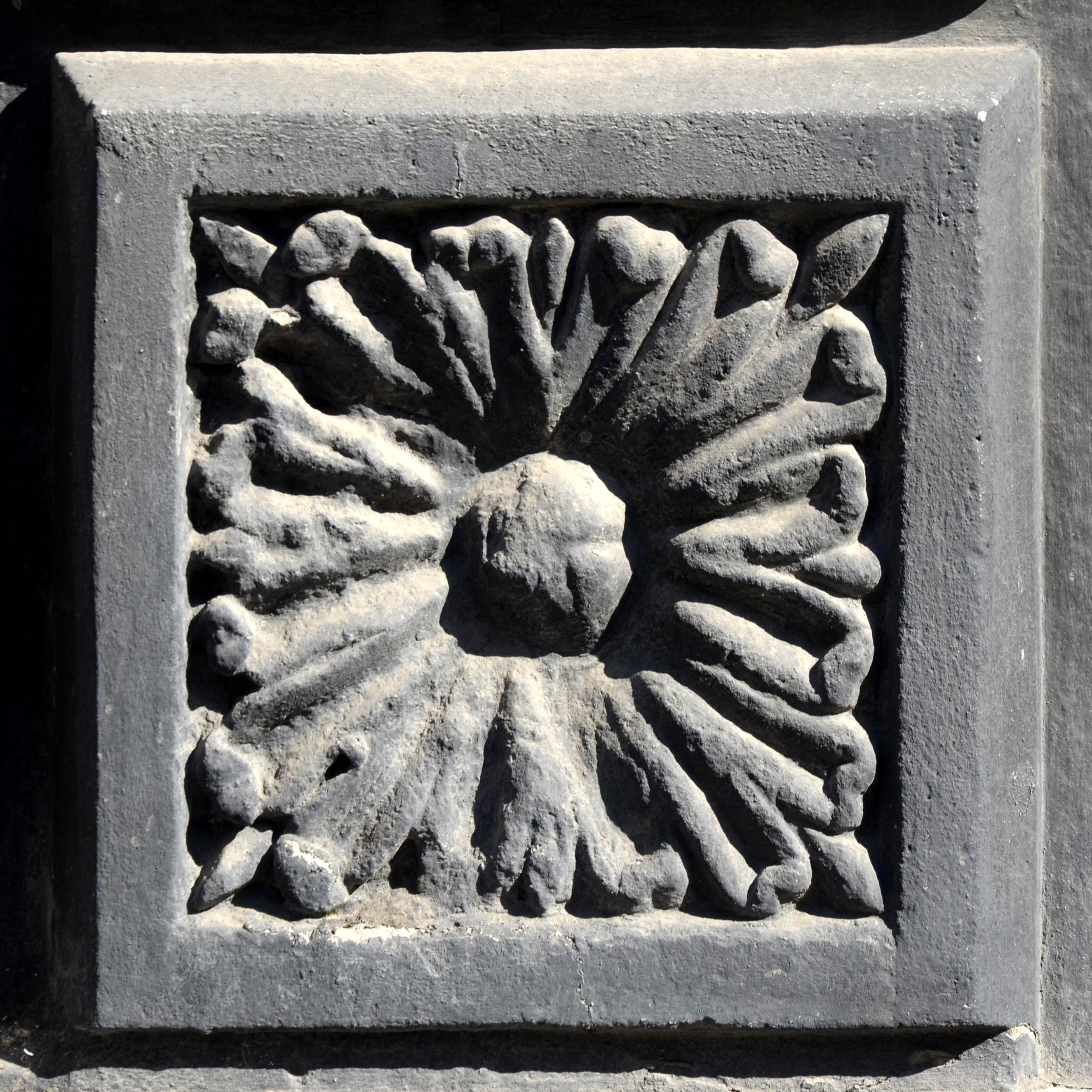

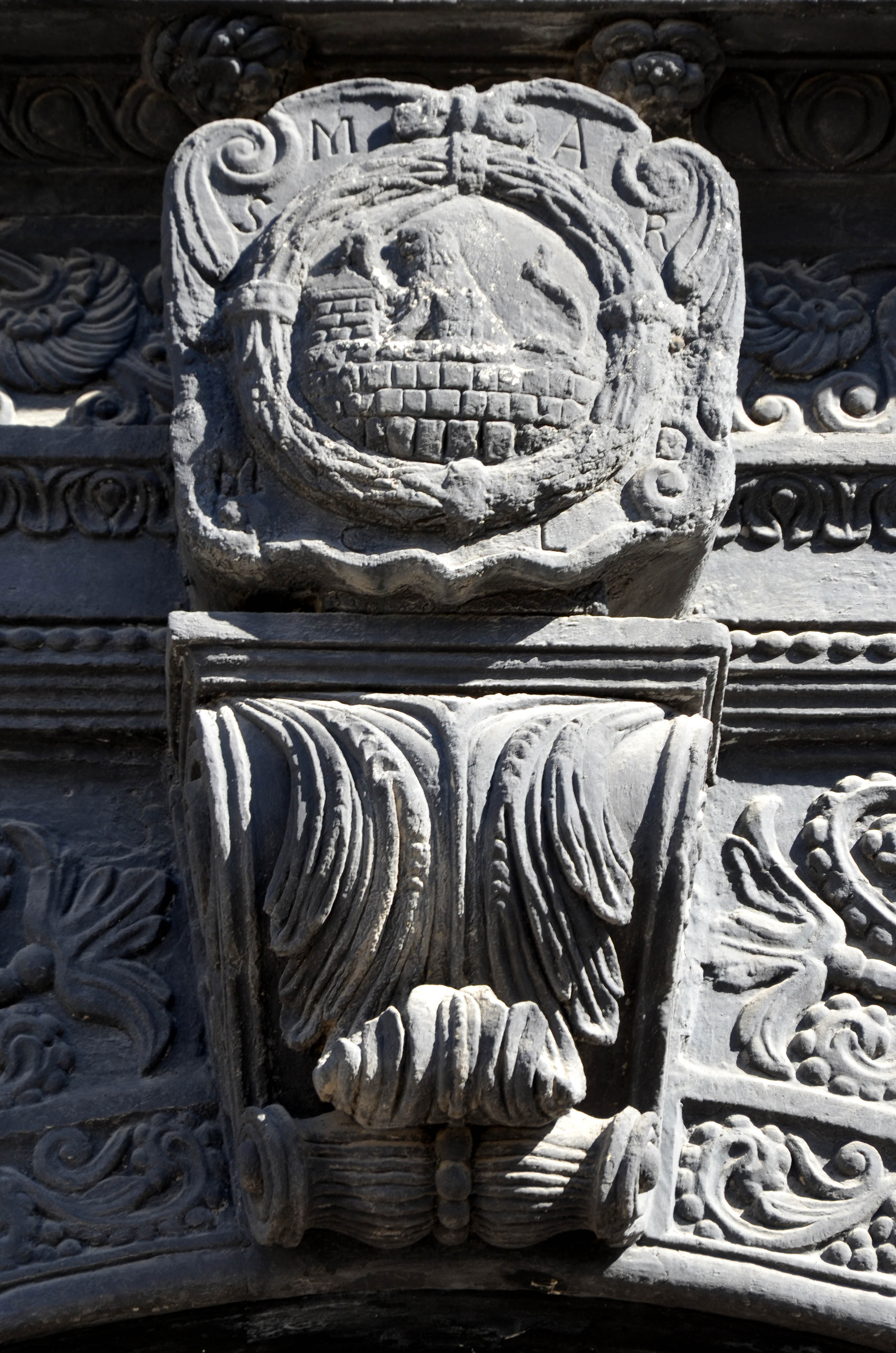

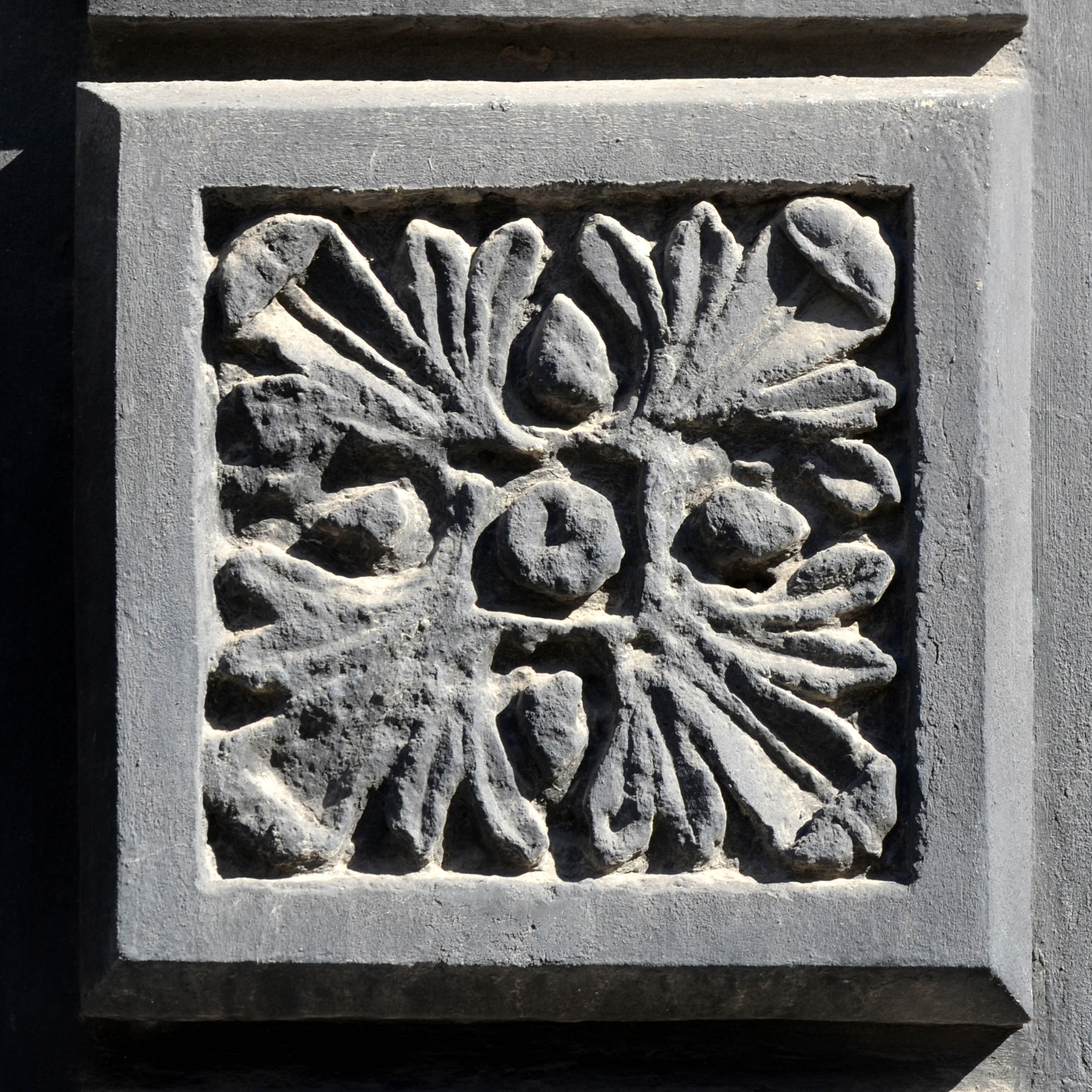

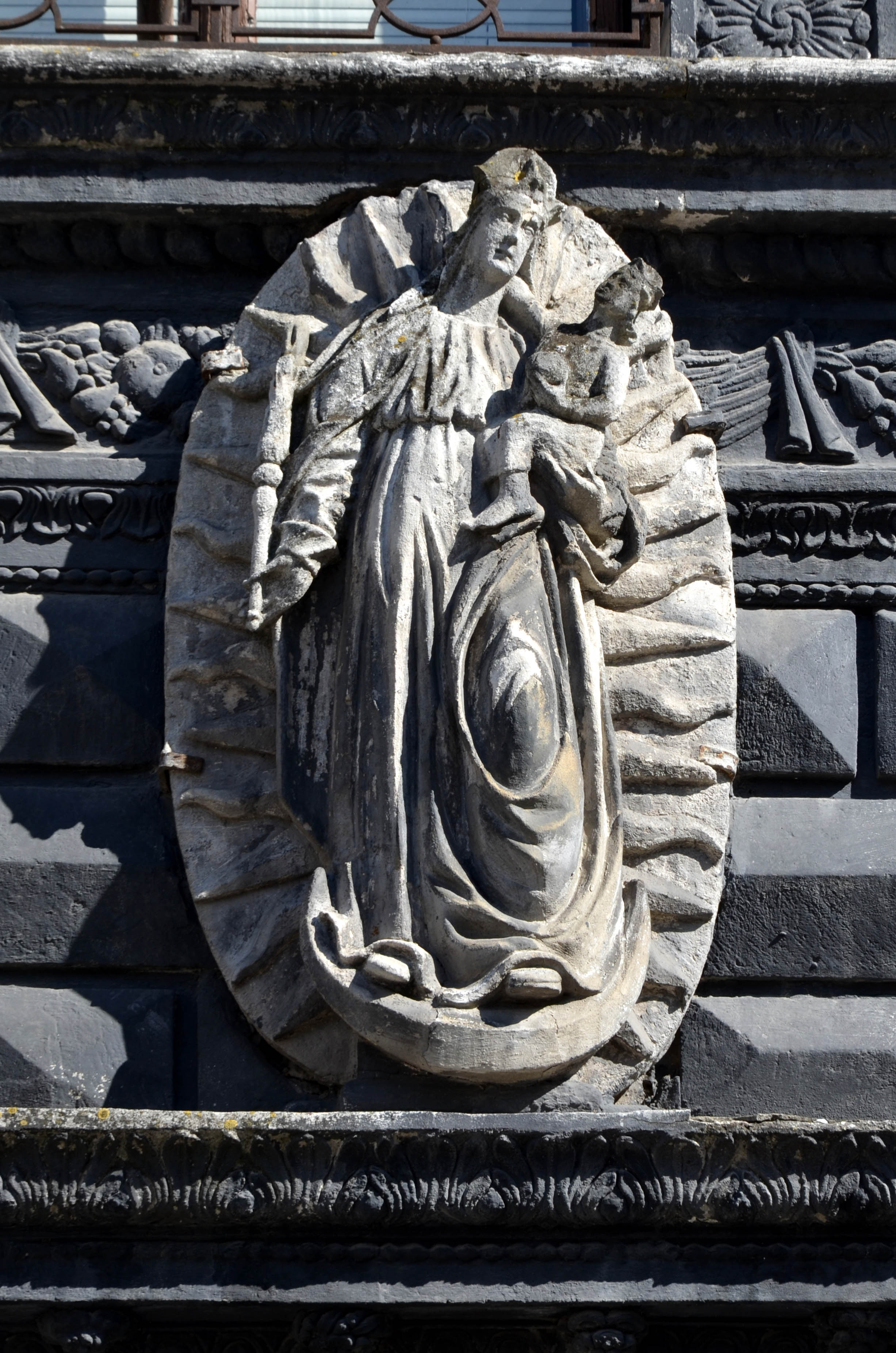

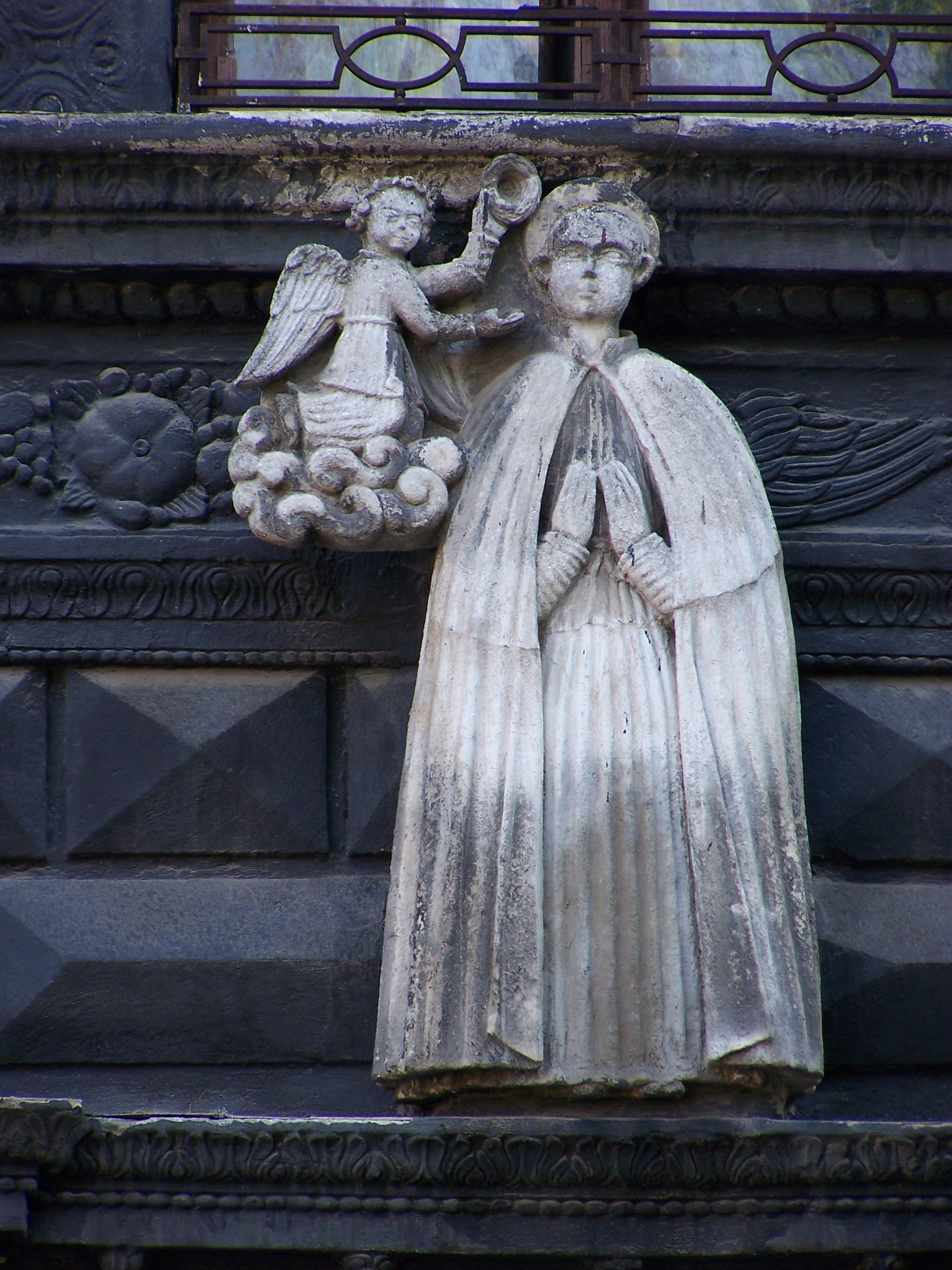

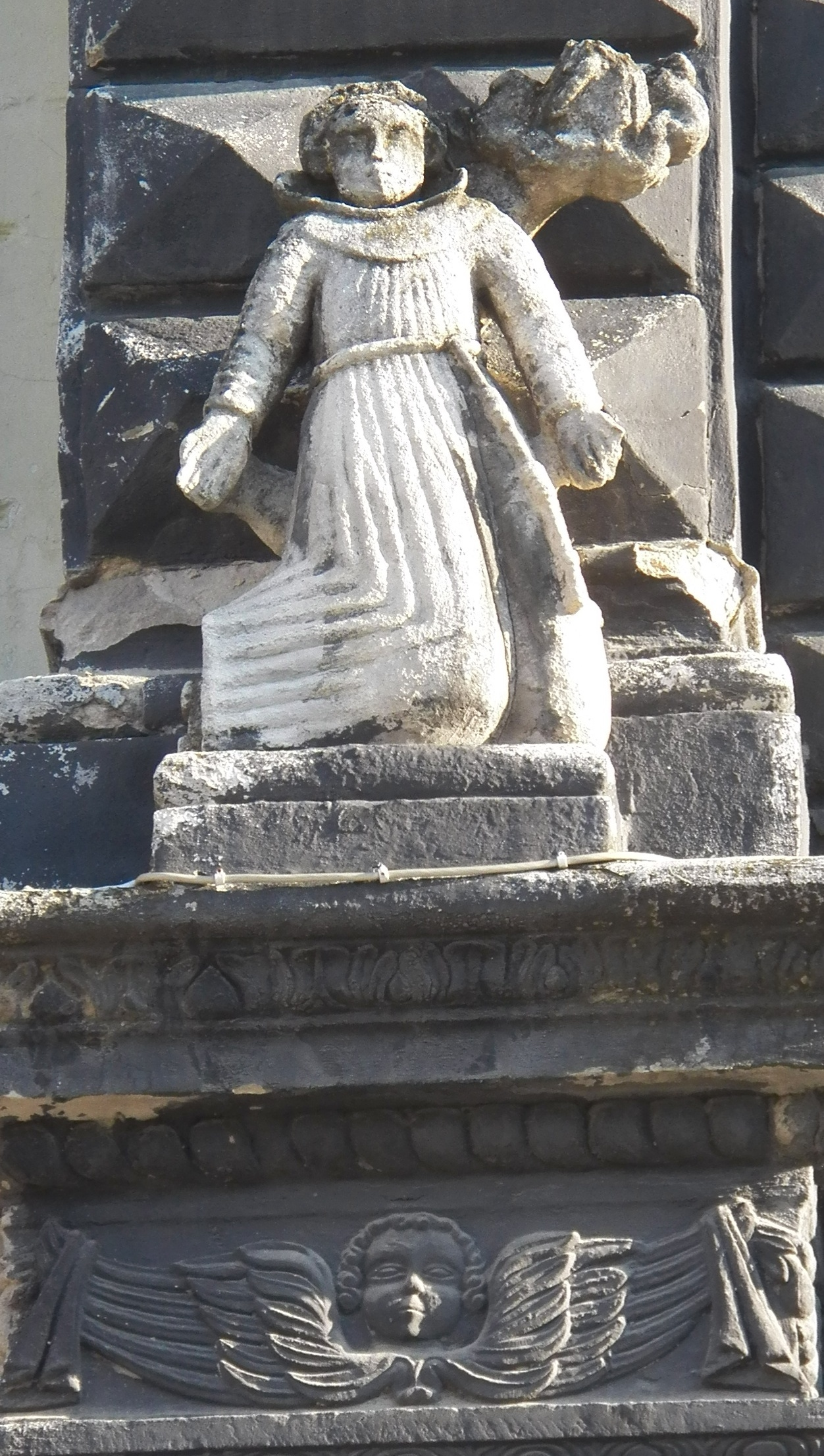

== See also ==
- Pharmacy Museum, Lviv
- Royal Kamienica, Lviv
