= Gessler (company) =

Austrian liqueur company

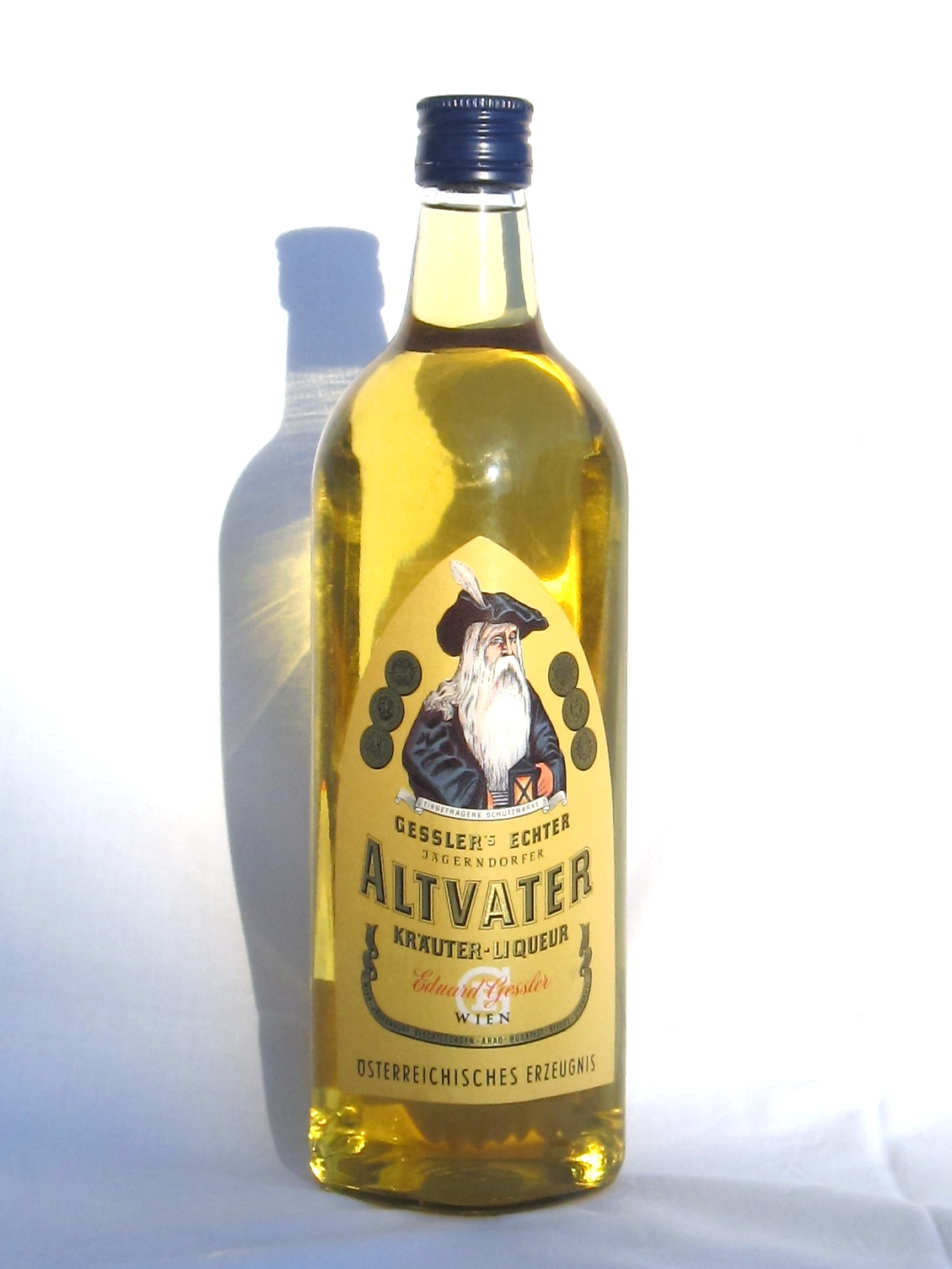
- "Altvater" liqueur by Gessler
- Company type: Private
- Industry: Drink industry
- Predecessor: Geiger Brothers, Spirits and Rosoglio Production
- Founded: 1777; 249 years ago in Bromberg, Prussia
- Successor: Altvater Gessler - J. A. Baczewski
- Headquarters: Vienna, Austria
- Products: Altvater, Monopolowa vodka
- Owner: Elek Gessler
- Website: agjab.com

The Gessler company is an Austrian company that produces liqueur such as "Altvater" as well as Monopolowa vodka.

== History ==
The original company was founded in Bromberg, Prussia (today, Bydgoszcz in Poland). In 1873, the company, which supplied the entire Austro-Hungarian Empire, was reorganized in Jägerndorf (Krnov), Czech Silesia. Its brand name “Altvater” (“old father”) gained renown using the slogan 3 Worte: Altvater-Gessler-Jägerndorf, and was the company was awarded the title "Purveyor to the Imperial and Royal Household".

After the collapse of Austria-Hungary after World War I, licenses were granted to branches in Vienna, Budapest, Czernowitz (Chernivtsi), Bielitz (Bielsko) and Agram (Zagreb). The company was run and owned by Siegfried Gessler and his brother-in-law Leo Westreich, the company's former accountant. Siegfried Gessler died in 1890 and Leo Westreich in 1922, and then his wife Felice Westreich took over running the business together with her sister-in-law Sidonia Gessler (died 1925). The Nazis confiscated the business in 1939, and Felice Westreich and eldest daughter Irma were killed at Theresienstadt concentration camp in 1942, Leo and Felice's daughter Gertrude Löwenbein was murdered in the mass shooting in the forest at Banská Bystrica, Slovakia, in November 1944. Westreich's only remaining direct descendant to have survived was youngest daughter Liesl Herbst (née Westreich), who was Austrian and also Moravian tennis champion of the 1930s and managed to escape to England with her husband and daughter.

After the Second World War, the company was nationalized and became state operated. Eduard Gessler distantly related to the Baczewski family, bought the Altvater Gessler Company in Vienna, Austria, and reacquired the J. A. Baczewski mark. Under Eduard Gessler’s guidance, Altvater Gessler and J.A. Baczewski reunited under the combined name Altvater Gessler - J.A. Baczewski, with its principal place of business in Vienna, Austria.

The reconstituted company continued to specialize in quality alcoholic products for domestic consumption in Austria and for export to various countries in various continents, to include Australia, Africa, Asia, Europe and North America, most notably the United States. Its centuries’ old reputation and record of quality led to its being selected as the only representative of the Austrian liquor industry at the International World Fair in Chicago in 1950.

Following Eduard Gessler’s death in 1979, his son Elek Gessler consolidated the affairs of both traditional companies into one new legal entity in 1980, which to this day is known as “Altvater Gessler – J.A. Baczewski, GmbH”, an Austrian corporation. In 1983, Elek Gessler established Altvater Gessler – J.A. Baczewski International (USA) Inc., a New Jersey, USA, Corporation, to manage United States operations. To this date, both companies are owned solely by the Gessler family.
