= Angelo Maria Bandinelli =

Italian statesman

Angelo Maria Bandinelli, sometimes written Angiolo Maria (active around 1650–1670) was a secretary to John II Casimir Vasa, and postmaster general (Latin: in generalissimum et supremum postae...magistrum et praefectum) of the Polish–Lithuanian Commonwealth.

== Life ==
Angelo Maria travelled to Poland-Lithuania in 1650 to enter the service of the king as a secretary. His eldest brother, Roberto Bandinelli, who had founded the postal service of Lviv, had been in royal service since 1629. At the death of Carlo Montelupi, postmaster general, in 1662, Angelo Maria, formerly his rival, was appointed as his successor. He served as postmaster general until 1670, when he returned to Italy to enter the service of Cosimo III de' Medici, Grand Duke of Tuscany.

== Bibliography ==
- R. Mazzei, "I Bandinelli di Firenze fra Toscana e Polonia (secoli XVII-XVIII)", in Zeszyty Naukowe Uniwersytetu Jagiellonskiego, Prace Historyczne, 110 (1994), pp. 163-173.
