= Liesl Herbst =

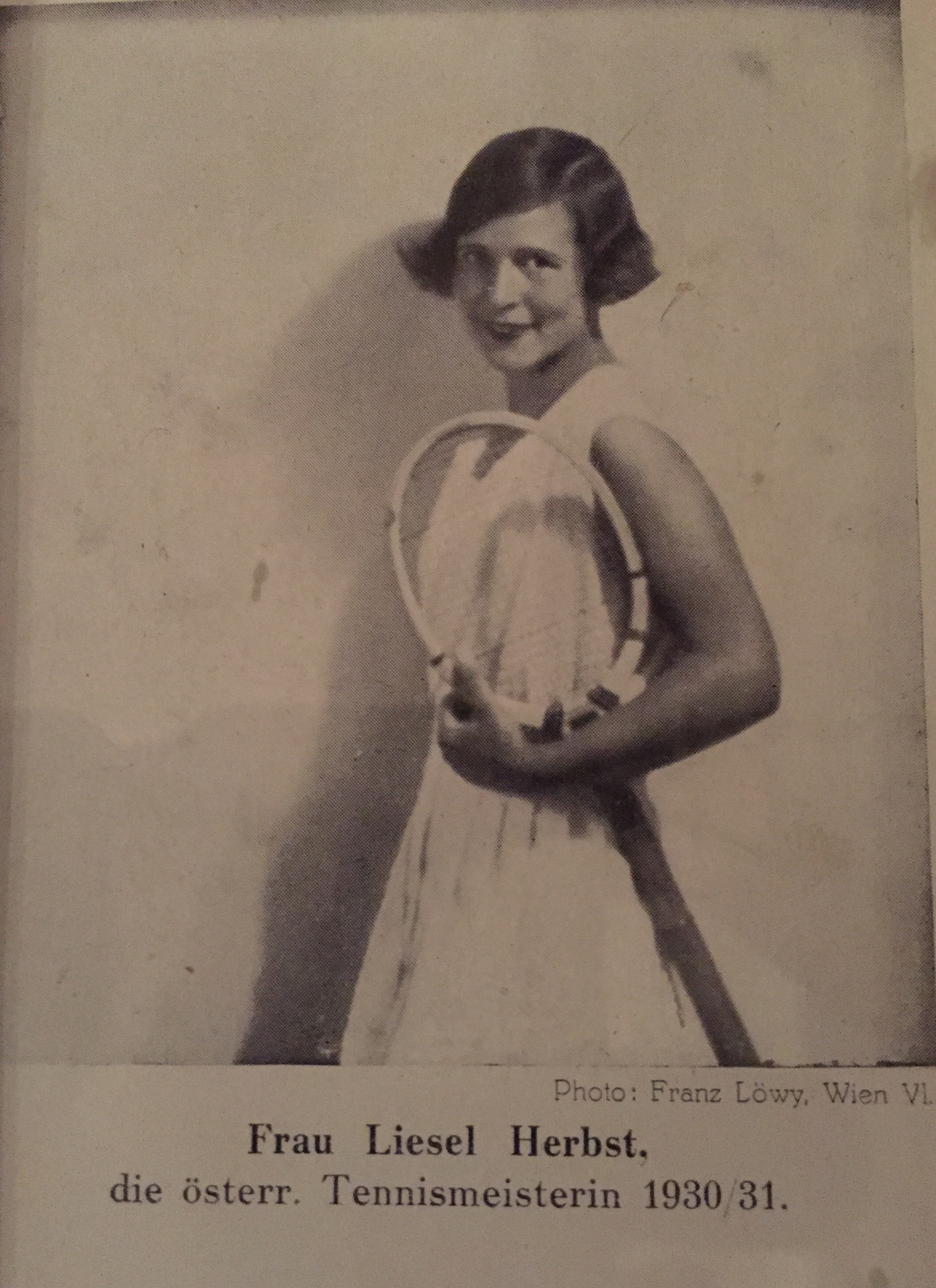
- Liesl Herbst, Tennis Champion of Austria 1930/31
- Born: Liesl Westreich; 8 November 1903; Jägerndorf, Silesia
- Died: 25 February 1990 (aged 86); London, England
- Occupation: Tennis player
- Spouse: Dezso (David) Herbst
- Children: Dorrit (Dorli) Mills née Herbst

Liesl Herbst (8 November 1903 – 25 February 1990) was an Austrian tennis player of Jewish descent.

== Biography ==
Liesl Herbst (née Westreich) was born on 8 November 1903 in the town of Jägerndorf (now called Krnov) in Silesia where her family owned the Gessler distillery. She lived in Villa Westreich with her parents and two older sisters. Her father Leo Westreich ran the company together with his brother-in-law Siegfried Gessler.

During World War II, her mother and one sister were killed at Theresienstadt/Terezín concentration camp. Her other sister, Gertruda Löwenbein, was murdered in the mass shooting as a result of the Slovak National Uprising at Banská Bystrica, Slovakia in 1944, along with her husband Rudolph and 16-year-old daughter Anna. Liesl married David Herbst in 1926. He was President of the sporting club Hakoah Vienna from 1928 to 1938.

== Career ==
Herbst became tennis champion of Austria in 1930 and the main part of her career spanned the years between 1929 and 1937, when she participated in more than 70 tournaments in Austria, Yugoslavia, Italy, Czechoslovakia, Poland, Hungary, France, Switzerland, Germany, Greece, and Egypt. She also represented Austria in many international tennis matches. She won at least 15 singles tournaments during her career.

Between 1930 and 1936, when she took prominent places in the national rankings, the Austrian Lawn Tennis Association didn't send any female representatives to Wimbledon or to the French Championships. Although she did not compete in any Grand Slam tournaments at the time she lived in Austria, she played matches against several Grand Slam champions and international stars: Helen Jacobs of U.S., Simone Mathieu of France, and Hilde Krahwinkel Sperling of Germany and Denmark. She won singles matches against former, current and future champions of Austria, Czechoslovakia, Germany, Yugoslavia, Poland, Hungary, and Italy. In the mixed doubles (when they were popular in the 1930s) she partnered almost every Austrian Davis Cup player of that era.

She did not participate in any tournaments in 1938, because after the Anschluss, she and her 12-year-old daughter Dorrit Herbst (later to become a tennis player too) escaped from Austria to live in England where they were joined on 29 March 1939 by her husband David (Dezsö) Herbst. David Herbst had been President of the famous sports club, Hakoah Vienna 1928-1938. She returned to competitive tennis in England in 1939, although there were no tournaments in the country until 1946 due to World War II.

She played at Wimbledon twice, representing Czechoslovakia in the singles in 1939. In order to qualify for Wimbledon 1939, she beat three other woman tennis players. One of them was Susan Billington, grandmother of Tim Henman. As well as playing singles she also partnered her daughter Dorrit in the 1946 Wimbledon doubles tournament. Dorrit competed in the Ladies Singles at Wimbledon in 1946, 1947 and 1948.

== Retirement ==
She gave up tennis in her 60s and became a keen golfer, playing at Wentworth Club several times a week for the rest of her life. She was also a talented skier and ice skater - she only gave up skiing in her 70s when her favorite ski boots fell apart and she didn't like the idea of wearing modern boots. During her skiing days she went to many different resorts all over the Alps and competed in several amateur races, gaining the Swiss Gold Test in St Moritz in 1955. Her daughter Dorrit (Dorli) Mills pre-deceased her in 1978 and her husband David in 1987. She died in London on 25 February 1990. Her grand-daughter, Felice Hardy, has written about her, entitled The Tennis Champion Who Escaped the Nazis, published by Gemini Books in July 2023.
