= Baczewski =

The Baczewski family bears the Sas coat of arms

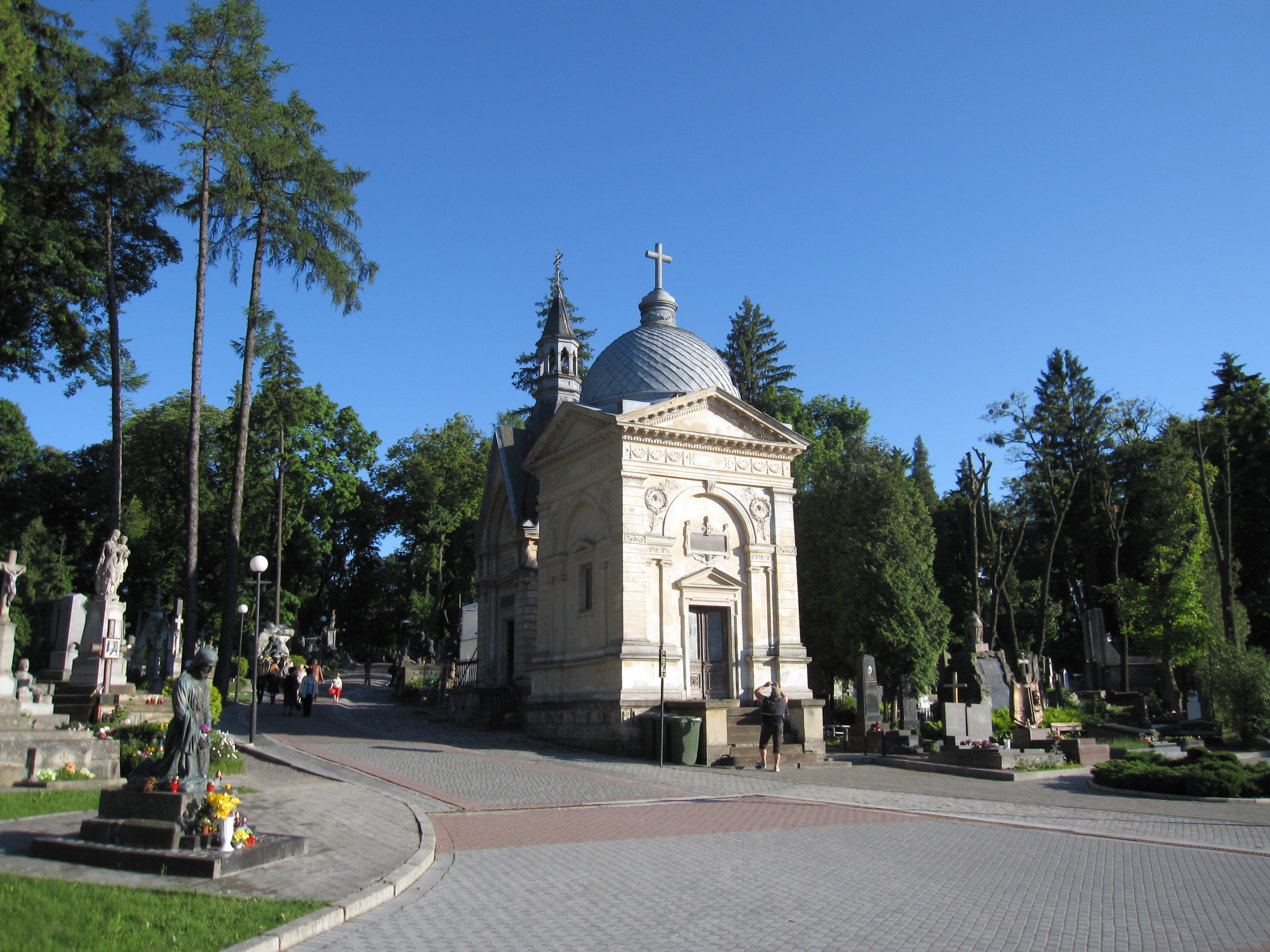
Mausoleum of Baczewski family

Baczewski is a name of a Polish szlachta family, founders of the J. A. Baczewski vodka company. The factory, dating back to late 18th century, was based in Lwów (Lviv) and until 1939 was one of two most popular Polish export goods. The family of Baczewski was of distant Valachian descent and signed itself with the Sas coat-of-arms.

The Baczewski family was one of the most illustrious and wealthiest families in Lwów before World War I and in the interbellum period during the Second Polish Republic. Their residence was at the Lviv market square Nr. 31, which also housed a Baczewski vodka store on the ground floor. The house was renovated in 1923. The family mausoleum sits prominently right at the entrance gate of Lychakiv Cemetery.

== Family members ==
Members of the family include:

- Leopold Maksymilian Baczewski
- Józef Adam Baczewski (1829-1911)
- Leopold Baczewski (1859-1930)
- Henryk Baczewski (1864-1930)
- Stefan Baczewski
