= Bandinelli Palace =

Townhouse in Lviv, Ukraine, built 1589

- Палац Бандінеллі
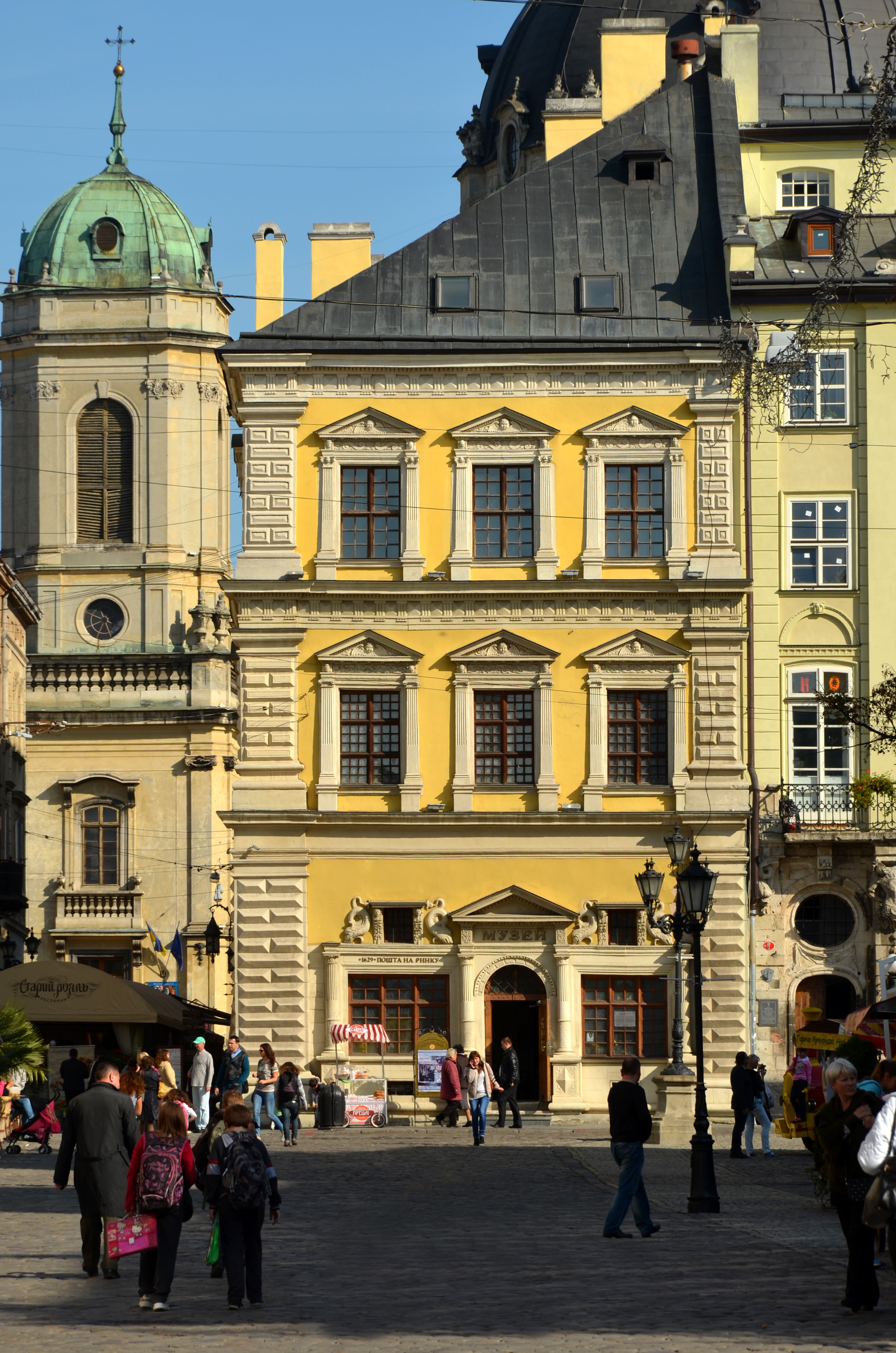
- The Bandinelli Palace at Market Square, Lviv
- Interactive map of the Bandinelli Palace area

General information
- Architectural style: Renaissance
- Location: Lviv, Ukraine, 2 Market Square
- Coordinates: 49.84254°N 24.03250°E
- Current tenants: Lviv Historical Museum
- Completed: 1589
- Renovated: 1737–1739
- Client: Jarosz Wedelski

Bandinelli Palace (Italian: Palazzo Bandinelli; Ukrainian: Палац Бандінеллі; Polish: Kamienica Bandinellich we Lwowie) is a late Renaissance townhouse (kamienica) facing Market Square in Lviv, Ukraine. It was built in 1589 by a pharmacist Jarosz Wedelski, and in 1634 it was bought by a Florentine merchant, Roberto Bandinelli, known as the founder of the first post office in eastern Galicia. That office was housed in the building from 1629 onward, and was closed in a few years when the business became unprofitable.

== History ==
During the Thirty Years' War (1618–1648), a mint operated in the courtyard of the tenement house, which was moved from Kraków during the war.

The house was considerably renovated in 1737-1739. In the 19th century the palace was used as a bookshop and a meeting place for the local literati. Poet Kornel Ujejski lodged here. The Soviet authorities gave the house to the Lviv Historical Museum which had the building thoroughly repaired and restored.
