= Pharmacy Museum, Lviv =

Museum in Lviv, Ukraine

Pharmacy Museum
- Аптека-музей «Під чорним орлом» (Ukrainian)
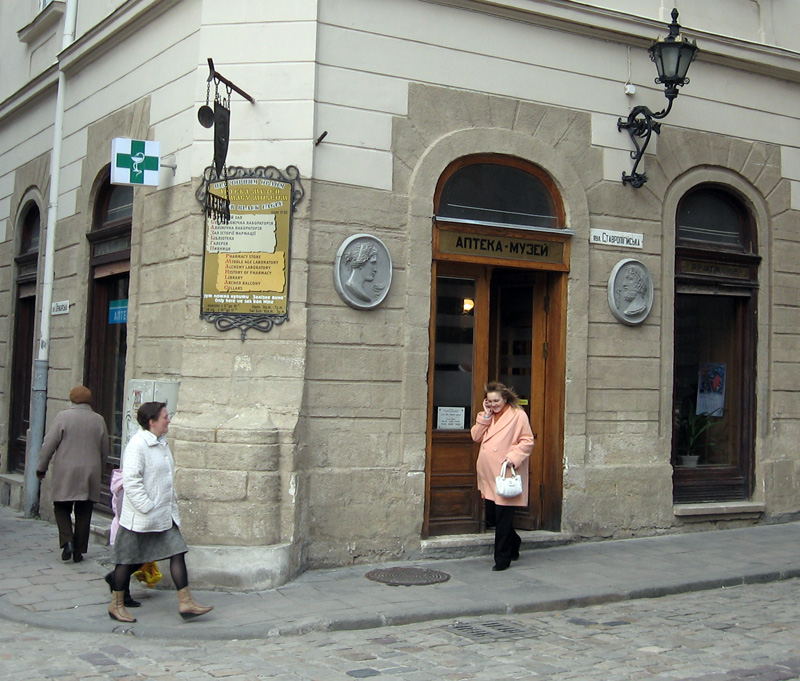
- Pharmacy Museum in Lviv

- Location within Lviv Location within Ukraine
- Established: 1735
- Location: Market Square, Lviv, Ukraine
- Coordinates: 49°50′34″N 24°01′56″E
- Website: www.mvm.lv/en

The Pharmacy Museum in Lviv, Ukraine, was opened in 1966 in the building of an old drugstore at the corner of the Market Square. It is the working drugstore and museum (two in one), the oldest of the existing pharmacies in Lviv. The museum consists of 16 rooms which exhibit antique pharmaceutical appliances, prescriptions, medicines, dishes, a library of pharmacy-related books, and even a reconstructed alchemy workshop.

== History ==
The drugstore was established in 1735 by Wilhelm Natorp, a military pharmacist. It was called "Under the Black Eagle".

== See also ==
- History of pharmacy
