= Roberto Bandinelli =

Italian merchant

- Died: 1650
- Citizenship: Kraków
- Occupations: Merchant; postmaster
- Years active: 1618–1650
- Title: Royal Postmaster
- Term: 1629–1650
- Spouse: Anna
- Children: Lauro, Michelangelo, Carlo, Stanislaus, Costanza, Caterina

Roberto Bandinelli (Polish: Robert Bandinelli, died 1650) was a Florentine merchant and postmaster of Lviv (Lwów) in the Polish–Lithuanian Commonwealth. He was a competitor to the postal service run by the Montelupi family since Sebastiano Montelupi had been appointed master of the royal post at Kraków in 1568. Roberto was the elder brother of Angelo Maria Bandinelli, also a postmaster of the Commonwealth.

== Career ==
Roberto Bandinelli was the son of sculptor Michelangelo Bandinelli and a grandson of Bartolommeo Bandinelli, group leader of Florentine Mannerists, a self-proclaimed rival of Michelangelo and famous Florentine artist in his own right. Roberto, a native of Florence, became a citizen of Kraków in 1618. It is said, that he relocated there to escape lawsuits which threatened him with imprisonment in Florence.

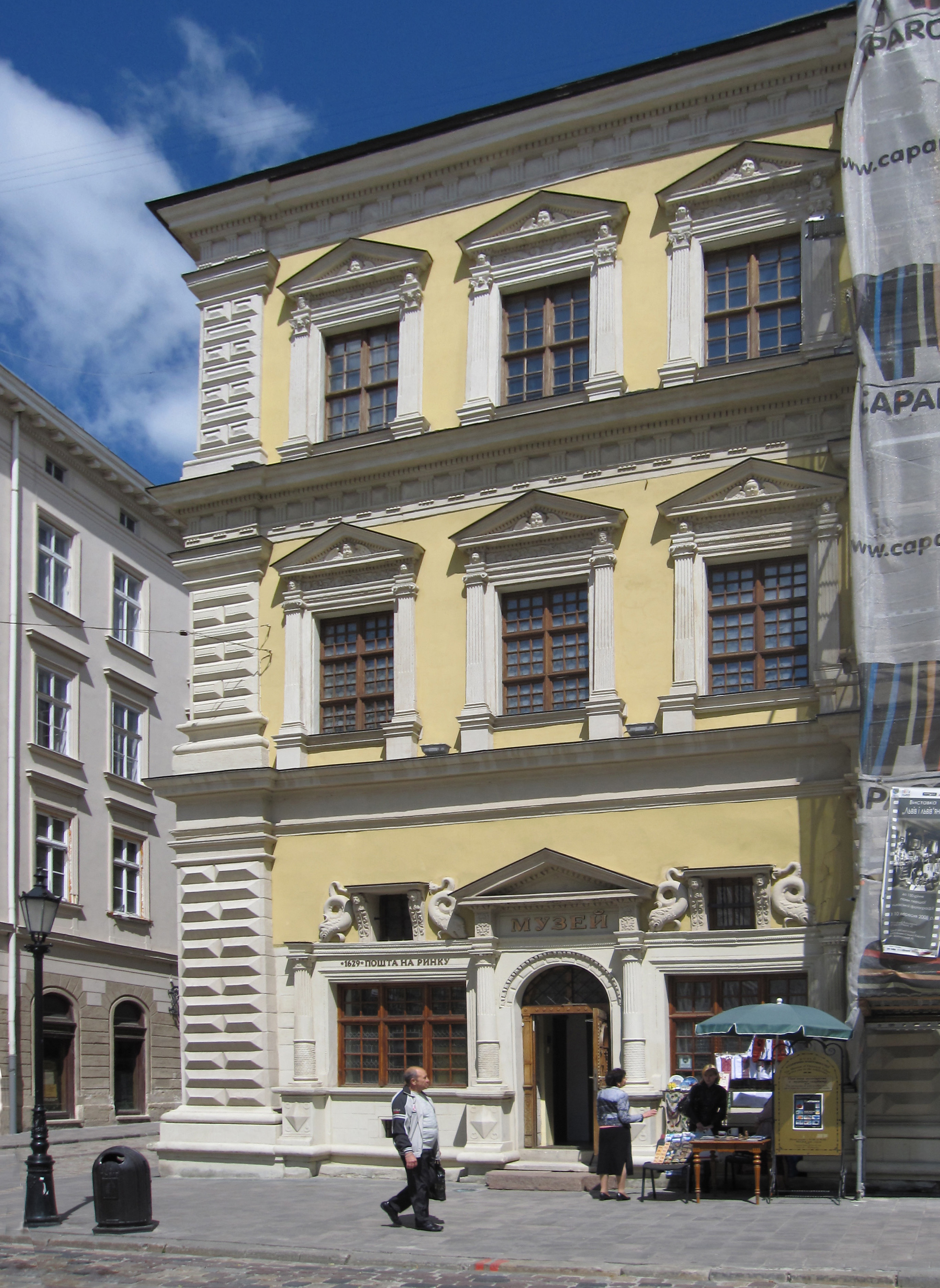
Bandinelli Palace in Lwów

While in Kraków, he engaged in commercial manipulations and shady trade agreements with local merchants in the textile market, which brought him incredibly large profits, but also resulted in numerous litigations. Within a few years he had moved to Lwów (now Lviv, Ukraine). On 4 March 1629 Bandinelli obtained a royal license from Sigismund III Vasa to run two postal services from Lwów: one, to what is now Gdańsk through Zamotja (Zamość), Lublin, Warsaw and Toruń; and another, to Kraków, through Jarosław, Rjashiv and Tarnów. Each of the services was weekly, with the mail leaving every Saturday. The post office was housed in Bandinelli's home, a kamienica on Lviv Market Square that is now known as the Bandinelli Palace (pictured). In later years he expanded his deliveries to include the entire territory of Ruthenia.

Attempts to enforce a royal postal monopoly against the city of Lviv's existing messenger services led to legal disputes that impeded the implementation of Bandinelli's postmastership. In 1633, his monopoly was reconfirmed by Władysław IV Vasa. Stanisław Lubomirski, voivode of Ruthenia, and Stanisław Koniecpolski, voivode of Sandomierz, issued further patents in support of Bandinelli's postal services. These became viable only after 1639, when Bandinelli became the main rival to the postal services that had been run by the Montelupi family since Sebastiano Montelupi had been appointed master of the royal post at Kraków in 1568. Bandinelli married twice, while in Lwów. His first wife, Constance (Constanza) Ubaldini, helped him obtain royal privileges through her father. He built the palace with her dowry, but soon divorced her and remarried Anne Sehnio (Ukrainian: Анна Сеґніо). In 1650 he went to Vienna to negotiate a new postal contract with the city, and died there shortly afterwards. He bequeathed his wealth to his four sons, Lauro, Michelangelo, Carlo and Stanislas, with the exception of the kamienica in Lviv, which went to his wife Anna, to be shared with his two daughters, Costanza and Caterina, for as long as they remained unmarried.

== Bibliography ==
- R. Mazzei, "I Bandinelli di Firenze fra Toscana e Polonia (secoli XVII-XVIII)", in Zeszyty Naukowe Uniwersytetu Jagiellonskiego, Prace Historyczne, 110 (1994), pp. 163–173.
