= Market Square (Lviv) =

Square in Lviv, Ukraine

Coordinates: 49°50′29″N 24°01′53″E

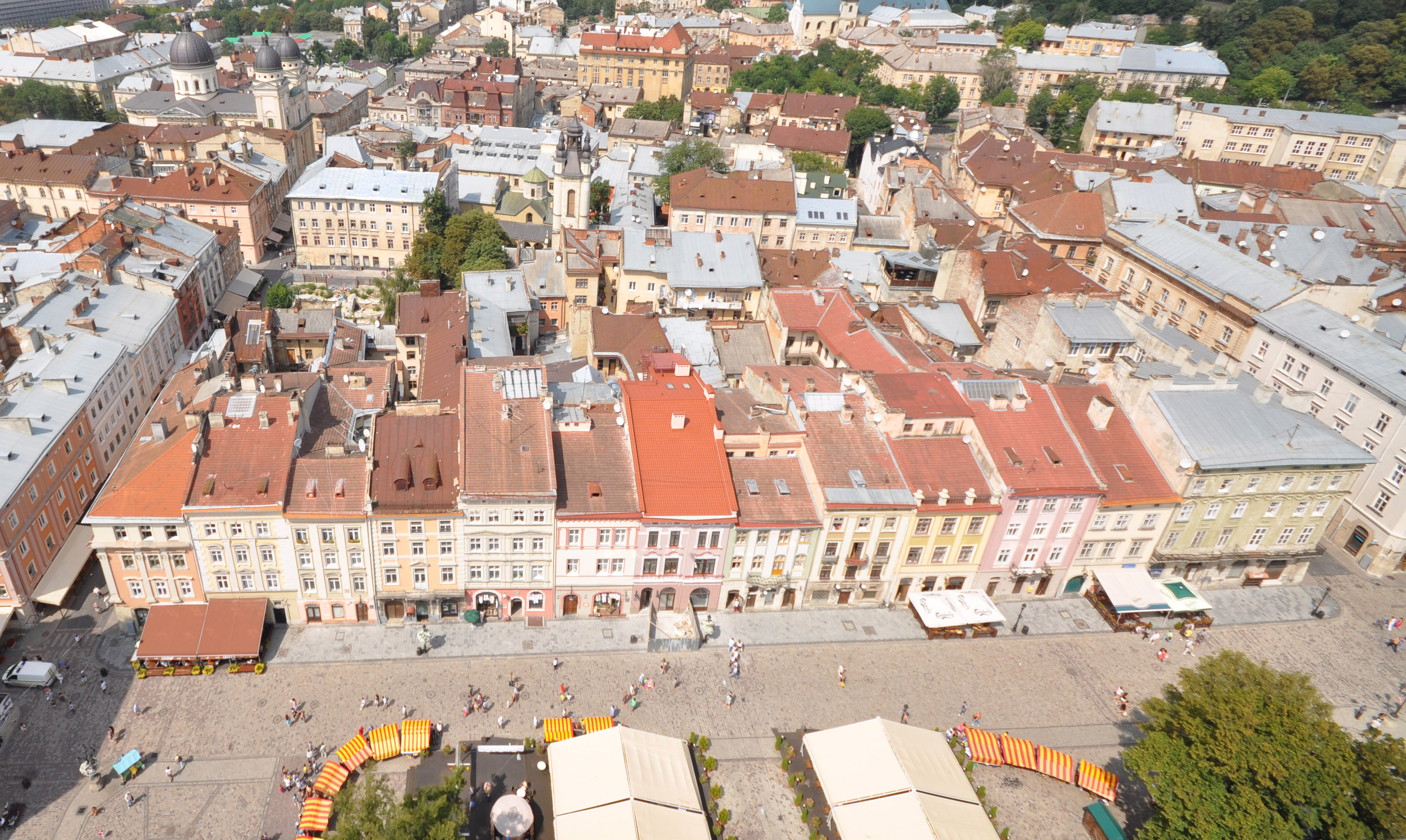
Northern side of the square, seen from the tower of the Town Hall

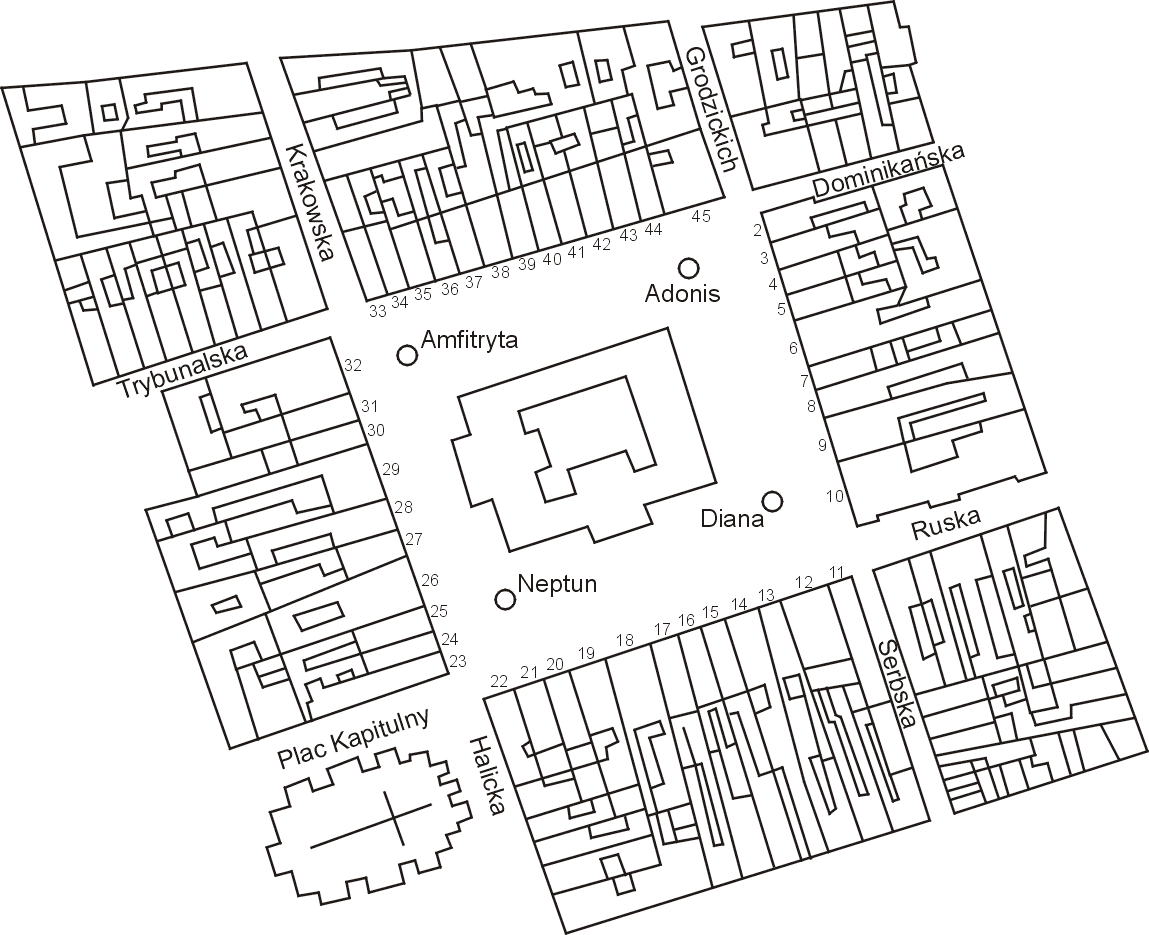
Plan of the square

Market Square (Ukrainian: Площа Ринок, romanized: Ploshcha Rynok, Polish: Rynek we Lwowie, German: Ring) is a central square of the city of Lviv, Ukraine. The market square was laid out as the central square of the new city of Lviv, founded in the mid-14th century by the Polish king Casimir III the Great to the south of the old Lviv.

The square is rectangular in shape, with measurements of 142 metres by 129 metres and with two streets radiating out of every corner. In the middle there was a row of houses, with its southern wall made by the Town Hall. However, when in 1825 the tower of the Town Hall burned, all adjacent houses were demolished and a new hall, with a 65-metre tower, was built in 1835 by architects J. Markl and F. Trescher.

Around the square, there are 44 tenement houses, which represent several architectural styles, from Renaissance to Modernism. In the four corners, there are fountains—wells from 1793, probably designed by Hartman Witwer. The sculptures represent four Greek mythological figures: Neptune, Diana, Amphitrite and Adonis. In front of the Town Hall, there was a pillory. In 1998 the Market Place, together with the historic city center of Lviv, was recognised as a UNESCO world heritage site.

== History ==
The square was designed soon after Lviv’s location as a city. Originally, the buildings were Gothic; however, a great fire on 3 June 1527 destroyed most of the city. The new city, then known in Polish as Lwów, was rebuilt in Renaissance style, with a few remaining examples of Gothic architecture. There is a vault in tenement house number 24 and a portal in house number 25. Market Square was witness to several important events in the history of Poland and Ukraine. Among these, in 1387 King Wladyslaw Jagiello accepted the homage of Petru I of Moldavia here. In 1436 another Moldavian ruler, Ilias of Moldavia, paid homage to King Wladyslaw III in Lviv. Also, at the pillory, several historical figures were executed by the Polish authorities including rulers of Moldavia Ştefan Tomşa (1564), Ukrainian national hero Ioan Potcoavă (Ivan Pidkova) (1578) and Iancu Sasul (1582).

In 1848, during the Spring of Nations, a Polish National Guard was formed here. On 11 November 1920, prime minister Jozef Pilsudski hosted a military parade to commemorate awarding the Virtuti Militari cross to the city. Also, on 30 June 1941, Yaroslav Stetsko proclaimed Ukraine's independence in a house located on the square. In 2006, a major restoration of the square’s pavement was carried out.

== Houses ==
=== Eastern side ===
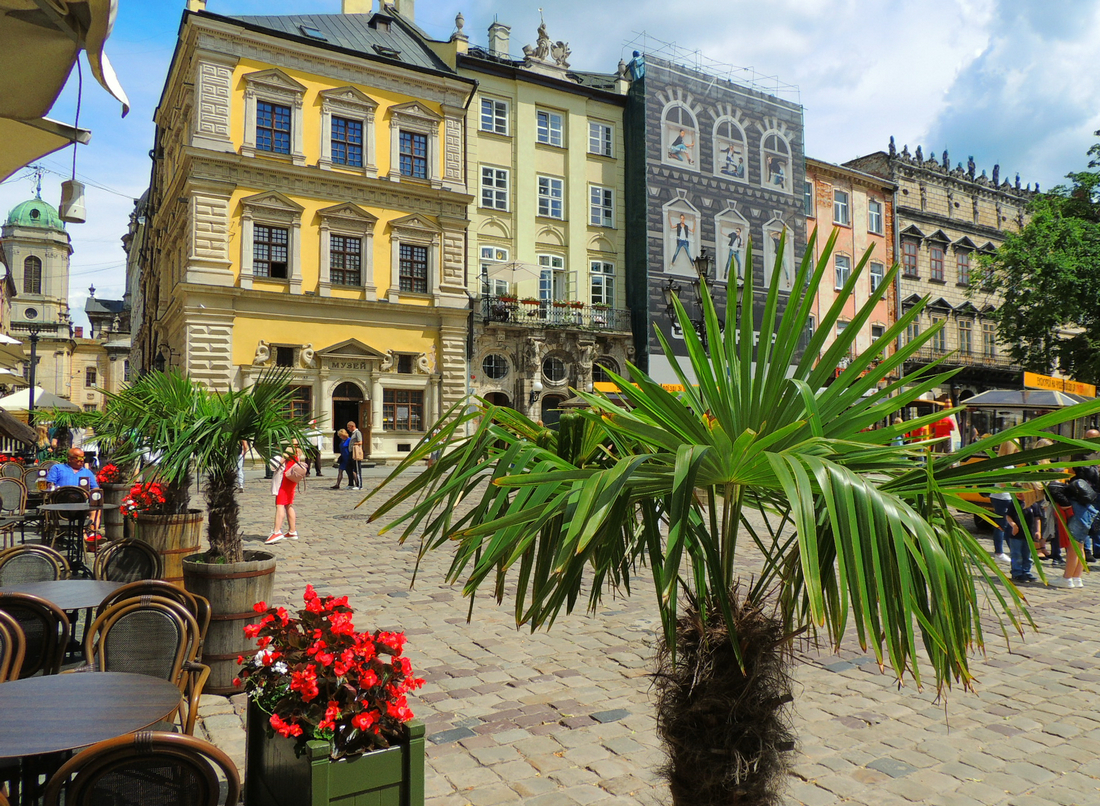
Eastern side

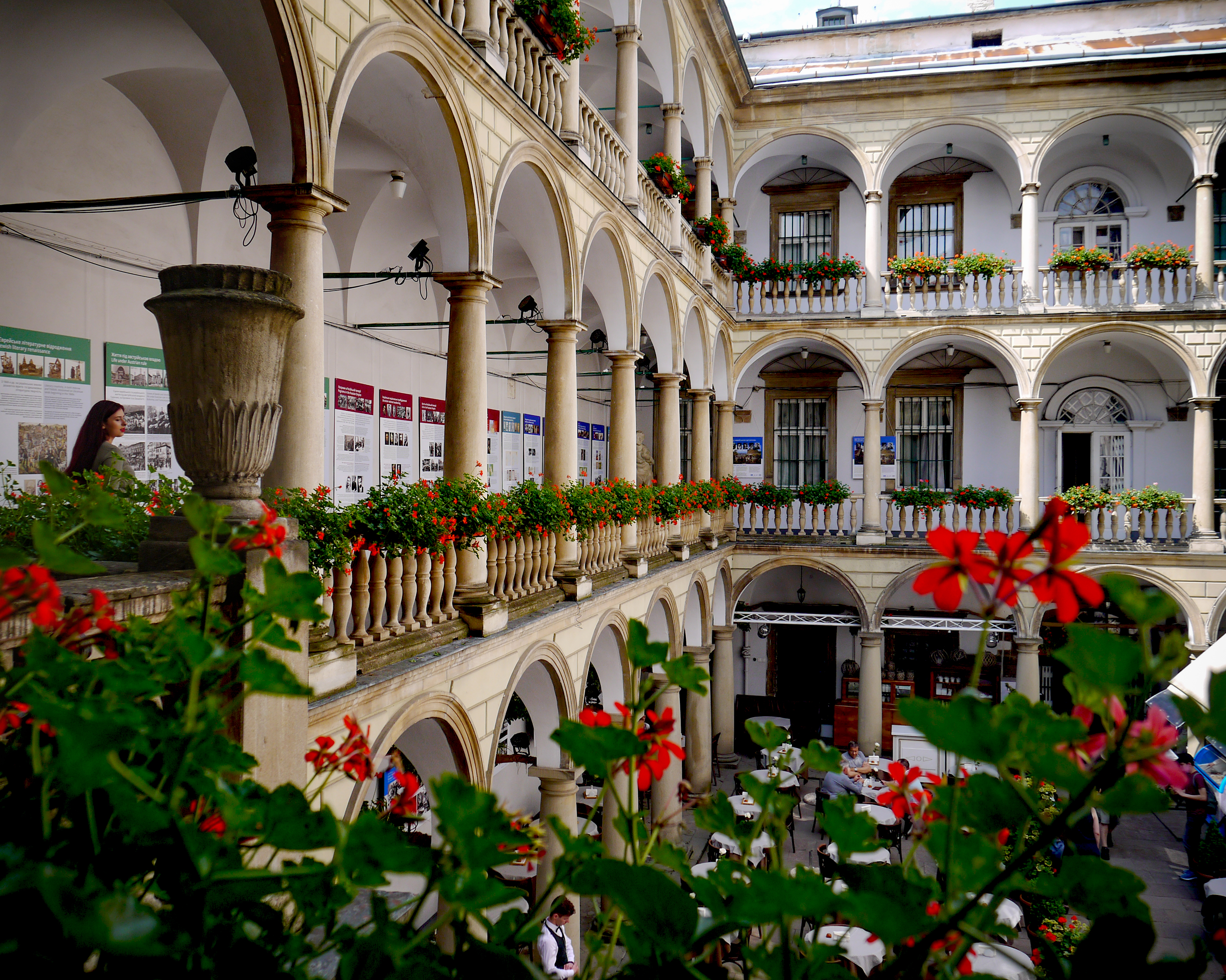
Court of the Korniakt Palace

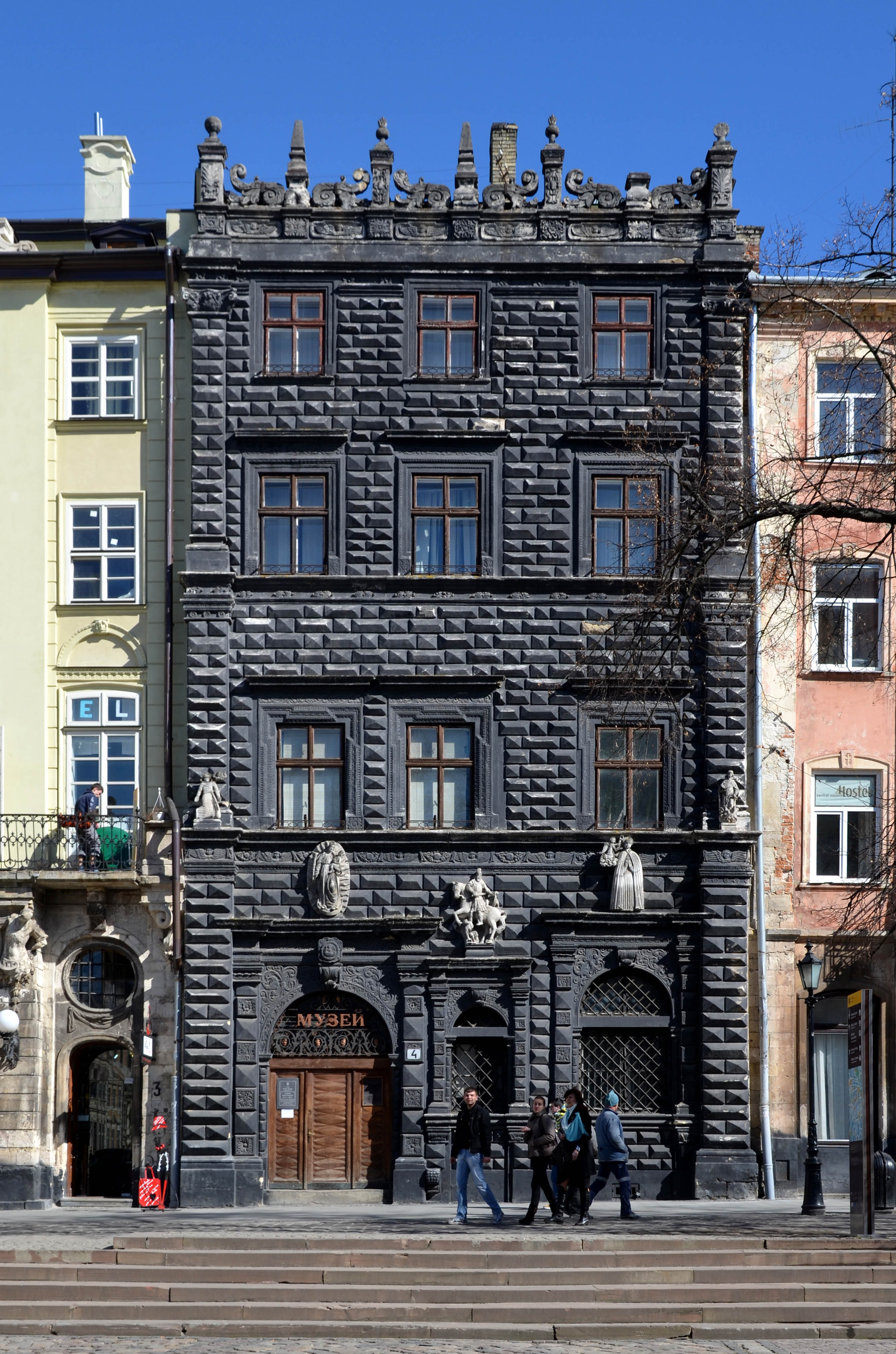
Black House, Lviv

- Number 2. Bandinelli Palace. Built in late Renaissance style in 1593. It was the property of Roberto Bandinelli from Florence, who founded the first mail office in Lviv in 1629. Remodelled in 1737–1739, after World War II it was in ruins. Recently renovated. Among people who lived here, there was a Polish poet Kornel Ujejski.
- Number 3. House of the Wilczek family. A Rococo-style house, remodelled between 1771 and 1772. It owes its name to its first owners.
- Number 4. Black House. One of the most famous buildings on the square and one of the most beautiful examples of renaissance architecture in Lviv. It was built at the end of the 16th century for Italian tax-collector Tomas Alberti. The front elevation of the house is made of sandstone, which has darkened through the years, making it architecturally significant. Since 1926 it has been part of the Historic City Museum.
- Number 5. House of Lukasiewicz. Built in the 16th century by Piotr Krasowski.
- Number 6. King John III Sobieski Palace, also called Little Wawel. It was originally built in 1580 for a Greek merchant Konstanty Korniakt, which is why it is sometimes called The Palace of the Korniakts. In 1640, it was purchased by Jakub Sobieski and inherited by King John III Sobieski. The Polish-Lithuanian ruler remodelled it into a palace-style residence, with spacious rooms and an audience hall. Sobieski’s house is made of two earlier, Gothic buildings joined together. Since 1908, a historical museum of the city has been located here. It is now part of the Lviv History Museum, with the Royal Chambers. They preserve and exhibit historical valuables: 18th-century furniture and clocks, silver artefacts, a collection of decorations, medals, and other items. Apart from Sobieski, another Polish king stayed here, Wladyslaw IV Vasa, who in 1634 was infected with smallpox and recovered here.
- Number 7. House of Szembek. In the niche, there is a 16th/17th century figure of Mary, mother of Jesus.
- Number 8. House of Bernatowicz, with an Empire style facade.
- Number 9. Archbishop’s Palace. It was property of Lviv Roman Catholic Archbishops. Among its guests, there were several Polish kings and nobles. In 1634 it was thoroughly remodelled by Archbishop Stanisław Grochowski. King Michał Korybut Wiśniowiecki. died here on 10 November 1673. In 1845, a second floor was added and the house was turned into a condominium. Polish kings Sigismund III Vasa and his son Władysław IV stayed here while in Lviv.
- Number 10. Lubomirski Palace or House of Prosvita. Rococo style, created in 1763 by architect Jan de Witte, for Stanisław Lubomirski, out of two previously existing buildings. Between 1771 and 1821, it was seat of Austrian governors of Galicia. In the mid-19th century, it was purchased by a Ukrainian organization, Prosvita. Here, on 30 June 1941, Yaroslav Stetsko proclaimed Ukraine's independence. Currently, there is an exhibition of china in the palace.

=== Southern side ===
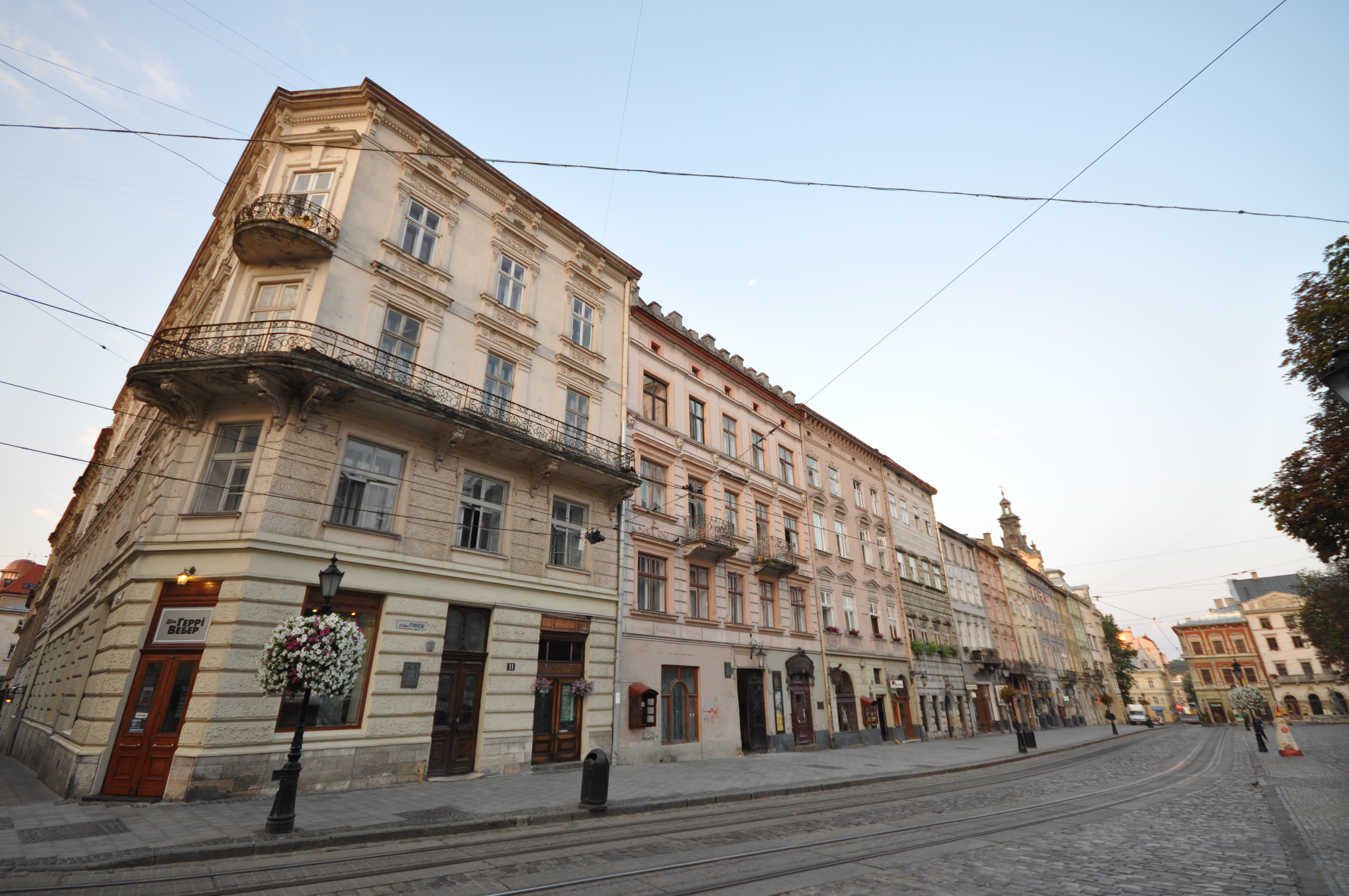
Southern side of the square

- Number 11. A 19th-century house, build on the site of an earlier one.
- Number 12. Justglac House, with mascarons presenting faces of the Sarmatians in the attic (see: Sarmatism).
- Number 13
- Number 14. Venetian House. A Renaissance-style, remodelled by Paweł Rzymianin for a consul of Venice, Antonio Massari. On the front wall, there is a stone lion of Mark the Evangelist, a coat of arms of Republic of Venice and the date 1600.
- Number 15
- Number 16. Mieszkowski House. Rococo style, with a Gothic portal.
- Number 17. Wening House. Rococo style, with main office of the Association of Polish Culture of the Lviv Land located here.
- Number 18. Gutteter House, also called Pharmacy under the Golden Deer. Rococo style, built in 1533 and remodelled in 1785. It used to be called the prettiest tenement house in the city.
- Number 19
- Number 20. House Under the Lion
- Number 21. House of the Ubaldinis. Built in the 16th century, it belonged to a rich émigré from Florence, Ripo Ubaldini. Among persons who lived here, there is Jerzy Michotek, who wrote a popular song, Only in Lwów.
- Number 22. A 19th-century house, built on the site of an earlier one.

=== Western side ===
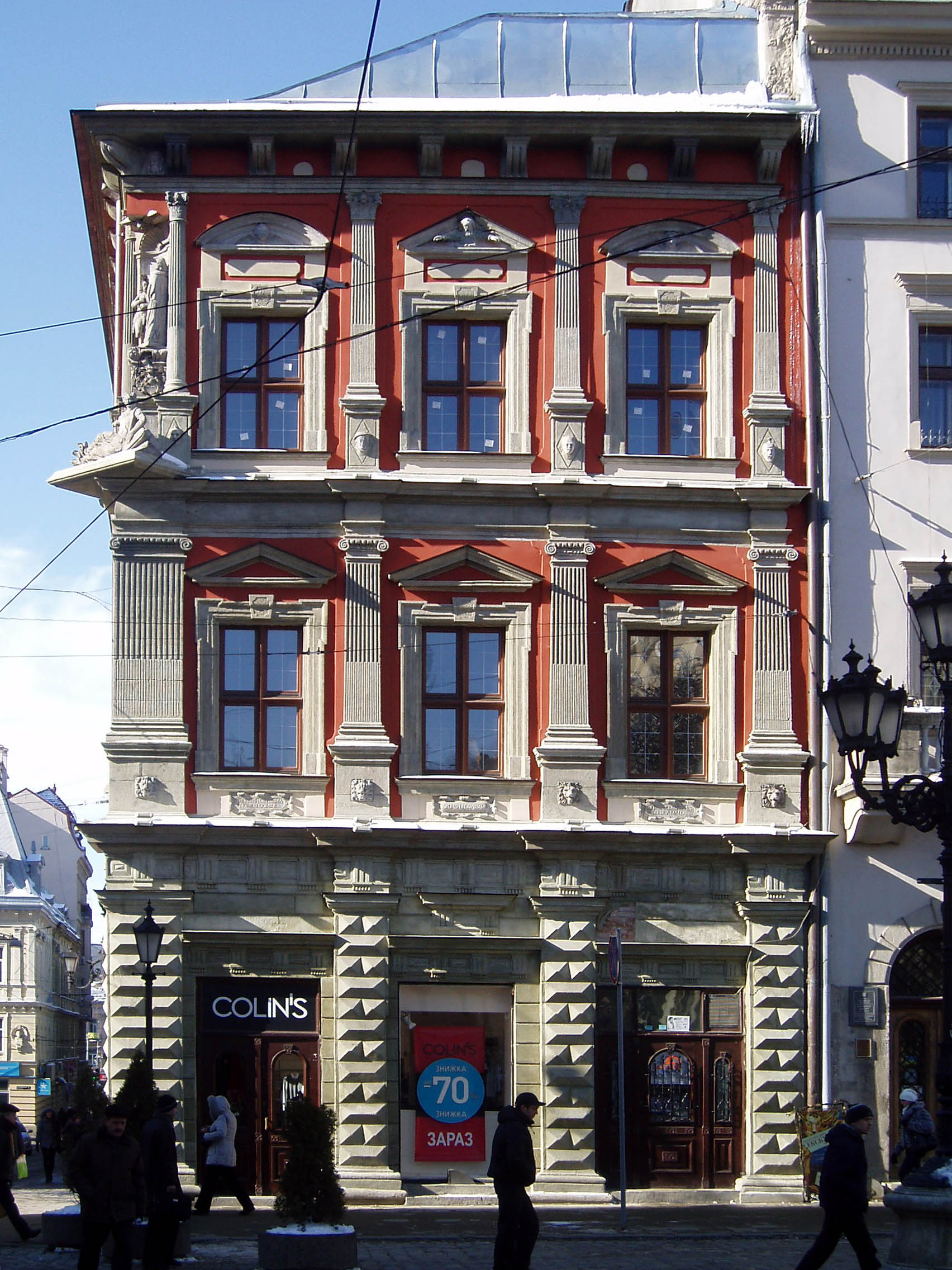
Scholz-Wolf House at Nr. 23

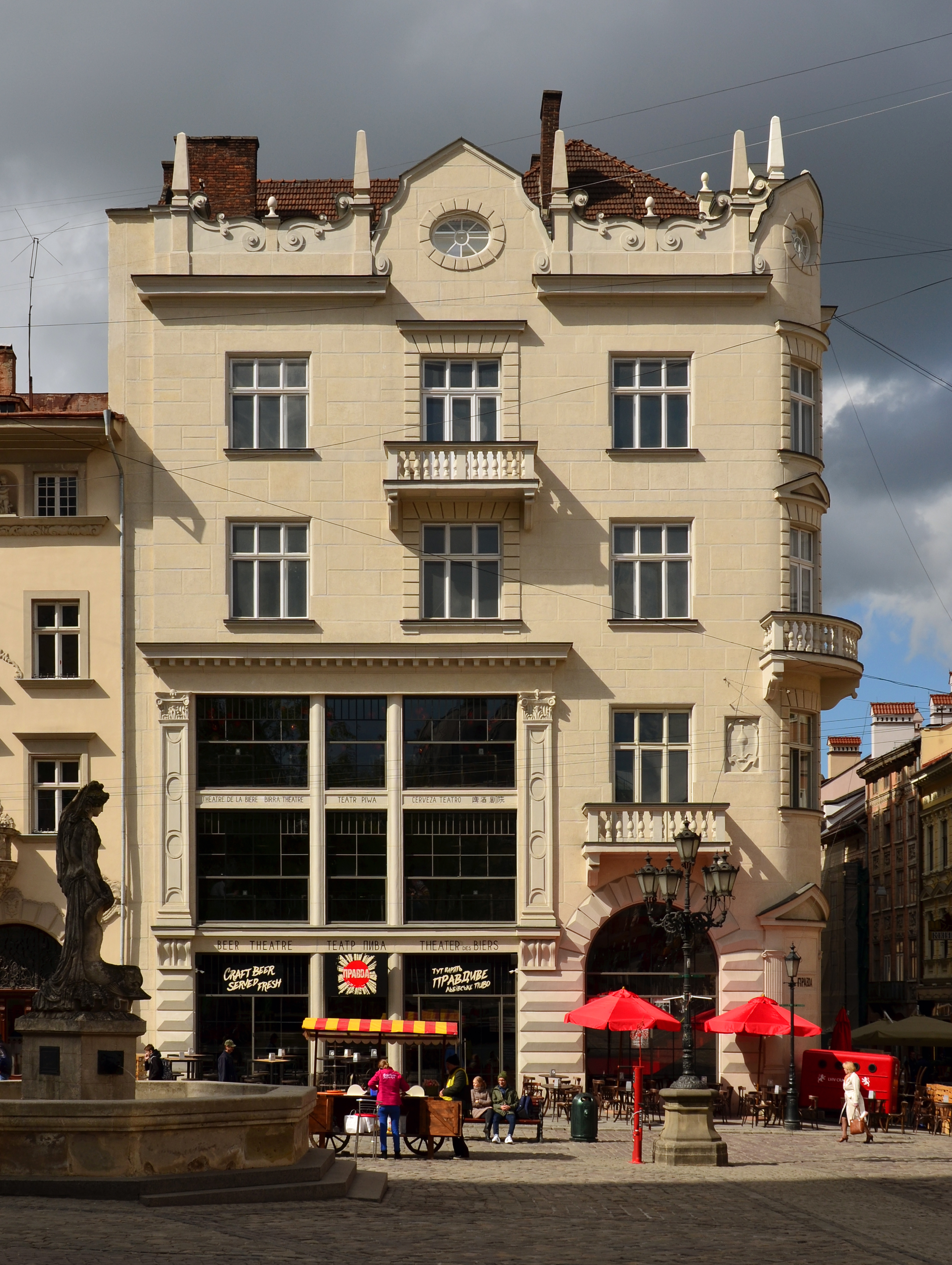
Zipper Family House at Nr. 32

- Number 23. Scholz-Wolf House. Renaissance style, built in 1570 for the Scholz-Wolf family, which came to Lviv from Silesia. It is richly decorated; on the second floor there is a sculpture Baptism of Christ, probably by Herman von Hutte or Sebastian Czeszko. In this house, among others, lived a renowned 17th century Polish poet, Szymon Szymonowic.
- Number 24. House of Giebl. Renaissance style, remodelled in 1920 in a modernistic style. Here, in 1707, stayed Russian tsar Peter the Great.
- Number 25. In the interbellum period, a Milikowski bookstore was located in this Rococo house.
- Number 26
- Number 27
- Number 28. Heppner House. Renaissance, built in 1510. It belonged to a doctor and member of the city council, Pawel Heppner. The house is known for its numerous lions, with as many as 20 of them.
- Number 29. The Palace of Felicjan Korytkowski, together with Andreolli’s covered way. Empire style, built on the site of the House of Zimorowicz, demolished in 1790.
- Number 30. House of Jakub Reguła. Rococo-style.
- Number 31. Mazanczow House. Built in 1714 in a late Renaissance style, it belonged to the Baczewski family before the First and Second World War. The store that sold J. A. Baczewski spirits was located on the ground floor. Its art-deco façade was designed in the 1920s by architect Bronislaw Wiktor, the sculptural work is by Sigmund Kurczynski.
- Number 32. Zipper Family House . A fusion of Modernism and Polish Renaissance, built in 1923 on the site of an earlier house.

=== Northern side ===
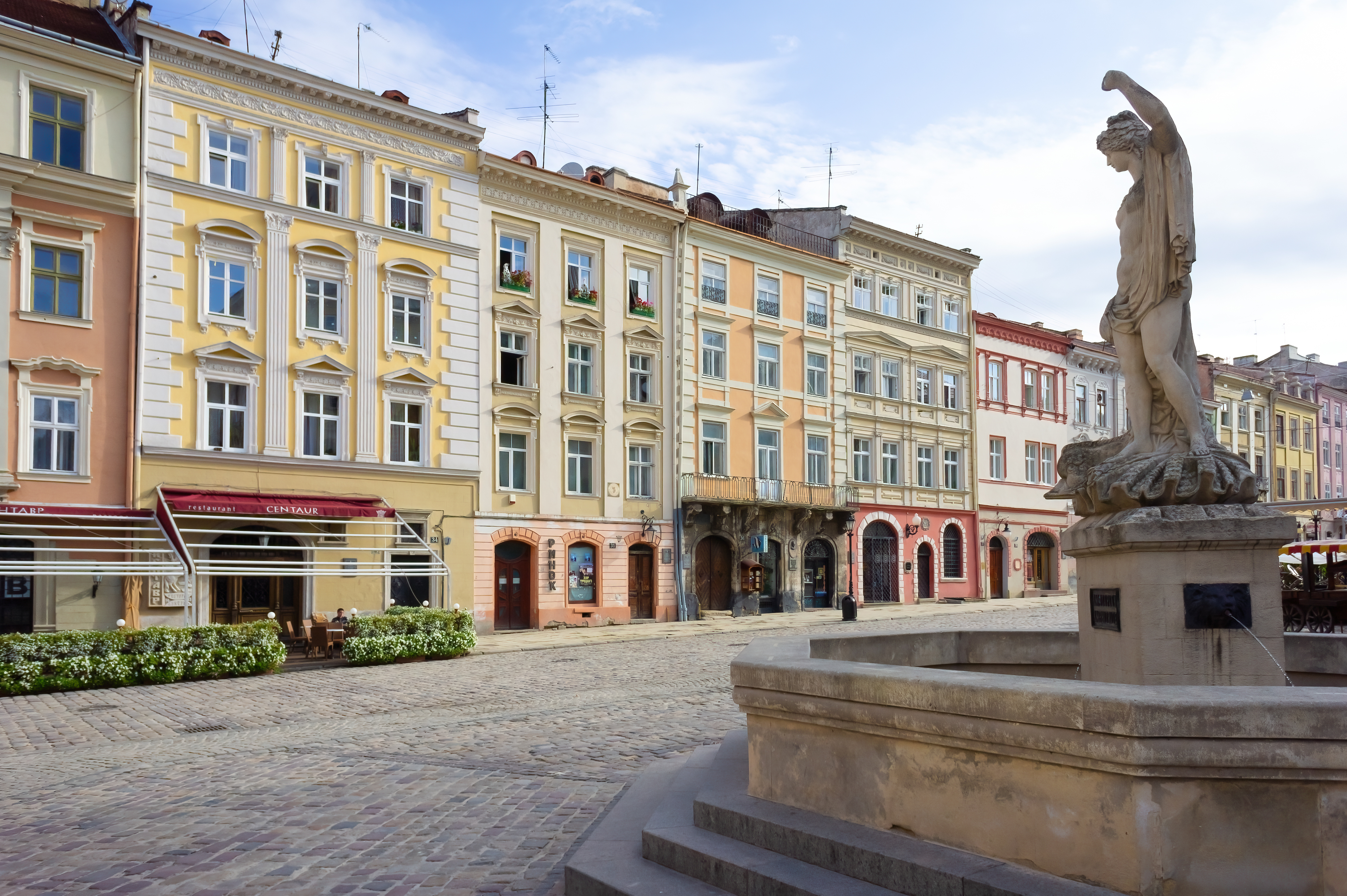
View of the northwestern corner of Rynok Square

- Number 33
- Number 34
- Number 35
- Number 36. House of the Gielazyns. Built in 1778. Among its residents, there is Prince Jozef Poniatowski, who lived here in 1784–1785.
- Number 37. House of Marcin Gronswajer. Gronswajer was mayor of the city during the Khmelnytsky Uprising.
- Number 38
- Number 39. Formerly a mint.
- Number 40. Boim Family House. Remodelled in late Baroque style in 1771.
- Number 41 Rococo style.
- Number 42
- Number 43
- Number 44
- Number 45. Under the Deer. Built in 1790. In the interbellum period, a popular Atlas Coffehouse was located here. It was a meeting place of local artists, such as Marian Hemar, Bruno Schulz, Jan Kasprowicz and Jozef Wittlin. Here, in 1924, Adam Hanuszkiewicz was born.

== Statues and fountains ==
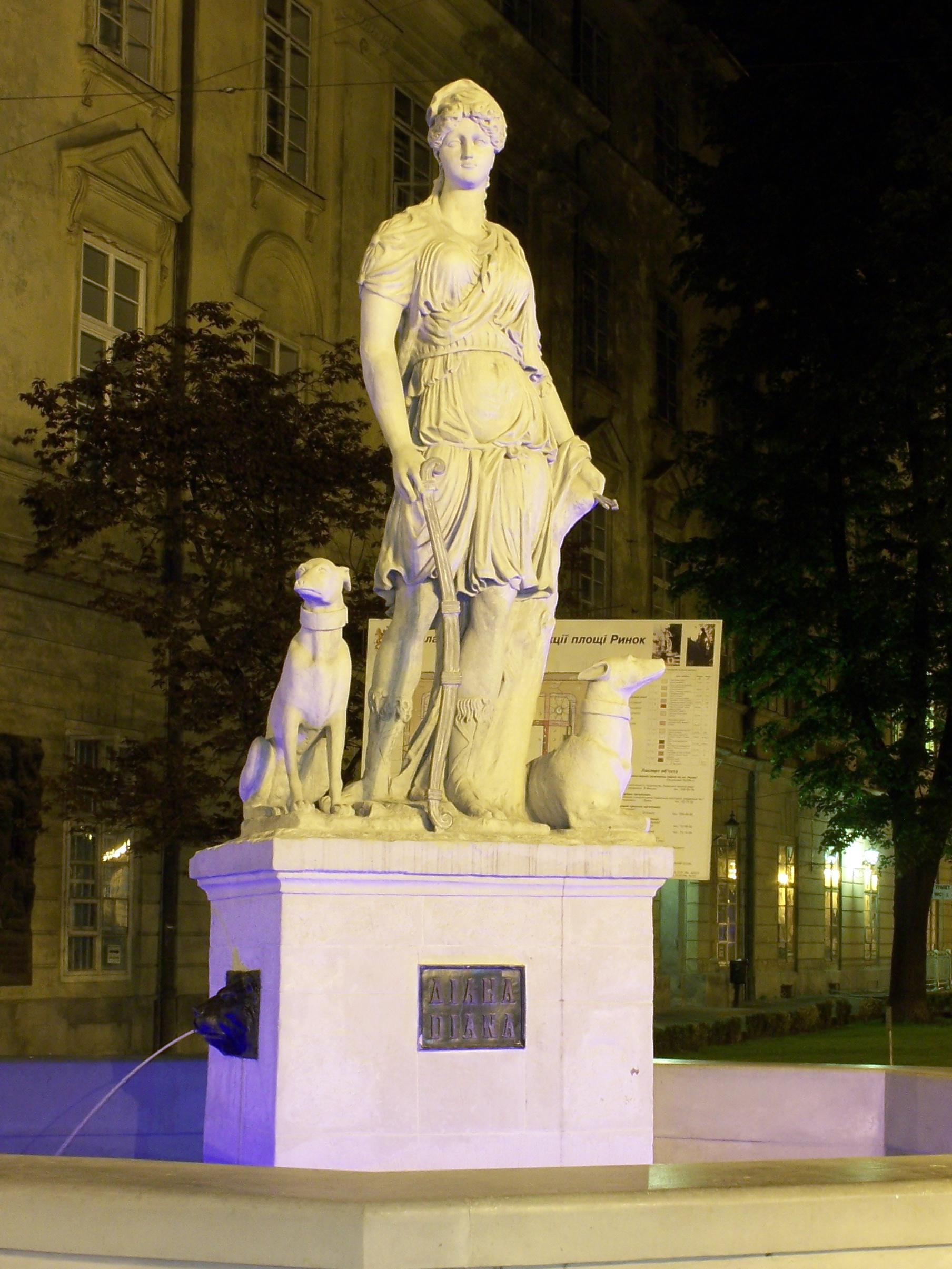
Diana

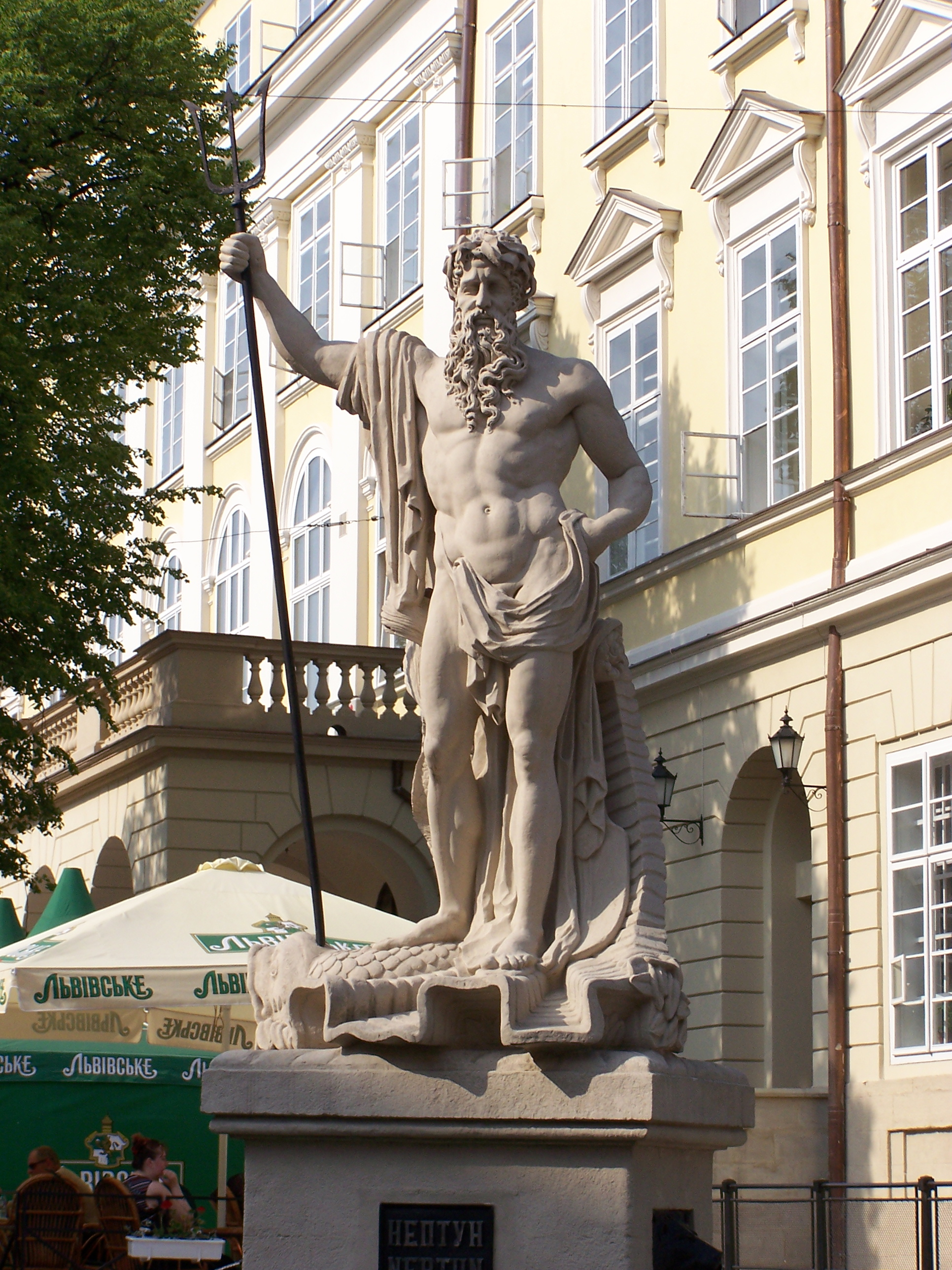
Neptune

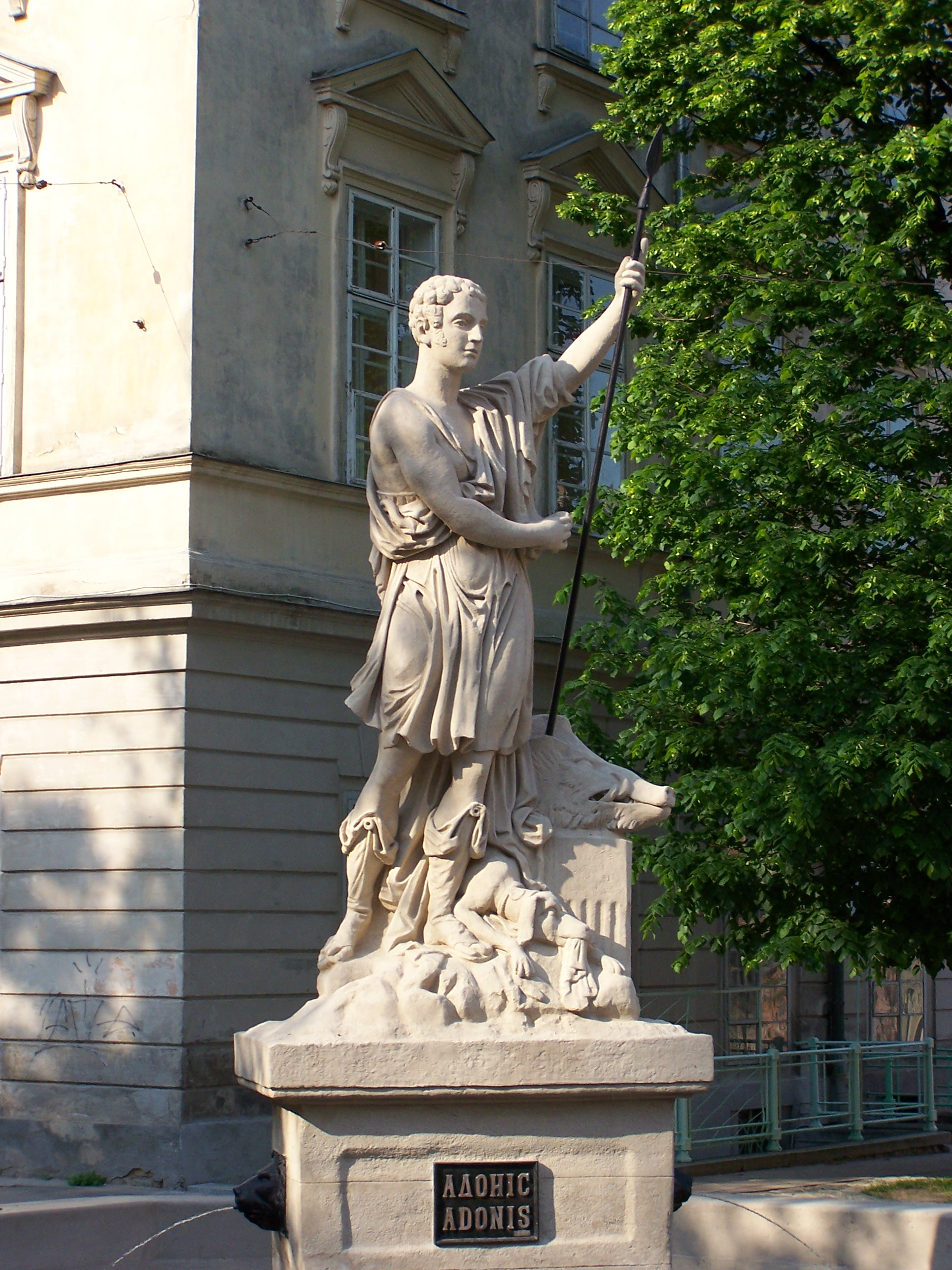
Adonis

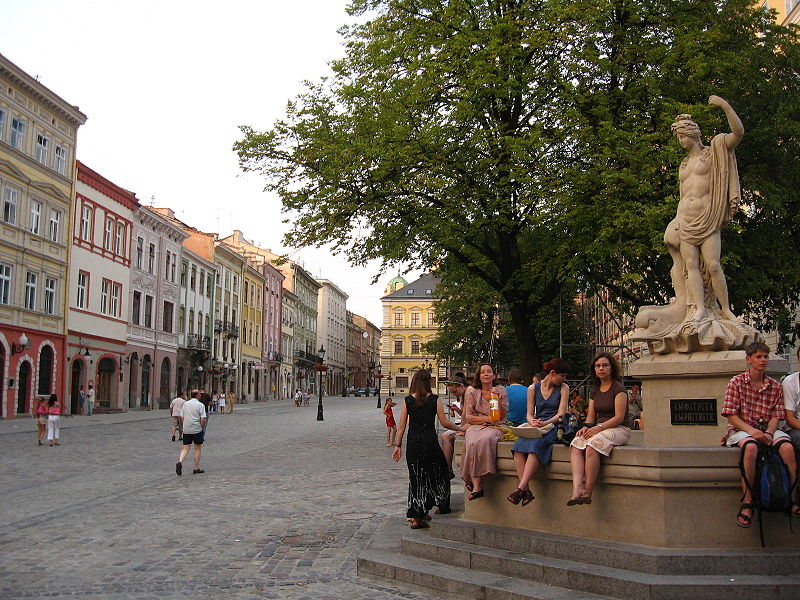
Amphitrite

== See also ==
- Old Market Square in Lviv
- List of streets of Lviv
