= Gesser =

Gesser is a surname of South German origin. Notable people with the surname include:

- Bella Gesser, Israeli chess player
- Jason Gesser (born 1979), American football player and coach
- Samuel Gesser (1930–2008), Canadian record producer
