= J. A. Baczewski =

Polish liquor producer

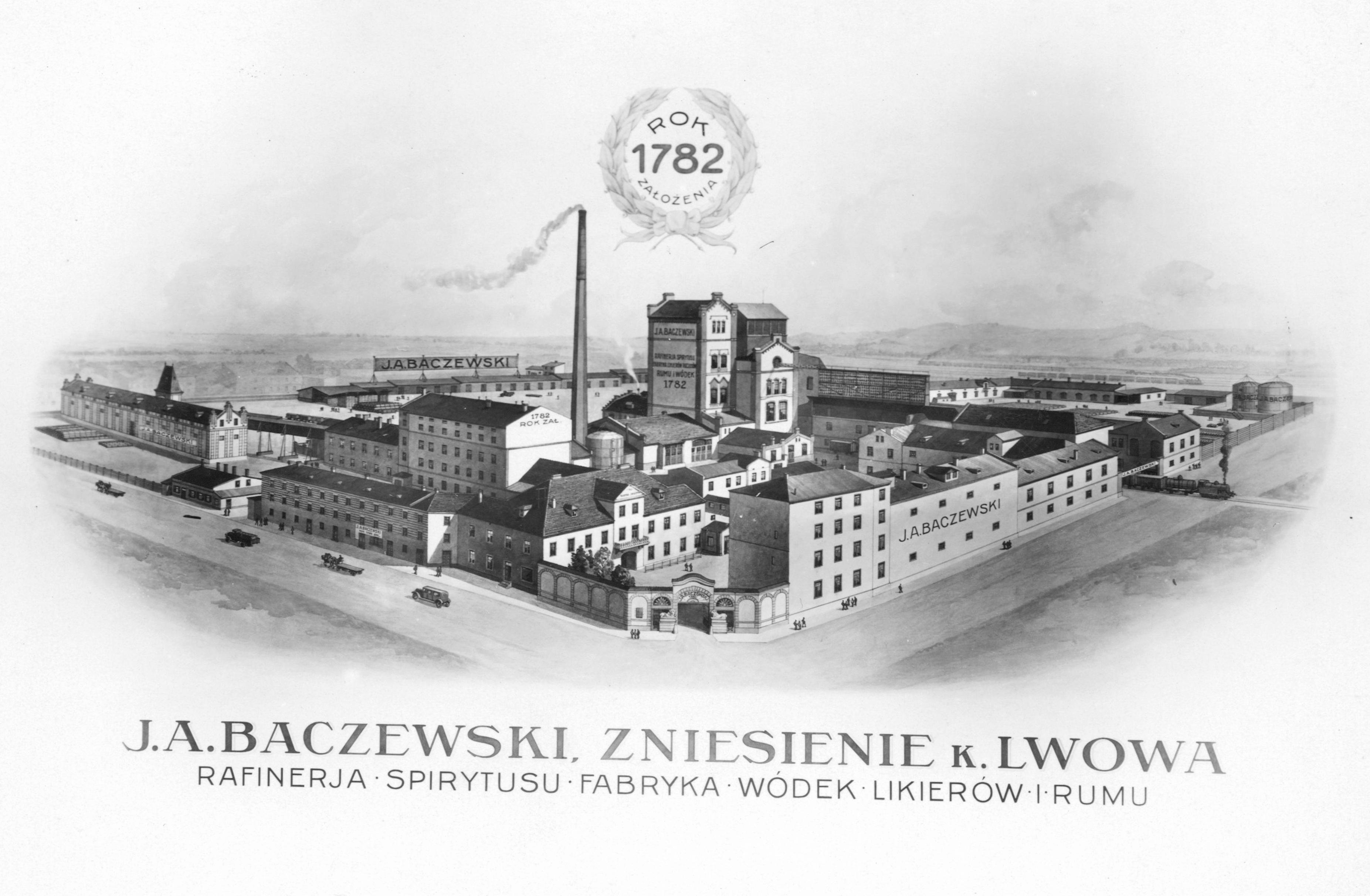
Baczewski factory

J. A. Baczewski was a Polish company best known for its alcoholic beverages such as vodka and gin. The factory, dating back to the late 18th century, was based in Lwów (Lviv) and until 1939 was one of two most popular Polish export goods. It is the oldest Polish vodka brand still in production.

== History ==
In 1782, a distillery was founded in Wybranówka, Lwów by Jewish merchant Lejb Beczeles (Baczewski). It is recognized as the oldest Polish distillery. In 1810 a small, local spirits factory was inherited by the founder's son, Leopold Maksymilian Baczewski, who moved the firm to another of Lwów's suburbs, Zniesienie. The suburb was soon swallowed by the fast-growing metropolis and the factory at Żółkiewska Street started to grow rapidly. The family business was one of four distilleries in Lwów, but it was remarkable for introduction of new technologies. It introduced a double rectification process only two years after Aeneas Coffey invented it. The liqueurs, rosolises and vodkas produced with this technology were much more smooth and clear than most of other brands, which gave the company large popularity, not only in the city, but also in other parts of the Austrian Empire. Baczewski was a purveyor to the imperial court in Vienna. As a result, the owners were given by the imperial court the prestigious Imperial and Royal Warrant of Appointment ("Ces. i Król. dostawca Dworu").

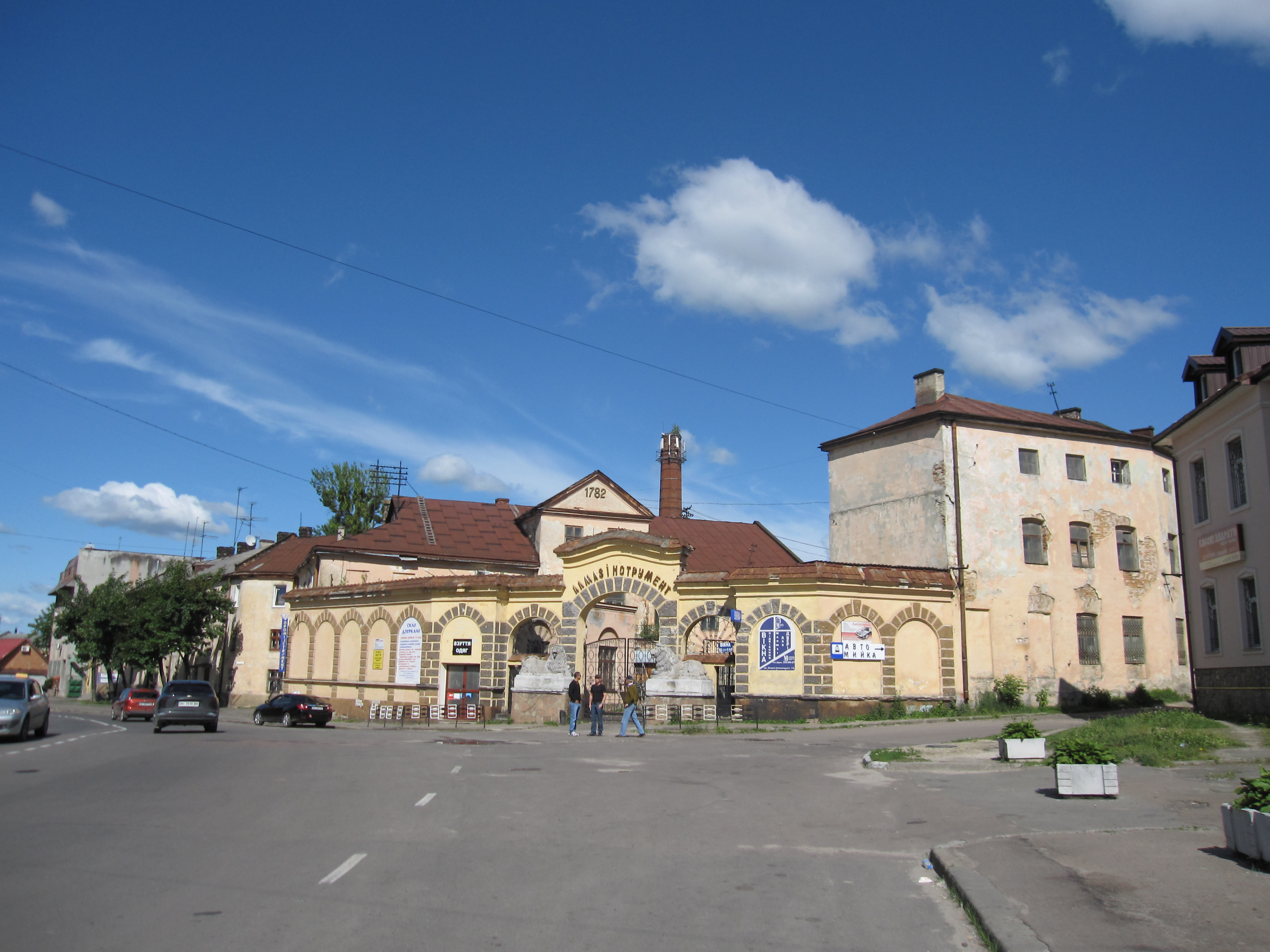
Former J. A. Baczewski factory in Lviv

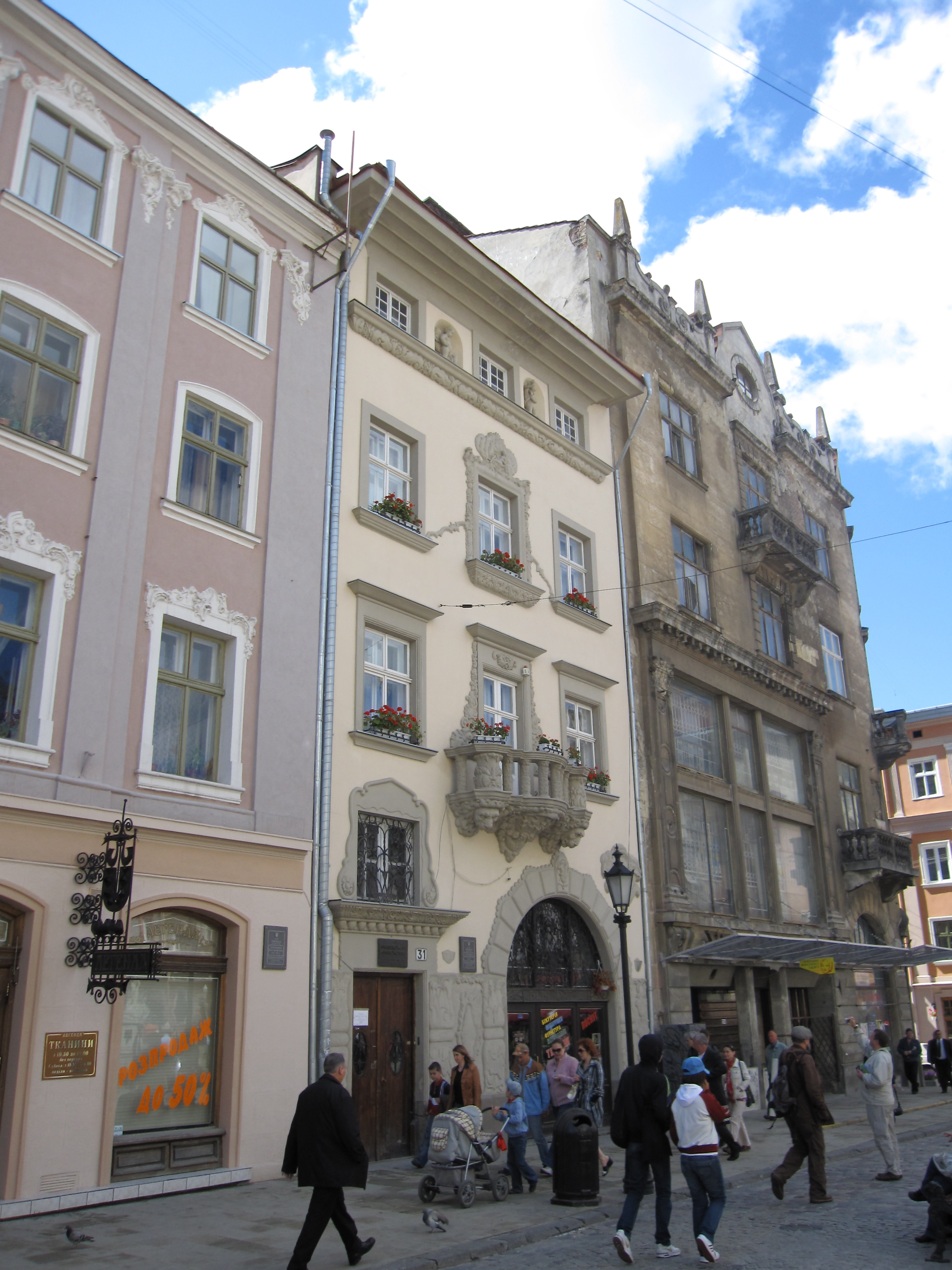
The Mazanczow House (middle) on the market square of Lviv Nr. 31 was the family's residence with a shop on the ground floor before the First and Second World War. It was renovated in 1923 by Bronislaw Viktor, the sculptural work is by Sigmund Kurczynski.

At the end of the 19th century, the firm was inherited by the founder's great grandson, Józef Adam Baczewski. A graduate of Lwów University of Technology and a specialist in spirits technology, Józef Adam refurbished and significantly expanded the factory. He also bought new production lines in France, the Netherlands and built a new refinery. He also started to export Polish spirits to other European countries, including France, United Kingdom, Italy and Germany. This started the popularity of Polish vodka abroad. Józef Adam was one of the first businessmen in Central Europe to introduce marketing on a large scale. To distinguish his vodkas and liqueurs from other brands available to Europeans, he ordered all export spirits to be sold in crystal carafe rather than bottles. With time all Baczewski's bottles were turned into carafes as well. In 1894, during the National Fair in Lwów, the carafe-shaped pavilion of J.A. Baczewski company was chosen as the most interesting exhibition - and the most visited. The marketing strategy also included advertisement in press, on leaflets and posters.

After Józef Adam's death in 1911, the firm was inherited by two of his sons, Leopold and Henryk. The former was a graduate of the Chemical Faculty of the Vienna University and took over the production while the latter was a lawyer and continued their father's active marketing strategy. They also introduced new brands, until their times sold only locally. When Poland regained her independence in 1918, the company had a well-established name and the brothers decided to stay with their father's name rather than change it to include their own name. The popularity of the spirits was so great that in many Polish books and poems of the epoch, the brand "Baczewski" was used as a synonym to "vodka."

=== During World War II ===
In the Interbellum the company was run by Leopold's son, Stefan Baczewski. He decided not to increase the volume of production to preserve the prices and the quality. To promote the most luxurious of the products, Stefan also signed contracts with two of the Polish trans-Atlantic ocean liners, the M/S Piłsudski and M/S Polonia. He was also the first spirits producer to transport his products by plane on a daily basis. Since the 1930s the liquors from Lwów were shipped to Paris, Vienna and Prague by plane. In an interesting example of marketing, some of the clear 40% vodkas produced by J.A. Baczewski company were labelled with the brand and a small slogan saying that "the only vodka of comparable quality is produced by Pierre Smirnoff of Russia." The Lwów-based Smirnoff factory introduced a series of similar labels. Baczewski distillery was the leading and most popular Polish distilleries in terms of quality and reputation. Its two flagship products were Monopolowa and Perła.

After the outbreak of the Polish Defensive War of 1939, the factory was bombed by the Luftwaffe during the Battle of Lwów. After the city was seized by the Soviet Union, the remnants were levelled to the ground and an emery paper factory was built in its place. However, the brand continued to live as a synonym of quality. Its popularity was maintained by many notable writers and poets of the epoch, including Marian Hemar and Feliks Konarski (Ref-Ren). Last bottles of Baczewski's spirits were sold for huge prices even 30 years after the war.

=== Modern times ===
After the Second World War, Eduard Gessler, the owner of the "Altvater Gessler" company in Vienna, Austria, distantly related to the Baczewski family, reacquired the J. A. Baczewski mark. Under Eduard Gessler’s guidance, Gessler and J. A. Baczewski united under the combined name "Altvater Gessler - J. A. Baczewski", with its principal place of business in Vienna, Austria.

The reconstituted company continued to specialize in quality alcoholic products for domestic consumption in Austria and for export to various countries in various continents, to include Australia, Africa, Asia, Europe and North America, most notably the United States. Its centuries old reputation and record of quality led to its being selected as the only representative of the Austrian liquor industry at the International World Fair in Chicago in 1950.

Eduard Gessler was responsible for the reintroduction of J. A. Baczewski Vodka "Monopolowa". Monopolowa is a distinctive potato vodka, produced of a traditional formula, imbued with a distinct intensity, smoothness, depth of flavor and complexity of character, all attributable to a “back-to-basics” tradition of being distilled from potatoes. (Vodka, native to Poland, Estonia, Latvia, Lithuania, as well as Russia, was traditionally assumed to be made from potatoes. Presently, most other vodkas are produced from grain.)

Following Eduard Gessler’s death in 1979, his son Elek Gessler consolidated the affairs of both traditional companies into one new legal entity in 1980, which to this day is known as "Altvater Gessler - J. A. Baczewski GmbH”, an Austrian corporation. In 1983, Elek Gessler established "Altvater Gessler - J. A. Baczewski International (USA) Inc.", a New Jersey corporation, to manage United States operations. To this date, both companies are owned solely by the Gessler family.

After the fall of communism in Poland in 1989, the Starogard Gdański-based branch of the Polmos company started to produce several of J. A. Baczewski's products under license from Altvater Gessler - J. A. Baczewski International (USA) Inc. However, in the late 1990s the license was terminated and production in Poland was halted.

To this date the "J. A. Baczewski" trademark is owned by Altvater Gessler - J. A. Baczewski International (USA) Inc.

== Notable products ==
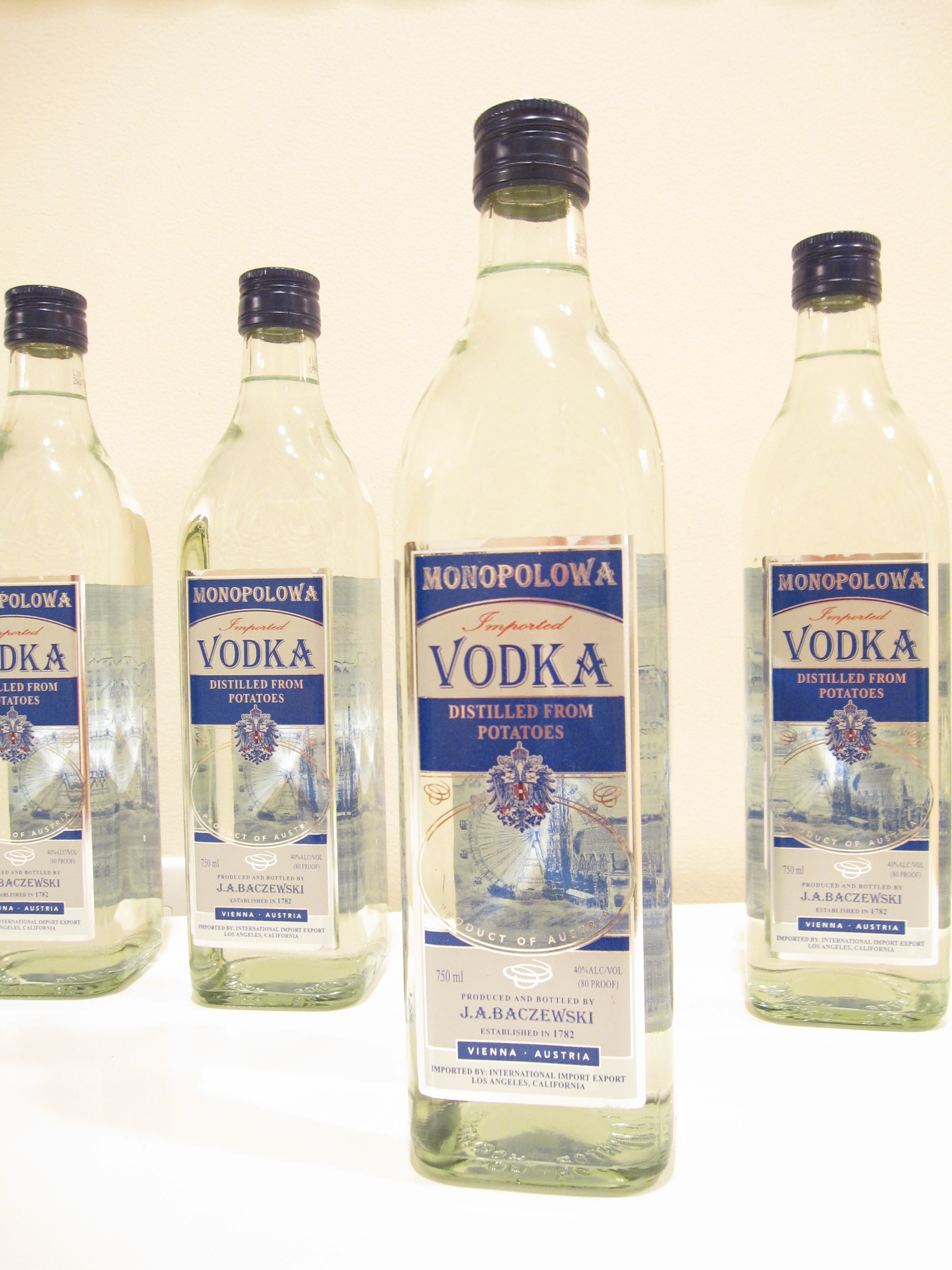
Modern Monopolowa bottles

- Souverain
- Perła
- Bernardine Imperiale
- Cherry
- Krupnik
- Rosolis
- Monopolowa Vodka
