= Timeline of Lviv =

History of Lviv, Ukraine

The following is a timeline of the history of the city of Lviv, Ukraine.

== Prior to 18th century ==
Historical affiliations

Golden Horde c. 1256–1340
∟ Kingdom of Galicia–Volhynia c. 1256–1340
Kingdom of Poland 1340–1569
Polish–Lithuanian Commonwealth 1569–1772
Austria/A-H Empire 1772–1918
West Ukrainian People's Republic 1918
Republic of Poland 1918–1939
Soviet Union 1939–1941 (occupation)
∟ Ukrainian SSR 1939–1941
Nazi Germany 1941–1944 (occupation)
∟ General Government 1941–1944
Soviet Union 1944–1991
∟ Ukrainian SSR 1944–1991
Ukraine 1991–present

- 1256 - Lviv mentioned in the Galician–Volhynian Chronicle.
- 1272 - Leo I of Galicia relocates Galicia-Volhynia capital to Lviv from Halych (approximate date).
- 1340 - Town taken by forces of Casimir III of Poland.
- 1356 - Town rights granted.
- 1362 - High Castle rebuilt.
- 1363 - Armenian church built.
- 1365 - Roman Catholic Diocese of Lwów established.
- 1370 - Latin Cathedral construction begins (approximate date).
- 1387 - 27 September: Petru II of Moldavia paid homage to Polish King Władysław II Jagiełło and Queen Jadwiga of Poland making Moldavia a vassal principality of the Kingdom of Poland.
- 1412 - Catholic see established.
- 1434 - City becomes capital of the Polish Ruthenian Voivodeship.
- 1480 - Latin Cathedral construction completed.
- 1527 - Lviv fire of 1527.
- 1550 - Church of St. Onuphrius built.
- 1556 - Arsenal built.
- 1580 - Korniakt Palace built on Market Square.
- 1582 - Karaite synagogue built.
- 1586 - Ukrainian Lviv Dormition Brotherhood established.
- 1589 - Bandinelli Palace built on Market Square.
- 1593 - Printing press in operation.
- 1596 - Ukrainian Greek Catholic Church founded.

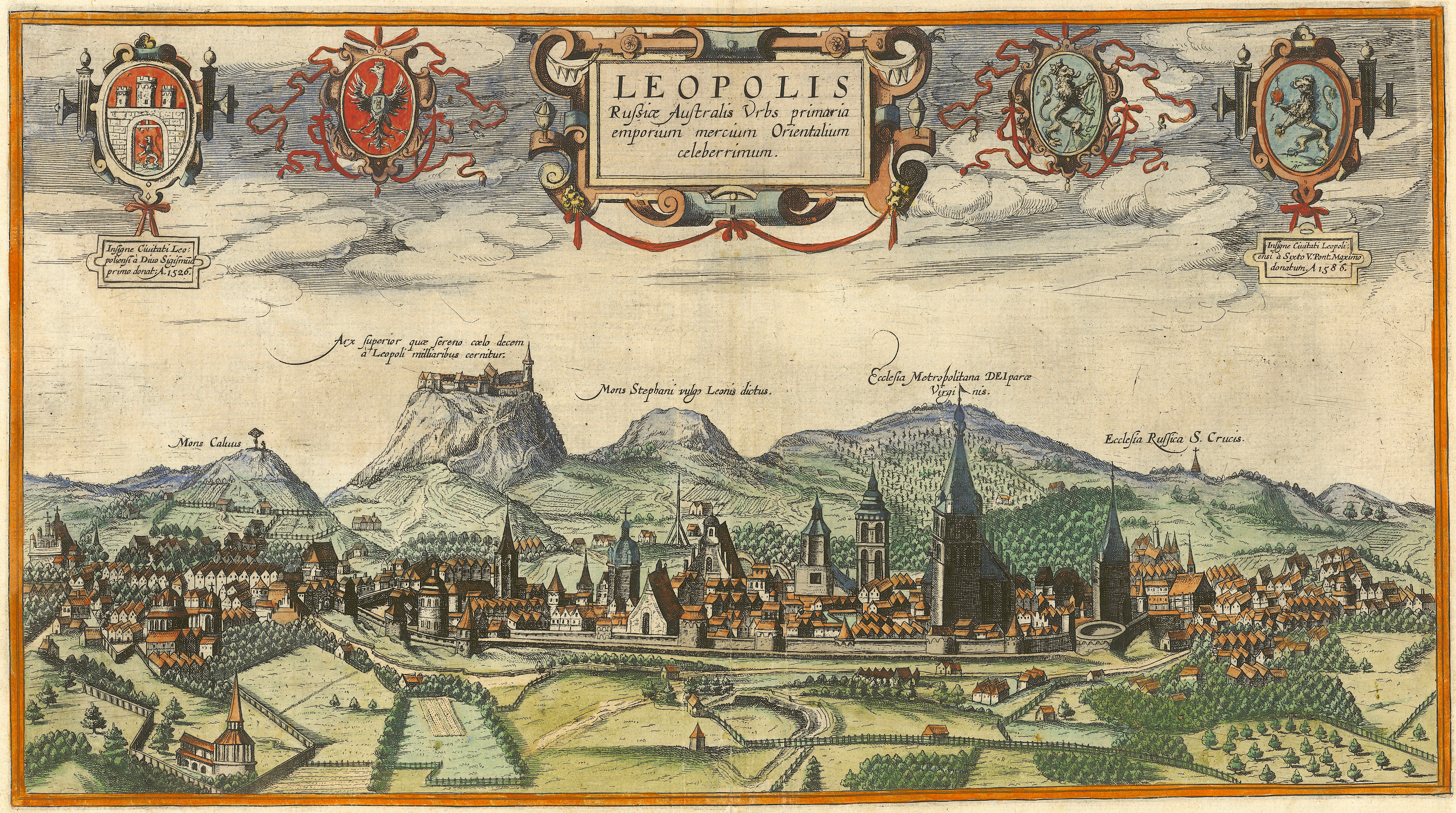
17th-century view of the city

- 1609 - Golden Rose Synagogue opens.
- 1618 - Hlyniany Gate built.
- 1626 - City becomes seat of Armenian bishopric.
- 1629 - Dormition Church built.
- 1630 - Bernardine Church and Monastery and Church of St. Mary Magdalene consecrated.
- 1648 - City besieged by Cossacks.
- 1655 - City besieged by Cossacks again.
- 1656 - Lwów Oath.
- 1661 - Jesuit Lviv University founded.
- 1672 - Siege of Lviv by Turks.
- 1675 - Battle of Lwów (1675).

== 18th–19th centuries ==
- 1704 - City besieged by forces of Charles XII of Sweden.
- 1762 - Greek Catholic St. George's Cathedral built.
- 1771 - 4th Infantry Regiment of the Polish Crown Army stationed in Lwów.
- 1772 - City annexed by Austria in the First Partition of Poland and made the capital of the newly formed Austrian Galicia under the Germanized name Lemberg.
- 1776 - Population: 29,500.
- 1784
  - Secular University established.
  - Brygidki prison in use.
- 1787 - Lychakiv Cemetery established.
- 1788 - Stauropegion Institute founded.
- 1809
  - May: 19th Polish Uhlan Regiment formed in Lwów.
  - 27 May-19 June: City taken by forces of Józef Poniatowski.
- 1810 - Gazeta Lwowska (1810-1939) newspaper begins publication.
- 1817 - Polish Ossolineum founded.
- 1825 - German designated as official administrative language.
- 1829 - Viennese Cafe in business.
- 1835 - Town Hall and Ivan Franko Park gazebo built.
- 1842 - Skarbek Theatre opens.
- 1844 - Technical Academy established.
- 1846 - Tempel Synagogue built.
- 1848
  - 2 November: City "bombarded by the Austrians."
  - Galician Dawn newspaper begins publication.
- 1850 - Chamber of Commerce founded.
- 1853
  - Ignacy Łukasiewicz invents kerosene lamp.
  - Street lighting installed.

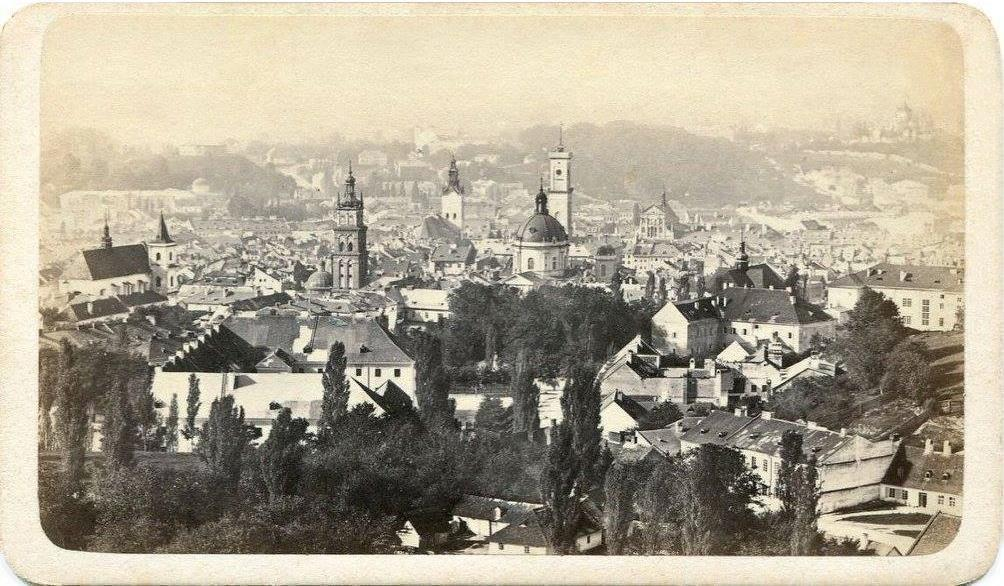
Lwów in the 1860s

- 1863 - House of Invalids built.
- 1867
  - 7 February: Polish Gymnastic Society "Sokół" founded.
  - Pravda newspaper begins publication.
- 1868 - Prosvita society founded.
- 1870
  - City self-government in effect.
  - Population: 87,105.
- 1873 - Shevchenko Scientific Society founded.
- 1877 - Industrial exhibition held.
- 1878 - Government House built.
- 1880 - Dilo newspaper begins publication.
- 1881
  - Ridna Shkola Society founded.
  - Galician Regional Diet building constructed.
- 1883 - Kurier Lwowski newspaper begins publication.
- 1890 - Population: 128,419.
- 1892 - Lychakivskyi Park laid out.
- 1893 - Grand Hotel built on Svobody Prospect.
- 1894 - Galician Regional Exhibition held.
- 1898
  - John III Sobieski Monument erected in Svobody Prospect.
  - Literaturno-naukovyi vistnyk literary-scientific journal begins publication.
- 1900
  - Grand Theatre built.
  - Population: 159,618.

== 20th century ==
=== 1900–1939 ===
- 1901 - Hotel George opens.
- 1903
  - Lechia Lwów founded as the oldest Polish football club.
  - Czarni Lwów founded as the second oldest Polish football club.
- 1904
  - Railway station opens.
  - Pogoń Lwów founded as the third oldest Polish football club.
- 1905 - Lwow Ecclesiastical Museum established.
- 1907 - Galician Music Society building constructed.
- 1908
  - 12 April: Politician Andrzej Kazimierz Potocki assassinated.
  - Polish History Museum, Lwów established.
- 1909 - Industry and Crafts College built.

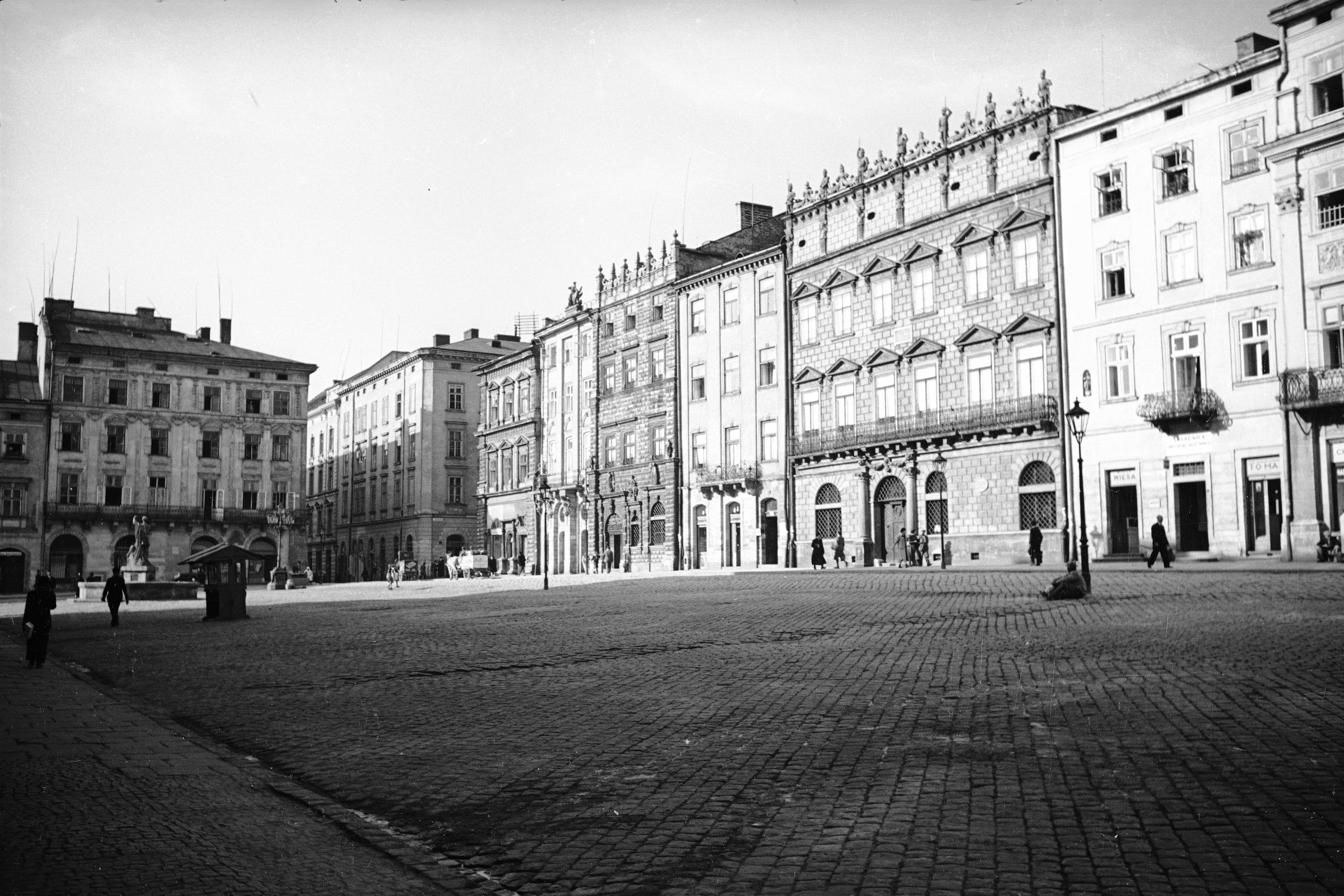
Early 20th-century view of the Market Square

- 1911 - Church of Sts. Olha and Elizabeth built.
- 1913 - Magnus department store built on Hospital Street, Lviv.
- 1914
  - 26 August-1 September: German-Russian conflict.
  - September: Russian occupation begins.
- 1915
  - May: Austrians in power.
  - 3–22 June: German-Russian conflict.
  - July: Russian occupation ends.
- 1918
  - 1 November: City becomes capital of the Western Ukrainian People's Republic; Battle of Lemberg (1918) begins.
  - 21–23 November: Lwów pogrom (1918).
  - November: Poles in power.
- 1920 - July–September: Battle of Lwów (1920).
- 1923 - City confirmed as part of Poland per Conference of Ambassadors.
- 1924 - Polish Cemetery of the Defenders of Lwów established.
- 1925 - Beis Aharon V'Yisrael Synagogue built.
- 1929 - Members of the Lwów School of Mathematics, Stefan Banach and Hugo Steinhaus, establish Studia Mathematica journal.
- 1930 - Area of city: 66 square kilometers.
- 1936
  - April 14 - demonstration of unemployed people shot by Polish police. Killed 1 worker V. Kozak.
  - April 16 - funeral of the killed worker Kozak, police fights against workers. 46 people killed.
- 1937 - Academy of Foreign Trade in Lwów established.

=== World War II (1939–1945) ===
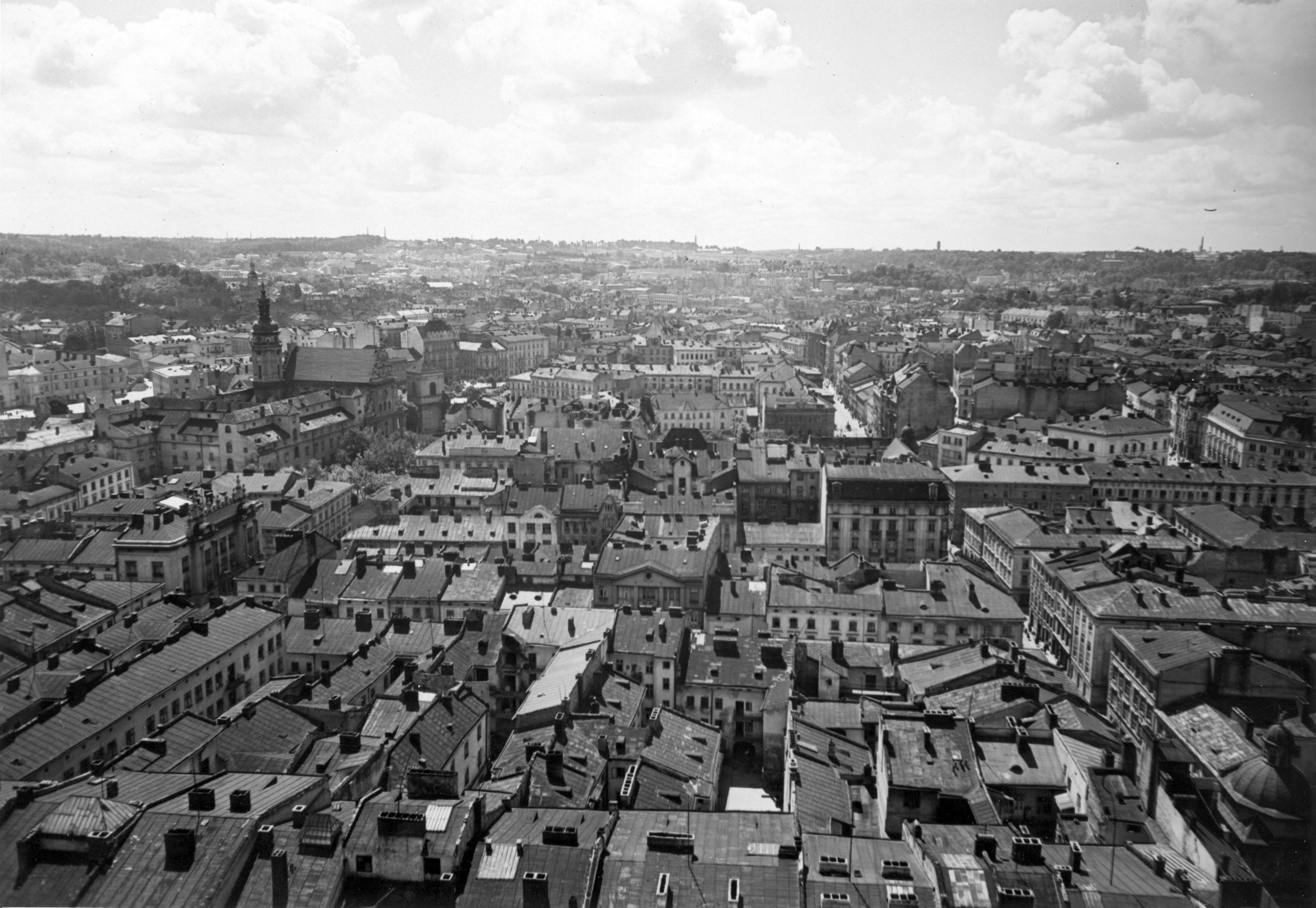
Aerial view of the city center during World War II

- 1939
  - 12 September: German forces attack the city. Battle of Lwów (1939) begins.
  - 18 September: Soviet forces join the German siege of the city.
  - 22 September: End of the Battle of Lwów. Soviet occupation begins.
  - September: Polish resistance movement established in the city.
  - The Soviets carried out deportations of captured Polish POWs to the USSR, mostly to Starobilsk.
  - October: Czerwony Sztandar Polish-language communist newspaper begins publication.
  - November: City annexed into Soviet Ukraine, and made capital of the newly formed Lviv Oblast.
- 1940
  - General Michał Karaszewicz-Tokarzewski, leader of the Polish resistance, arrested by the NKVD.
  - April–May: Many Polish defenders of the city murdered in the Katyn massacre by the Soviets.
  - 19–20 November: The Soviets sentenced 14 leaders of the local branch of the Union of Armed Struggle Polish resistance organization to death.
  - Union of Soviet Architects branch and Ukrainian State Institute of Urban Planning branch organized.
- 1941
  - 24 February: 13 leaders of the Union of Armed Struggle executed by the Soviets following their sentencing in November 1940.
  - 22–30 June: Battle of Lwów (1941).
  - 30 June: German occupation begins.
  - June–July: Lviv pogroms (1941).
  - July: Massacre of Lwów professors.
  - 26 July: Execution of pre-war Prime Minister of Poland Kazimierz Bartel by the Germans.
  - 1 August: City made capital of the newly formed District of Galicia within the General Government of occupied Poland.
  - 3 August: Stalag 328 prisoner-of-war camp established by the Germans.
  - September: Janowska concentration camp begins operating.
  - 8 November: Lwów Ghetto is established.
- 1942 - Local branch of the Żegota underground Polish resistance organization established to rescue Jews from the Holocaust.
- 1943
  - January: Stalag 328 POW camp relocated to Drohobycz.
  - November: Stalag 328 POW camp relocated from Drohobycz back to Lwów.
- 1944
  - 1 February: Stalag 328 POW camp converted into the Oflag 76 POW camp for officers.
  - 9 May: Oflag 76 POW camp dissolved.
  - 23–27 July: Polish Lwów Uprising against German occupation.
  - 27 July: German occupation ends; city re-occupied by the Soviet Union.
  - December: Expulsion of Poles from Lviv begins.
  - Central State Historical Archive of the Ukrainian SSR in Lviv established.
- 1945 - City annexed from Poland by the Soviet Union, and renamed to Lviv.

=== 1945–2000 ===
- 1945 – Lviv Bus Factory built.
- 1952
  - Lenin statue erected.
  - Hill of Glory monument and Bohdan Khmelnytsky Culture and Recreation Park built.
- 1957 - Ukrzakhidproektrestavratsia Institute established.
- 1958 - Polish People's Theatre established.
- 1963
  - Football Club Karpaty Lviv formed.
  - Ukraina Stadium opens.
- 1965 - Population: 496,000.
- 1966 - Pharmacy Museum opens.
- 1970
  - Ukraïnskyi visnyk magazine begins publication.
  - Population: 553,452.
- 1979 - Population: 665,065.
- 1985 - Population: 742,000.
- 1987
  - Lion Society formed.
  - Levshan-zillia magazine begins publication.
- 1989
  - Dead Rooster musical group formed.
  - Population: 786,903.
- 1990
  - Vyvykh festival festival begins.
  - Vasyl Shpitser becomes mayor.
  - Gazeta Lwowska Polish-language magazine begins publication.
  - Russian Cultural Centre opens.
  - Area of city: 90 square kilometers.
- 1991
  - City becomes part of independent Ukraine.
  - Chervona Ruta (festival) of music held.
  - Lviv Physics and Mathematics Lyceum founded.
- 1992
  - September: Chrysler Imperial rock opera performed.
  - Ekspres newspaper begins publication.
  - Austrian Library opens.
  - Radio Lwów begins broadcasting.
- 1993 - Znesinnia Regional Landscape Park established.
- 1994 - Vasyl Kuybida becomes mayor.
- 1996 - Lviv Suburban railway station built.
- 1998 - Old Town (Lviv) designated an UNESCO World Heritage Site.

== 21st century ==
- 2001 - Population: 725,202.
- 2002
  - 27 July: Air show disaster occurs near city.
  - Ukrainian Catholic University established.
- 2004 - Center for Urban History of East Central Europe founded.
- 2006 - Andriy Sadovyi becomes mayor.

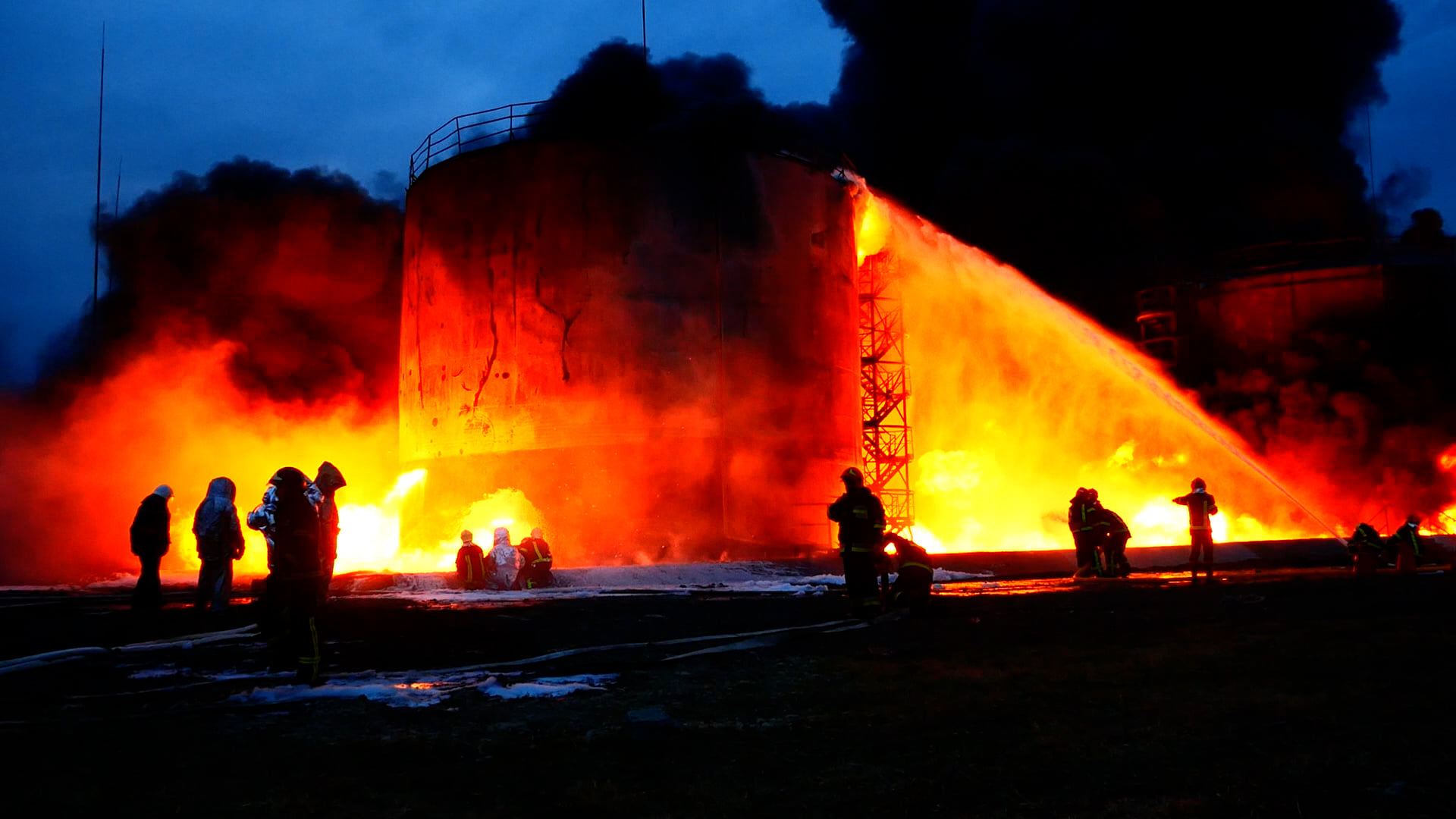
Fire at a fuel depot after Russian shelling in 2022

- 2008 - Etnovyr folklore festival and Wiz-Art film festival begin.
- 2009 - Pogoń Lwów football club re-established.
- 2011 - Arena Lviv opens.
- 2012 - June: Some UEFA Euro 2012 football games played in Lviv.
- 2014
  - January: 2014 Euromaidan regional state administration occupation.
  - February: 2014 Ukrainian revolution.
- 2018 - Population: 720,105 (estimate).
- 2022 - Russian missile attack on the city.

== See also ==
- History of Lviv
- Other names of Lviv (Lemberg, Lwów, etc.)
- List of mayors of Lviv

== Bibliography ==
Published in the 19th century

- Abraham Rees (1819), "Lemberg", The Cyclopaedia, London: Longman, Hurst, Rees, Orme & Brown, hdl:2027/mdp.39015068382327
- John Ramsay McCulloch (1851). "Lemberg". A Dictionary, Geographical, Statistical, and Historical. Longman, Brown, Green and Longmans.
- Charles Knight, ed. (1867). "Lemberg". Geography. Vol. 2. London. hdl:2027/nyp.33433000064802.
- David Kay (1880), "Principal Towns: Lemberg", Austria-Hungary, Foreign Countries and British Colonies, London: Sampson Low, Marston, Searle, & Rivington, hdl:2027/mdp.39015030647005
- George Henry Townsend (1877), "Lemberg", Manual of Dates (5th ed.), London: Frederick Warne & Co., hdl:2027/wu.89097349427
- George Ripley; Charles A. Dana, eds. (1879). "Lemberg". American Cyclopedia (2nd ed.). New York: D. Appleton and Company. hdl:2027/hvd.hn585q.
- "Lemberg" . Encyclopædia Britannica. Vol. 14 (9th ed.). 1882. p. 435.
- Norddeutscher Lloyd (1896), "Austria: Lemberg", Guide through Germany, Austria-Hungary, Italy, Switzerland, France, Belgium, Holland and England, Berlin: J. Reichmann & Cantor, OCLC 8395555

Published in the 20th century

- "Lemberg", Chambers's Encyclopaedia, London: W. & R. Chambers, 1901, hdl:2027/uc2.ark:/13960/t7zk5ms79
- "Lemberg". Handbook for Travellers in South Germany and Austria (15th ed.). London: J. Murray. 1903.
- A.S. Waldstein (1907), "Lemberg", Jewish Encyclopedia, vol. 7, New York, hdl:2027/osu.32435029752888
- "Lemberg" . Encyclopædia Britannica. Vol. 16 (11th ed.). 1910. pp. 409–410.
- S. Vailhe (1910). "Lemberg". Catholic Encyclopedia. New York.
- "Lemberg". Austria-Hungary (11th ed.). Leipzig: Karl Baedeker. 1911.
- Bohdan Janusz (1922). Przewodnik po Lwowie [Guide to Lwow] (in Polish). Lviv: Wszechświat.
- Rosa Bailly (1956), A City Fights for Freedom: The Rising of Lwów in 1918-1919, London: Publishing Committee Leopolis
- George G. Grabowicz (2000). "Mythologizing Lviv/Lwów: Echoes of Presence and Absence". Harvard Ukrainian Studies. 24: 313–342. JSTOR 41036821.
- Yaroslav Hrytsak (2000). "Lviv: A Multicultural History through the Centuries". Harvard Ukrainian Studies. 24: 47–73. JSTOR 41036810.
- Padraic Kenney (2000). "Lviv's Central European Renaissance, 1987–1990". Harvard Ukrainian Studies. 24: 303–312. JSTOR 41036820.
- Jacek Purchla (2000). "Patterns of Influence: Lviv and Vienna in the Mirror of Architecture". Harvard Ukrainian Studies. 24: 131–147. JSTOR 41036813.
- Bohdan Tscherkes; Nicholas Sawicki (2000). "Stalinist Visions for the Urban Transformation of Lviv, 1939–1955". Harvard Ukrainian Studies. 24: 205–222. JSTOR 41036816.

Published in 21st century

- Роман Лозинський (Roman Lozinski) (2005), Етнічний склад населення Львова (у контексті суспільного розвитку Галичини) [Ethnic composition of the city (in the context of social development Galicia)] (PDF) (in Ukrainian), Lviv: Ivan Franko National University of L'viv)
- Heidi Hein (2006). Christian Emden; et al. (eds.). Idea of Lviv as a Bulwark against the East. Peter Lang. p. 321. ISBN 978-3-03910-533-5.
- Markian Prokopovych (2009). Habsburg Lemberg: Architecture, Public Space, and Politics in the Galician Capital, 1772-1914. Purdue University Press. ISBN 978-1-55753-510-8.
- William Jay Risch (2011). Ukrainian West: Culture and the Fate of Empire in Soviet Lviv. Harvard University Press. ISBN 978-0-674-05001-3.
- Tarik Cyril Amar (2015). The Paradox of Ukrainian Lviv. A Borderland City between Nazis, Stalinists, and Nationalists. Cornell University. ISBN 978-0-8014-5391-5.
