= Stepan Andrusiv =

Ukrainian decorative and applied arts artist, teacher (born 1958)

- Степан Михайлович Андрусів
- Born: 4 January 1958 (age 68); Karaganda, Kazakhstan
- Education: Kosiv Vasyl Kasian Technical School of Folk Arts and Crafts, Lviv Institute of Applied and Decorative Arts
- Occupations: Decorative and applied arts artist, teacher

Stepan Andrusiv (Ukrainian: Степан Михайлович Андрусів; born 4 January 1958) is a Ukrainian decorative and applied arts artist, teacher. Member of the National Union of Artists of Ukraine (2004).

== Biography ==
Stepan Andrusiv was born on 4 January 1958, in Karaganda.

In 1979, he graduated from the Kosiv Vasyl Kasian Technical School of Folk Arts and Crafts, and in 1986, he graduated from the Lviv Institute of Applied and Decorative Arts (teachers Vasyl Gudak and Emmanuil Mysko). From then, he has been working at his alma mater (now the National Academy of Arts): in 2003–2009, he was the head of the Department of Art Ceramics, and from 2004, he has been a private associate professor there.

== Creativity ==
In 1987, he began exhibiting his works at national and international exhibitions. Solo exhibitions were held in Lviv (2018, 2025). He works in the fields of decorative ceramics, ceramics for architectural and landscape environments, and computer graphics. Some of his works are kept in the collections of the National Museum of Ukrainian Pottery in Opishnia, the National Folk Decorative Art Museum, and private collections in Ukraine, Germany, Poland, France, Belgium, Japan, and other countries.

Art historian Orest Holubets believes that Stepan Andrusiv's work is distinguished by its conciseness and skillful use of limited means of expression. This restraint allows the artist to strike an emotional chord and raise profound themes: sacred, mythological, and philosophical-existential. His works are profound and serious in both color and plastic expression. Andrusiv continues the pictorial tradition in contemporary Lviv ceramics, which includes such masters as Zenovii Flinta, Zynovii Bereza, Hryhorii Kichula, Vasyl Hudak, and Vasyl Bodnarchuk.

Among important works:

- Compositions — "Pisni ridnoho kraiu" (1986), "Rozmova" (2000), "Znaiomi ta neznayomi portrety" (2003);
- Decorative Plates — "Misto Leva" (1992), "Oblychchia vlady", "Karpaty. Rankova rosa" (both — 1999), "Neznayomets-1" (2000), "Nespodivana zustrich", "...tse Vona" (both — 2002);
- Garden and Park Sculpture — "Podorozh do Tukhli" (1999), "Proshtryknute nebo (Ti, shcho zavzhdy budut poruch)" (2000).

== Bibliography ==
- Andrusiv Stepan Mykhailovych / Z. A. Chehusova // Encyclopedia of Modern Ukraine [Online] / Eds. : I. М. Dziuba, A. I. Zhukovsky, M. H. Zhelezniak [et al.] ; National Academy of Sciences of Ukraine, Shevchenko Scientific Society. – Kyiv : The NASU institute of Encyclopedic Research, 2008.
- Чегусова З. Декоративне мистецтво України кінця ХХ століття. 200 імен: Альбом-каталог. — К., 2002.
