= Zheniv =

Rural locality in Lviv Oblast, Ukraine

Zheniv Женів
- Location in Lviv Oblast Zheniv (Ukraine)
- Coordinates: 49°50′39″N 24°30′11″E
- Country: Ukraine
- Oblast: Lviv Oblast
- Raion: Lviv Raion
- Hromada: Hlyniany urban hromada
- Time zone: UTC+2 (EET)
  - Summer (DST): UTC+3 (EEST)
- Postal code: 80720

Zheniv (Ukrainian: Женів) is a village in the Hlyniany urban hromada of the Lviv Raion of Lviv Oblast in Ukraine.

== History ==
The village was founded in 1569, as evidenced by a document granting King Sigismund II Augustus to Lviv Armenian Zacharii Stefanovych and his wife Katarzyna a mill and a pond in the wilderness of Zeniowo near Hlyniany.

In 1708, the village had its own parish within the Hlyniany district and a church dedicated to St. Demetrius.

On 19 July 2020, as a result of the administrative-territorial reform and liquidation of the Zolochiv Raion, the village became part of the Lviv Raion.

== Notable residents ==
- Zynovii Bereza (born 1933), Ukrainian ceramic artist
- Vasyl Kondratskyi (1864–1946), Ukrainian Greek Catholic priest

== Bibliography ==
- "Żeniów, wś, pow. przemyślański". Geographical Dictionary of the Kingdom of Poland (in Polish). 14. Warszawa: Kasa im. Józefa Mianowskiego. 1895. p. 775.
