= Mayor of Lviv =

The following is a list of mayors of the city of Lviv, Ukraine. It includes positions equivalent to mayor, such as chairperson of the city council executive committee.

== Mayors ==
=== Beginnings of local self-government ===
Soon after Lviv's foundation in the mid-13th century, the city became the capital of Galicia-Volhynia. After the granting of Magdeburg rights in the late 13th century, the position of mayor, then known as wójt (Ukrainian: війт) was introduced. The first known person on this position was Berthold Stecher, an ethnic German who served as the head of Lviv's local government around 1300.

=== Prominent mayors (burmistrz) during the Polish rule ===
- Johann Schwarz (1372-1378) - first burgomaster of Lviv, who likely constructed the city's first town hall
- Peter Stecher (1407)
- Paweł Kampian (1584)
- Stanisław Dybowicki (1594, 1601)
- Stanisław Scholz (1598)
- Georg Boim (between 1610 and 1614)
- Bartołomiej Uberowicz (1619)
- Marcin Kampian (1623)
- Erasmus Sixt (1627)
- Jan Alnpeck (1630)
- Józef Bartłomiej Zimorowic (1648, 1664-1672)
- Marcin Groswaier (1641, 1643, 1645, 1650)
- Dominik Wilczek (1686, 1688, 1692, 1694, 1701, 1704)
- Vasyl Illiashevych (1763, 1765, 1766, 1769)
- Józef Jaśkiewicz (1786)
- Jakub Bernatowicz (1786)

=== Habsburg monarchy - Austrian Partition ===
==== Burgomasters ====
- Marcin Mercenier
- Franciszek Longchamps de Bérier
- Franz Anton Lorenz (1787-1816) - organized a "Festival of Peace" in 1814, dedicated to the defeat of Napoleon Bonaparte
- Jan Hoffman (1817–1825)
- Johann Homme (1825–1841) - during his tenure in 1826 the tower of the old town hall collapsed, killing several people; the new town hall was erected on the site in 1827-1835
- Emil Gerard Festenburg (1842–1848)
- Michał Gnoiński 1848
- Karol Höpflingen-Bergendorf (1848–1858)
- Franciszek Kröbl (1859–1869)
- Julian Szemelowski (1869–1871)

==== Presidents of Lviv ====
According to a new city statute adopted in 1870, the position of burgomaster was replaced with the post of president, the holder of which was elected by members of the city council

- Florian Ziemiałkowski (1871–1873) - first head of Lviv to bear the title of president; later became a minister of Galician affairs in the Austrian government
- Aleksander Jasiński (1873–1880)
- Michał Gnoiński (1880–1883)
- Wacław Dąbrowski (1883–1887)
- Edmund Mochnacki (1887–1896) - in 1894 electric tram was launched in Lviv
- Godzimir Małachowski (1896–1905)
- Michał Michalski (1905–1907)
- Stanisław Ciuchciński (1907–1911)
- Józef Neumann (1911–1914)
- Tadeusz Rutowski (1914–1915, 1918) - taken hostage by Russian forces during their retreat from the city in 1915

=== Second Polish Republic ===
==== Presidents ====
- Władysław Stesłowicz (1919)
- Józef Neumann (1919–1927)
- Jan Strzelecki (1927–1928)
- Otto Nadolski
- Jan Brzozowski-Haluch (1930–1931)
- Wacław Drojanowski (1931–1936)
- Stanisław Ostrowski (1936–1939)

==== Vice Presidents ====
- Wawrzyniec Kubala (1931–1935)
- Zdzisław Stroński (1932-)
- Roman Dunin
- Wiktor Chajes
- Franciszek Irzyk
- Jan Weryński
- Michał Kolbuszowski

=== World War II ===
Soviet occupation

- Fyodor Jeremenko (1939–1941)

German occupation

- Yurii Polianskyi (1941)
- Hans von Kujath (1941–1942)
- Egon Höller (1942–1944)

=== Ukrainian SSR ===
==== Heads of Lviv City Executive Committee ====
After Lviv was incorporated into the USSR, the position of the president of Lviv, elected by the City Council, was abolished. The city was ruled by the chairman of the Presidium of the Lviv City Council (Голови міськвиконкому).

- Pavel Boyko (1944–1945)
- Petro Taran (1945–1948)
- Vasyl Nikolaenko (1948–1951)
- Kostiatyn Boyko (1951–1956)
- Petro Ovsianko (1956–1958)
- Spyrydon Bondarchuk (1958–1959)
- Vasyl Nikolaenko (1959–1961)
- Roman Zaverbnyi (1961–1963)
- Apołłon Jagodzinski (1963–1971) - longest-serving head of Lviv in Soviet times; initiated the creation of Karpaty football club
- Roman Musiyevskyi (1971–1975)
- Viacheslav Sekretariuk (1975–1980)
- Volodymyr Pekhota (1980–1988)
- Bohdan Kotyk (1988–1990) - a former member of the Communist Party, he initiated the removal of Vladimir Lenin monument in front of the Lviv Opera; under his tenure the blue-and-yellow flag was hoisted over the city hall

=== Ukraine ===
After the establishment of independent Ukraine, until 1998 the modified system of the Soviet Union was preserved (chairman of the presidium of the City Council, combined with the function of the chairman of the council). Since 1998, the mayor of Lviv, elected in direct democratic elections, is also the chairman of the executive committee of the City Council (the so-called miskvykonkom) and the chairman of the Lviv City Council.

- Vasyl Shpitser (1990–1994) - head of the executive committee

==== Mayors of Lviv ====
- Vasyl Kuybida (1994–2002) - elected mayor of Lviv in the city's first direct mayoral elections; later served as a People's Deputy of Ukraine and Minister of Construction and Regional Development
- Liubomyr Buniak (2002-2005)
- Zinoviy Siryk (2005-2006)
- Andriy Sadovyi (2006-present)

== See also ==
- Timeline of Lviv
