= Ihor Bereza =

Ukrainian ceramic artist (born 1959)

- Ігор Зиновійович Береза
- Born: 4 August 1959 (age 67); Lviv
- Education: Lviv Ivan Trush School of Decorative and Applied Arts, Lviv Institute of Applied and Decorative Arts
- Occupation: Ceramic artist

Ihor Bereza (Ukrainian: Ігор Зиновійович Береза; born 4 August 1959) is a Ukrainian ceramic artist. Member of the National Union of Artists of Ukraine (1992), International Academy of Ceramics (2019). Son of Zenovii Bereza.

== Biography ==
Ihor Bereza was born on 4 August 1959, in Lviv.

He studied at the Lviv Children Art School. In 1978, he graduated from the Lviv Ivan Trush School of Decorative and Applied Arts, and in 1983, from the Lviv Institute of Applied and Decorative Arts (specialty teachers Dmytro Krvavych, Vitold Manastyrskyi, PVasyl Hudak). He worked at the Lviv Experimental Ceramic and Sculptural Factory.

== Creativity ==
In 1983, he began his exhibition activity at the city and international levels (Germany, Canada, Poland, USA). He has participated in numerous symposia (Ukraine, Poland, Lithuania, Belarus).

I. Bereza's works feature highly conditional figurative and abstract plasticity, incorporating symbols and techniques based on national imagery, which are combined with artistic forms from world art. In his easel and exhibition pieces, the primary focus is on form-image tasks. Individual works are preserved in the collections of "Del Bello Gallery" (Toronto), the Borys Voznytsky Lviv National Art Gallery, the National Museum-Preserve of Ukrainian Pottery (Opishnia, Poltava Oblast), the Museum of Ceramics (Bolesławiec, Poland), the National Museum (Wrocław, Poland), and the State Museum of Decorative and Applied Arts (Kyiv).

Among important works:

- Compositions: "Tin" (1986), "Krymski skeli", "Prysyutnist" (both 1988), "Sny" (1990), "Chorna postat", "Bila postat" (both 1996), "Nich" (1997), "Voiny" (1998), "Zakhysnyk-voin" (1999), "Try plasty" (2000), "Personazhi" (2001);
- Decorative plate: "Nich" (1991);
- Decorative sculpture: "Chornohora" (1994);
- Decorative relief: "Simia" (1995);
- Ceramic sculpture: "Mezha" (1995).

== Awards ==
- 2nd prize at the 7th and 8th International Exhibitions of Small Forms Art (1993, Toronto);
- Grand Prix of the III National Exhibition-Competition of Artistic Ceramics "KeramPIK in Opishnia!" (2023, Opishnia, Poltava Oblast);
- Silver award of the II Vasyl Krychevskyi International Biennial of Artistic Ceramics (2023).

== Bibliography ==
- Bereza Ihor Zynoviiovych / Z. A. Chehusova // Encyclopedia of Modern Ukraine [Online] / Eds. : I. М. Dziuba, A. I. Zhukovsky, M. H. Zhelezniak [et al.] ; National Academy of Sciences of Ukraine, Shevchenko Scientific Society. – Kyiv : The NASU institute of Encyclopedic Research, 2003.
- Чегусова З. Декоративне мистецтво України кінця ХХ століття. 200 імен: Альбом-каталог. — К., 2002.
- Мистецтво України ХХ століття: Каталог. — К., 1998.
