= Pidhaichyky, Lviv Raion =

Rural locality in Lviv Oblast, Ukraine

Coordinates: 49.7525°N 24.4872°E

Pidhaichyky Підгайчики
- Village Council Center
- Location within Lviv Oblast
- Country: Ukraine
- Oblast: Lviv Oblast
- District: Lviv Raion
- Hromada: Hlyniany urban hromada
- Founded: 1396

Government
  - Head of village council: Yaremchuk Maria

Population (2001)
  - Total: 600
- Time zone: UTC+02:00 (EET)
  - Summer (DST): UTC+03:00 (EEST)
- Postal code: 80726
- Area codes: +380 3265
- Website: pidhaichyky.org.ua

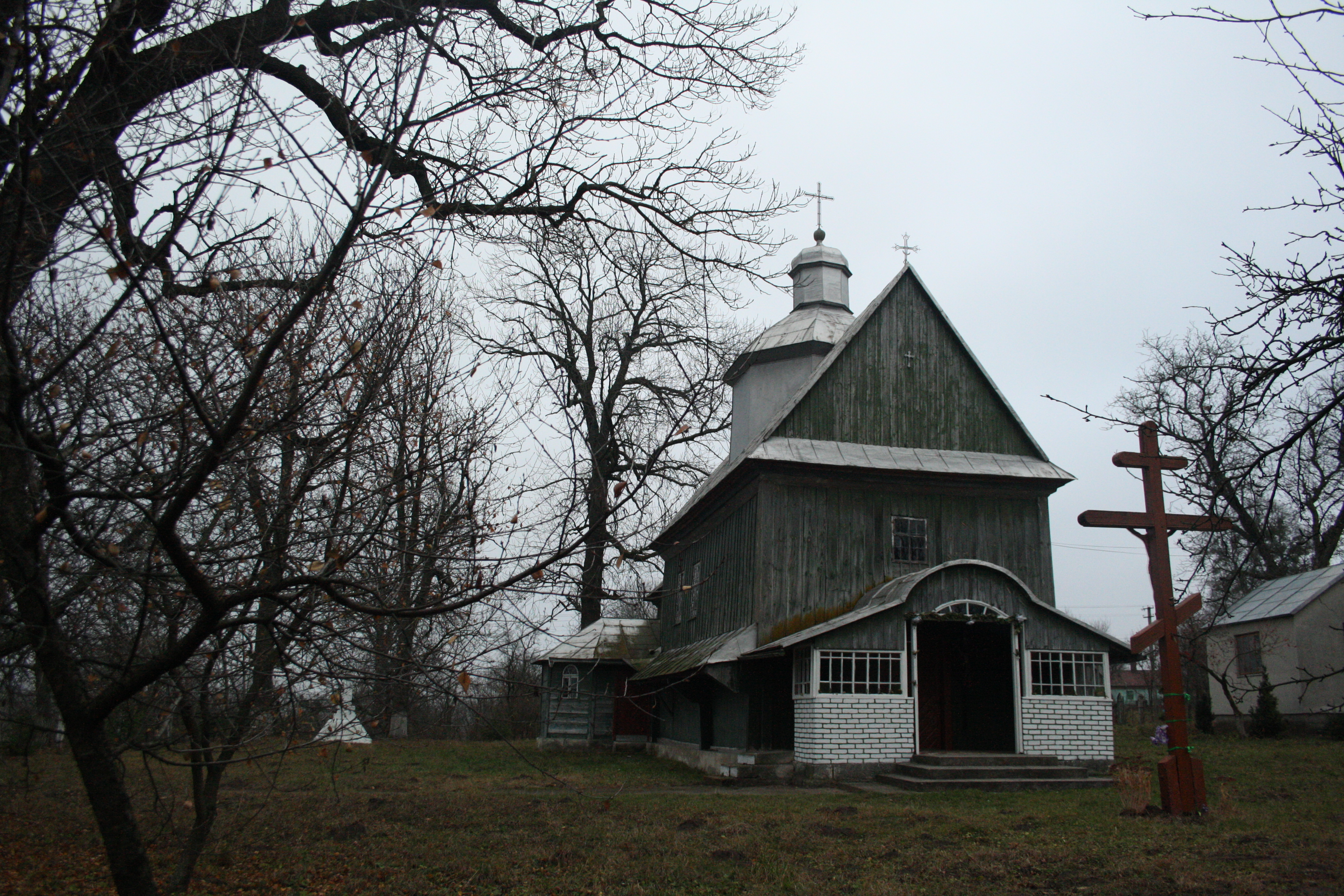
Pidhaichyky church

Pidhaichyky is a village in Lviv Raion, Lviv Oblast of Ukraine. Until 18 July 2020, it belonged to Zolochiv Raion. As a result of the administrative reform of Ukraine, which reduced the number of raions of Lviv Oblast to seven, Pidhaichyky was moved to a newly established Lviv Raion.

Pidhaychyky is located on the road Lviv - Ternopil, 37 km west of Zolochiv. There is secondary school in the village. Pidhaichyky was first mentioned in written sources in 1397.

The village council area includes:

- Kosychi (Kasychi, Alfredivka) - in 1900 - 339 persons; in 1943 - 456 persons.
- Pogoriltsy - in 1900 - 768 persons; in 1943 - 727 persons.
- Turkotyn - in 1900 - 513 persons; in 1943 - 522 persons.
