= Boim Chapel =

Chapel in Lviv, Ukraine

Coordinates: 49°50′26″N 24°1′52″E

- Каплиця Боїмів, Kaplica Boimów
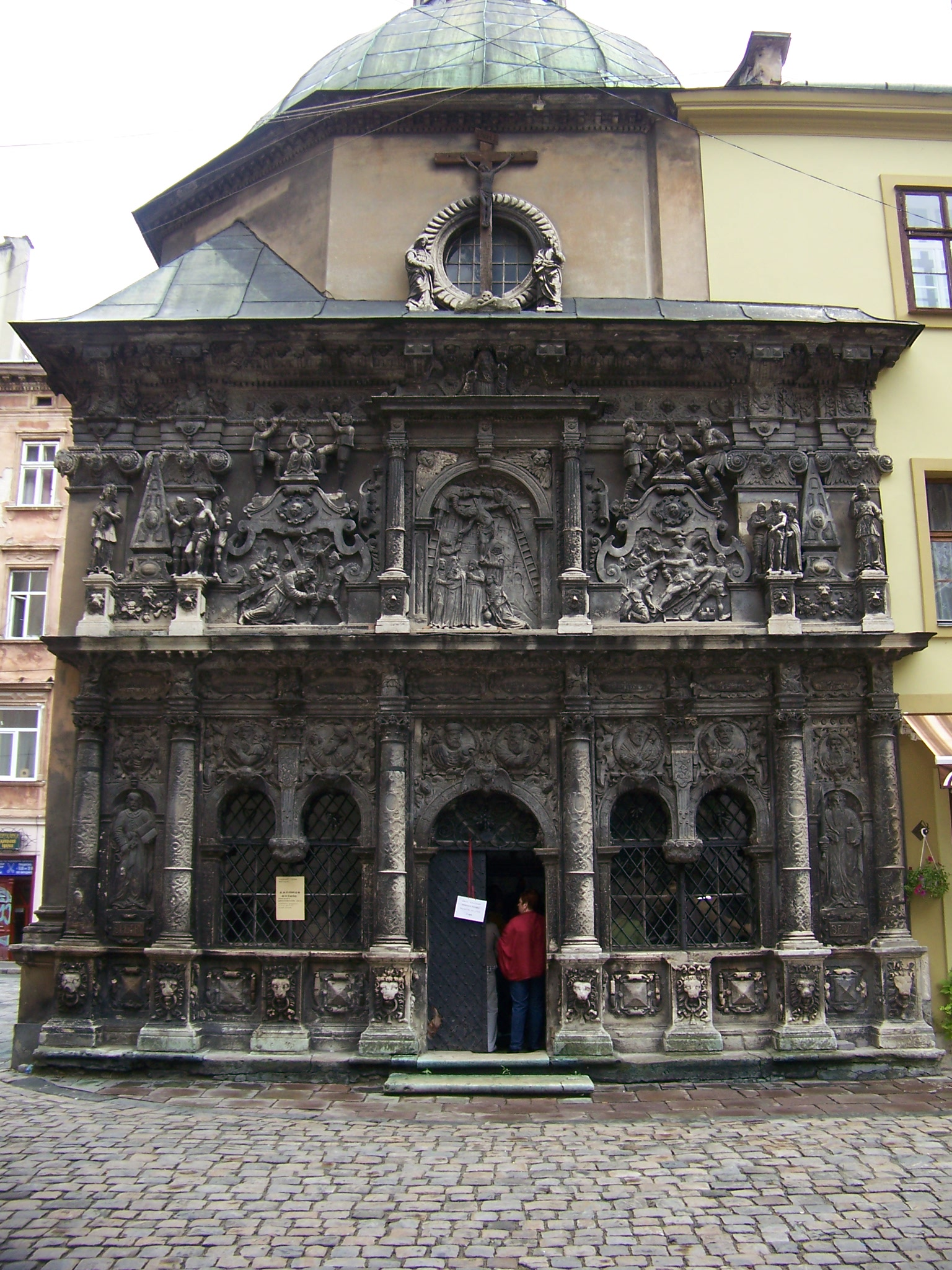
- View from the northeast at the chapel

Religion
- Affiliation: Roman Catholic
- Patron: St. Stanislaus and Adalbert of Prague
- Year consecrated: 1615

Location
- Location: Lviv, Ukraine
- Interactive map of Boim Chapel

Architecture
- Architect: Andrzej Bemer
- Type: Renaissance architecture
- Funded by: Georgy Boim
- Groundbreaking: 1609
- Completed: 1615

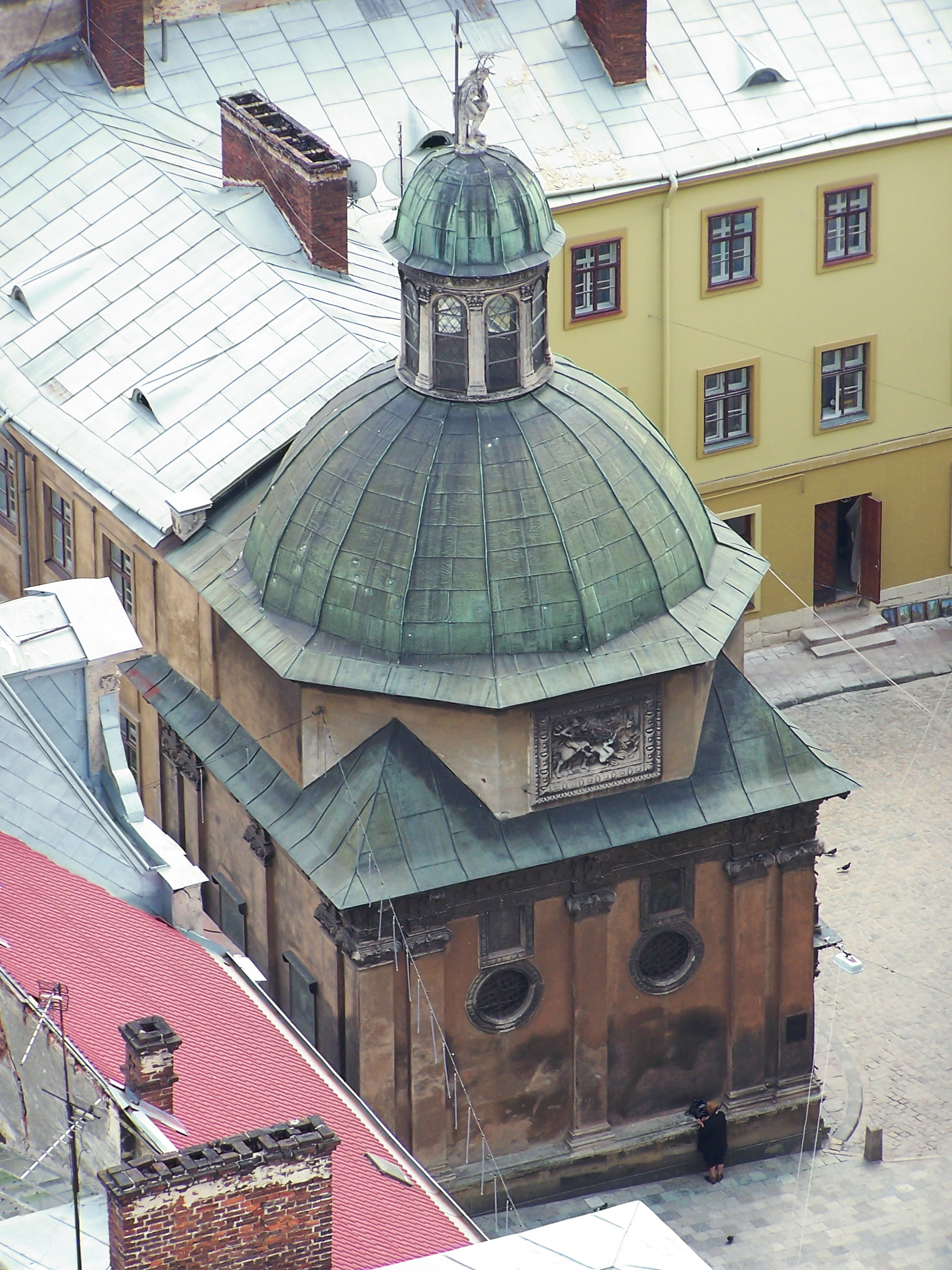
Boim Chapel. General view of the northern facade. View from the town hall.

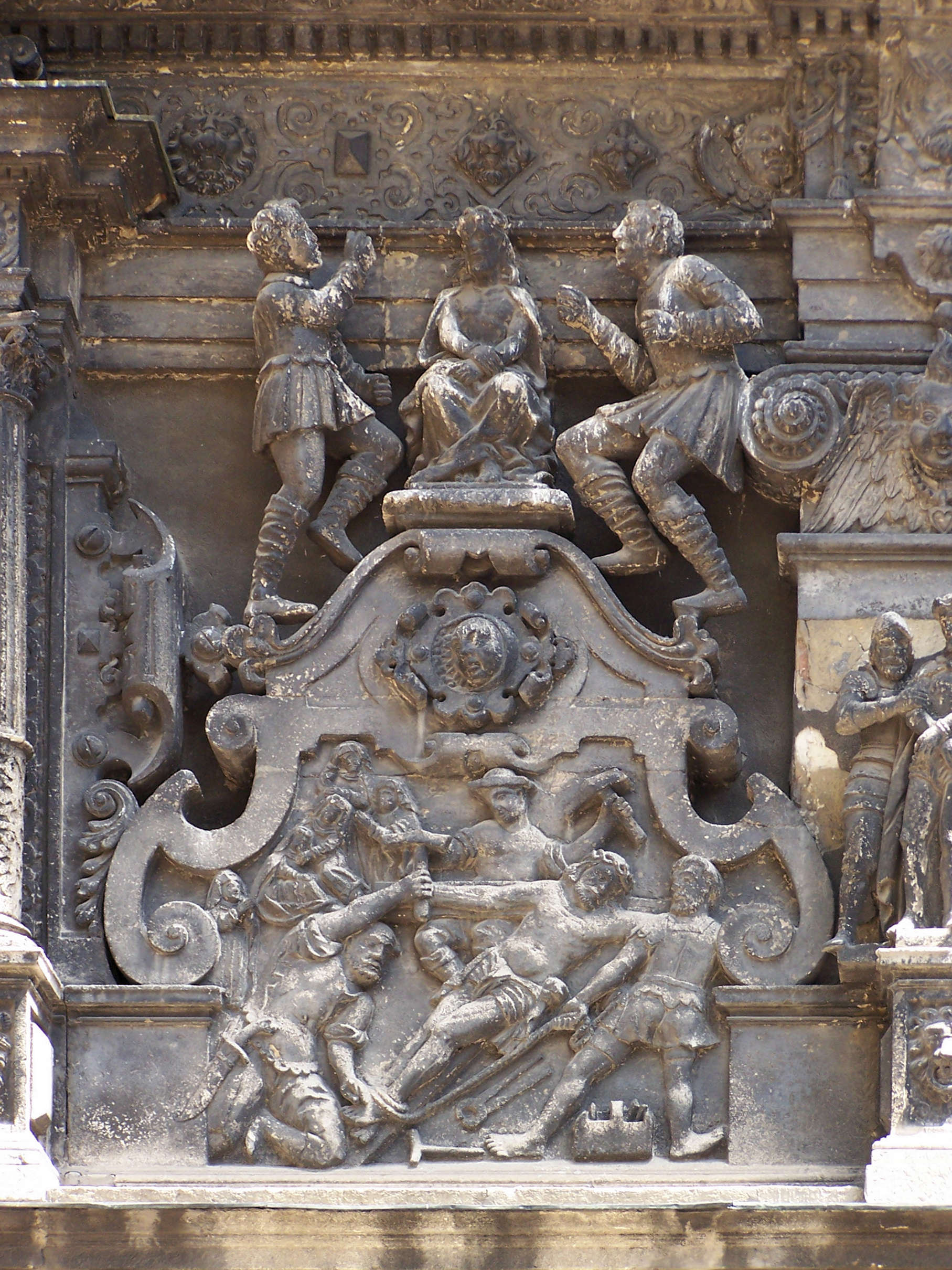
Boim Chapel. Detail of the facade. The composition "Descent from the Cross"

The Boim Chapel (Ukrainian: Каплиця Боїмів; Polish: Kaplica Boimów) is a monument of religious architecture in Cathedral Square, Lviv, Ukraine. It was constructed from 1609 to 1615 and is part of Lviv's Old Town, a UNESCO World Heritage Site.

== History ==
The chapel was built for the Boim family on the territory of a contemporary urban cemetery near the Latin Cathedral. The Boims came to Lviv (Polish: Lwów, then in the Kingdom of Poland) from the Kingdom of Hungary. Their national origin is unclear. They were affluent patricians of Catholic background and became polonized.

George (Jerzy) Boim (Hungarian: György Boym) is credited with the foundation of the chapel. The building was finished by his son, Paweł Boim. 14 members of the Boim family are buried there.

The chapel was designed by Andrzej Bemer. He followed a simplified diagram of the architecture of the Sigismund's Chapel at the Wawel Cathedral in Kraków with Italians' elements.

In the second half of the 18th century, the chapel was replaced by the Lviv cemetery as a burial place for the Boim family.

== Architectural features ==
The chapel combines a variety of stylistic trends. The ornamental decorations are of Dutch provenance. The narrative reliefs bear some degree of resemblance to those found in central and southern Poland, but are presumably based on German or Dutch graphic models. The appearance of the facade and the altar recalls the iconostasis form. The sculptor Jan Scholtz, who was likely responsible for the second stage of the work, originated from Königsberg.

The quality of the design and the lack of moderation persists in Kraków active works of Italian masters, but acting example of bourgeois art. The chapel was built on a square plan and is covered by a paneled dome based on an octagonal tambour. On the chapel lantern rises on eight fluted pilasters with Corinthian capitals, covered again with a small dome, having a statue of Christ on top.

== External appearance ==
The walls of the chapel are focused according to the sides of the world. Entablature creates the external appearance of the walls, which revolves around them, breaking down in accordance with their relief.

The southern side is closed with a residential house, which is attached to the chapel. It was built in the 19th century.

The eastern wall is divided by five pilasters and decorated with two mural portraits of Georgy Boim and his wife, Jadwiga. The portraits were created in 1617, by Jan Gianni.

The northern wall is also divided by pilasters. Two fresco images are located there: the Virgin and Jesus Christ. A bas-relief of Saint George (the name saint of Georgy Boim) fighting the dragon is situated on the wall of the octagonal tambour.

=== Western wall ===
The façade’s decorations are attributed to Andrzej Bemer. The western wall is considered to be the most important. It includes a great amount of decorative elements. The whole facade is covered densely with figures and ornamental sculptures, made of sandstone. The facade is divided with cartouche frieze and cornice on two parts. The upper part is decorated with two corinthian columns. The lower part is decorated with six corinthian columns. It also includes the statues of the Apostles Peter and Paul, which are located in the niches on both sides, with the prophets’ circular medallions over the door, windows and niches. Though this facade demonstrates the impression of exaggeration and manners.

In the second tier of the cartouche above sculpture’s images of the prophets are located the quotes from the Bible in Latin (on the facade from left to right):

- «Morte turpissima condemnemus / eum sapi I» ("Condemn him to death shameful" (Bk. Wisdom 2.20) – above St. Peter;
- «Foderunt manus meos et pedes meos / DA Psal. XXI » ("They pierced my hands and my feet" (Psalm. 22 (21). 17);
- «Corpus meum dedi percucientibus et genas vellentibus / Esai. L »(« I gave my back to those who hits, and my cheeks to those who pinches" (Isaiah 50.6);
- «Mittamus lignum in panem eius. Et eradamus eum de terra viventium / Ier: XI » ("Cut down the tree with its fruit, and cut off it from the land of living " (Jeremiah 11.19));
- «Et post hebdomadas LXII occidetur Christus / DAN. IX » ("And after 62 weeks Messiah shall be cut off "(Daniel 9.26);
- «Et appenderunt mercedem meam XXX argenteos / Zach XI» ("So they weighed my wages – thirty pieces of silver" (Zechariah 11.12) – the entrance;
- In Virga percutien [t] maxillam ivdicis / Mich. V. ("Rod upon the judge’s cheek" (Micah 4.14)) – the entrance;
- «Et dicent non est Rex Noster / Ose X» ("And they say, We have no king" (Hosea 10.3) – above St. Paul.

The third tier has many relief images. It contains compositions, dedicated to the Passion of Christ: "Castigate", "Carrying the Christ," "Crucifixion", "Withdrawal of Christ." Due to the expressiveness these compositions and the interior’s composition are called "Bible of the poor". As it does not need to know the letters, to understand the essence.

== Chapel interior ==
The interior of the chapel includes four stone figures of prophets, located in the altar, which resembles some images on frieze. The whole plastic decoration is made of stucco. A special attention is paid to pendentives and the dome. On the pendentives, which have the rich framing of the telescopes from both sides. This framing consists of a flat – convex brass motifs and medallions with heads of angels, the same type as on the frieze external. On the pendentives there are angels, which hold cartouches with images of divinities, coats of arms and house marks.

Beneath them there are figurines of patrons, both founders: St. Stanislaus and Adalbert of Prague. The majority of sculptures of the chapel’s interior are made by Hans Ficher. The dome is divided into 36 rectangular panels, recessed in three rows. They fill the figures of Christ, the apostles, prophets, angels with instruments of the Passion Pańzkiej and saints. At the top of the dome there is the octagonal lantern light. This arrangement gives the impression of a much bigger height chapel than it actually is.

Three round windows provide chapel’s interior lighting. Two of them are situated at the top of the northern wall and another — under the dome of the octagonal lantern light on the western facade. Additional lighting is provided by four lower tier of the lower windows of the main facade.

Interior of the Boim Chapel

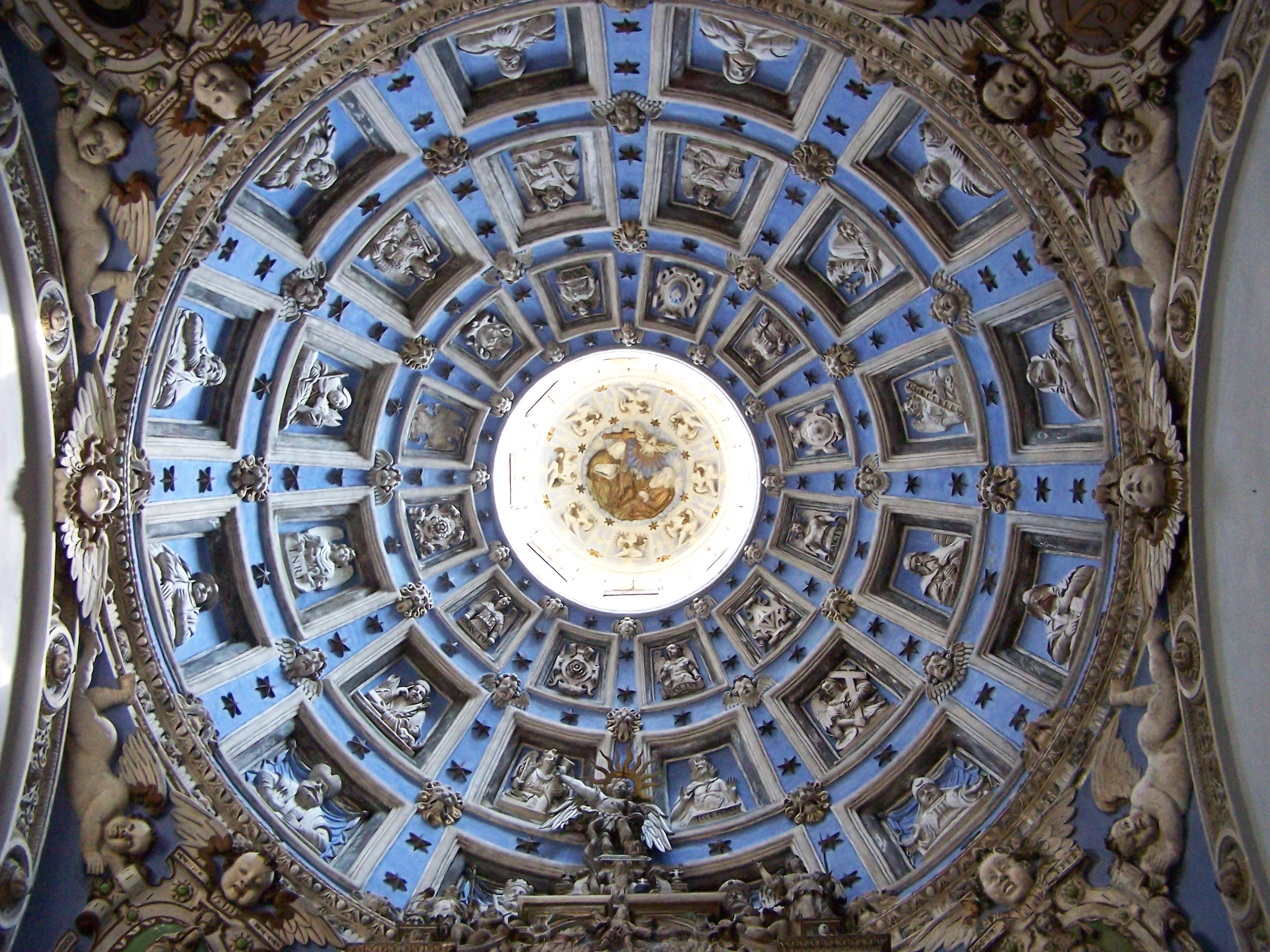
Inside the dome of the chapel Boim bowl with three rows of caissons

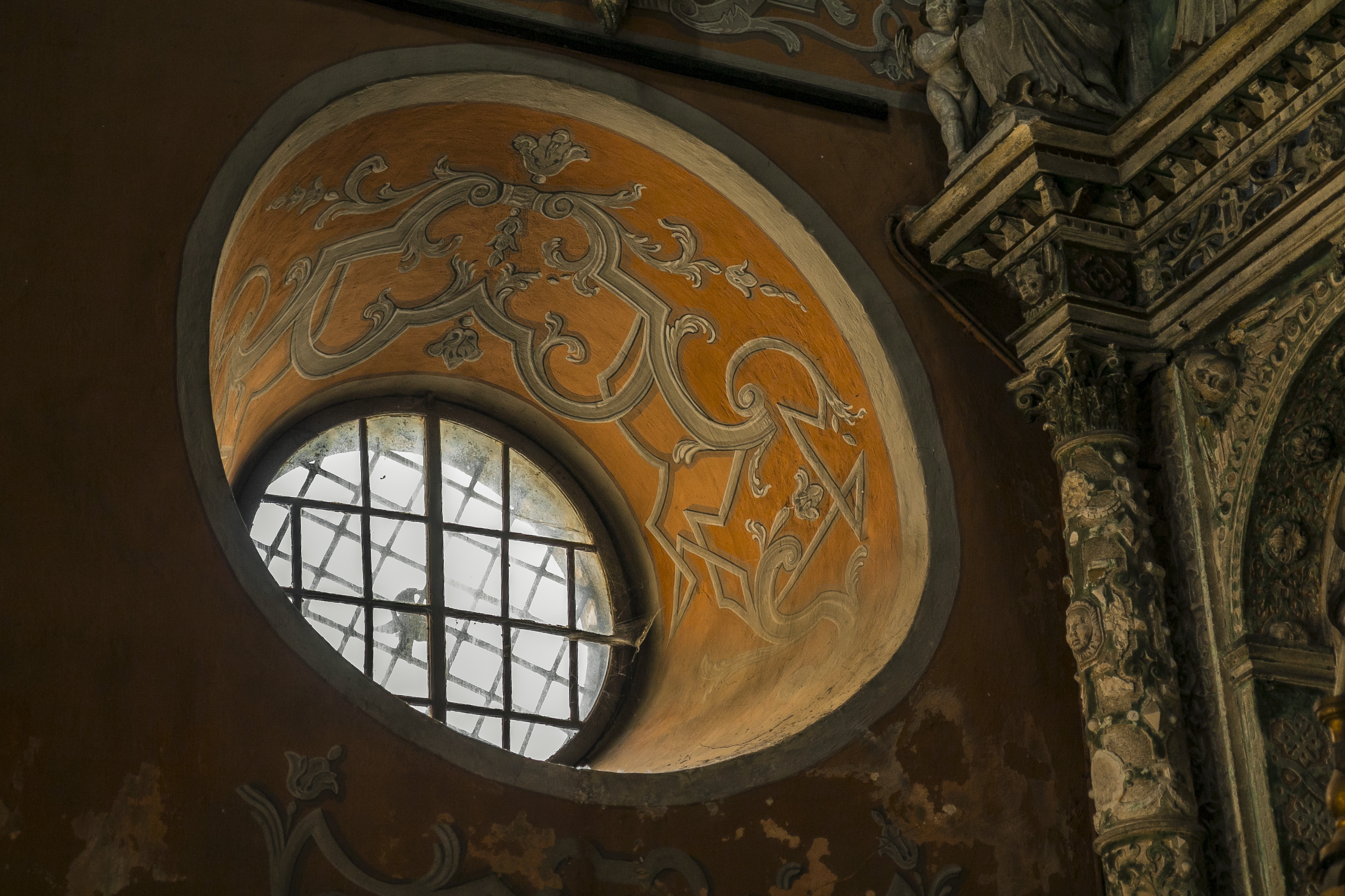
Round windows

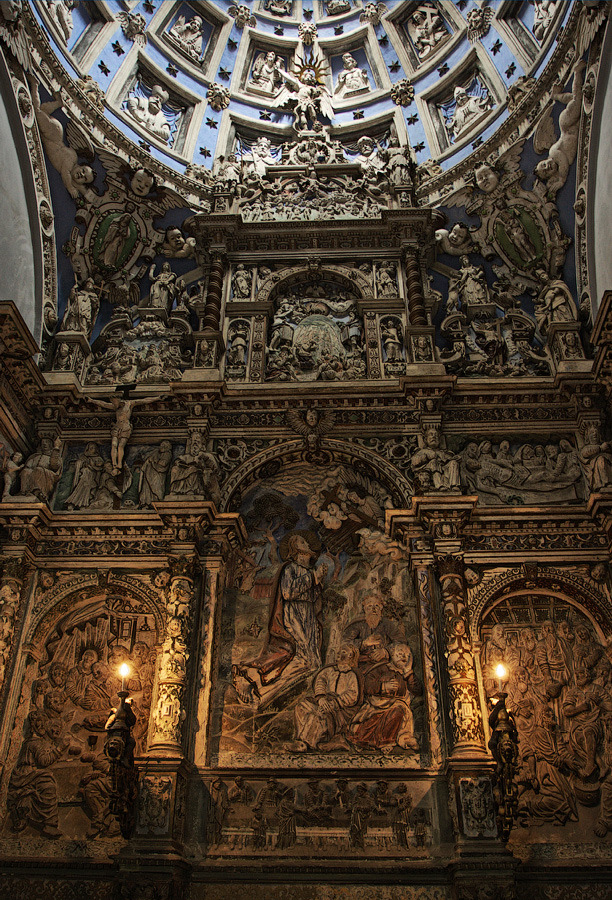
Part of the altar
