= Paweł Kampian =

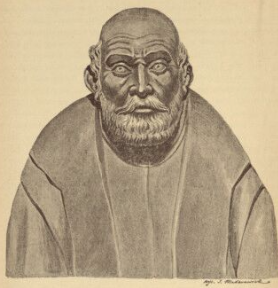
- Born: c. 1527
- Died: 21 November 1600; Lviv, Polish–Lithuanian Commonwealth
- Education: Kraków Academy; University of Bologna
- Occupations: Physician, merchant, financier
- Spouse: Anna Grynwald
- Children: Marcin Kampian
- Relatives: Wojciech Nowopolczyk (brother)

Paweł Kampian (also Paweł Novicampianus, Novicampius, Novus Campianus; c. 1527 – 21 November 1600) was a Polish physician, merchant and financier who served as a city councillor and mayor of Lviv. He was one of the wealthiest members of the Lviv patriciate in the second half of the 16th century and the progenitor of the Lviv Kampian family. He founded the Kampian Chapel at the Latin Cathedral in Lviv.

== Life ==
=== Origins and education ===
Kampian was born around 1527. He probably came from Koniecpol, formerly known as Nowopole, from which he derived the Latinised surname Novicampianus (Polish: Nowopolczyk) that he used and which was later shortened to Kampian. His original surname is said to have been Wosczyna or Woszczynka. He was most likely a runaway serf from the estates of the Koniecpolski family.

His brother was Wojciech Nowopolczyk (c. 1504–1559), a theologian, professor and rector of the Kraków Academy, and tutor to John Sigismund Zápolya.

In 1544, Kampian began his studies at the Kraków Academy. He studied philosophy and medicine and later obtained a doctorate in medicine from the University of Bologna.

=== Career in Lviv ===
Around 1560, Kampian settled in Lviv. In the same year he acquired municipal citizenship and became the city's physician. Through his marriage to Anna Grynwald, he entered the ranks of the Lviv patriciate. In 1584, he became a member of the city council. He later served as mayor of Lviv.

In addition to practising medicine, Kampian was extensively involved in business. He engaged in trade, real-estate transactions and moneylending. He amassed a considerable fortune and became one of the wealthiest inhabitants of Lviv. He also extended credit to the city itself, which secured its debts to him against municipal revenues and property. Kampian owned property in Lviv as well as estates in the surrounding area. His financial activities resulted in numerous disputes and lawsuits. One particularly protracted conflict involved the Lviv pharmacist Paweł Abrahamowicz.

Towards the end of his life, Kampian began the foundation of a family funerary chapel at the Latin Cathedral in Lviv. The resulting Renaissance Kampian Chapel was later completed and decorated by his son, Marcin Kampian. In his will, Kampian also allocated funds for the establishment of a charitable credit institution of the mons pietatis type at the cathedral, intended to provide loans against pledged property. He designated his chapel as the place where money and pledges belonging to the institution were to be kept. The foundation did not become fully operational until after his death.

His son Marcin Kampian (c. 1574–1629) was a physician, city councillor and mayor of Lviv. He inherited his father's fortune and became one of the most influential figures in the city during the first half of the 17th century. Paweł Kampian also had a daughter, Zuzanna, who married Marek Szarfenberg-Ostrogórski.

Kampian died on 21 November 1600. He was buried in the chapel he had founded at the Latin Cathedral in Lviv.

== Bibliography ==
- Kowalska, Halina (1964–1965). "Kampian (Novicampianus, Novicampius, Novus Campianus) Paweł (ok. 1527–1600)". Polski Słownik Biograficzny (in Polish). Vol. XI. Wrocław–Warszawa–Kraków. pp. 594–595.
- Łoziński, Władysław (1890). Patrycyat i mieszczaństwo lwowskie w XVI i XVII wieku (in Polish). Lwów.
