= Józef Bartłomiej Zimorowic =

Polish poet and historian

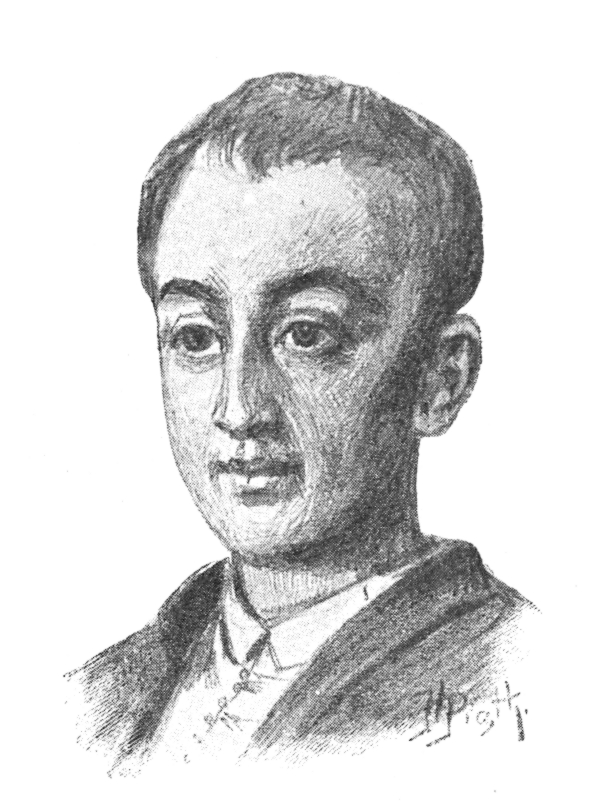

Józef Bartłomiej Zimorowic (August 20, 1597 – October 14, 1677) was a Polish poet and historian of the Baroque era, most famous for his pastoral poems Sielanki nowe ruskie (New Ruthenian Pastorals), first published in Kraków in 1663. He was born into a Lwów Armenian family, his father was of a stonemason, Stanisŀaw Ozimek, and educated at the cathedral school in the city. He began to work for the city chancellery and in 1624 changed his surname to Zimorowic in order to advance his career by distancing himself from his artisanal background. He married Katarzyna Duchnicówna, the daughter of a rich goldsmith (she died in 1653). In 1640, he took over the running of the city chancellery, became a councillor and was several times mayor of Lwów, which allowed him to take part in the election of King Jan Kazimierz in 1648.

Zimorowic was interested in the history of Lwów and studied the city chronicles. In 1671 he published Viri illustres civitatis Leopoliensis (Famous Men of the City of Lwów), a collection of biographies of notable local figures. Another work, Leopolis triplex, tracing the history of Lwów until 1633, remained in manuscript until the late 19th century.

When Zimorowic's most important collection of poems Sielanki nowe ruskie first appeared in 1663 the name on the title page was not Zimorowic's own but that of his younger brother Szymon, who had died in 1629. The reason for this misattribution is still a mystery (their true authorship was only discovered by August Bielowski in 1839). Szymon had written some pastoral poems of his own, published in 1654 under the title Roksolanki to jest ruskie panny (Roxolani, or Ruthenian Ladies). Some of the poems in Józef Bartłomiej's collection had been written as early as the 1620s and contain many references to the author's family and friends as well as political events of the time. It is possible that Zimorowic published them as a tribute to his wife on the tenth anniversary of her death. Zimorowic acknowledges the most important earlier Polish pastoral poet Szymon Szymonowic, whose Sielanki appeared in 1614, as his master, but his own poems are notable for their local, "Ruthenian" (i.e. Ukrainian) colour and are clearly set in the landscape around Lwów.

== Works ==
- Żywot Kozaków Lisowskich (1620)
- Testament luterski żartownie napisany (1623)
- Pamiątka wojny tureckiej (1623)
- Ecce deus, ecce homo (1633)
- Advocatus mundi (1640)
- Jesus, Maria, Joseph (1640)
- Hymny na uroczyste święta Bogarodzice Maryi (1640)
- Sielanki nowe ruskie (1663)
- Viri illustres civitatis Leopoliensis (1671)
- Domus virtutis et honoris (in Thaumaturgus Russiae, 1673) - full text
- Leopolis triplex (posthumously published late 19th century)

== See also ==
- List of mayors of Lviv

== Sources ==
Bibliography

- J.B. Zimorowic Sielanki nowe ruskie ed. Ludwika Szczerbicka-Ślęk (Biblioteka Narodowa, 1999)
