= Zynovii Bereza =

Ukrainian ceramic artist (born 1933)

- Зиновій Іванович Береза
- Born: 29 July 1933 (age 93); Zheniv, now Lviv Oblast, Ukraine
- Education: Lviv Ivan Trush School of Applied Arts, Lviv Institute of Applied and Decorative Arts
- Occupation: Ceramic artist

Zynovii Bereza (Ukrainian: Зиновій Іванович Береза; born 29 July 1933) is a Ukrainian ceramic artist. Member of the Union of Artists of Ukraine from 1971, member of the Lviv Regional Organization of the Ukrainian Society of the Deaf. Father of ceramic artist Ihor Bereza.

== Biography ==
Born on 29 July 1933 in the village of Zheniv (now Zolochiv Raion, Lviv Oblast, Ukraine). Lost his hearing in childhood. After the German-Soviet War, he studied at a special boarding school, graduated from the Lviv Art School in 1952, and in 1957, he graduated from the Department of Artistic Ceramics at the Lviv Ivan Trush School of Applied Arts. In 1965, he graduated from the Lviv Institute of Applied and Decorative Arts (teachers Roman Selskyi, Emmanuil Mysko, Ivan Yakunin).

From 1957, he worked at the Lviv Experimental Ceramic and Sculptural Factory.

== Creativity ==
He works in the field of artistic ceramics, master of ceramic painting on decorative layers, plates, etc. He created souvenir mugs, jugs, flasks, vases, cups, ashtrays, souvenirs dedicated to the anniversaries of Lviv and Kyiv. His works are made of stoneware and metal using glazes, enamels, and salt in the techniques of embossing and electroplating. Among his works are:

- vases — "700-richchia Lvova" (1957), "Dynia" (1962), "Zakarpatska" (1963), "T. H. Shevchenko" (1964);
- kumantsi — "Hutsulskyi" (1959), "Yuvileinyi" (1964);
- decorative plates/panels — "Bandurystka" (1964), "Perebendia" (1964);
- bas-reliefs — "Banduryst" (1964), "Bandurystka" (1964), "Yuniste Karpat" (1968);
- compositions — "V sadu" (1997), "Try postati" (2001);
- decorative sculptures — "Prorok" (1998), "Kin" (2002).

He participated in national exhibitions since 1959 and international ones:

- Prague, Czechoslovakia (1968);
- Vallauris, France (1980).

A personal exhibition was held in Lviv on the artist's 50th anniversary in 1983.

The artist's works are kept in the collections of the Museum of Ethnography and Crafts, the Andrey Sheptytsky National Museum of Lviv, the National Folk Decorative Art Museum, and the Shevchenko National Reserve in Kaniv.

== Bibliography ==
- Чегусова З. А. Декоративне мистецтво України кінця ХХ століття. 200 імен: Альбом-каталог. — Київ, 2002.
