= Perehnoiv =

Perehnoiv Перегноїв
- Interactive map of Perehnoiv
- Coordinates: 49°48′29″N 24°34′29″E
- Country: Ukraine
- Oblast: Lviv Oblast
- Raion: Lviv Raion

Area
  - Total: 2.195 km^{2} (0.847 sq mi)

Population
  - Total: 822
- Time zone: UTC+2 (EET)
  - Summer (DST): UTC+3 (EEST)
- Postal code: 80722
- Area code: +380-3265

Perehnoiv (Ukrainian: Перегноїв, Polish: Przegnojów) is a village in Lviv Raion (district) of Lviv Oblast of western Ukraine. It belongs to Hlyniany hromada, one of the hromadas of Ukraine.

== History ==
The village was first mentioned in 1397.

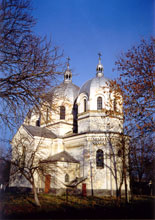
Presentation of Mary Church (1907) in Perehnoiv

Village "Prekgnoiowf" is displayed on the map of First Polish Republic region Ukraine (1650) by Guillaume Le Vasseur de Beauplan.

In 1726, wooden church was built in the village. The church was destroyed by the storm at the beginning of the 20th century.

New Presentation of Mary brick church was built in 1907 (architect Vasyl Nahirnyi).

In 1921 in Second Polish Republic, the village consisted of 228 households and 1,142 inhabitants, including 893 Ukrainians, 230 Poles, and 19 Jews. By 1931, the number of households had increased to 264, and the population to 1,286.
