= Hlyniany urban hromada =

Hromada in Lviv Oblast, Ukraine

Hlyniany urban hromada Глинянська міська громада
- Hromada
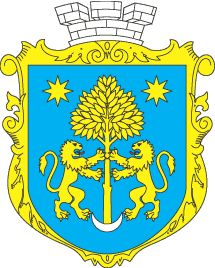
- Seal
- Interactive map of Hlyniany urban hromada
- Country: Ukraine
- Oblast: Lviv Oblast
- Raion: Lviv Raion
- Admin. center: Hlyniany

Area
  - Total: 223 km^{2} (86 sq mi)

Population (2021)
  - Total: 9,621
  - Density: 43.1/km^{2} (112/sq mi)
- CATOTTG code: UA46060050000016451
- Settlements: 19
- Cities: 1
- Villages: 18
- Website: hlyniany-rada.gov.ua

Hlyniany urban hromada (Ukrainian: Глинянська міська громада) is a hromada in Ukraine, in Lviv Raion of Lviv Oblast. The administrative center is the city of Hlyniany.

== Settlements ==
The hromada consists of 1 city (Hlyniany) and 18 villages:

- Velykyi Poliukhiv
- Vyzhniany
- Zheniv
- Zastavne
- Kosychi
- Kryvychi
- Kurovychi
- Maziv
- Perehnoiv
- Pecheniia
- Pidhaichyky
- Pohoriltsi
- Rozvoriany
- Slovita
- Solova
- Turkotyn
- Shopky
- Yaktoriv
