= Hlyniany =

City in Lviv Oblast, Ukraine

Hlyniany Глиняни
- City
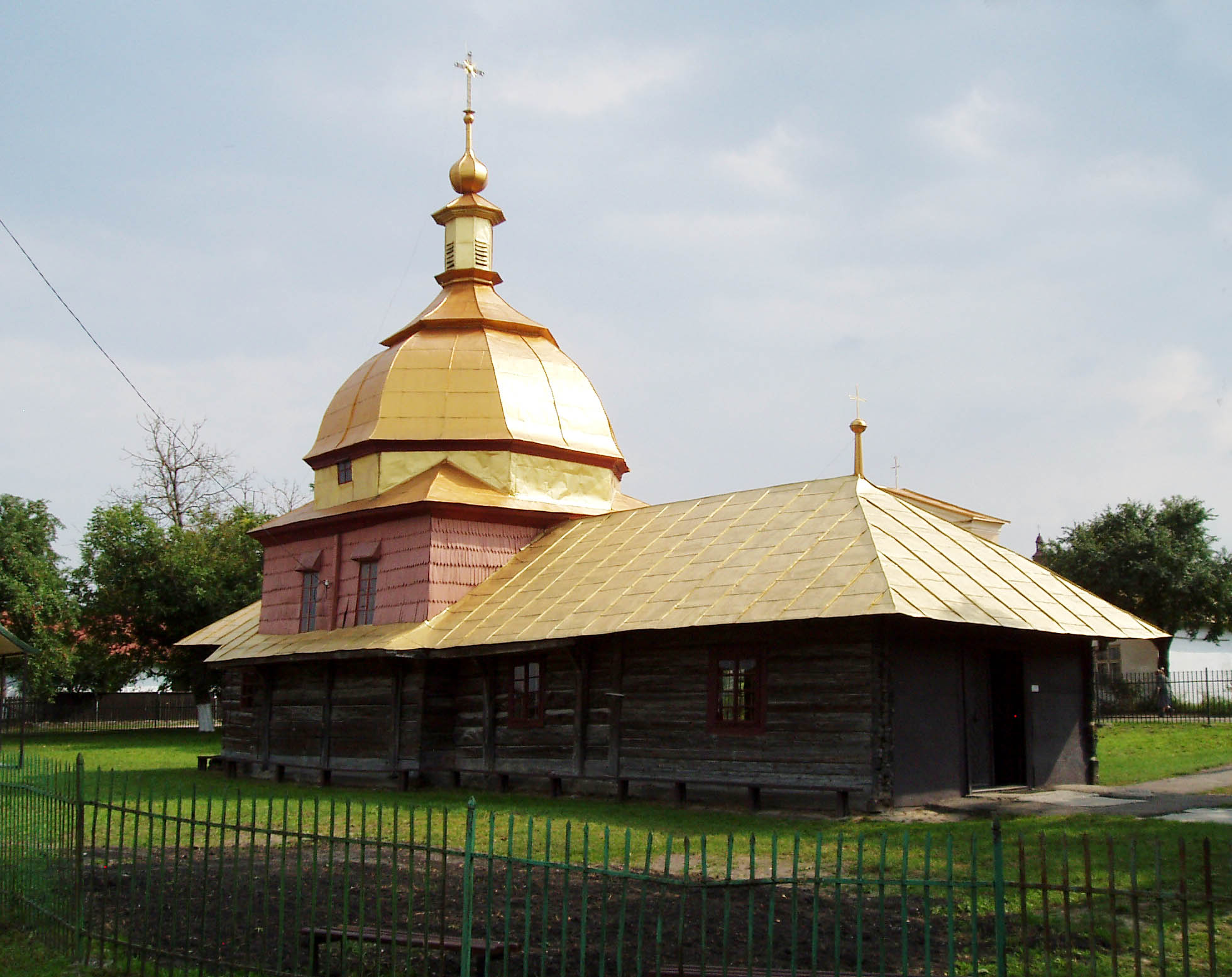
- Dormition of the Mother of God Church

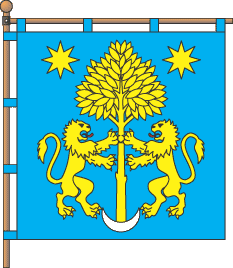
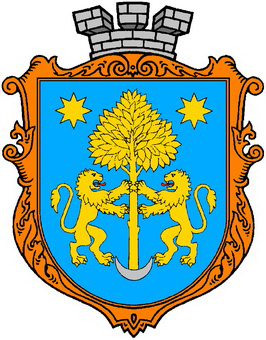
- Flag Coat of arms

- Location within Lviv Oblast Location within Ukraine
- Coordinates: 49°49′24″N 24°31′00″E
- Country: Ukraine
- Oblast: Lviv Oblast
- Raion: Lviv Raion
- Hromada: Hlyniany urban hromada

Area
  - Total: 5.45 km^{2} (2.10 sq mi)

Population (2024)
  - Total: 2,928
- Time zone: UTC+2 (EET)
  - Summer (DST): UTC+3 (EEST)
- Postal code: 80720
- Area code: +380-3265

Hlyniany (Ukrainian: Глиняни, IPA: [ɦlɪˈnʲɑnɪ]; Polish: Gliniany; Yiddish: גלינא Glina) is a small city in Lviv Raion, Lviv Oblast (region) of Ukraine. It hosts the administration of Hlyniany urban hromada, one of the hromadas of Ukraine. Population: 2,954 (2022 estimate).

== History ==
In 1340, together with whole Red Ruthenia, Hlyniany became part of the Kingdom of Poland, where it remained until 1772 (see Partitions of Poland). The village, called Gliniany, belonged to Lwow Land of the Ruthenian Voivodeship. It received a town charter in 1397, from Voivode of Sandomierz and Starosta of Red Ruthenia, Jan z Tarnowa. In 1425, King Wladyslaw Jagiello confirmed Gliniany's charter. In summer 1537, it was one of the centers of the so-called Chicken War.

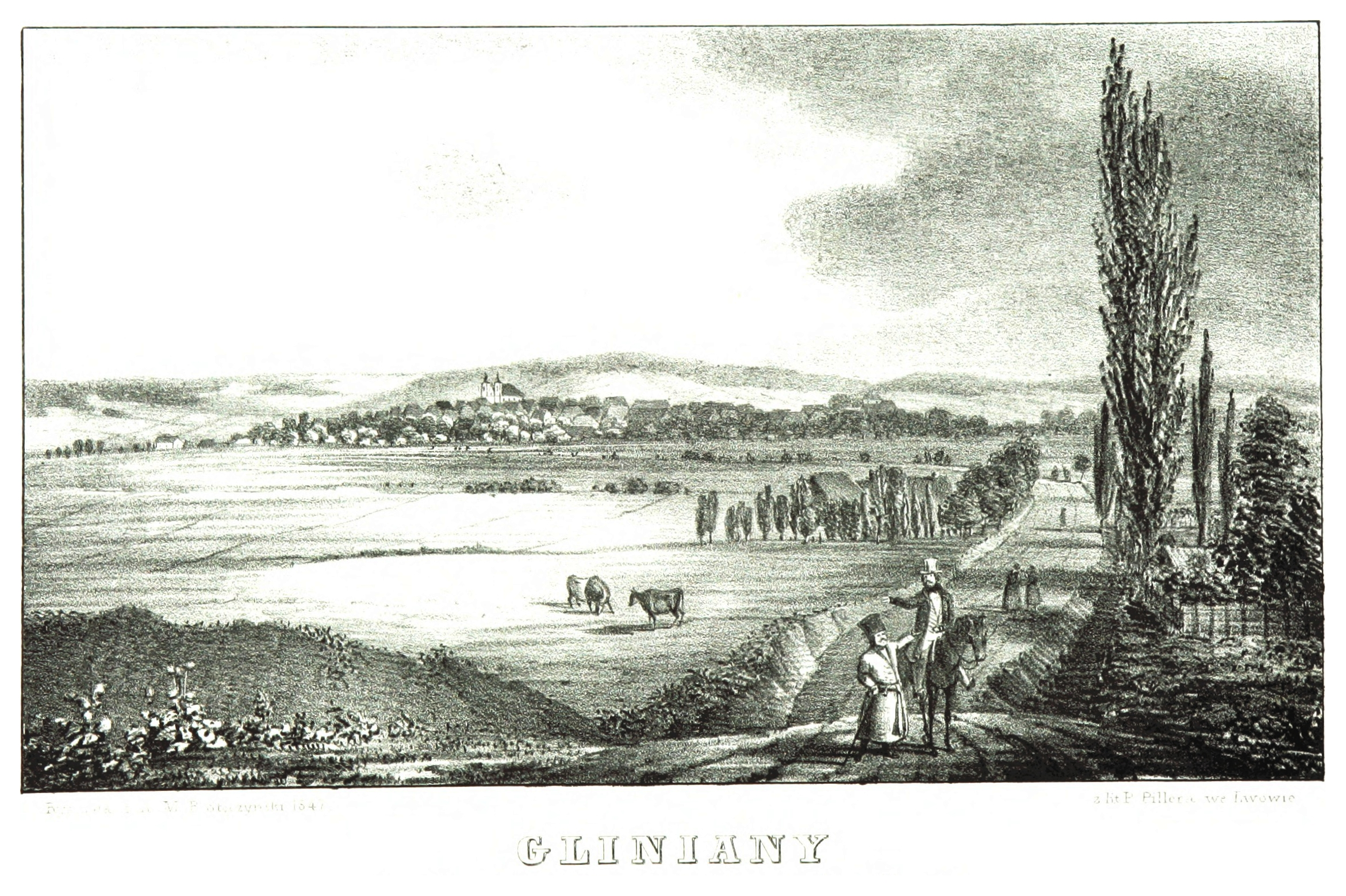
View of the town during the mid-19th century

In 1772 Gliniany became part of Austria's province of Galicia, in the Bezirkshauptmannshaft (District) of Przemyslany where it remained until late 1918. During the Polish-Ukrainian War of 1919 the town became a site of battles between the Ukrainian Galician Army and Polish troops. In the interbellum period, it belonged to the Second Polish Republic, as part of Przemyslany County, Tarnopol Voivodeship. In October 1939, Gliniany was annexed by the Soviet Union into the Ukrainian Soviet Socialist Republic as part of the Soviet annexation of Eastern Galicia and Volhynia and renamed to Hlyniany. Upon the dissolution of the Soviet Union in 1991, Hlyniany was part of the Lviv Oblast in Ukraine.

The Jewish population was 2,418 in 1910. In 1931 the total population of Hlyniany consisted of 4,500 inhabitants. In 1940-1961 it was a district center.

Until 18 July 2020, Hlyniany belonged to Zolochiv Raion. In July 2020, as part of the administrative reform of Ukraine, which reduced the number of raions of Lviv Oblast to seven, Hlyniany was transferred to Lviv Raion.

== Economy ==
Hlyniany has been historically known as a centre of food industry and rug production.

== Gallery ==
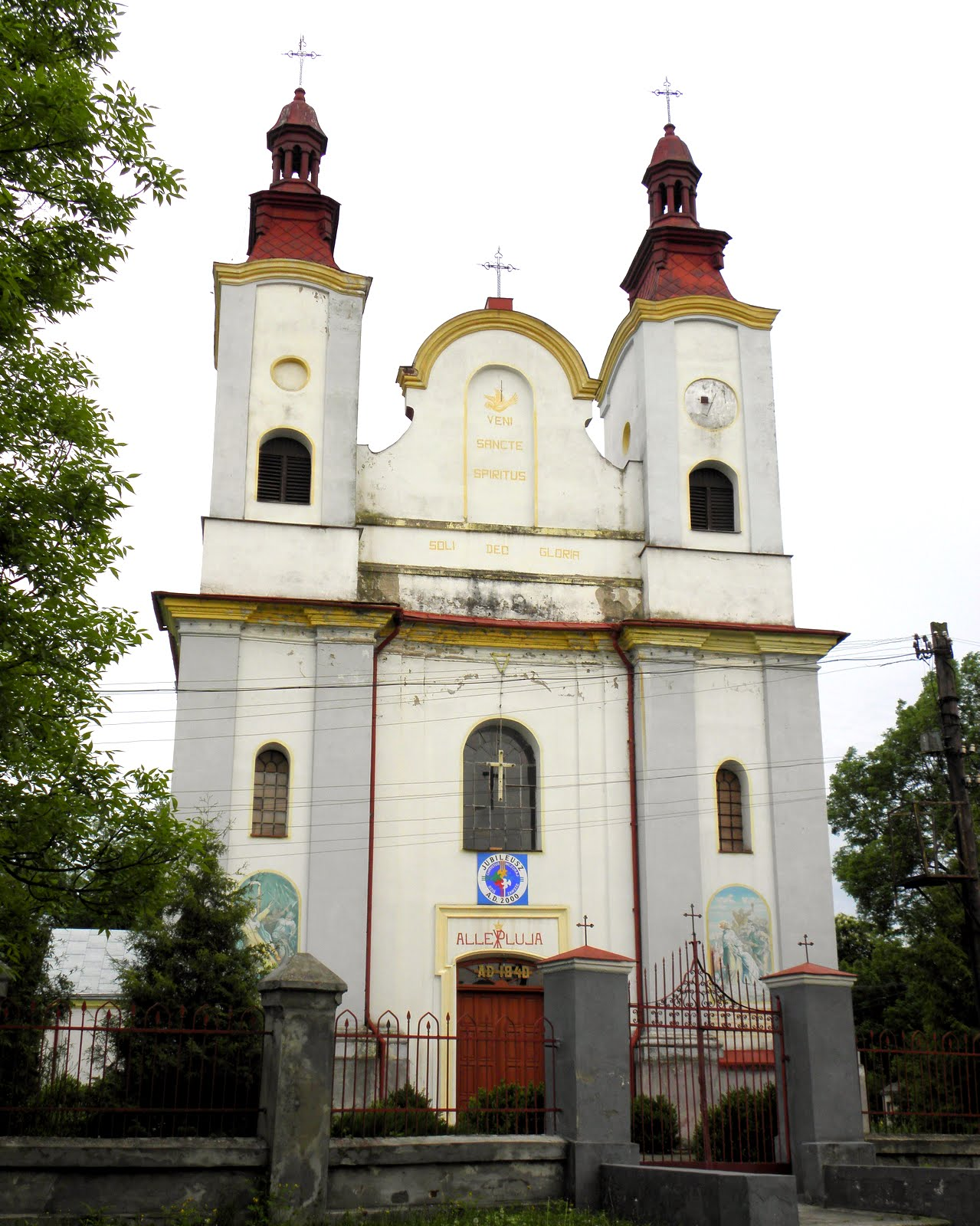
Holy Spirit Church

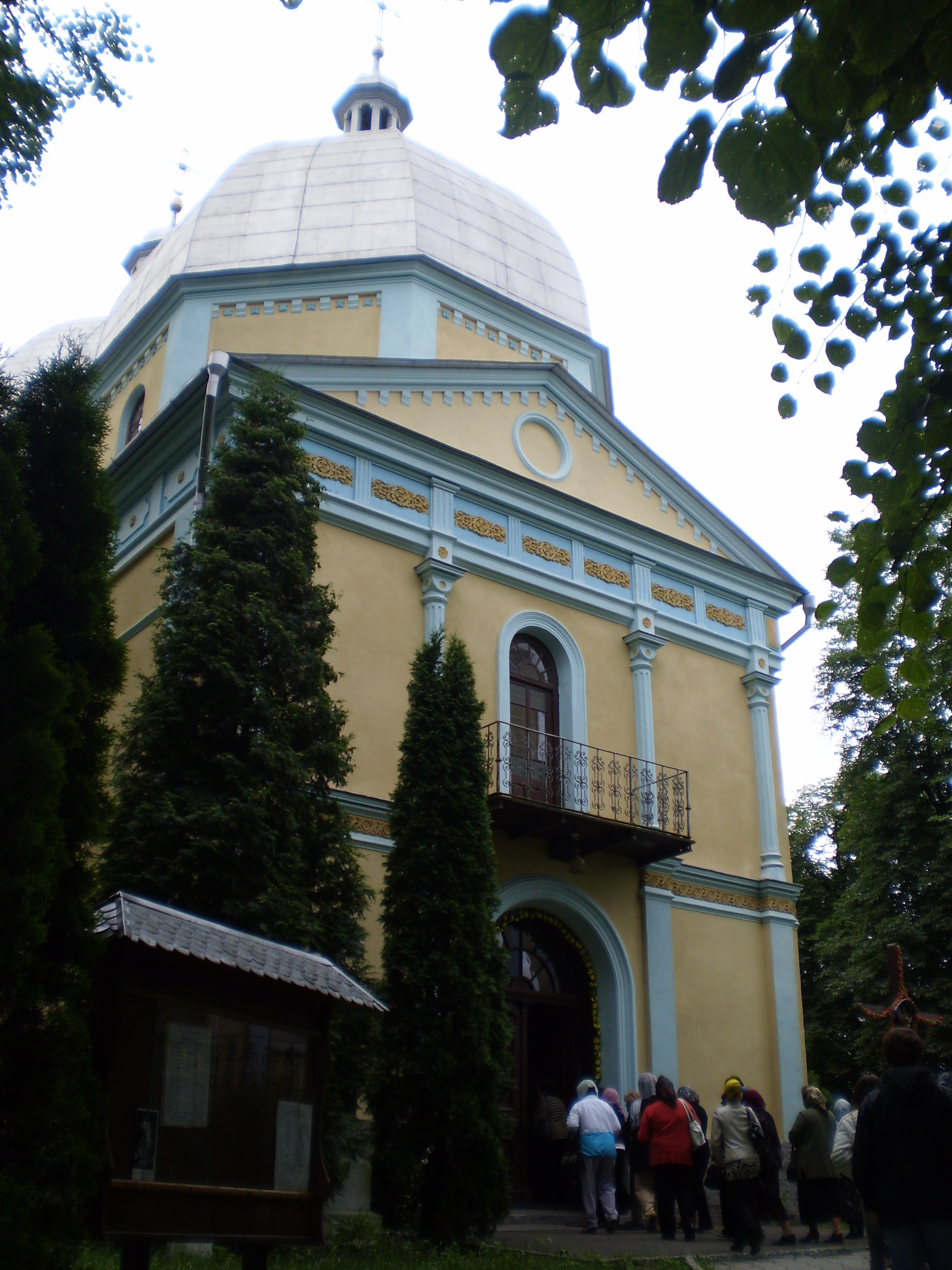
Saint Nicholas Church

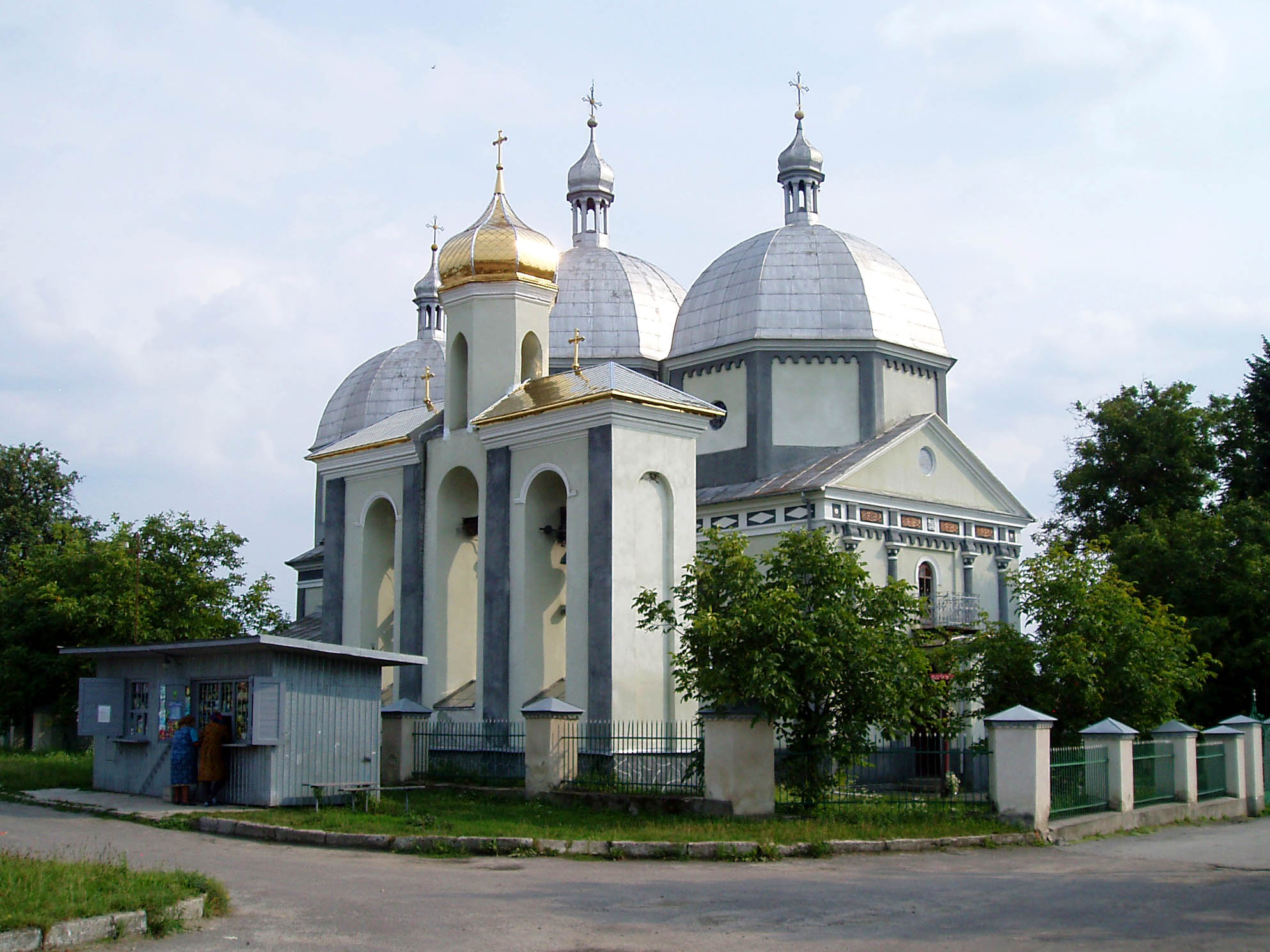
Saint Anne Church

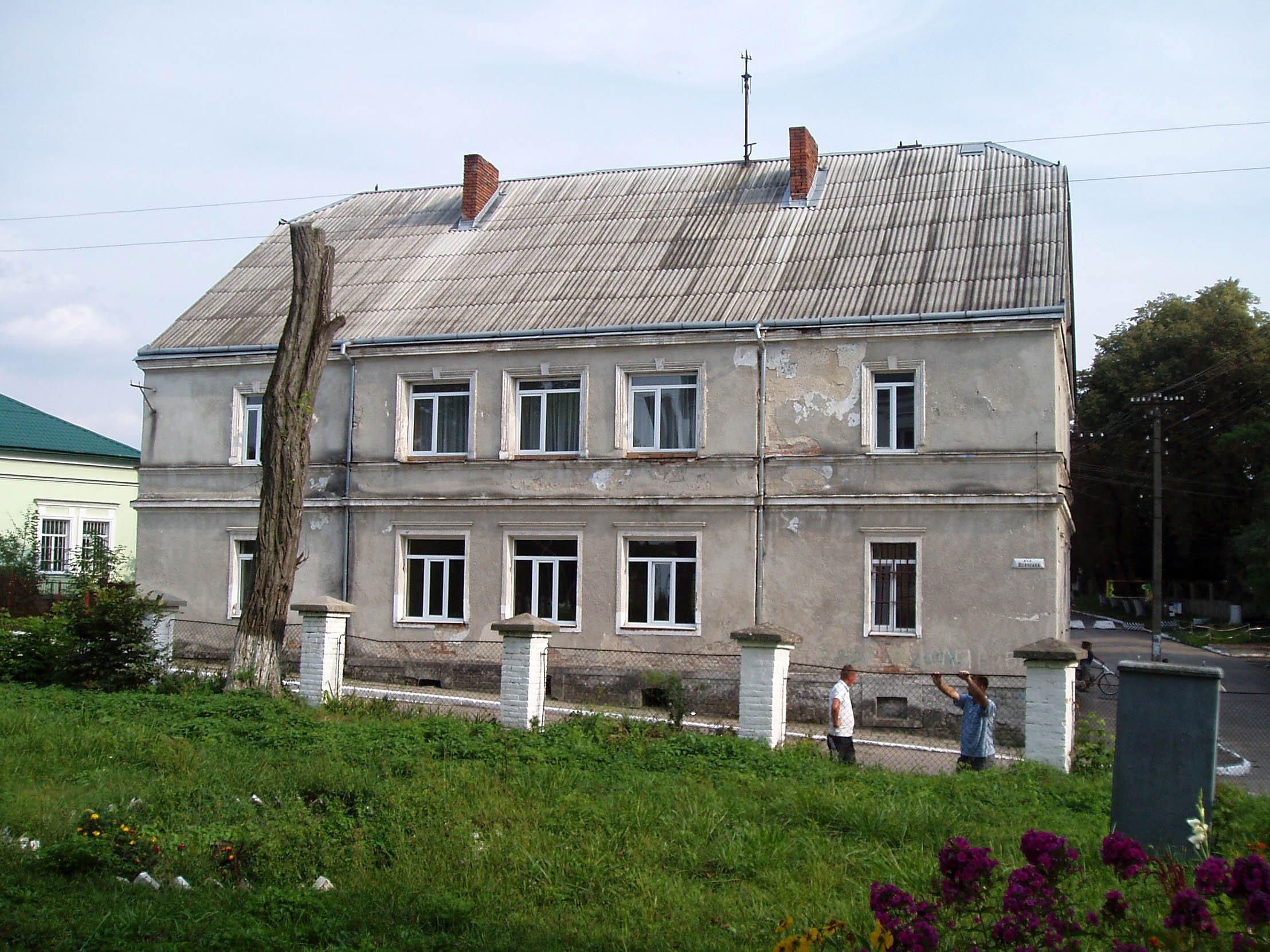
Musical school

== See also ==
- Hlyniany Gate
