= Andrzej Bemer =

17th-century Polish sculptor and architect

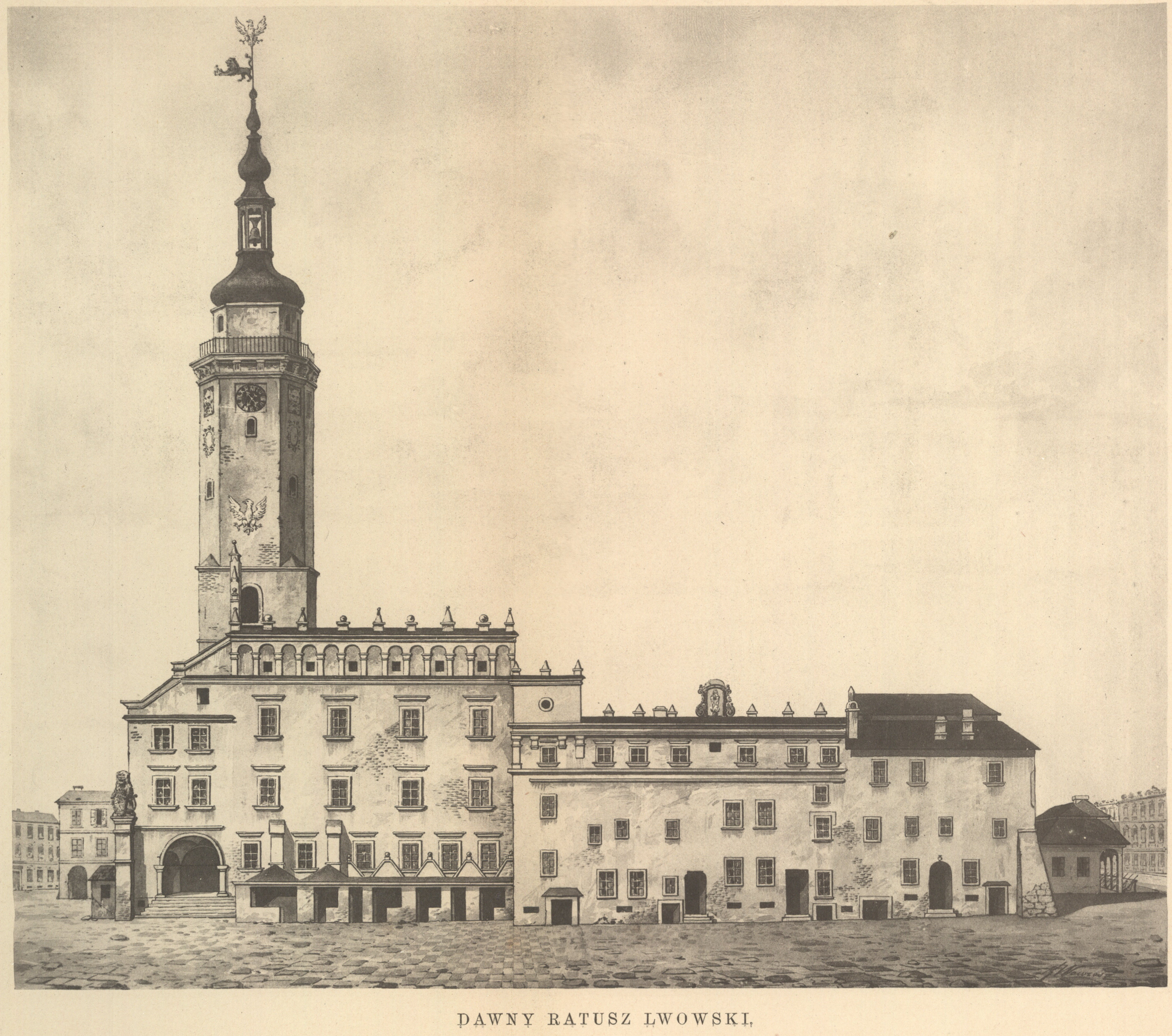
Lviv town hall, before 1826

Andrzej Bemer (German: Andreas Bemer; died ca. 1626) was a 17th-century sculptor and architect, active in Poland and in Silesia, probably of German or Czech ancestry. Born in Breslau, early in his career he moved to Lesser Poland. There he authored or co-authored numerous churches and chapels. Among them are the Bernardine Church, the Chapel of Boim family (attributed) and the town hall's tower, all located in Lwów (modern Lviv, Ukraine).
