= Hlyniany Gate =

Gates in Lviv, Ukraine

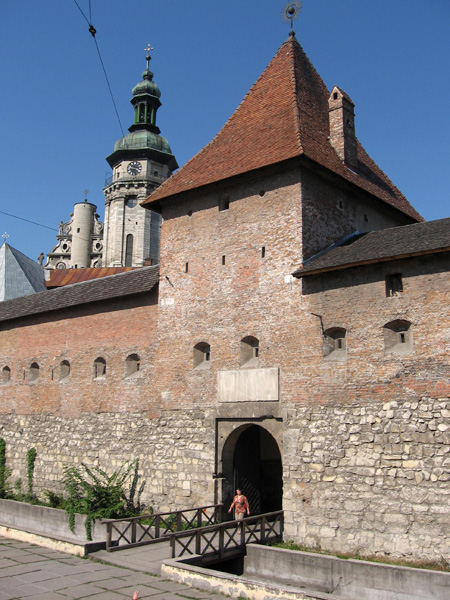
- Hlyniany Gate as seen from western entrance

Immovable Monument of Local Significance of Ukraine
- Official name: Оборонні мури з в'їздовою вежею (Defensive walls with the entrance tower)
- Type: Architecture
- Reference no.: 5327-Лв

Hlyniany Gate (Ukrainian: Глинянська брама; Polish: Brama Gliniańska) is the focal point of the few remaining fortifications in Lviv, Ukraine. It was built in 1618 in the late Renaissance era in Lviv, by Fryderyk Getkant. The designs were created in order to defend the approach from Hlyniany and to defend the part of Lviv from Western European armies. The outer moat and the wooden galleries on the inside are the upshot of a 1970s reconstruction. The gate is located in the entrance to the Bernardine Monastery, which was built in the 19th century to be defended by the Gate.

In the plans for 2018 to update the space under the Hlyniany Gate, namely, the moat under the gate, which simulates a defensive structure, it is planned to fill it with water and install a very flat fountain, and conditions for pedestrians should be improved on the pedestrian area. In May 2018, the wooden bridge at the gate of the Hlyniany Tower, which leads from the Bernardyn Dvoryk to Mytna Square, was already repaired.
