= Lviv Town Hall =

Coordinates: 49°50′31″N 24°01′54″E

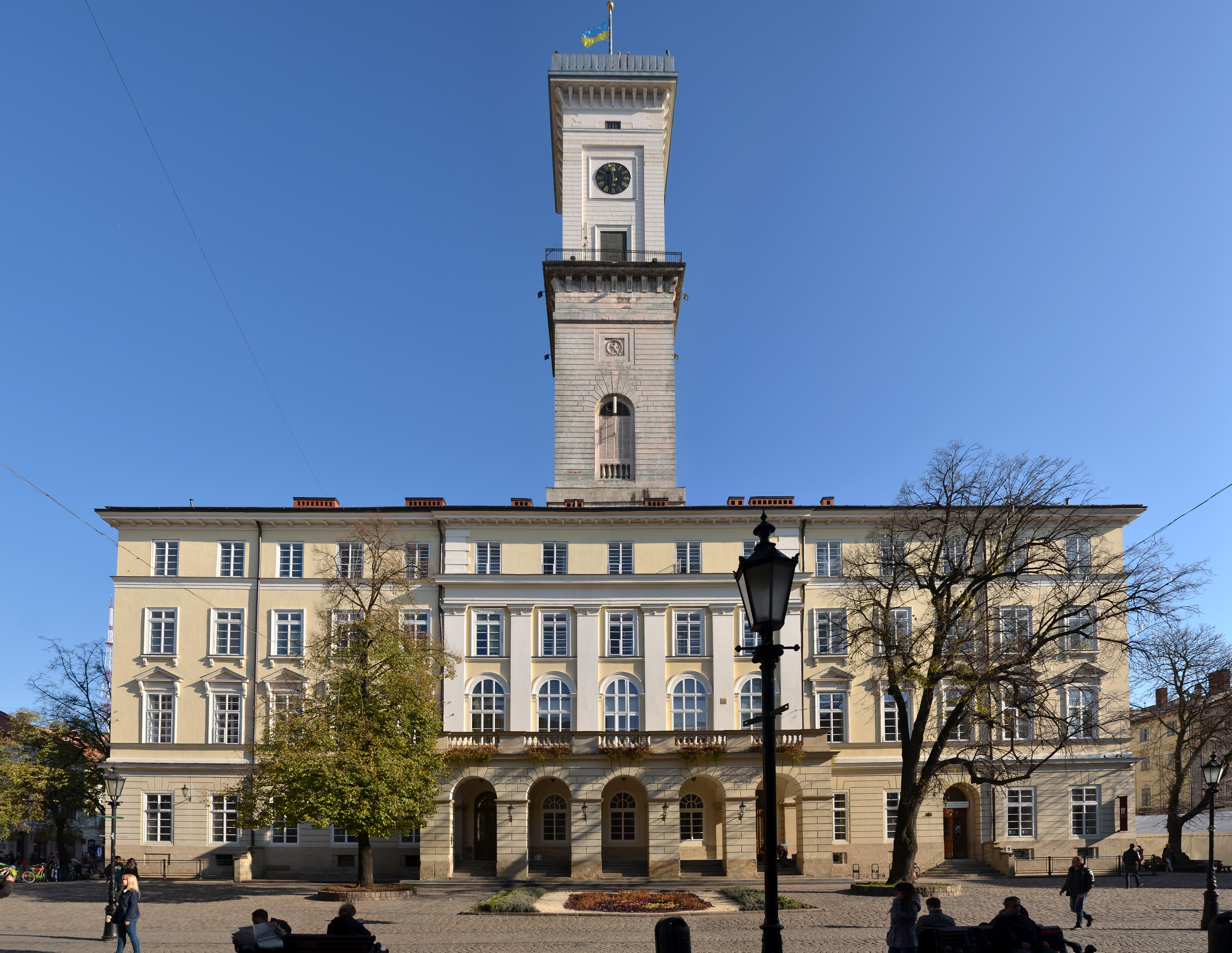
- 1 Market Square, Lviv
- Interactive map of the Lviv Town Hall area

General information
- Location: Lviv, Ukraine
- Construction started: 1827
- Completed: 1835

Height
- Height: 65 m

The city of Lviv, Ukraine has had a series of town hall buildings since approximately 1357. These have for centuries been recognized landmarks of the community. The modern building located at 1 Market Square is the residence of the Lviv City Council. It is included into a UNESCO World Heritage list as part of the Historic City Centre Ensemble.

== Medieval Town Hall ==
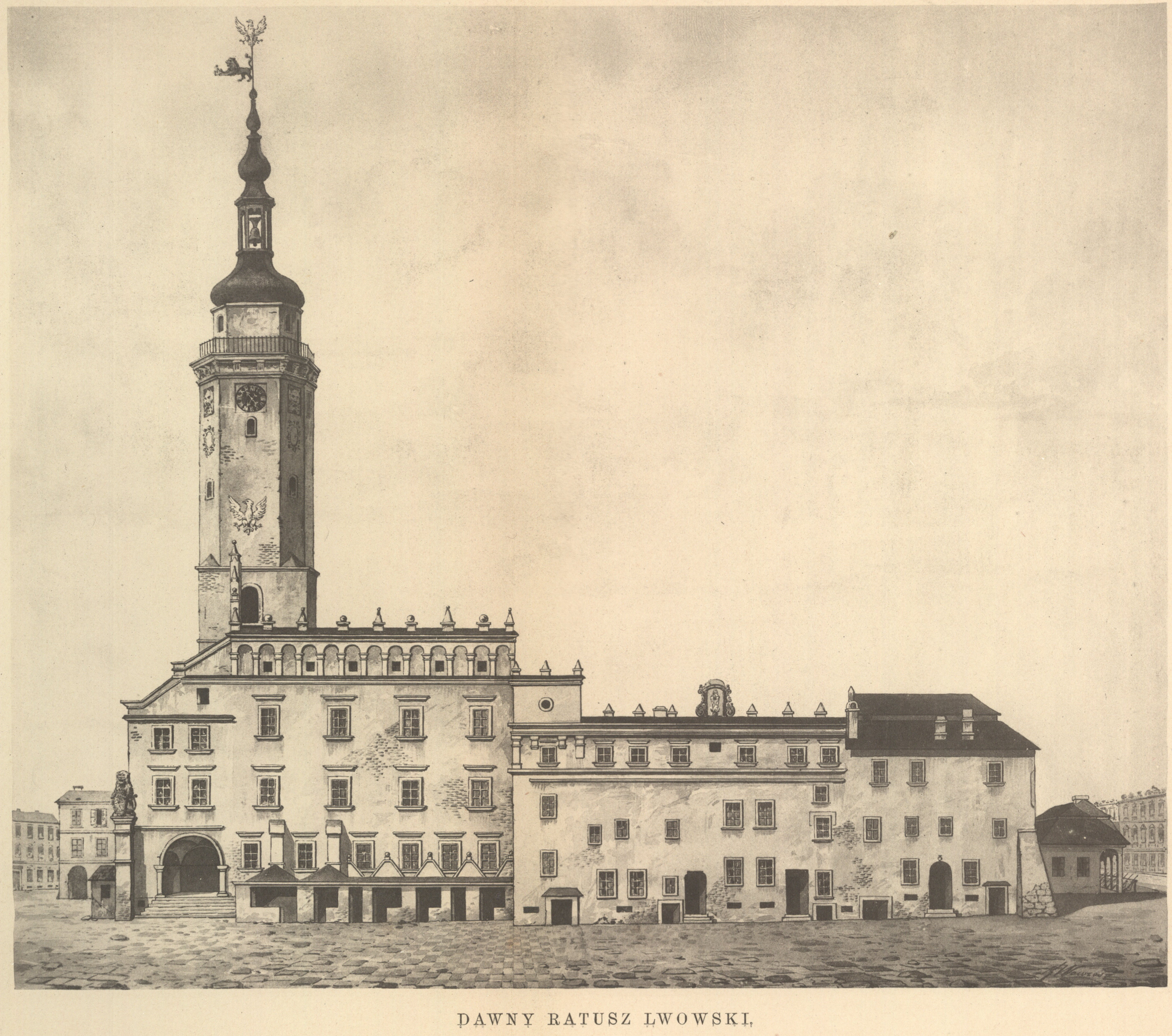
The old city hall as it looked in the early 19th century

The first town hall in Lviv appeared shortly after the city had received Magdeburg rights in 1357. The building was made of wood and burned down in 1381. After the fire the construction of a stone town hall was started. By the end of the Middle Ages, the Lviv city hall was a conglomeration of buildings. The middle part of the building was its oldest part, dating from the 14th century. The western part was built in the years 1491–1504. The dominant feature of the composition was the tallest tower, topped by a mannerist shako (1619, architect Andrzej Bemer).

== Modern building ==
A new tower was laid in 1827 and built between 1830 and 1835 following a Viennese Classical style. Authors of the project were architects: Alois Wondraszka, Jerzy Głogowski, Joseph Markl and Franz Trescher. The City Hall is a four-story building with a patio, and features a town hall clock tower.

On 25 June 1848 two blue and yellow banners were hung on the building, the first verifiably documented use of the current yellow-and-blue flag of Ukraine. It is unknown who hang the banners and the Austrian authorities (current Lviv was then named Lemberg and situated in the Austrian Empire) dissociated themselves from this action, as did the Supreme Ruthenian Council (a Ukrainian political organization). The banners hung for almost a week. At the request of the Supreme Ruthenian Council, on 15 May 1849 a yellow-and-blue flag hang again on the building, this time for one day.

In 1848, during the revolutionary events in Lviv city center the original clock tower collapsed. In 1851, the building was repaired.

Since 1939, the building has been housing the Lviv City Council.

Since 2000, the Town Hall and its tower is open for entrance.
