= Vasyl Kuybida =

Ukrainian politician

- Василь Куйбіда
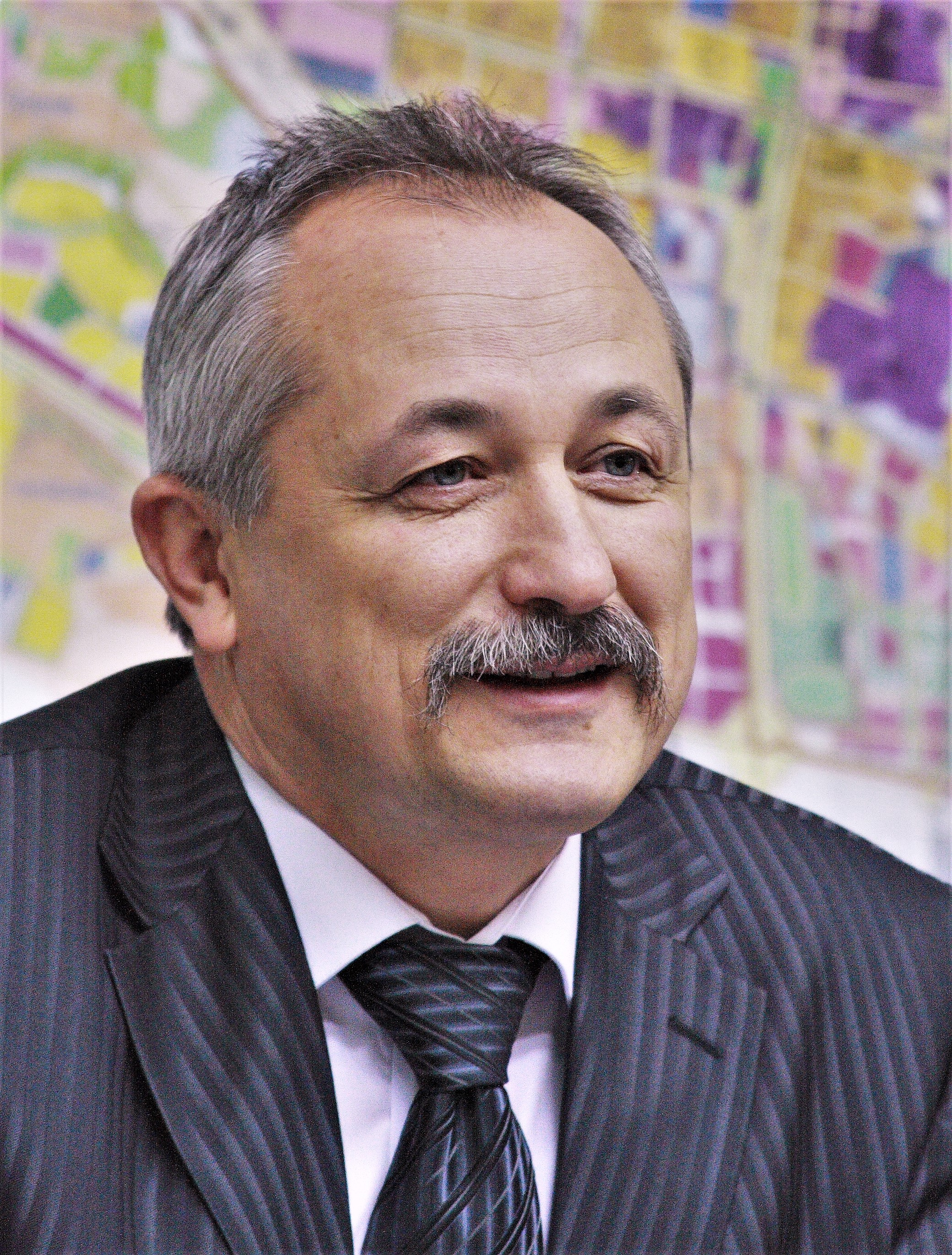
- Kuybida in 2009

Minister of Regional Development and Construction
- In office 18 December 2007 – 11 March 2010
- President: Viktor Yushchenko
- Prime Minister: Yulia Tymoshenko
- Preceded by: Volodymyr Yatsuba
- Succeeded by: Volodymyr Yatsuba

Mayor of Lviv
- In office 1994–2002
- Preceded by: Vasyl Shpitser
- Succeeded by: Liubomyr Buniak

People's Deputy of Ukraine
- In office 23 November 2007 – 19 December 2007
- Constituency: Our Ukraine–People's Self-Defense Bloc, No. 26
- In office 25 May 2006 – 15 June 2007
- Constituency: Our Ukraine Bloc, No. 17

Personal details
- Born: 8 May 1958 (age 68) Inta, Komi ASSR, Russian SFSR, Soviet Union (now Komi Republic, Russia)
- Party: People's Movement of Ukraine
- Other political affiliations: Our Ukraine–People's Self-Defense Bloc
- Education: University of Lviv

Vasyl Stepanovych Kuybida (Ukrainian: Василь Степанович Куйбіда; born 8 May 1958) is a Ukrainian politician who served as Minister of Regional Development and Construction from 2007 to 2010. Prior to serving as minister, he was also mayor of Lviv from 1994 to 2002 and a People's Deputy of Ukraine from Our Ukraine–People's Self-Defense Bloc from 2006 to mid-2007 and then again for a brief period in 2007. He was also a candidate for president during the 2014 Ukrainian presidential election, receiving 0.06% of the vote.

== Early life and career ==
Vasyl Stepanovych Kuybida was born on 8 May 1958 in the city of Inta, in the Komi Autonomous Soviet Socialist Republic within the Russian Soviet Federative Socialist Republic. His parents lived on a special settlement. From 1975 to 1980 Kuybida studied at the University of Lviv's faculty of applied mathematics and mechanics, graduating with a specialty in applied mathematics.

== Political career ==
He has been elected to the Verhovna Rada two times (in 2006 and 2007). In 1994-2002 Kuybida was mayor of Lviv, in 2007-10 - Minister of Regional Development and Construction. Initiator and coauthor of the UNESCO program Lviv - Historic Center. Since 2012 Kuybida was elected the leader of People's Movement of Ukraine.

In the 2014 Ukrainian presidential election Kuybida received 0.06% of the vote. He described his top priorities as "further strengthening and development of the democratic roots of Ukrainian national statehood; implementing the ideas of democracy, pluralism, social solidarity, and open society, rebuilding the national economy on the principles of a freely competitive market system, facilitating the development of private entrepreneurship, systemic agrarian reform, ensuring social security for every citizen, social assistance for those in need, pension reform, the cultural revival of Ukrainian society, of the Ukrainian people's national identity, of the Ukrainian language in all spheres of public life, and integration into the EU and NATO as a vital cornerstone of Ukraine's foreign policy."

== See also ==
- List of mayors of Lviv

Political offices
Preceded by Vasyl Shpitser	Mayor of Lviv; 1994–2002	Succeeded by Lyubomyr Bunyak
Preceded by Borys Tarasyuk	Leader of People's Movement of Ukraine; 2012–2017	Succeeded by Viktor Kryvenko
