= Zoia Chehusova =

Ukrainian art historian and critic (born 1953)

- Зоя Анатоліївна Чегусова
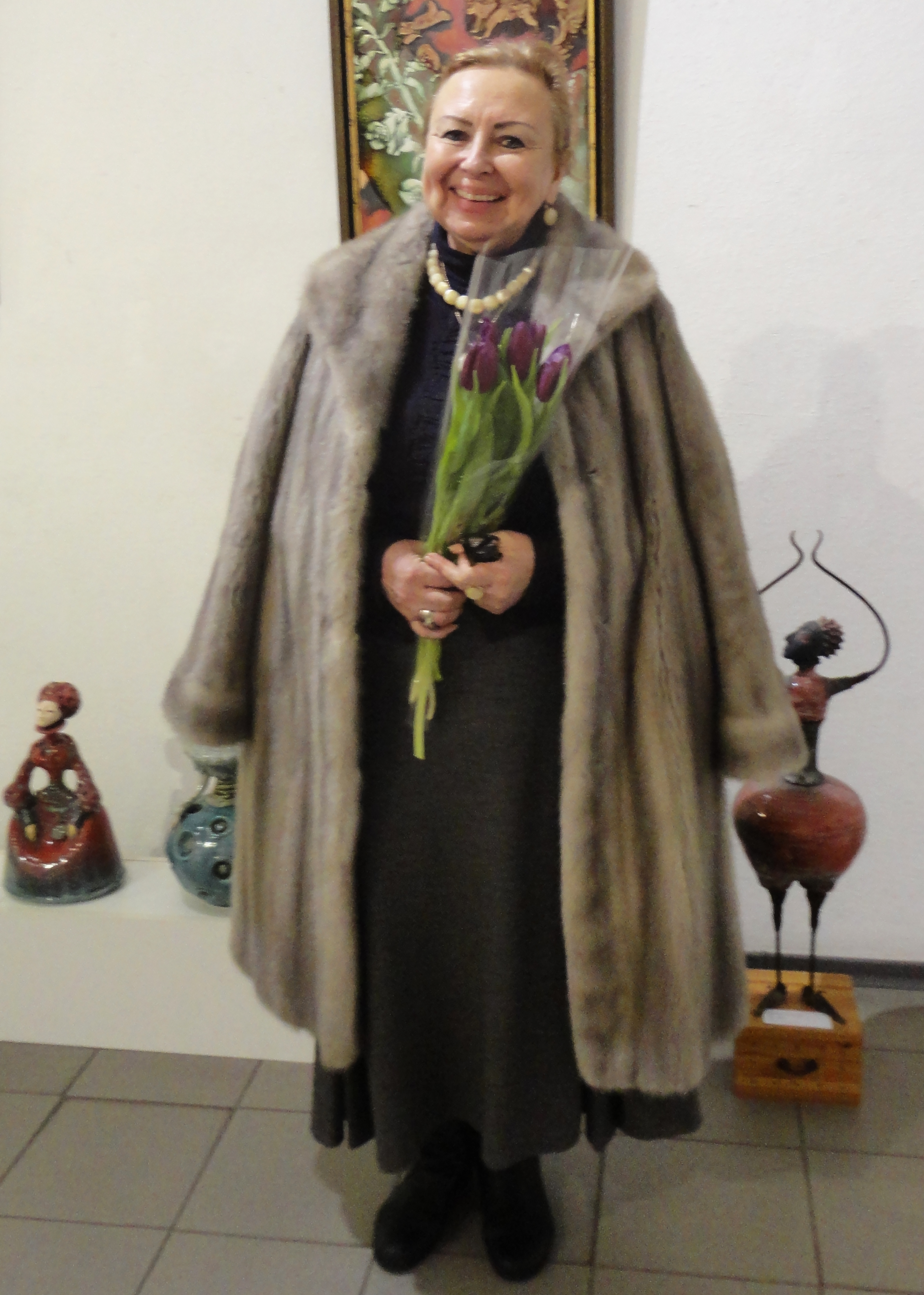
- Born: 31 July 1953 (age 73); Kyiv
- Education: Kyiv Art Institute
- Occupations: Art historian, art critic
- Awards: Order of Princess Olga; Merited Figure of Arts of Ukraine; Shevchenko National Prize

Zoia Chehusova (Ukrainian: Зоя Анатоліївна Чегусова; born 31 July 1953 in Kyiv) is a Ukrainian art historian, art critic, candidate of art history, president of the Ukrainian section of the International Association of Art Critics under the auspices of UNESCO (2005–2021).

== Biography ==
In 1975, she graduated from the Kyiv Art Institute with a degree in art theory and history. She studied under Leonid Vladych, Liudmila Miliaieva, and Anna Zavarova. From 1979 to 1982, she studied at the Ukrainian Regional Research and Design Institute for Civil Engineering.

From 1975, she worked at the Ukrainian Zonal Research and Design Institute for Civil Engineering in the department, and later at the Research Center for Monumental and Decorative Arts as an art historian, junior research fellow, and, from 1983, senior research fellow. From 1992 to 1996, she was deputy director of the center.

From 1984, he has been a member of the National Union of Artists of Ukraine, and from 1989, a member of the bureau, deputy chairman of the criticism and art history section of the Kyiv organization of the National Union of Artists of Ukraine, and an honorary member of the decorative and applied arts section of the Kyiv organization of the National Union of Artists of Ukraine.

From 1989 to 1992, he taught a course on the history of foreign decorative and applied arts at the Kyiv Art Institute, and from 1996 to 1998, he taught the same course at Kyiv Slavonic University.

From 2001 – member and scientific secretary of the International Association of Art Critics under the auspices of UNESCO.

From 2003, he has been a research fellow in the Department of Decorative Arts, and from 2016, he has been a senior research fellow in the Department of Fine and Decorative Arts at the Rylsky Institute of Art Studies, Folklore and Ethnology of the National Academy of Sciences of Ukraine.

From 2004, he curated the First, Second, Third, and Fourth All-Ukrainian Triennials of Artistic Textiles under the auspices of the National Union of Artists of Ukraine (2004, 2007, 2010, 2013).

From 2005 to 2021, he was President of the Ukrainian section of the International Association of Art Critics (AICA, UNESCO, Paris).

From 2005, as a member of the Creative Association "Svitlyna" of the Women's Union of Kyiv, she has been actively involved in all charity events and artistic activities of this organization in Ukraine.

=== Cooperation with publications ===
Chehusova, a leading Ukrainian art historian, is the author of about 500 published art history works in domestic and foreign publications, which promote and popularize the work of leading masters of contemporary ceramics, glass, textiles, metal, and wood in Ukraine. including two individual and 14 collective fundamental monographs. From 1978, she has been published in the magazines "Obrazotvorche Mystetstvo", "Ukraine", "President", "Academy", "Ukrainian Art", "Design Aspect", "A. S. S.", "Airport", "Art Ukraine", Fine Art, and in the newspapers Dzerkalo Tyzhnia, Metro, Kyiv Weekly, and others.

Member of the editorial boards of journals: "Ukrainske Mystetstvo" from 2003, "Obrazotvorche Mystetstvo" from 2006, the journal "Fine Art" from 2007, and author of articles for the Encyclopedia of Modern Ukraine [5][6].

== Works ==
- "Mystetstvo Ukrainy XX stolittia" (co-authored, 1998)
- "Dekoratyvne mystetstvo Ukrainy kintsia XX stolittia. 200 imen" (2002)
- "Mystetstvo Ukrainy. 1991—2003" (co-authored, 2003)
- Exhibition catalog dedicated to the 50th anniversary of Ukraine's accession to UNESCO in Paris "Suchasne dekoratyvne mystetstvo Ukrainy" (2004)
- "Dekoratyvne mystetstvo Ukrainy XX stolittia. U poshukakh 'velykoho styliu'" (co-authored, 2005)
- "Istoriia ukrainskoho mystetstva. ХХ stolittia". Volume Five (co-authored, 2007)
- "Liudmyla Zhohol. Charivnytsia khudozhnoho tekstyliu" (co-authored, 2008) and others.
- History of Decorative Art of Ukraine. XX Century» Volume 5. Executive Secretary and author of 8 chapters of the 5th volume: "Peredmova", "Monumentalno-dekoratyvna keramika", "Khudozhnia keramika (1990-2010-ti roky", "Lvivske khudozhnie sklo", "Khudozhnia obrobka dereva. Lozopletinnia", "Novitnii tekstyl. 2000-ni roky" (co-authored), "Rozpysnyi tekstyl u hromadskomu interʼieri" (co-authored), "Pisliamova" (2016).
- "Dekoratyvne mystetstvo v Ukraini kintsia ХХ-pochatku ХХІ stolittia: problemy zberezhennia natsionalnoi svoieridnosti v umovakh hlobalizatsii" (co-authored, 2019).
- "Dekoratyvne mystetstvo Ukrainy kriz viky" (co-authored, 2019).
- "Dekoratyvne mystetstvo Ukrainy ІХ-pochaktu ХІ st.: stylovi transformatsii, khudozhni interpretatsii, zahalnoyevropeiskyi kontekst" (co-authored, 2019).
- "Profesiine dekoratyvne mystetstvo Ukrainy doby hlobalizatsii" (2023)

== Awards ==
- Gratitude from the Board of the Kyiv Organization of the National Union of Artists of Ukraine for the development and implementation of the author's art project "Dekoratyvne mystetstvo Ukrainy kintsia XX stolittia. 200 imen" (2003)
- Gratitude from the Kyiv City Mayor "For diligent work and active civic stance" (2006)
- Laureate of the Taras Shevchenko National Prize of Ukraine (2006, for the album-catalog "Dekoratyvne mystetstvo Ukrainy kintsia XX stolittia. 200 imen")
- Merited Figure of Arts of Ukraine (2007)
- Certificate of Merit from the Permanent Mission of Ukraine to the United Nations for significant support and promotion of Ukrainian culture and arts at the United Nations and in the United States of America (2009)
- Certificate of Honor from the National Union of Artists of Ukraine for a significant contribution to the development and popularization of Ukrainian decorative art in Ukraine and abroad (2010)
- Order of Princess Olga, 3rd class (2013)
- Laureate of the Kyiv Regional Organization of the National Union of Artists of Ukraine Platon Biletskyi Prize (2017)

== Bibliography ==
- Чегусова Зоя Анатоліївна // сайт Інституту мистецтвознавства, фольклористики та етнології ім. М. Т. Рильського.
