= Horodotska Street =

Street in Lviv, Ukraine

Coordinates: 49°50′25″N 24°00′45″E

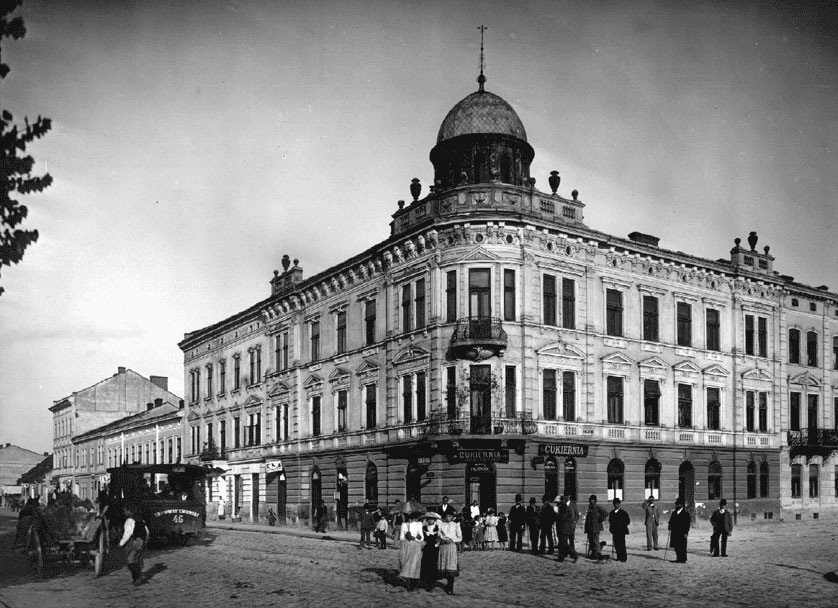
- An historical image of the street in what is today's Halytskyi District, 1896
- Interactive map of Horodotska Street
- Native name: Вулиця Городоцька (Ukrainian)
- Former names: Grüdekerstraße; Ulica Gródecka; Reichsstraße (1941-1944)
- Part of: Lviv
- Namesake: Horodok
- Length: 8,530 m (27,990 ft)
- Area: Halytskyi; Franko; Zaliznychnyi District

Horodotska Street (ukr. Вулиця Городоцька) is the longest street in the city of Lviv, Ukraine. Its total length is over 8.5 kilometres (5.3 mi). It begins in the historic center, runs through the territory of the city's Halytskyi, Franko and Zaliznychnyi districts, and ends on the outskirts of the city. The street is of exceptional transport importance, as it is the main highway of Lviv in the western direction. The design of the street varies along its length, including a range of architectural styles, from historicism, secession, constructivism, and modernist housing and industrial architecture. Several houses on Horodotska Street have the status of architectural monuments of local significance.

== Main buildings ==
A number of important buildings are located on Horodotska Street. It begins with the Magnus shopping center, built 1912–1913, which is the first example of Lviv constructivism. The oldest Lviv prison, Brygidki, is also located on Horodotska Street, and is now the Lviv Remand Prison. In the future it is planned to move it to another location. Horodotska 26 is the building of the Lviv State University of Internal Affairs. At the crossroads of Horodotska and Shevchenko streets is the Church of St. Anne, at Horodotska 32, and at Horodotska 36 is the Lviv Drama Theater named after Lesia Ukrainka. Also on Horodotska Street is the Lviv State Circus, the Railway Station Market, the Lviv Suburban Station, and the tram depot N1.

== Transport ==
Horodotska Street is of exceptional importance in the city's transport system along its entire length. It is used by all types of public transport: trams, trolleybuses and shuttle buses. The oldest tram depot N1 in Lviv is also located on Horodotska Street. When the first electric tram track was laid in Lviv in 1895, part of the section was laid across Horodotska Street. When trolleybus traffic was introduced in Lviv in 1952, a trolleybus line also appeared on Horodotska Street. Lviv's Suburban Railway Station is also located on Horodotska Street.

== Gallery ==
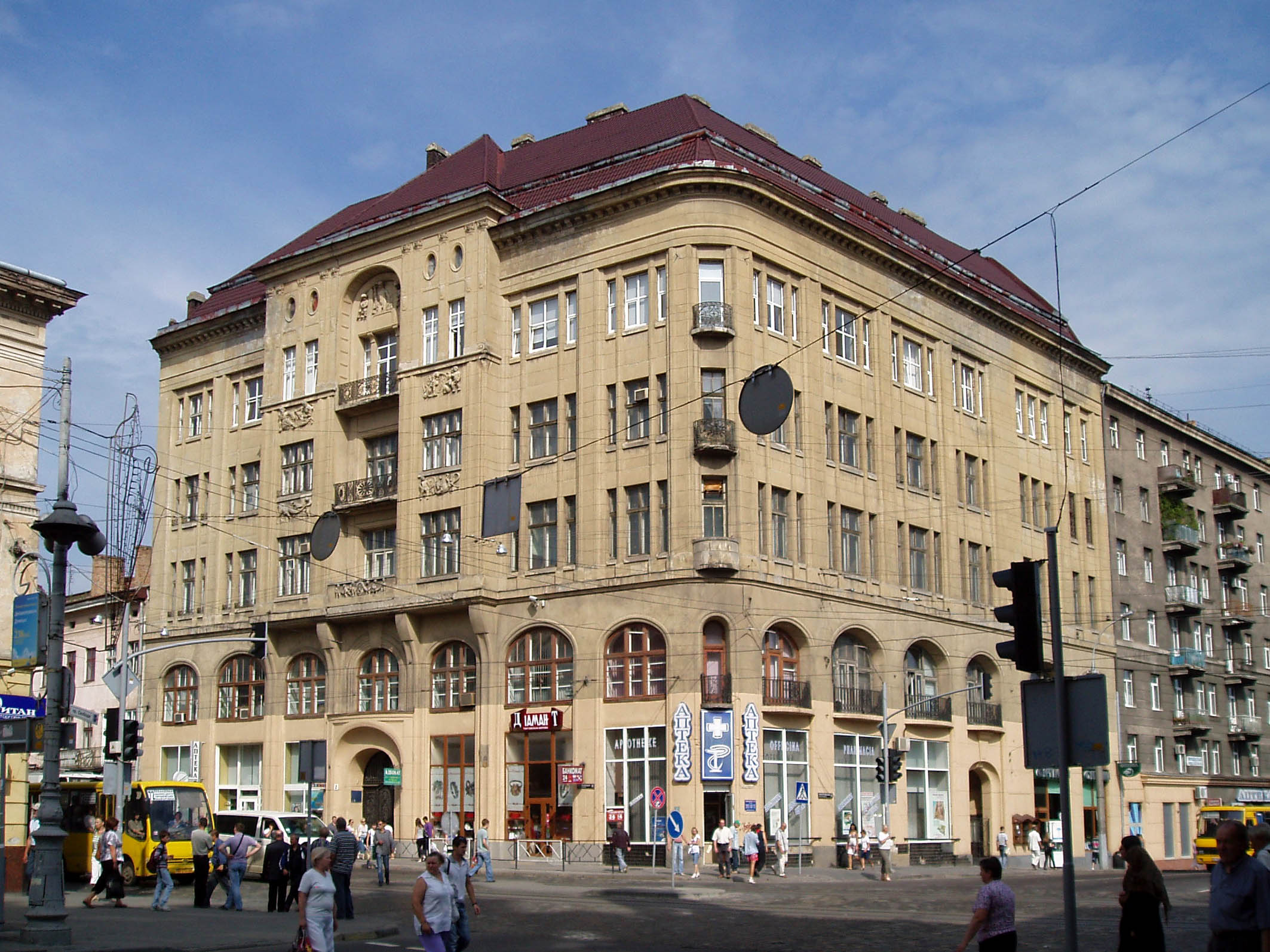
Horodotska St. 2

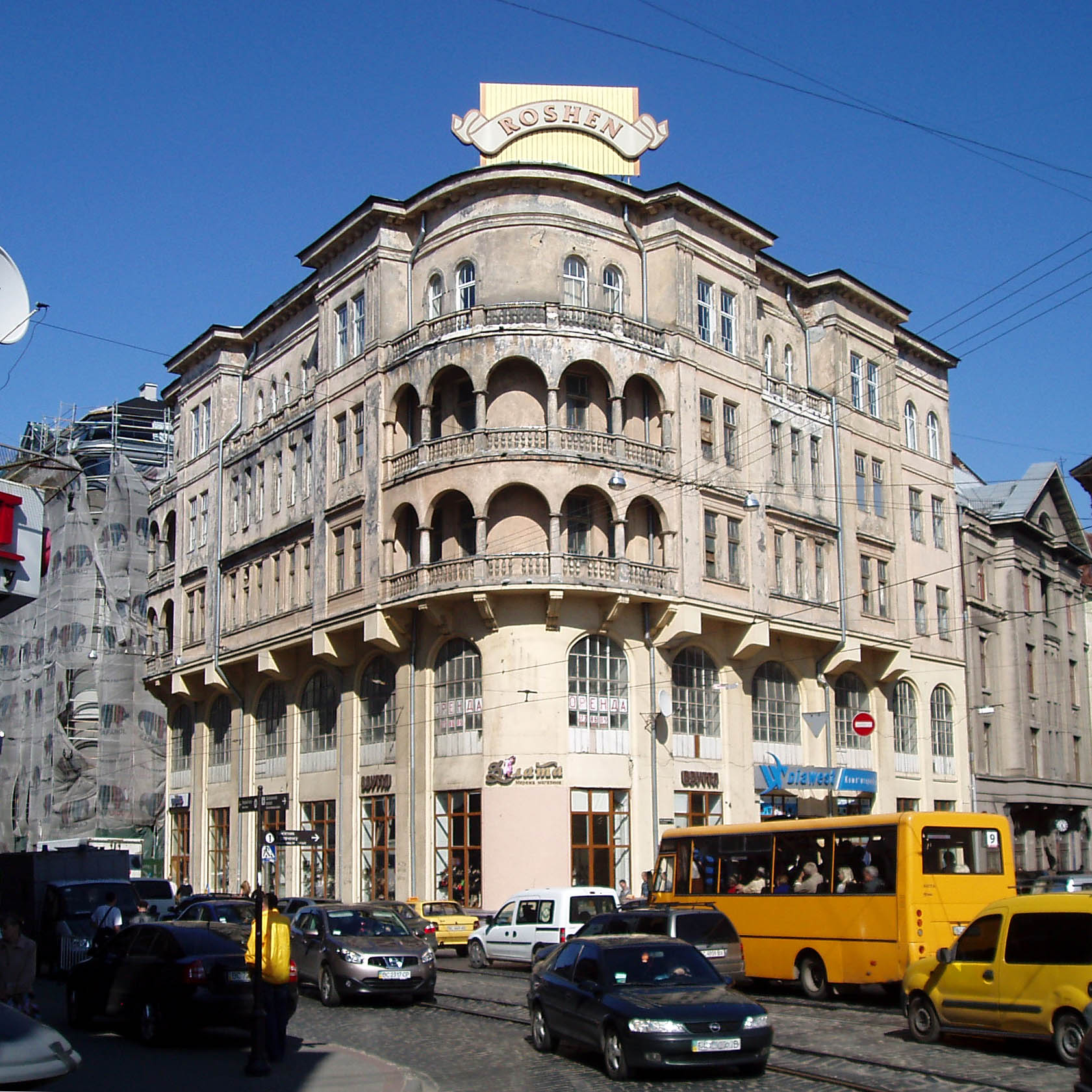
Horodotska St. 17

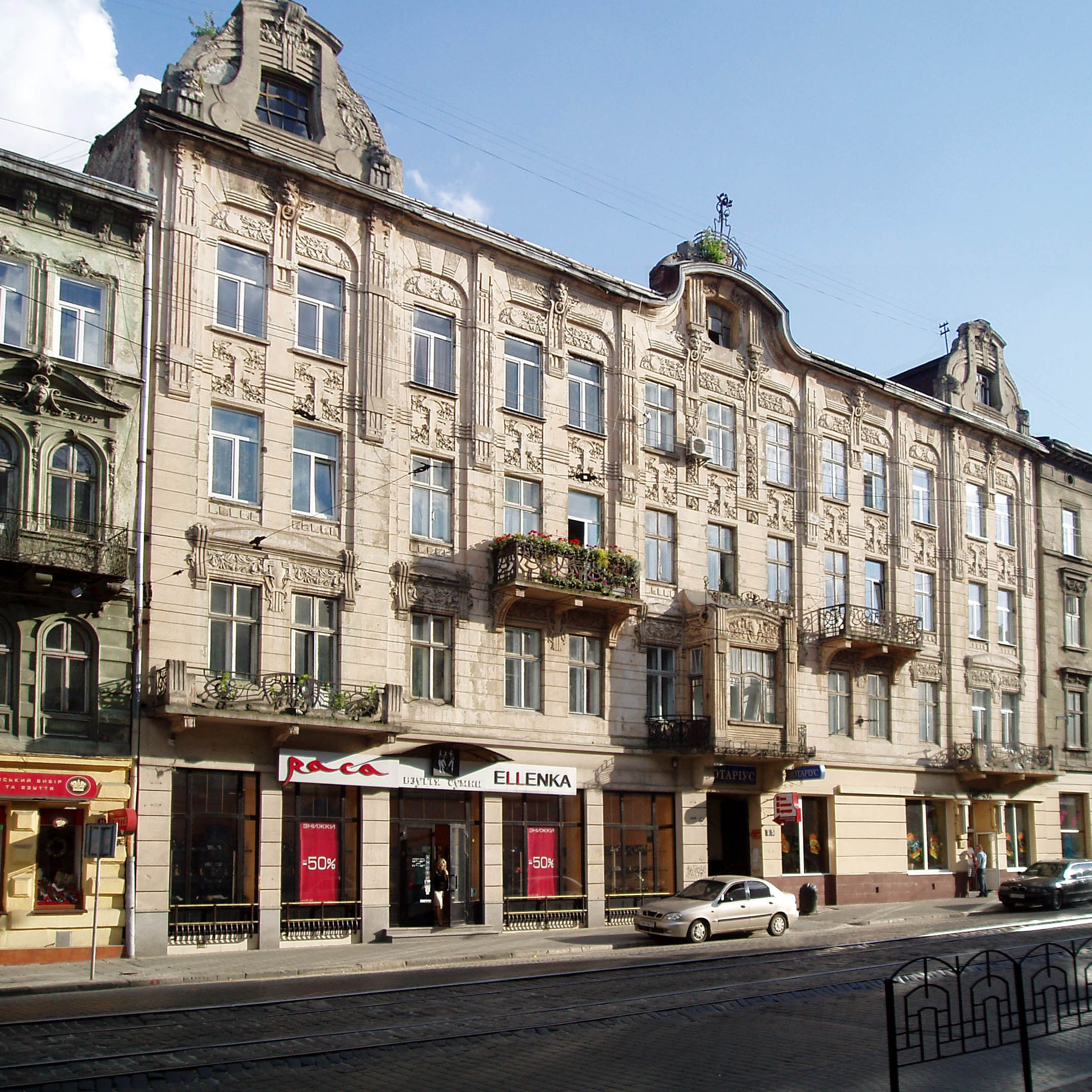
Horodotska St. 45

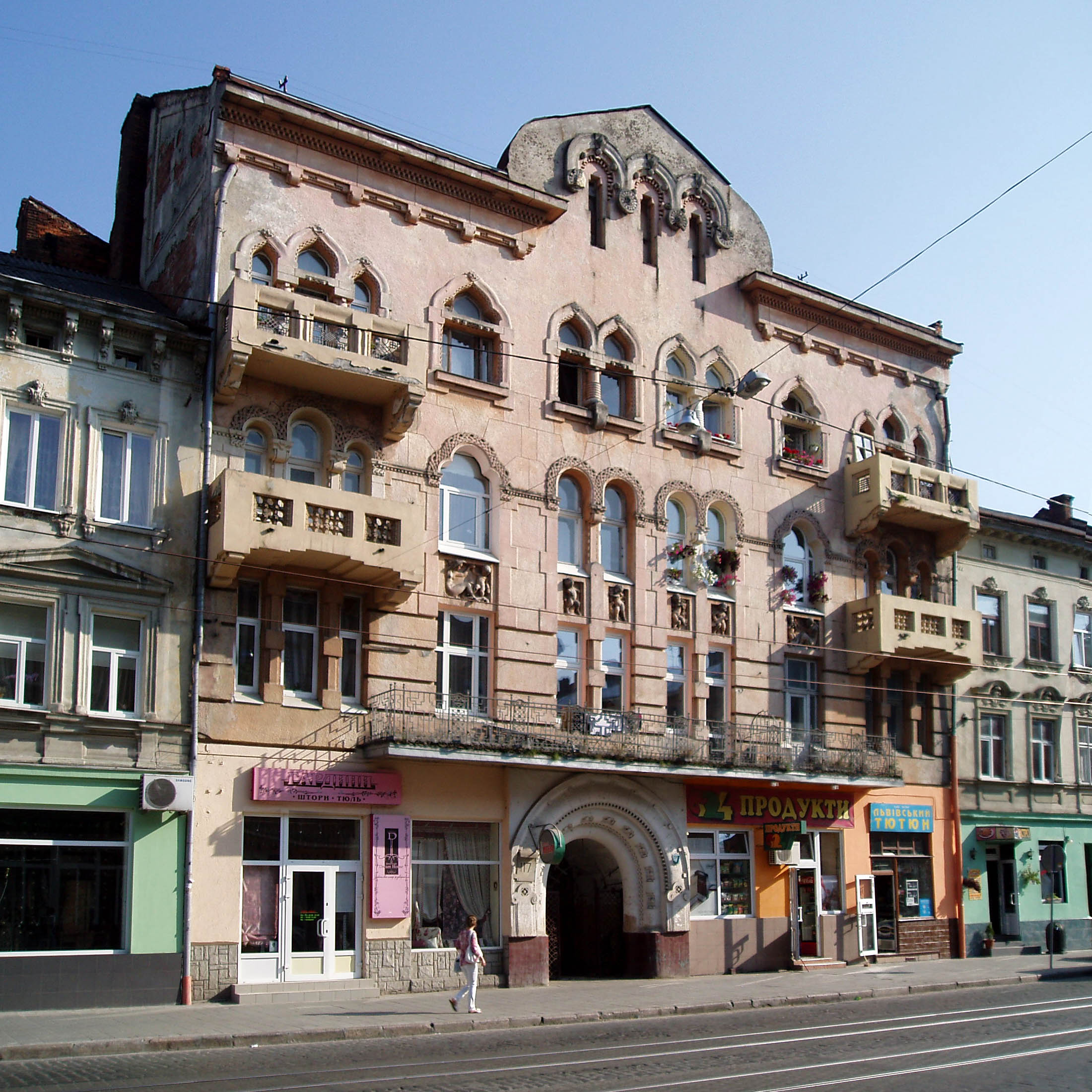
Horodotska St. 117

== Sources ==
- Архітектура Львова: Час і стилі. XIII—XXI ст / М. Бевз, Ю. Бірюльов, Ю. Богданова, В. Дідик, У. Іваночко, Т. Клименюк та інші. — Львів : Центр Європи, 2008. — 720 с. — ISBN 978-966-7022-77-8.
- Енциклопедія Львова (За редакцією А. Козицького та І. Підкови) — Львів : Літопис, 2007–2010. — Т. 1–3.
- Бірюльов Ю. Захаревичі: Творці столичного Львова. — Львів : Центр Європи, 2010. — С. 310. — ISBN 978-966-7022-86-0.
- Справочник. Львов, 1949, с. 105.
- Мельник І. В. Львівські вулиці і кам'яниці, мури, закамарки, передмістя та інші особливості Королівського столичного міста Галичини. — Львів : Центр Європи, 2008. — С. 355. — ISBN 978-966-7022-79-2.
- Революції безсмертя. Місцями революційної слави на Львівщині, 1977, с. 62.
