= Halytskyi Raion =

Halytskyi Raion may refer to:

- Halych Raion, a former district of Ukraine's Ivano-Frankivsk Oblast with its center in the city of Halych
- Halytskyi District, Lviv, a city district in Lviv named after Ruthenian king Daniel of Galicia (Danylo Halytskyi)
