= Church of Transfiguration, Lviv =

Church in Lviv, Ukraine

Coordinates: 49°50′37″N 24°1′46″E

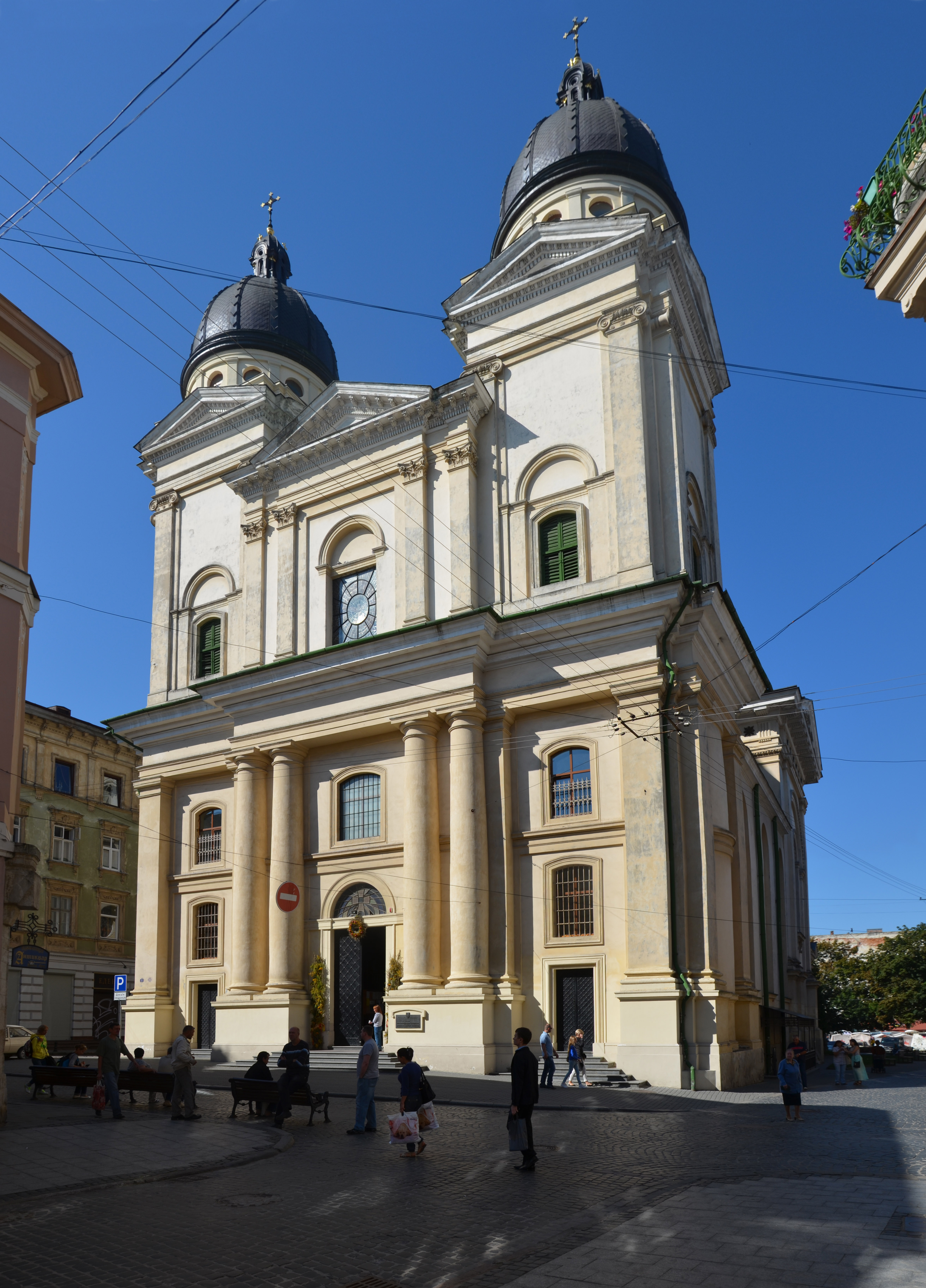
Church's façade seen from Krakivska St.

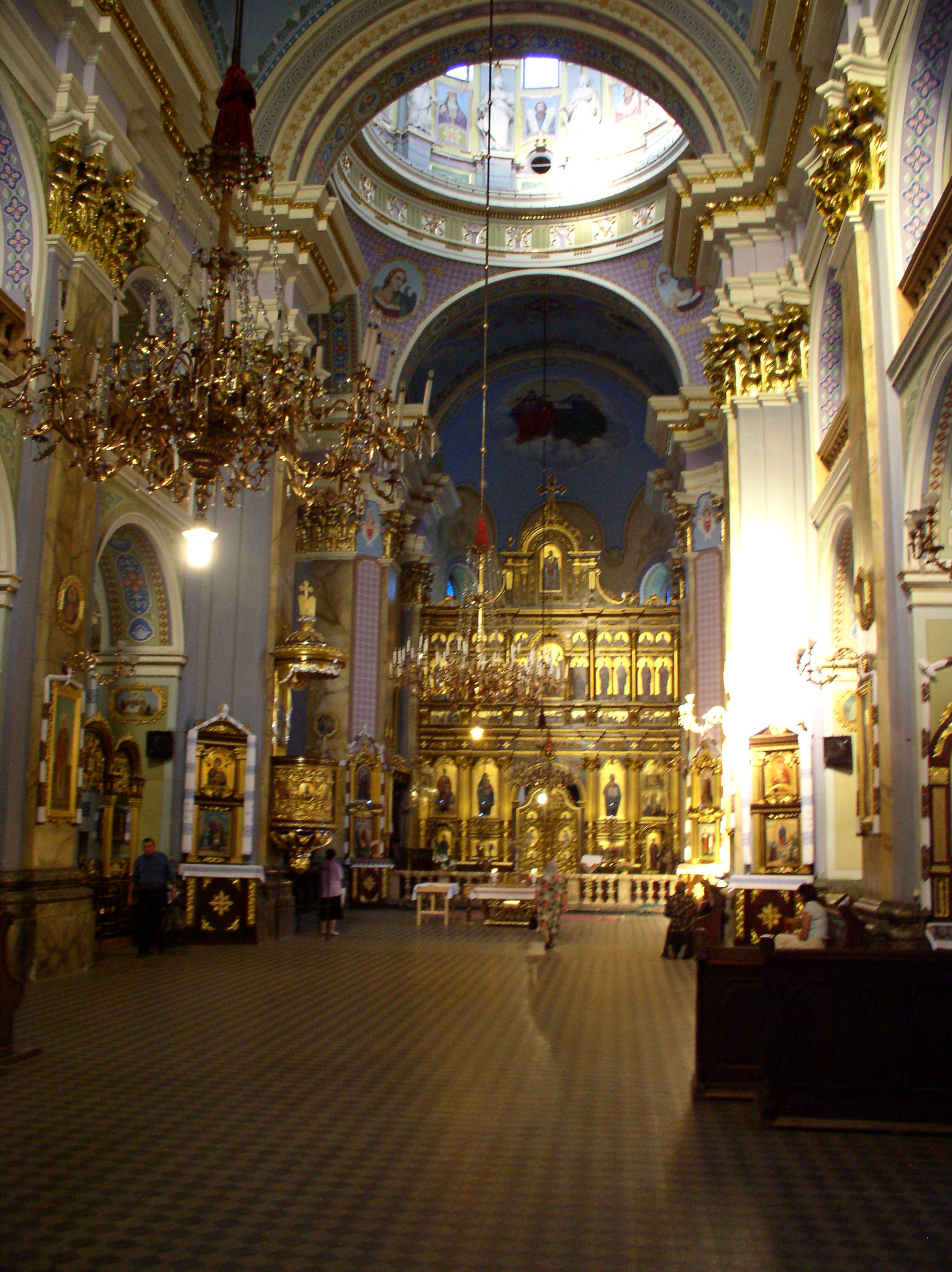
Interior

The Church of the Transfiguration (Ukrainian: Преображенська церква, Preobrazhenska tserkva, or more formally Церква Преображення Господа Нашого Ісуса Христа, Tserkva preobrazhennia Hospoda Nashoho Isusa Khrysta) in Lviv, Ukraine, is located in the city's Old Town, just north of the Market Square.

It was originally built as the Roman Catholic church of the Holy Trinity of the Trinitarian Order, between 1703 and 1731, in the style of French classicism but with a Baroque interior. In 1783, the monastery was abolished by the Holy Roman Emperor Joseph II and the church was used as a library of the Lviv University, until it was destroyed by Austrian artillery during the Spring of Nations in 1848.

The ruins of the church were rebuilt by the Greek Catholic Church, according to the project made by architect Sylvester Havryshkevich, and most of the original design was kept. However, an apse was added to the short presbytery and domes that now dominate the facade were built on the church's towers. The interior underwent much deeper changes to adapt it to the needs of Eastern Rite liturgy.

The church was reconsecrated on 29 April 1906, as the Greek Catholic church of the Transfiguration of Our Lord Jesus Christ, by the Ukrainian Metropolitan of Lviv Andrey Sheptytsky, Bishop of Peremyshl Constantine (Chekhovych) and Bishop of Stanyslaviv Blessed Hryhory Khomyshyn. In the first half of the 20th century, the parish became one of the main cultural centres of the Ukrainian national movement. On 29 October 1989 this was the first parish to be restored with the imminent collapse of the Soviet Union.

The church contains sculptures and paintings by Kornylo Ustiyanovych, Tadeusz Popiel, Teophil Kopystynski and Leonard Marconi. Tadeusz Popiel designed and made the iconostasis for the church in 1900–1901. Teophil Kopystynski is the author of the located behind the altar of the image of the Transfiguration. In 1896–1898, stained-glass windows of Ruthenian saints were made by a firm in Innsbruck, according to sketches by Anton Pylychowski.

== Bibliography ==
- Rudenko, Oleh (2007). "Przemiany wnętrz świątyń ukraińskich na przełomie XIX i XX wieku" [Transformations of Ukrainian temple interiors at the turn of the 20th century] (PDF). Series Byzantina (in Polish). 5: 143–167.
