= Lviv Suburban railway station =

Railway station in Lviv, Ukraine

Coordinates: 49°50′12″N 23°59′48″E

Lviv–Suburban Львів–Приміський
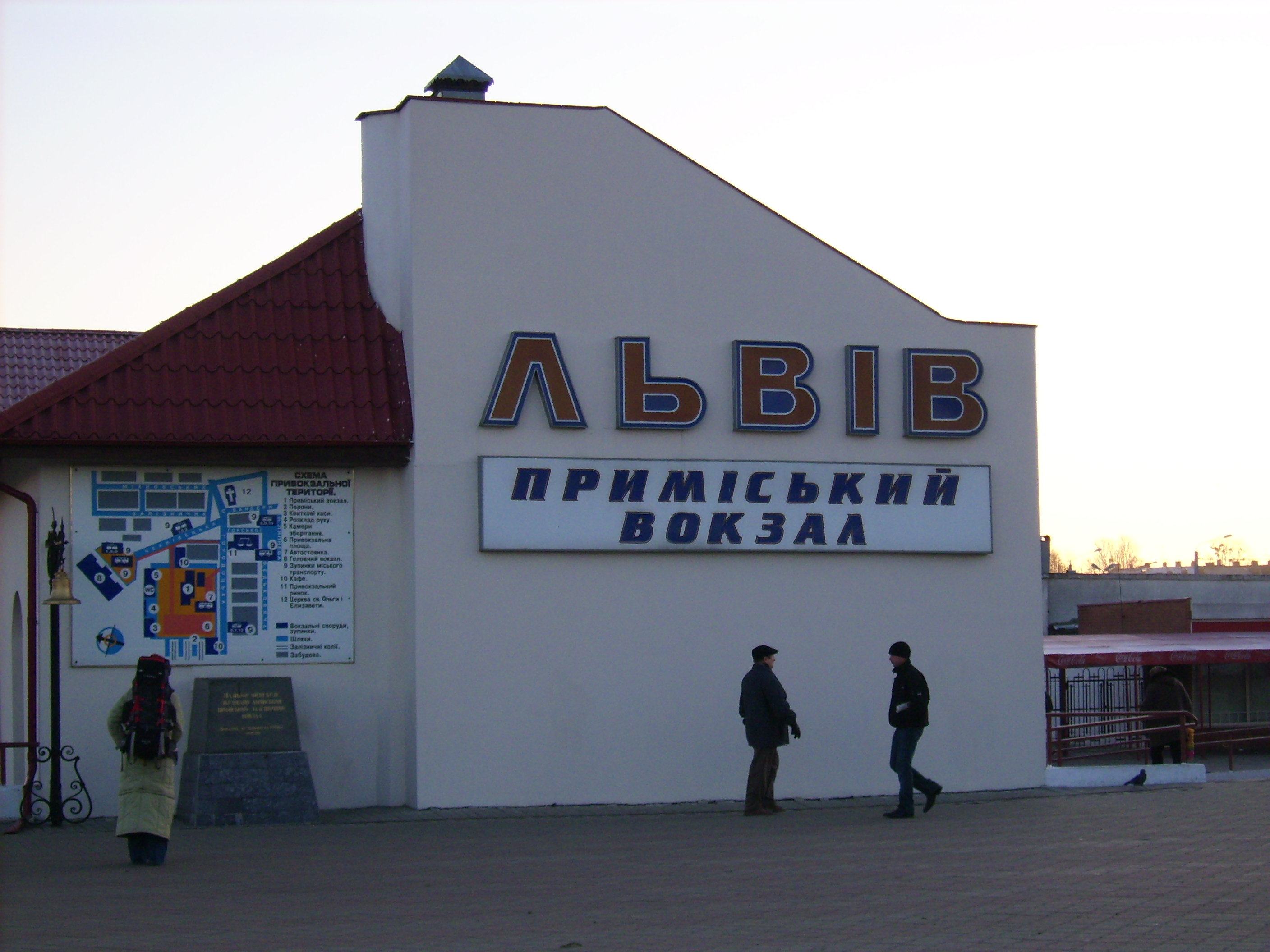
- Lviv Suburban Train Station in 2006

General information
- Location: Lviv; Ukraine

History
- Opened: 1996
Location

The Lviv Suburban Train Station (Ukrainian: Львівський приміський вокзал, Lvivs'kyi prymis'kyi vokzal) is a train station serving the suburban areas of Lviv, as well as the territory of Lviv Oblast. The Suburban Train Station was built in 1996.

== See also ==
- Lviv Rail Terminal
