= Halytskyi District, Lviv =

Coordinates: 49°50′16.49″N 24°01′43.35″E

Halytskyi District Галицький район
- Urban district in Lviv
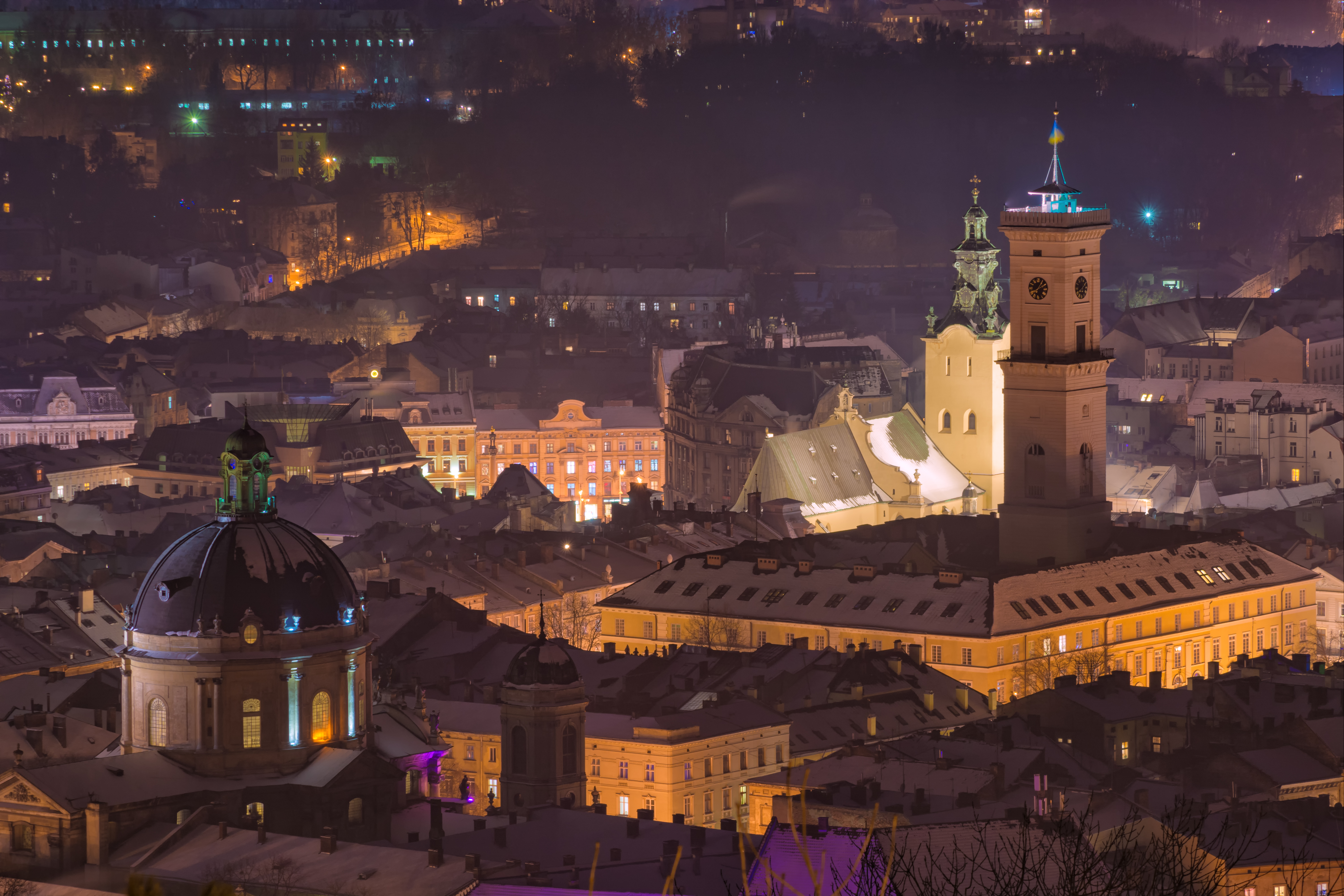
- View of the Lviv Town Hall at night

- Map of Lviv and its districts with Halytskyi highlighted in red
- Country: Ukraine
- Oblast: Lviv Oblast

Population (2024)
  - Total: 46,965
- Time zone: EET

Halytskyi District (Ukrainian: Галицький район) is an urban district of the city of Lviv, named after the founder of the city, Ruthenian king Daniel of Galicia (Danylo Halytskyi (Note: Ukrainian: Данило Галицький)). Halytskyi District covers territory of the Old City, with the center in Market Square, and some other central neighborhoods like Snopkiv, Sofiyivka and Citadel.

== Historical areas ==
=== Old Town ===
Lviv's Old Town emerged on its modern site in the 14th century, following the establishment of Polish rule over the city, to the southwest of the original city core of the princely times. The neighbourhood developed until the 18th century following a rectangular grid plan. It contains numerous multi-storey buildings, as well as churches and other monuments, and is dominated by the 76-meter Lviv Town Hall located in the middle of the Market Square. Other prominent structures in the area include the Black House, Korniakt Palace, Lubomirski Palace, Latin Cathedral, Armenian Cathedral, Assumption Church, Bernardine Church, Boim and Campian Chapels, Golden Rose Synagogue, Jesuit Church, Transfiguration Church etc. A Jewish ghetto was formerly located in the southern part of the neighbourhood, between the Market Square and Valova Street.

Under Austrian rule in the second half of the 19th century, the city core of Lviv moved west from the Old Town, with the new center emerging around the modern-day Shevchenko Avenue (Akademiczna Street), Mickiewicz Square and Freedom Avenue, along the now-enclosed riverbed of Poltva. Among the most prominent structures of this area are Hotel George, Lviv Opera, Central Post Office and the Shevchenko Scientific Society building. To the west, on a hill in the vicinity of Lviv Railway Station, St. George's Cathedral is located. Located nearby, on the western entrance to the historical part of Lviv, is the Church of Saints Olga and Elizabeth. Constructed as a Catholic church in the early 20th century in order overshadow the Greek Catholic Cathedral of St. George, it was recognized as Lviv's tallest building. During the period of Soviet rule it functioned as a warehouse, and during the 1990s was allocated to the Greek Catholic community.

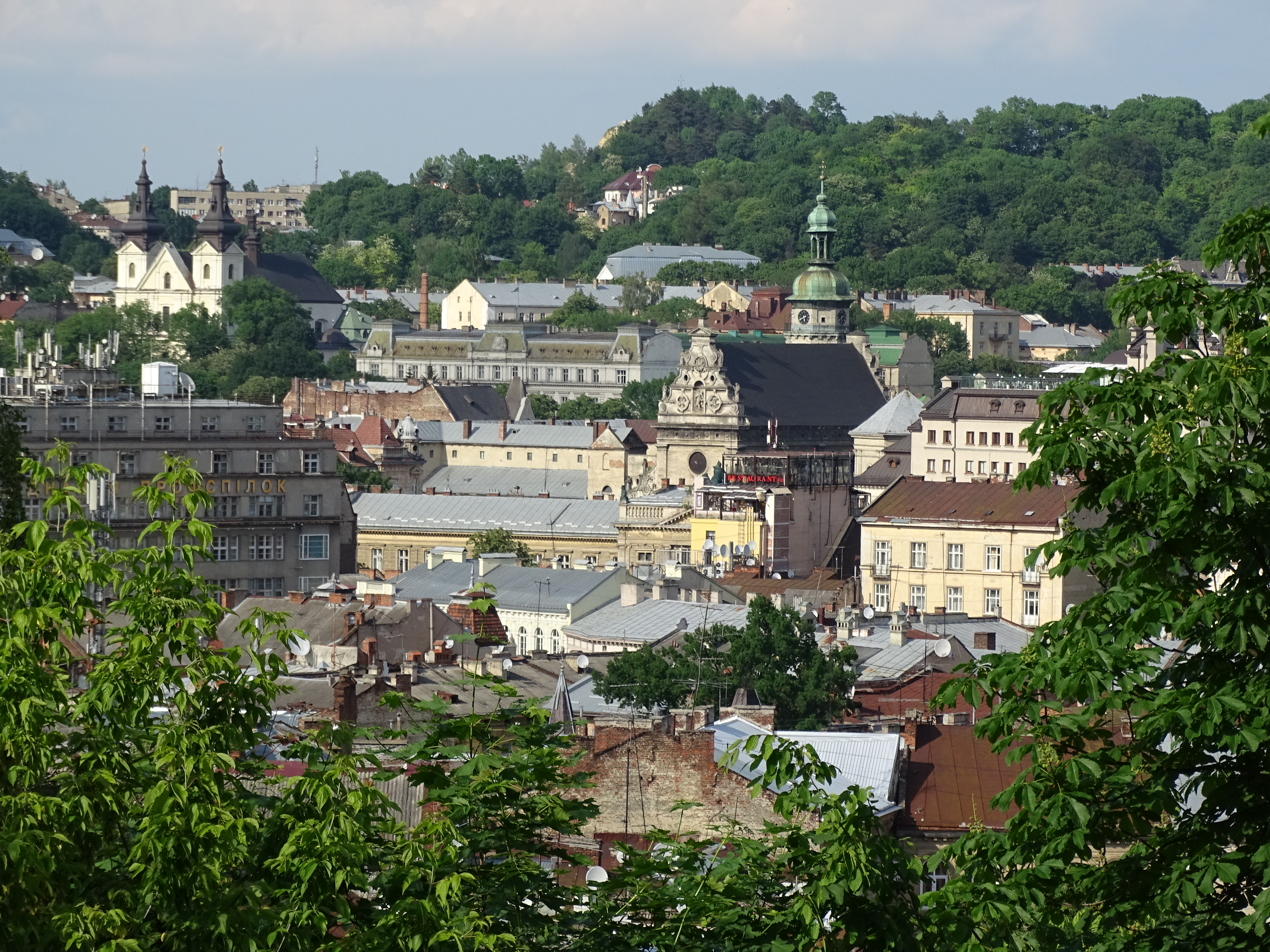
View of the Old Town

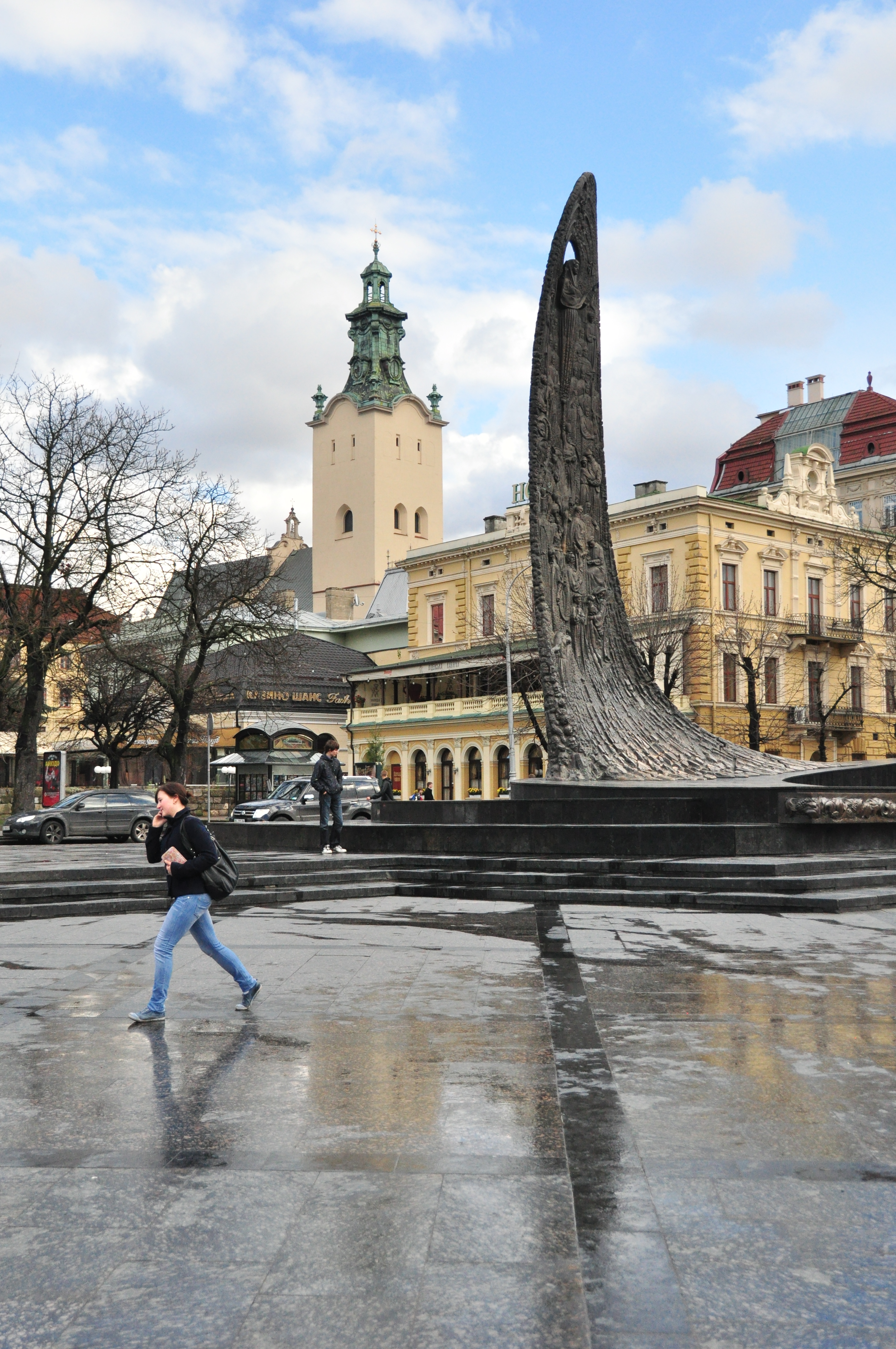
Taras Shevchenko monument on Freedom Avenue, with Latin Cathedral in the background

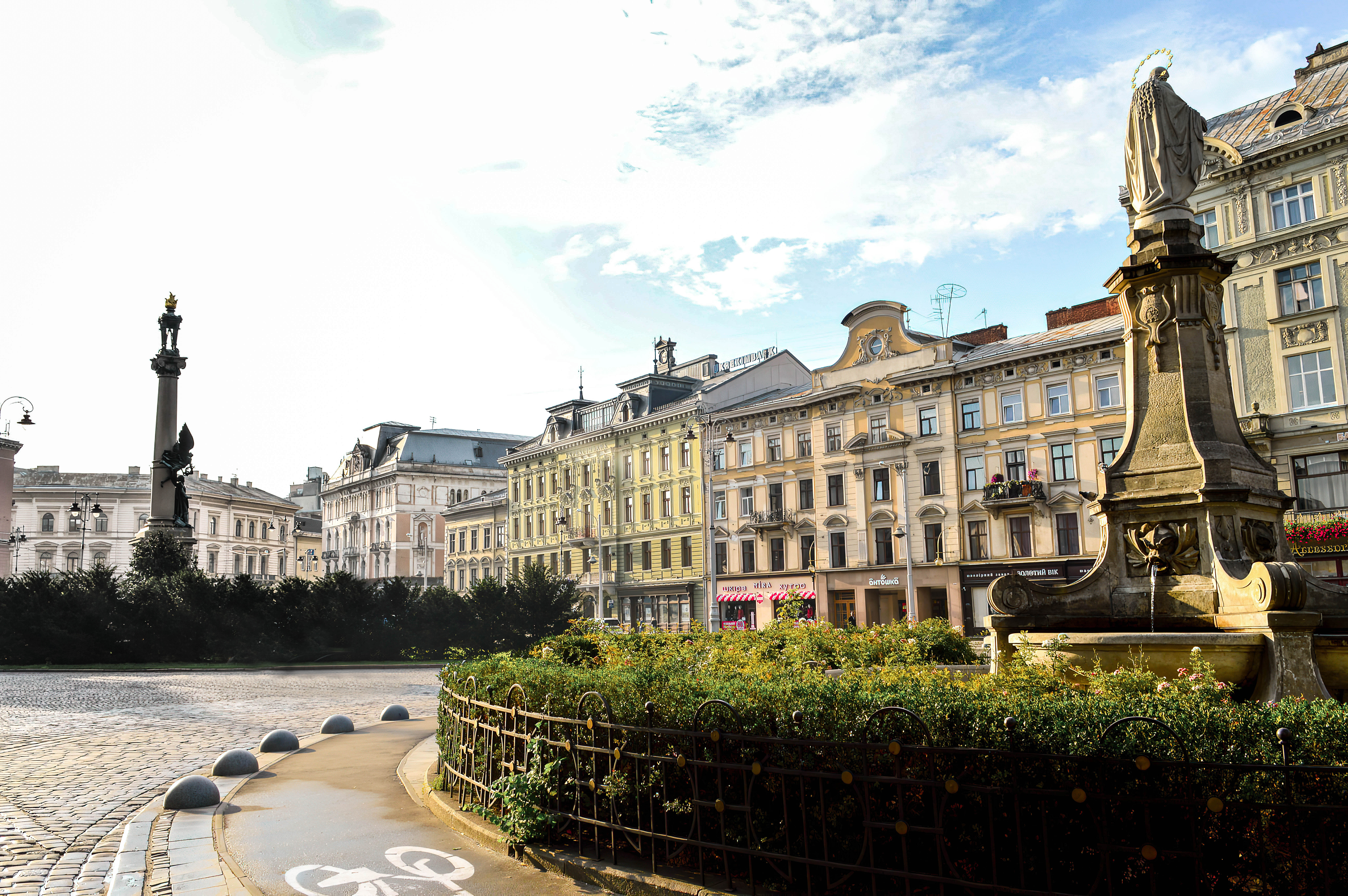
Mickiewicz Square with a monument to Adam Mickiewicz (left)

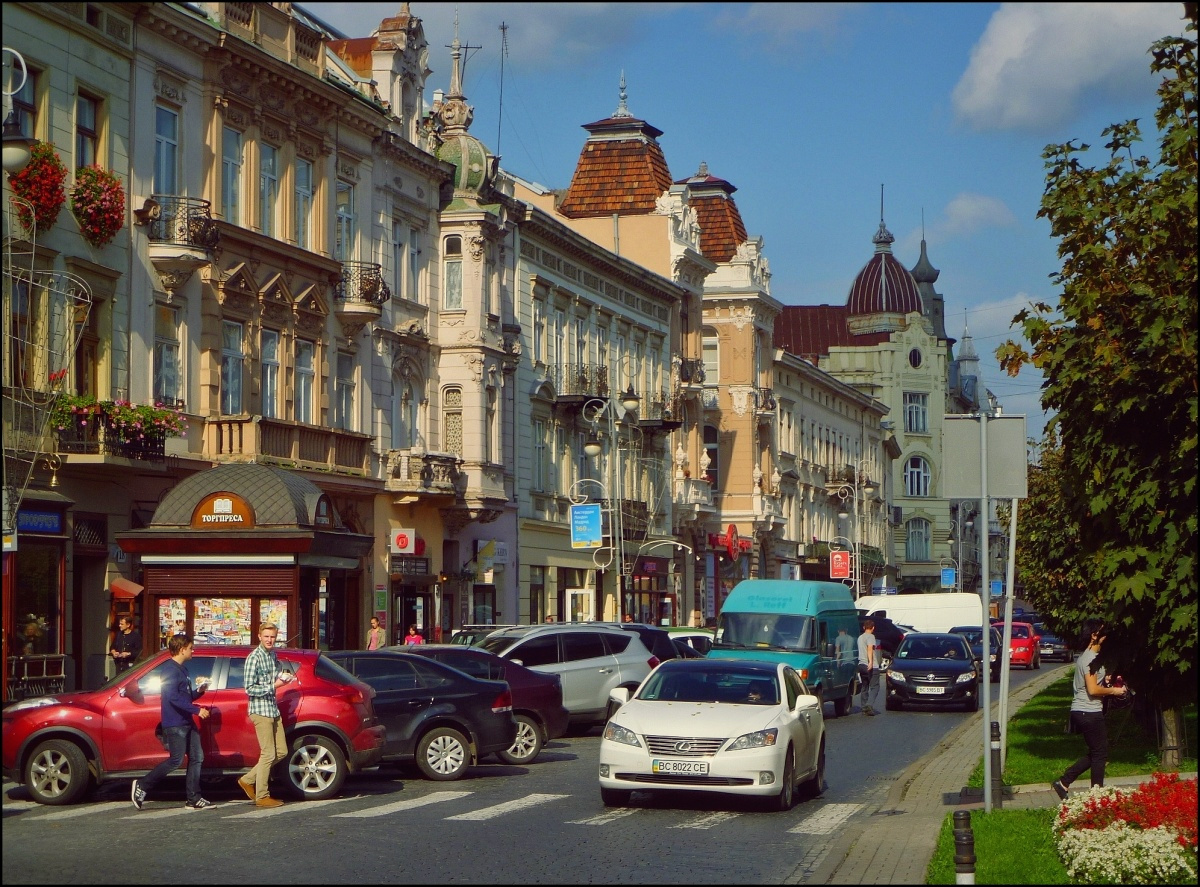
Architecture of Shevchenko Avenue

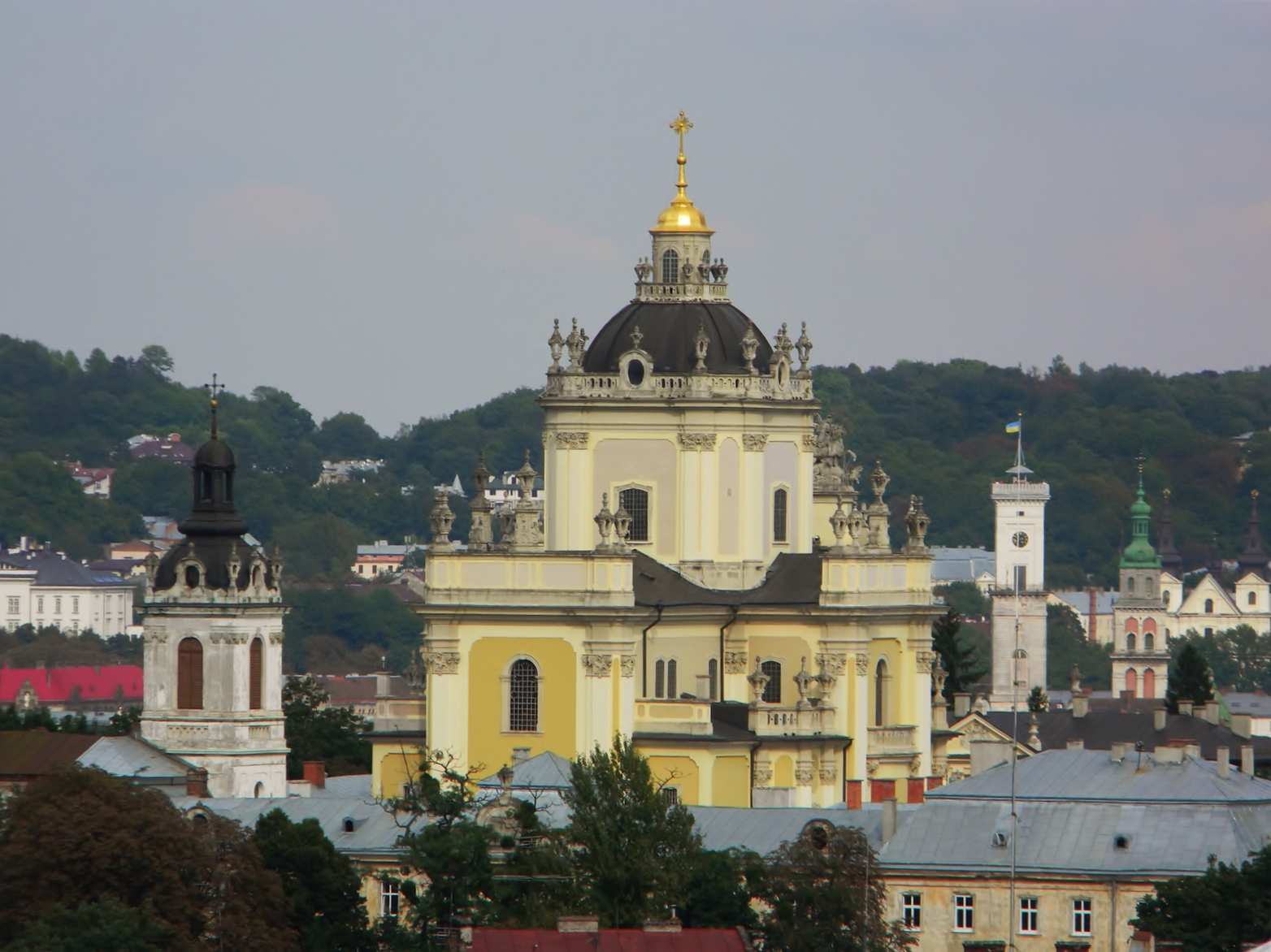
View of St. George's Cathedral, with Town Hall and Korniakt's Tower in the background

=== Citadel ===
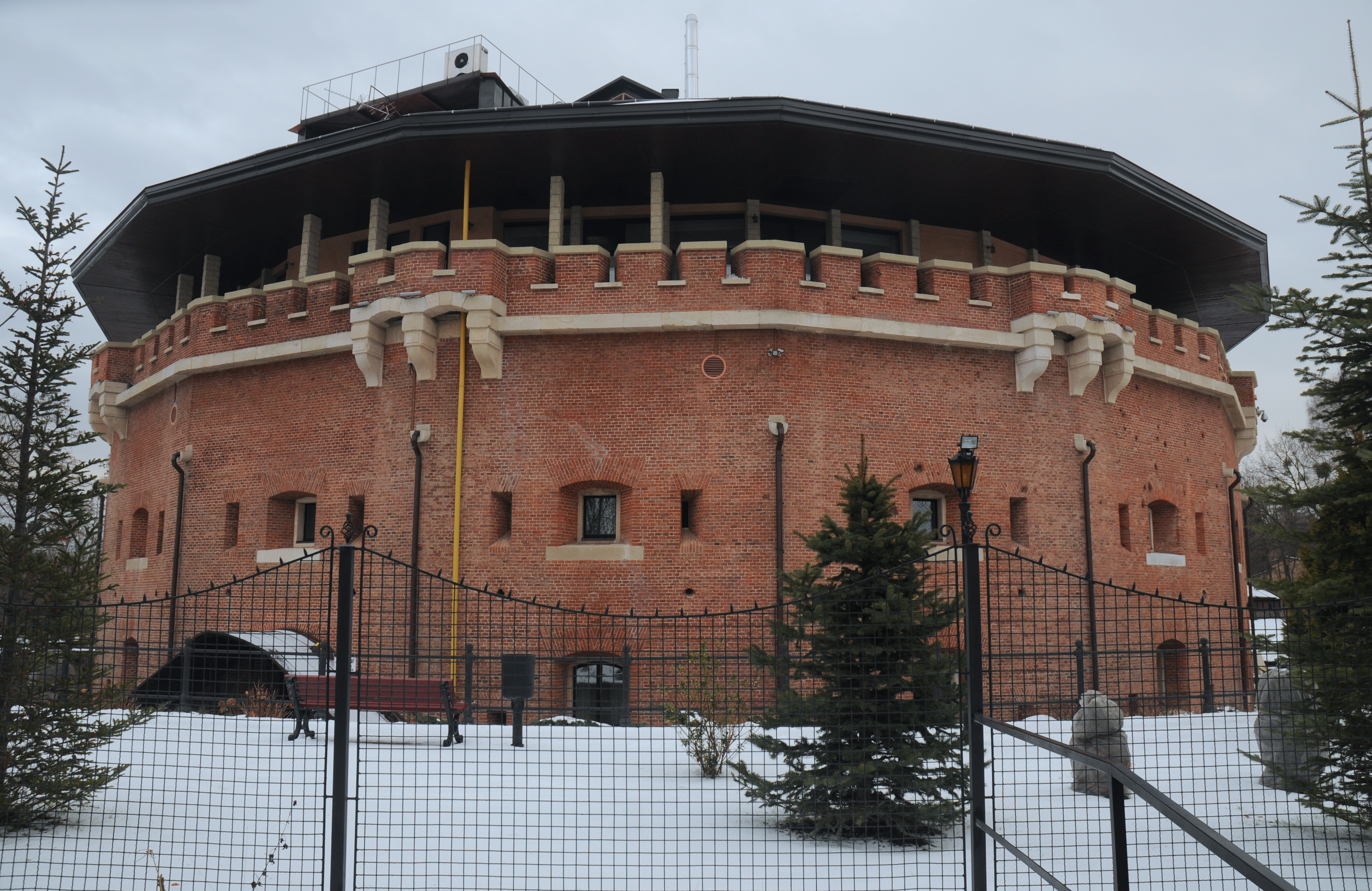
One of the towers of Lviv Citadel

After the demolition of Lviv's historical walls in the late 18th century, the city underwent a period of significant expansion. Civil unrest during the 1848 Spring of the Nations showed the weakness of Austrian control over the city, and moved the authorities to construct a new system of fortifications, which would replace the obsolete High and Low Castles and serve as a full-time base for an army garrison. The citadel was erected on the territory of three hills to the south of the city. The eastern tower of the citadel was built in 1852-1854 at the site previously known as Kalicha Hora ("Cripples' Hill"), where a hospital had functioned until 1619. In 1656 Lviv historian and poet Bartolomej Zimorowic built his residence on the location.

Lviv Citadel consists of four main towers located around a V-shaped building housing the barracks, protected by a redoubt. All towers were surrounded with stone-clad trenches and equipped with cannons trasported by a system of elevators. The complex can be accessed by two roads, one leading to the city, and another connected with a secret underground entrance to the south. The brick structures of the citadel were built at the personal expense of Emperor Franz Joseph, who also initiated the construction of the similarly-styled House of Invalids at the Kortumivka hill in Lviv.

In course of the First World War the citadel was occupied by Russian troops for 9 months. During that time a pond located nearby was dried up by soldiers looking for a hidden treasure. After the outbreak of the Polish-Ukrainian War the citadel served as an outpost of Ukrainian troops and underwent a siege, during which one of its towers was damaged by artillery. During the Second World War a prison camp (Stalag) was established in the citadel complex by German authorities. 284,000 prisoners passed through the camp, with only around half of them surviving the ordeal due to poor living conditions, typhus and executions by Germans.

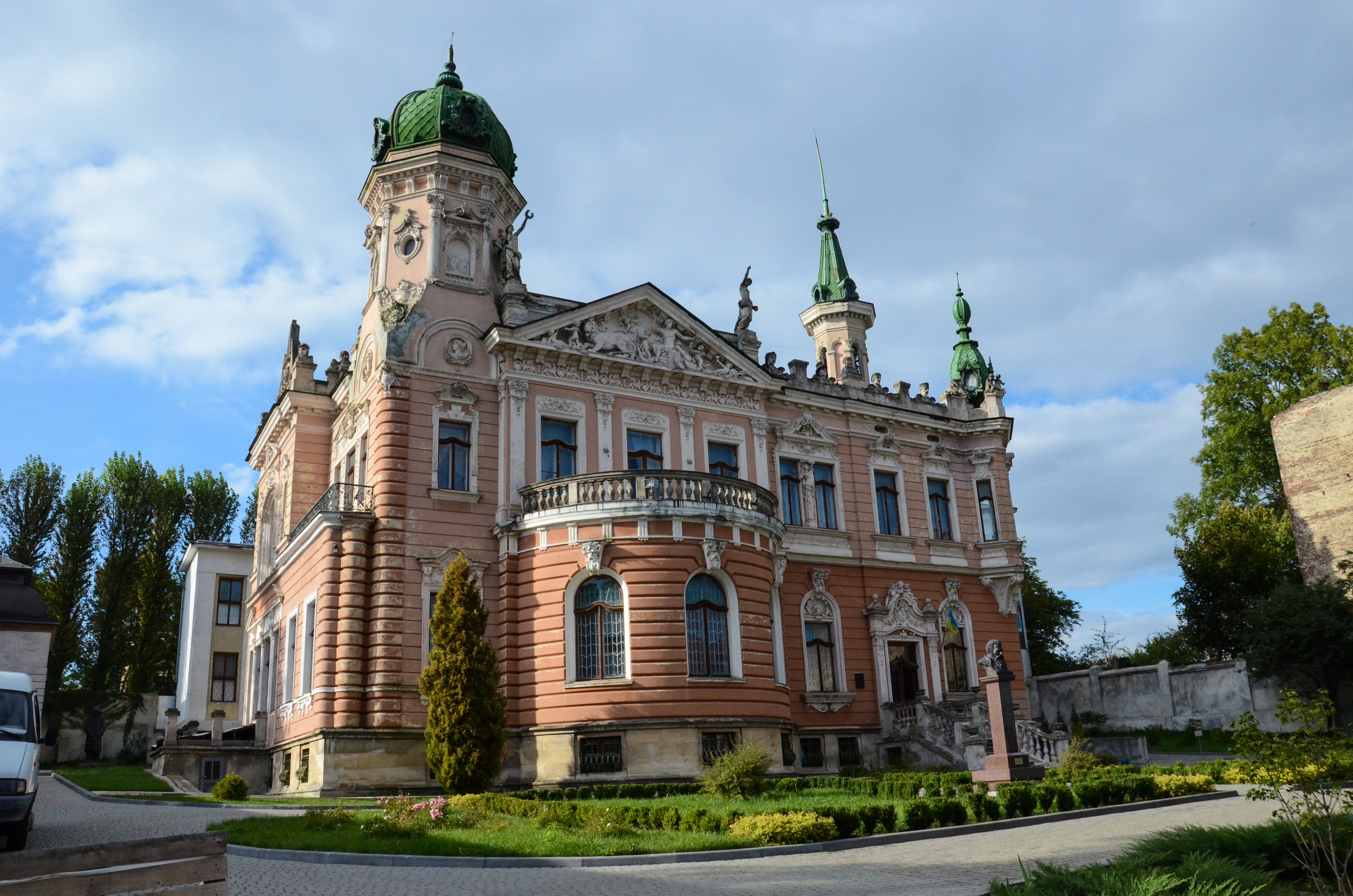
Historical Dunikowski Villa, now housing the National Museum

In Soviet times the citadel initially continued to serve as a military object, but later was divided between a number of institutions, including a library. During the 1990s a fire damaged one of the fortified towers. In our days parts of the citadel have been abandoned, but some structures of the historical complex have been repurposed as hotels and office spaces. A memorial stone in memory of prisoners headed in the citadel under German occupation has been installed in a nearby park.

Following the erection of the citadel, residential construction in the area was forbidden, and could only be resumed in the late 1880s. In 1904-1905 the library of Lviv University was established in the vicinity, decorated with sculptures by Antoni Popiel. Since 1913 the National Museum has been functioning in a nearby eclectic villa purchased by Andrey Sheptytsky. A monument to the metropolitan was installed in front of the museum building in 1935, but was destroyed by Soviet authorities 12 years later. Another monument dedicated to beekeeper Petro Prokopovych still stands on the museum's ground.

=== Sofiyivka ===
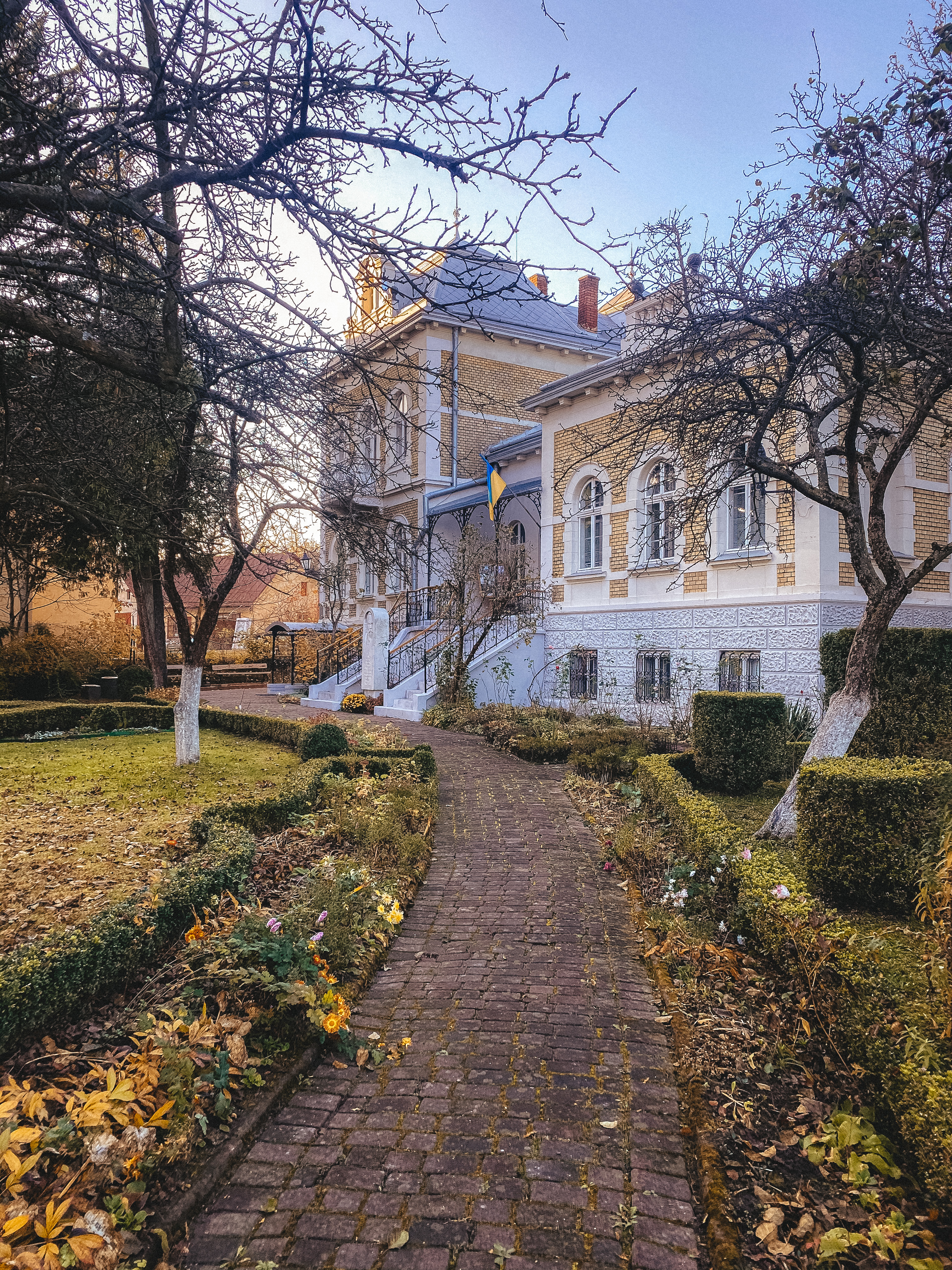
Hrushevskyi's Villa

In 1902 Ukrainian writer Ivan Franko and his wife Olha (née Khoruzhynska) moved to a villa not far from Stryi Park in an area called Sofiyivka, after the nearby Church of Saint Sophia. Modelled after the house of Olha's teacher, Kyiv historian Volodymyr Antonovych, the villa had a garden plot, and Franko's family was known to hold numerous household animals there. In 1940 a memorial museum dedicated to the writer was established in the building, with Franko's youngest son Petro becoming its first director. The museum's exposition includes numerous photographs and personal belongings of the Franko family.

The villa of Ukrainian historian Mykhailo Hrushevskyi was built in 1901-1902 in the area of Sofiyivka. After Hrushevskyi's move to Kyiv, where he headed the Central Rada of Ukrainian People's Republic, the building served as a residence of several other prominent figures, including Ukrainian composer Filaret Kolessa, German governor of Lviv Hans Kujath and Ivan Franko's son Taras. In 1998 a museum dedicated to Hrushevskyi was opened on premises of the villa.

== See also ==
- Urban districts of Ukraine
