= Old Town (Lviv) =

Old City of Lviv
- Старе місто Львова
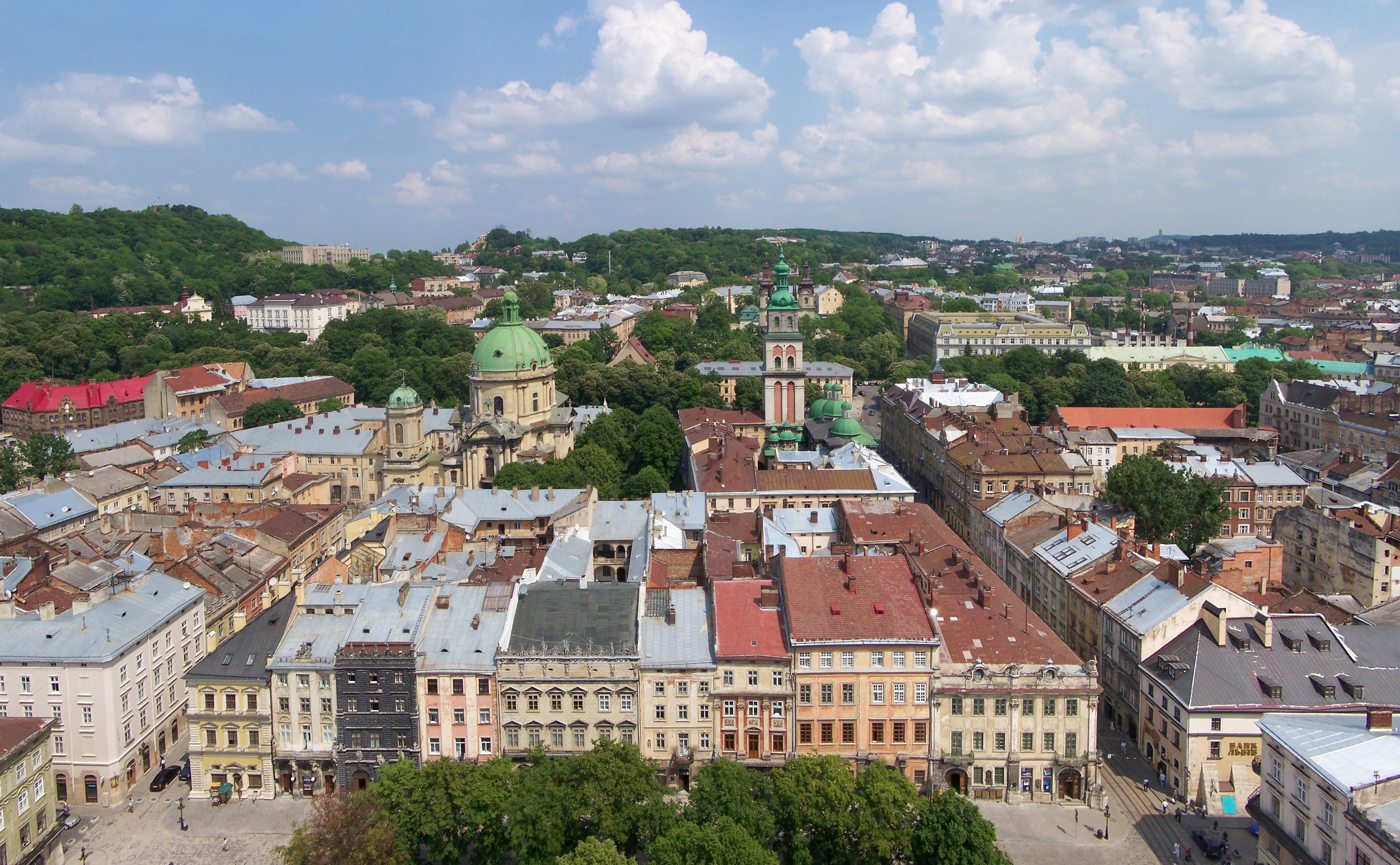
- View from the Town Hall, with Market Square in the foreground, Dominican Church in the background on the left and ensemble of the Dormition Church on the right.

General information
- Type: National Historic-Architectural Reserve
- Location: Lviv Oblast, Halytskyi District, Lviv, Ukraine
- Coordinates: 49°50′30″N 24°01′55″E
- Opened: National Reserve

UNESCO World Heritage Site
- Official name: L'viv – the Ensemble of the Historic Centre
- Criteria: ii, v
- Reference: 865
- Inscription: 1998 (22nd Session)
- Endangered: 2023

Lviv's Old Town (Ukrainian: Старе Місто Львова, romanized: Stare Misto L'vova; Polish: Stare Miasto we Lwowie) is the historic centre of the city of Lviv, within the Lviv Oblast (province) in Ukraine, recognized as a State Historic-Architectural Reserve in 1975.

== UNESCO ==
Since 1998, the United Nations Educational, Scientific and Cultural Organization (UNESCO) has listed Lviv's 300 acre historic center as part of "World Heritage". On 5 December 1998, during the 22nd Session of the World Heritage Committee in Kyoto (Japan), Lviv was added to the UNESCO World Heritage List. UNESCO gave the following statement explaining its selection:

Criterion ii: In its urban fabric and its architecture, Lviv is an outstanding example of the fusion of the architectural and artistic traditions of eastern Europe with those of Italy and Germany.

Criterion v: The political and commercial role of Lviv attracted to it a number of ethnic groups with different cultural and religious traditions, who established separate yet interdependent communities within the city, evidence for which is still discernible in the modern townscape.

The territory of the Lviv Historic Centre Ensemble covers 120 hectares (300 acres) of the Rus' and Medieval part of the city, as well as the territory of the St. George's Cathedral on St. George's Hill. The buffer area of the Historic Centre, which is defined by the historic area bounds, is approximately 3,000 hectares (7,400 acres).

== List of featured landmarks ==
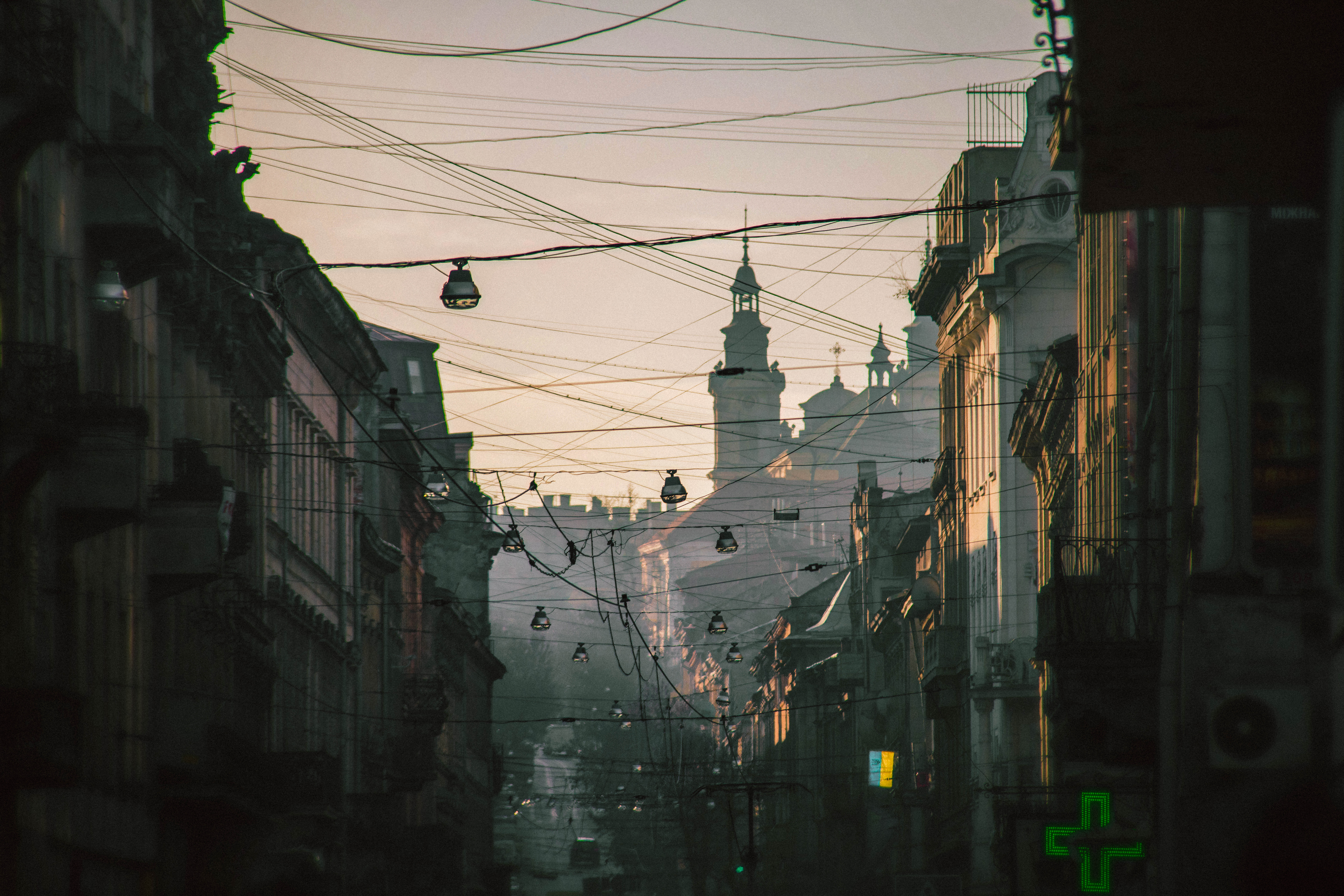
Streets

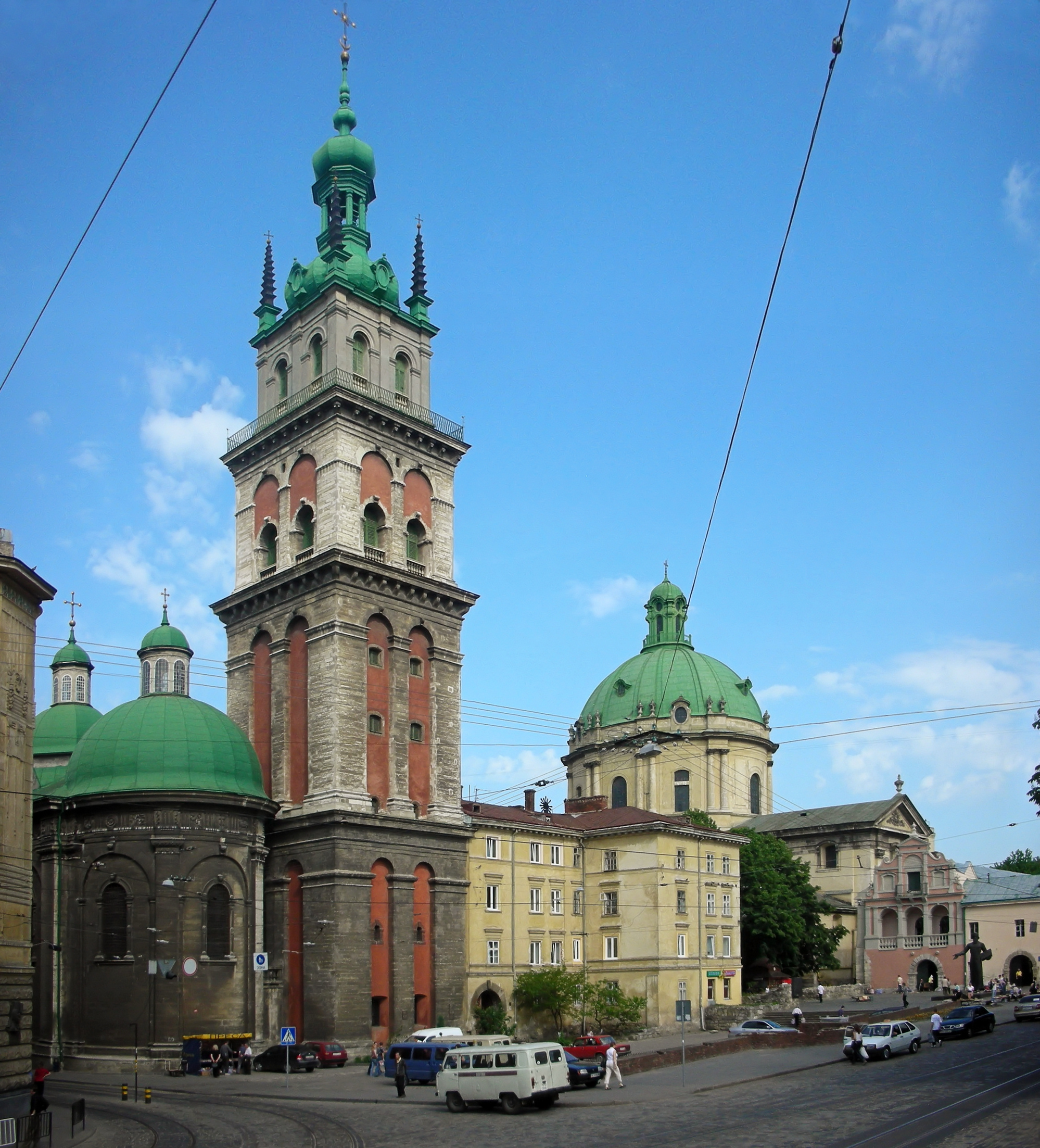
The complex of the Dormition Church is dominated by the 400-year-old Korniakt Tower.

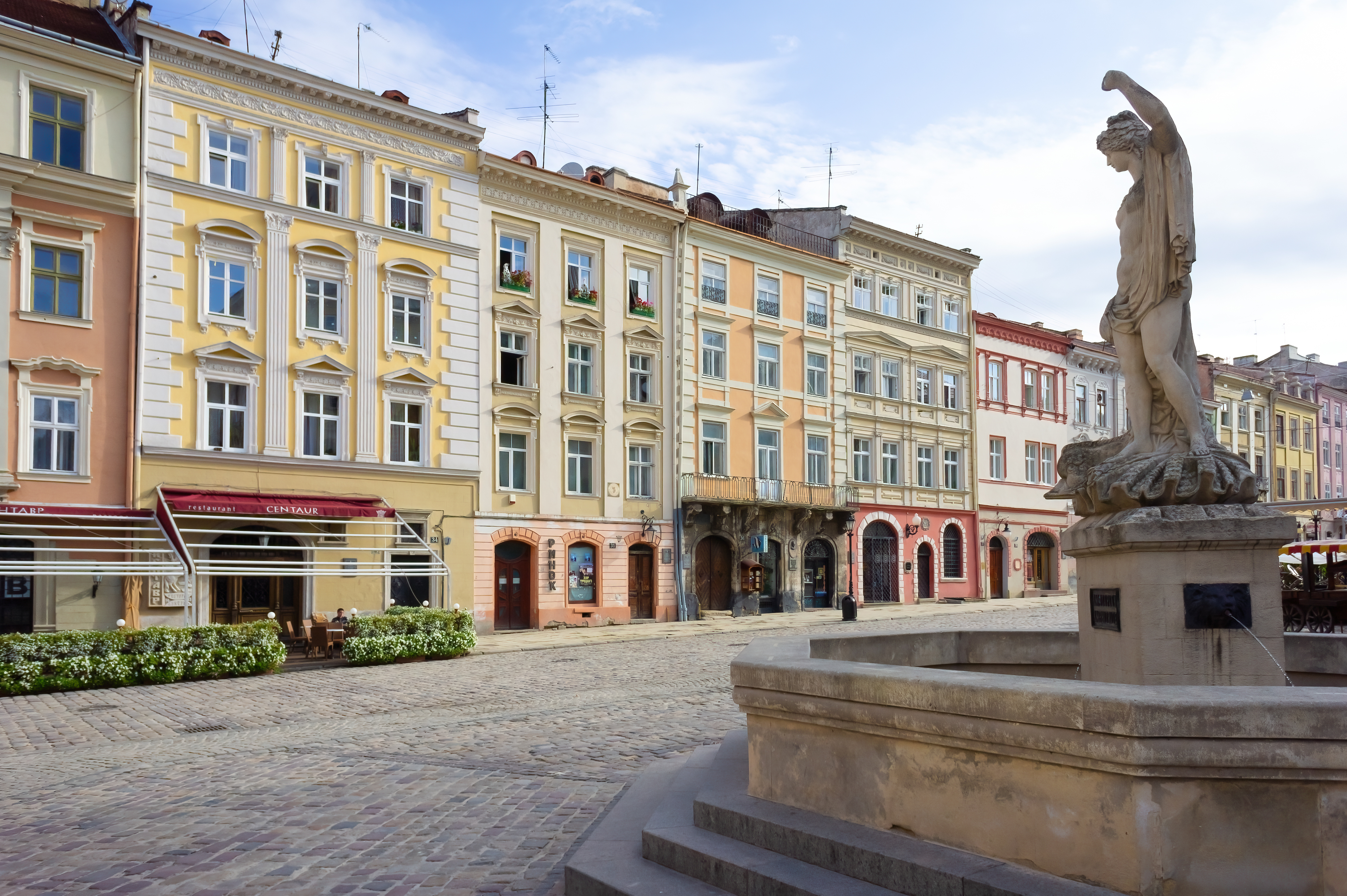
Market Square

Beside the listed items of three major areas, there are some 2,007 other historical landmarks within the Old City's area, 214 of which are considered national landmarks.

Pidzamche (Sub-castle)

- High Castle and Pidzamche neighborhood, the original center of the city including the Old Market Square
- Church of St. Nicholas, the family church of the Halychyna (Ruthenian) kings
- Church of St. Paraskeva-Praxedia (Good Friday), contains 1740 inconostasis of the church by Fedor Senkovych
- Church of St. Onuphrius and Basilian Monastery, contains artworks of Lazar Paslavsky and Modest Sosenko
- Church of St. John the Baptist (today – Museum of Lviv Ancient relics), the church was dedicated to the Hungarian wife of King Leo, Constance, a daughter of King Béla IV
- Church of Snowy Mary (today – Our Lady of Perpetual Help Church), the church of German colonists of the city

Seredmistia (Middletown)

- Ensemble of Rynok (Market) Square, contains Lviv Rathaus (center) and square perimeter of housing surrounding it
- Ensemble of the Church of Dormition, beside the church, includes Chapel of Three Prelates and Korniakt's Tower
- Ensemble of Armenian Church, beside the church, includes a belfry, a column with statue of St.Christopher, a building of former Armenian bank, a palace of the Armenian archbishops, Benedictine Armenian convent
- Ensemble of Latin Metropolitan Cathedral, beside the cathedral of St. Mary includes Boim Chapel and Kampians' Chapel
- Ensemble of Bernardine Monastery (now Church of St. Andrew), includes cathedral, monastery, belfry, rotunda, decorative colon, and defensive walls
- Ensemble of the Jesuit Cathedral and Collegium
- Ensemble of Dominican Church (now the Church of the Holy Eucharist), beside the church includes monastery and belfry
- Lviv Theatre of Opera and Ballet
- City's fortifications include the City's Arsenal, the Gunpowder Tower, the Turners and Ropemakers' Tower, the Royal Arsenal, a bastion of lower defense wall
- House of the "Dnister" Insurance Company

Church of St. Yura (St. George) the Dragonfighter

- St. George's Cathedral, beside the cathedral includes the Metropolitan's Palace, capitular houses, belfry, and fence with two gates (Market's and City's)

Old Town landmarks that are not part of the World Heritage Site

- Church of Carmelites, the Barefooted (today – Church of St. Michael)
- Church and Nunnery of Carmelites, the Barefooted (today – Church of Purification)
- Church of Poor Clares (today – Museum of Sacral Baroque Sculpture)
- Church of St. Martin (today – Baptist Church)
- Church of Transfiguration
- Church of St. Casimir
- Church of Sts. Olha and Elizabeth
- Potocki Palace, currently Borys Voznytsky Lviv National Art Gallery
- Commodity Stock Exchange

== Gallery ==
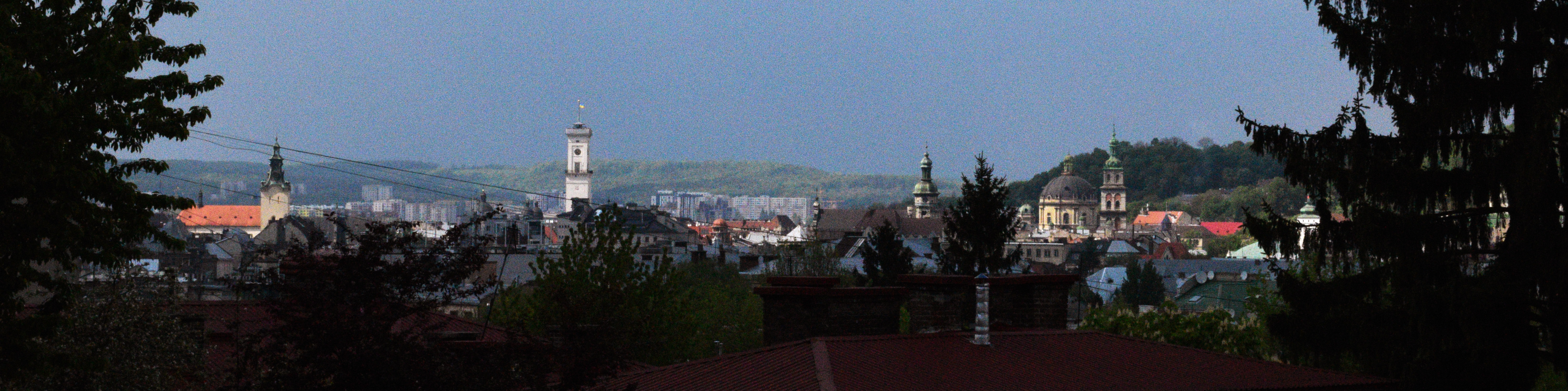
Panoramic view of the Old Town with the towers of the Latin Cathedral, Town Hall, Bernardine, Dominican and Dormition (Assumption) churches (left to right)

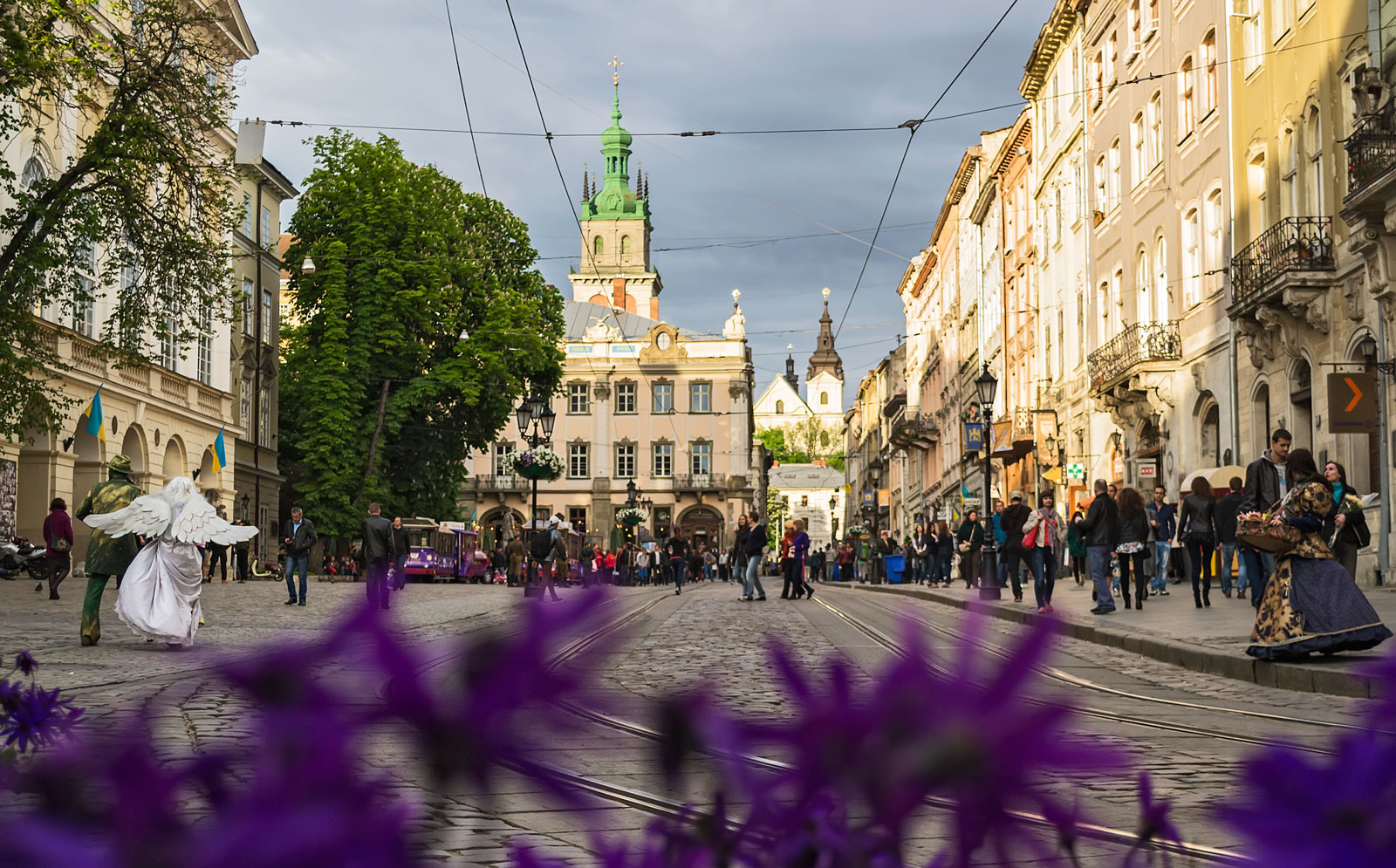
Market Square

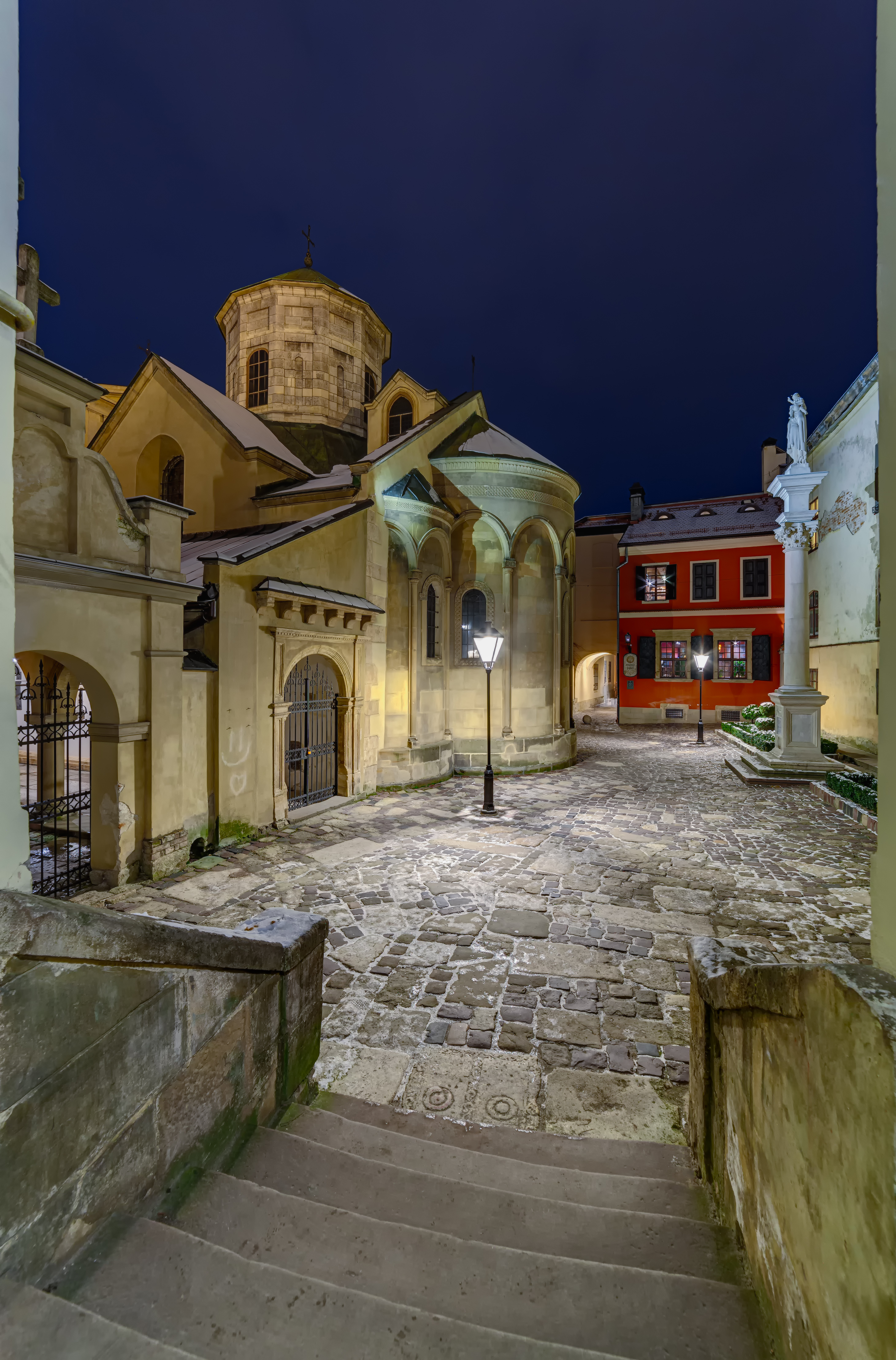
Armenian Cathedral

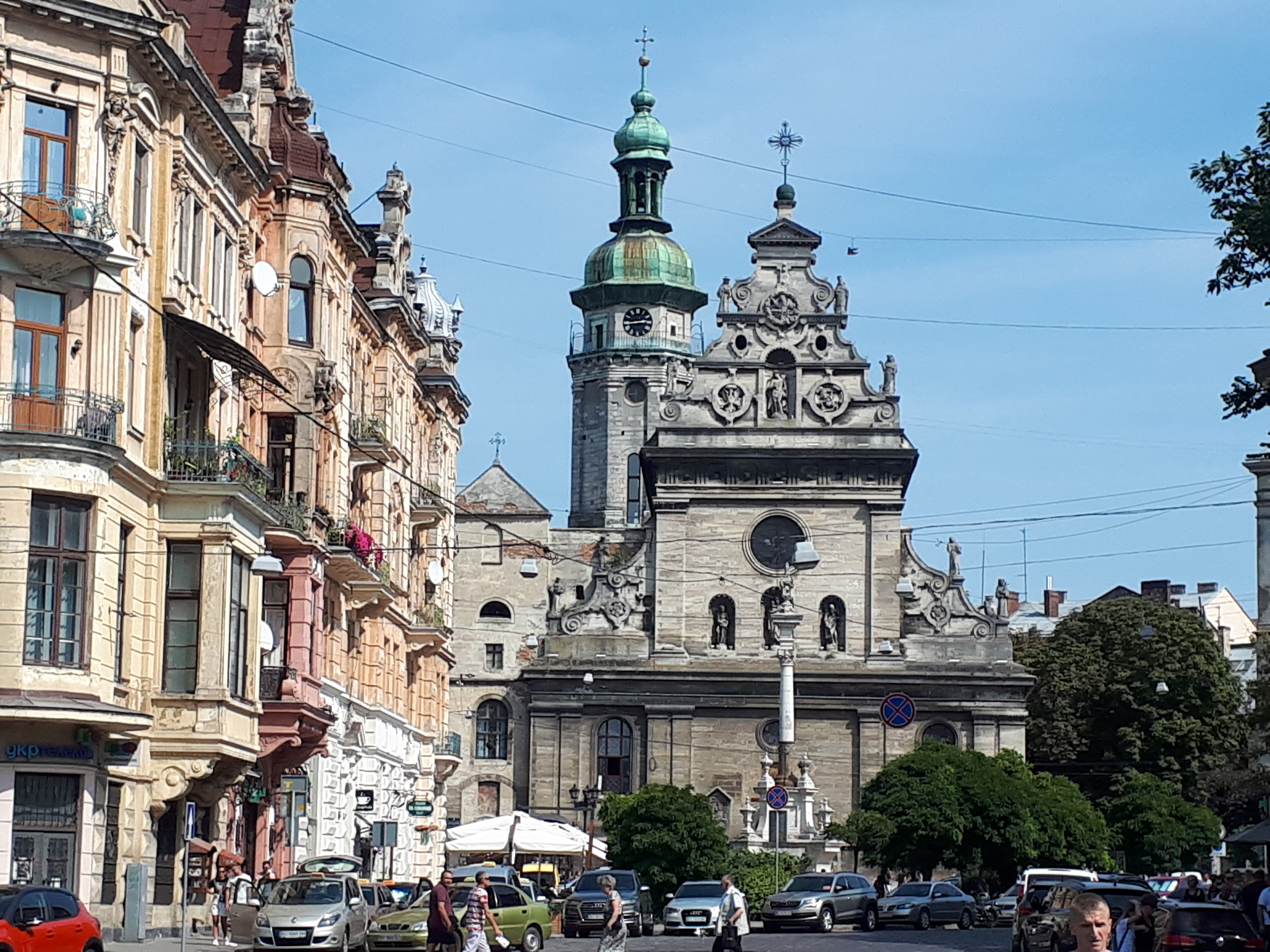
Bernardine Church

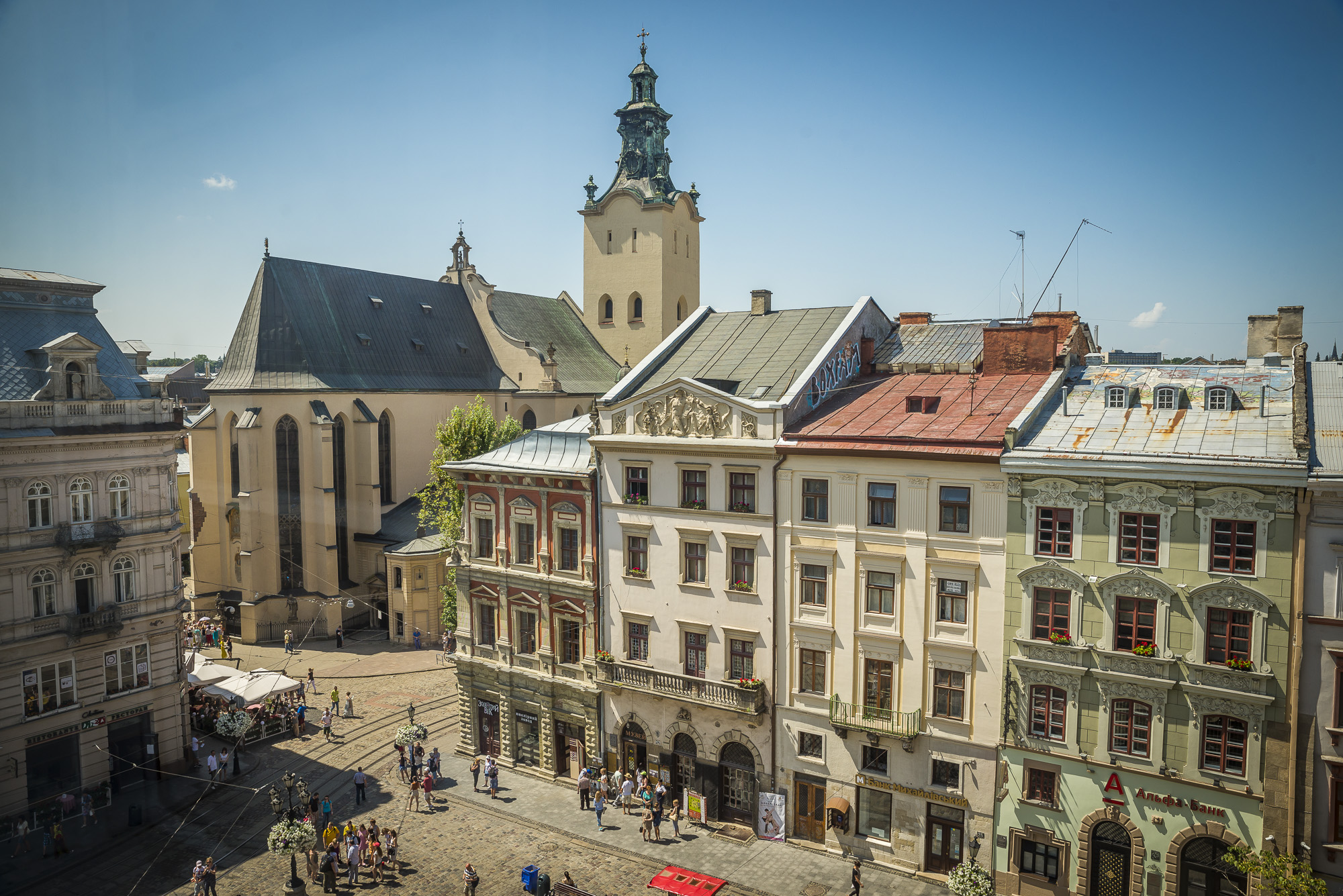
Latin Cathedral

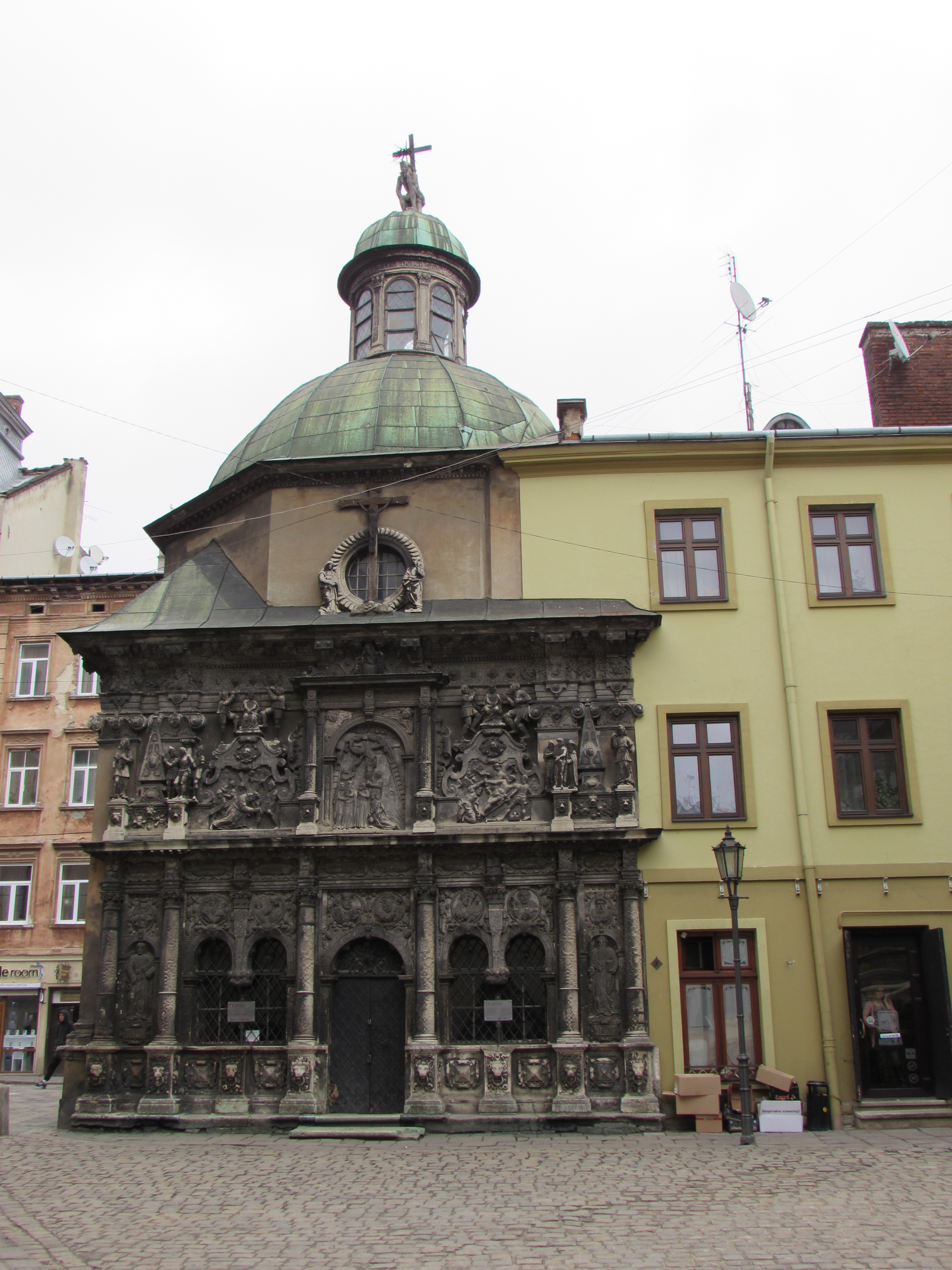
Boim Chapel

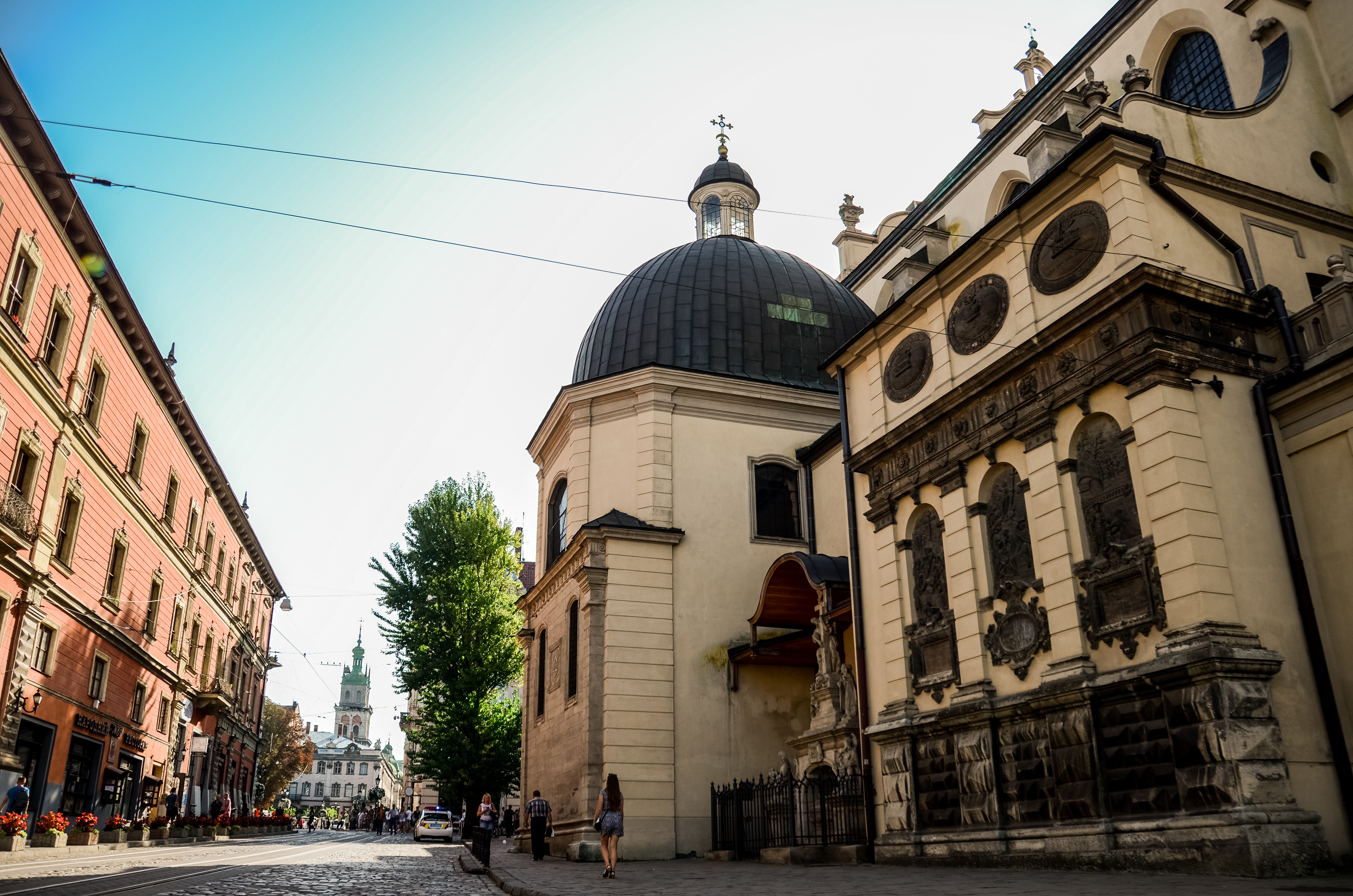
Kampian Chapel

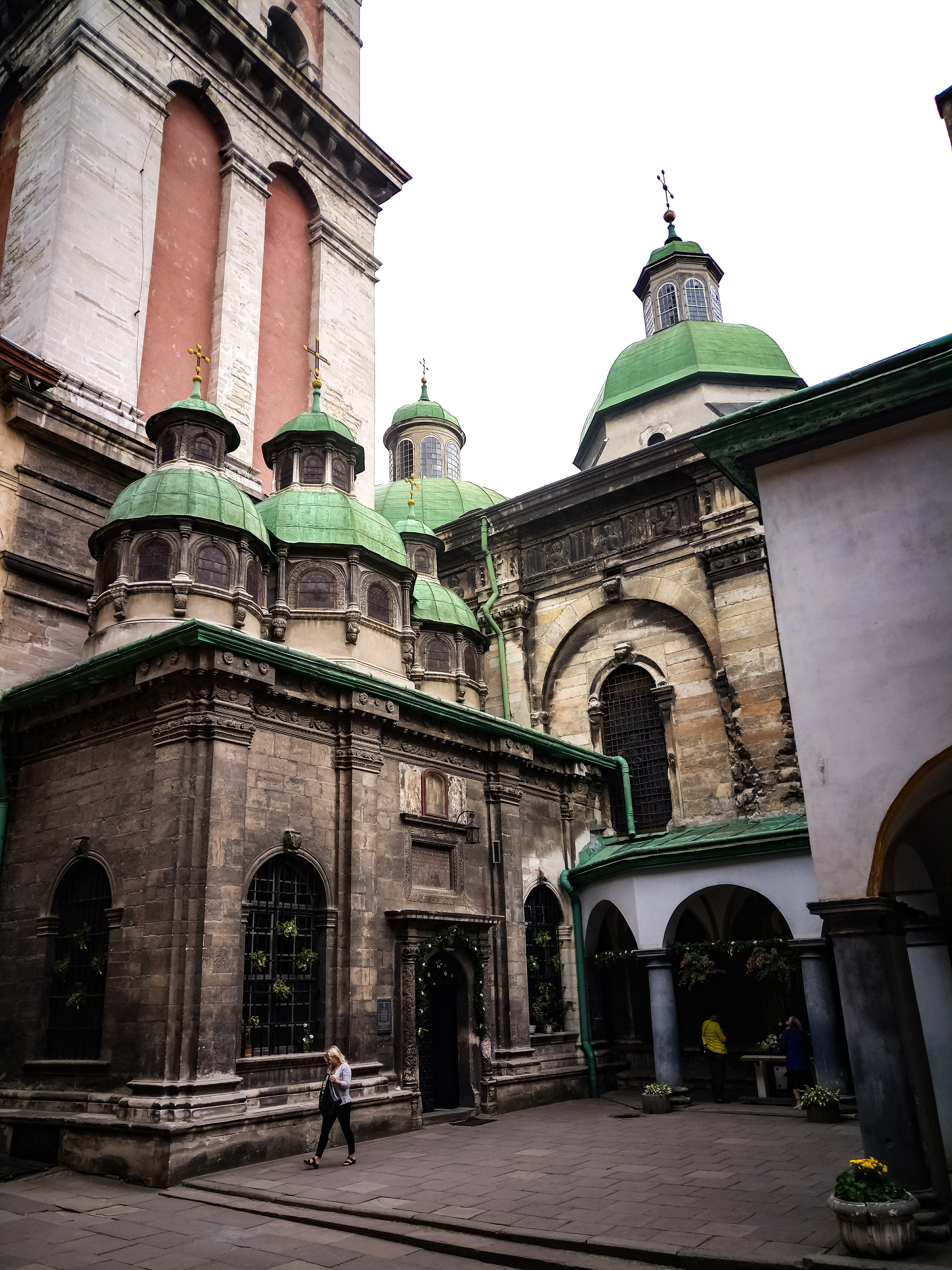
Church of the Dormition

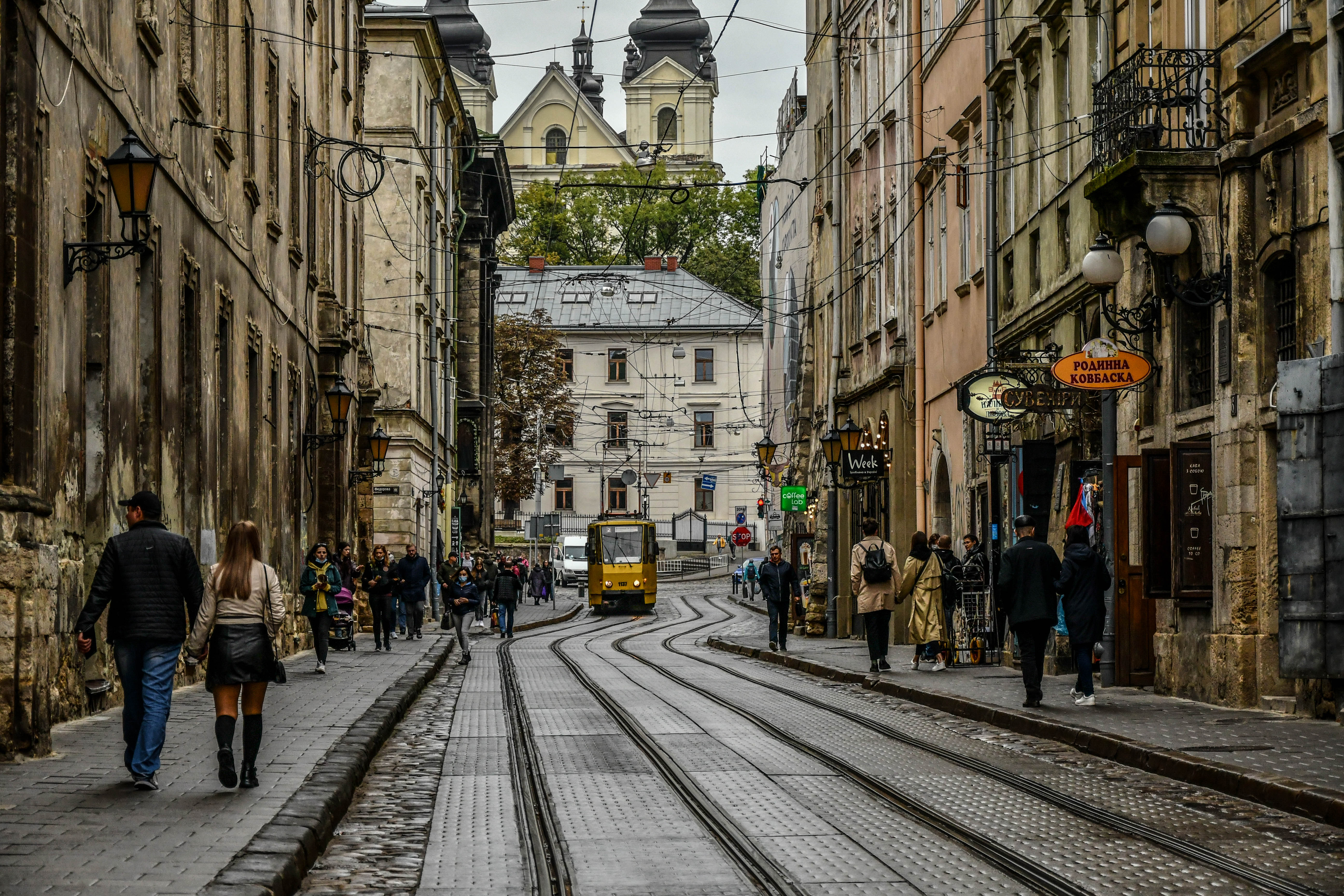
Tram in an Old Town street

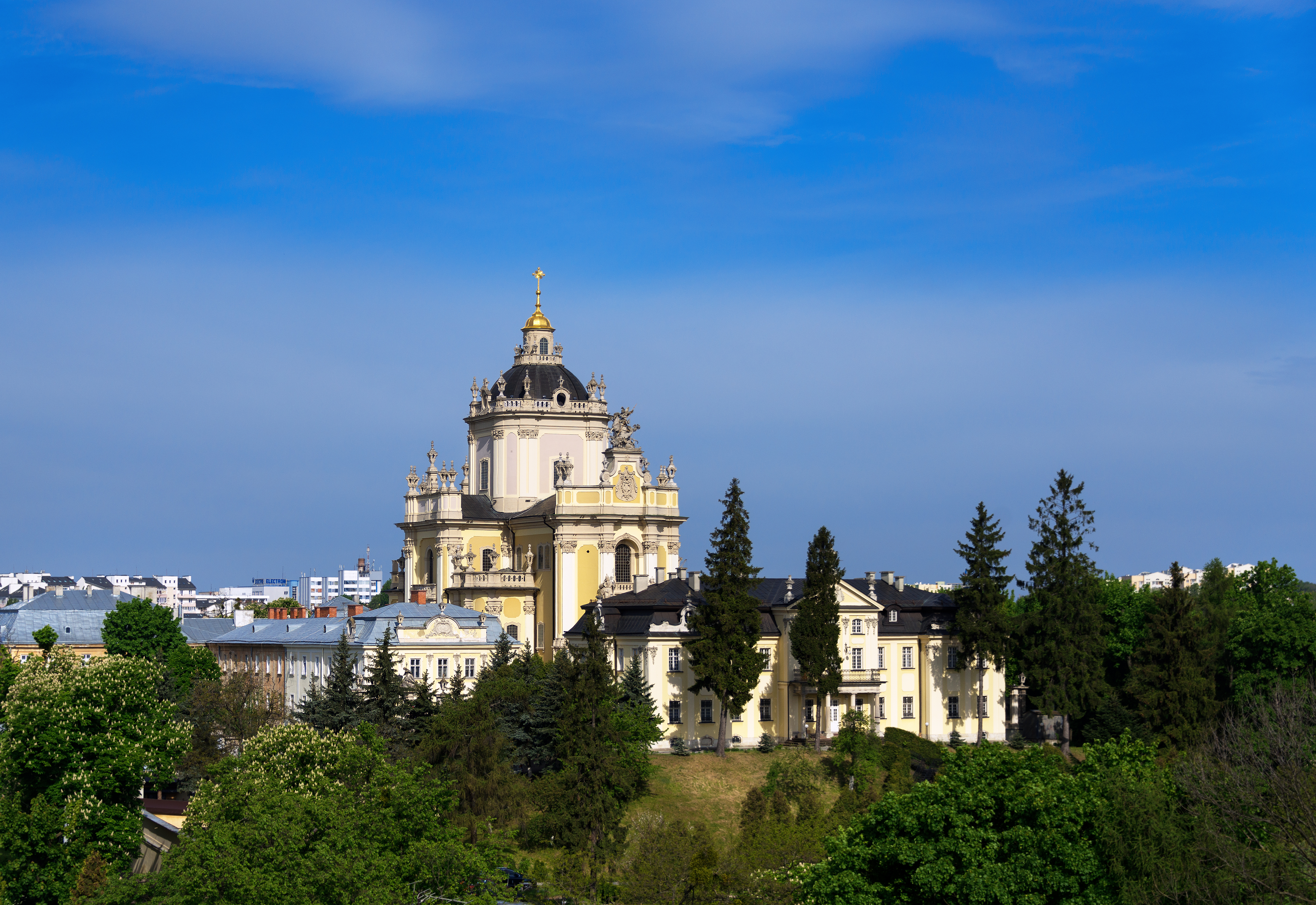
Saint George's Cathedral

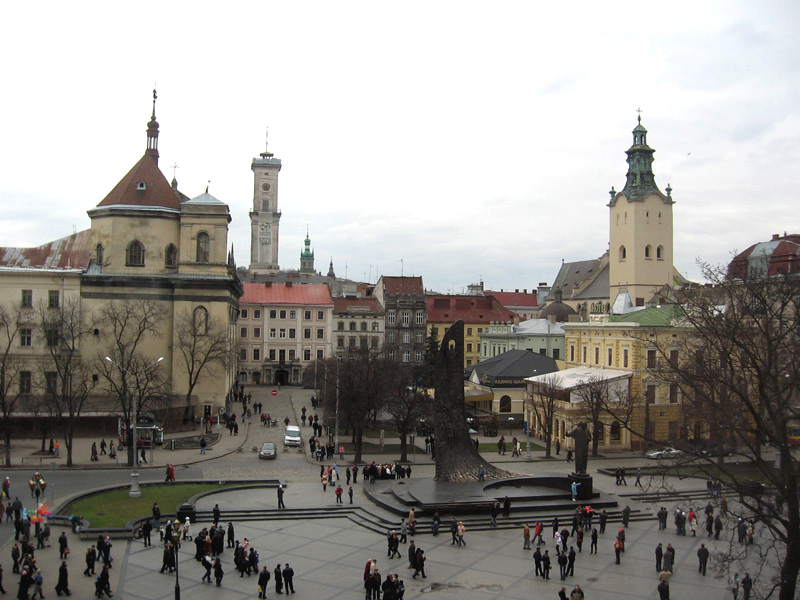
View of the Old Town from Freedom Avenue

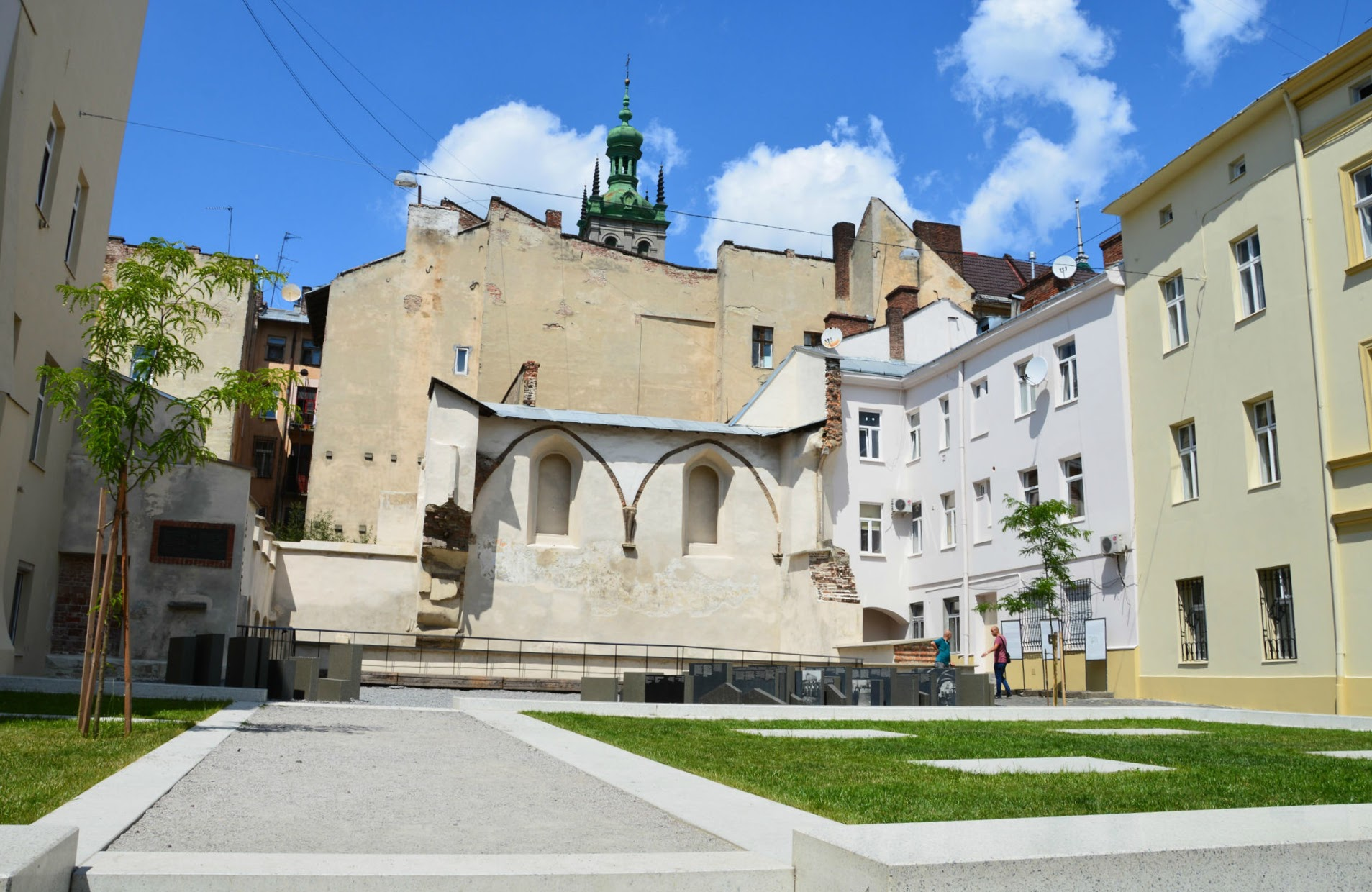
Site of the Golden Rose Synagogue

== See also ==
- List of historic reserves in Ukraine
