= Mickiewicz Square =

Square in Lviv, Ukraine

Coordinates: 49°50′22″N 24°01′48″E

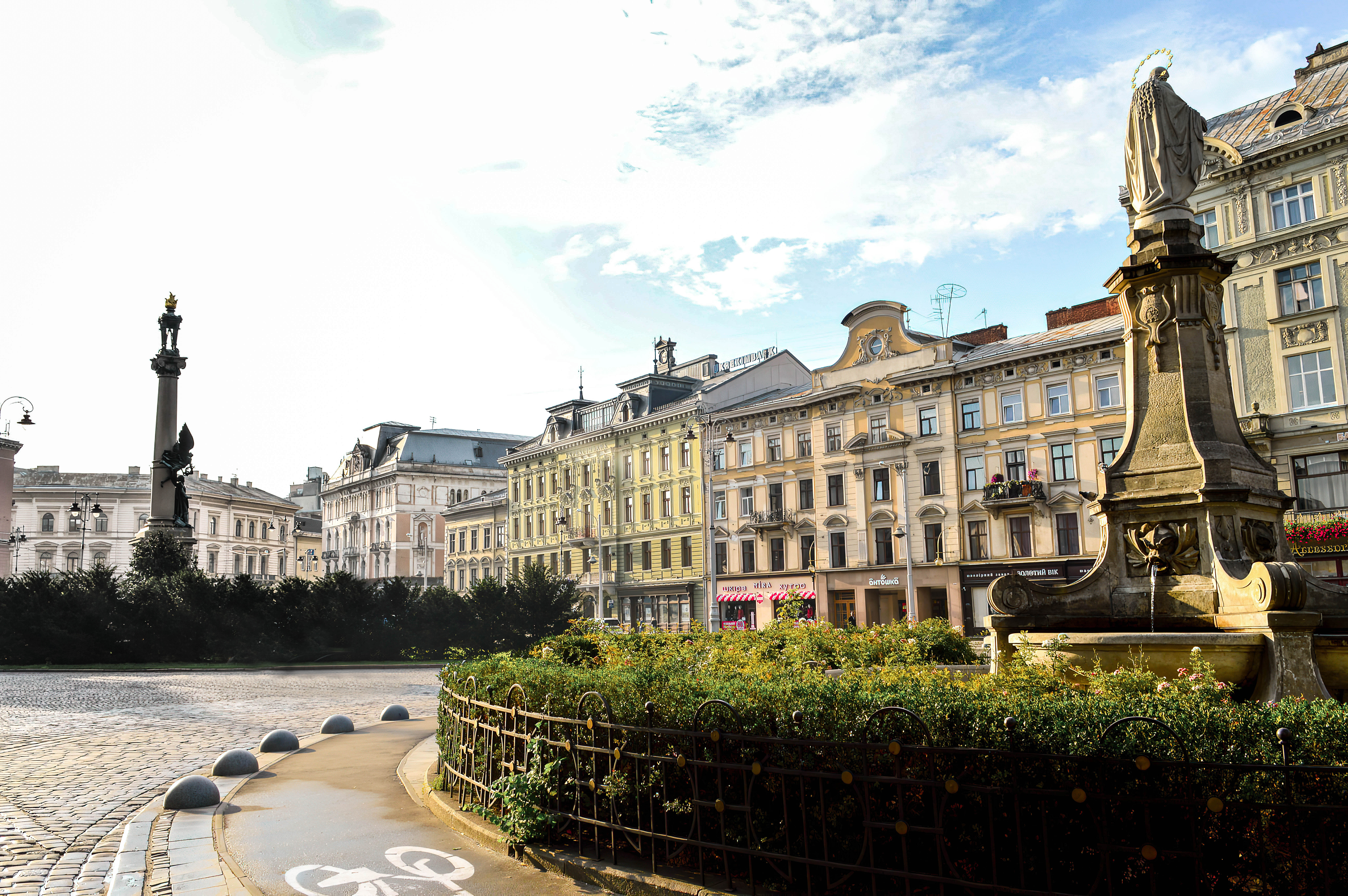
Mickiewicz square in 2017

The Mickiewicz Square (Ukrainian: Площа Міцкевича, romanized: Ploshcha Mitskevycha) is one of the main squares in the city of Lviv, Ukraine.

== Location and history ==
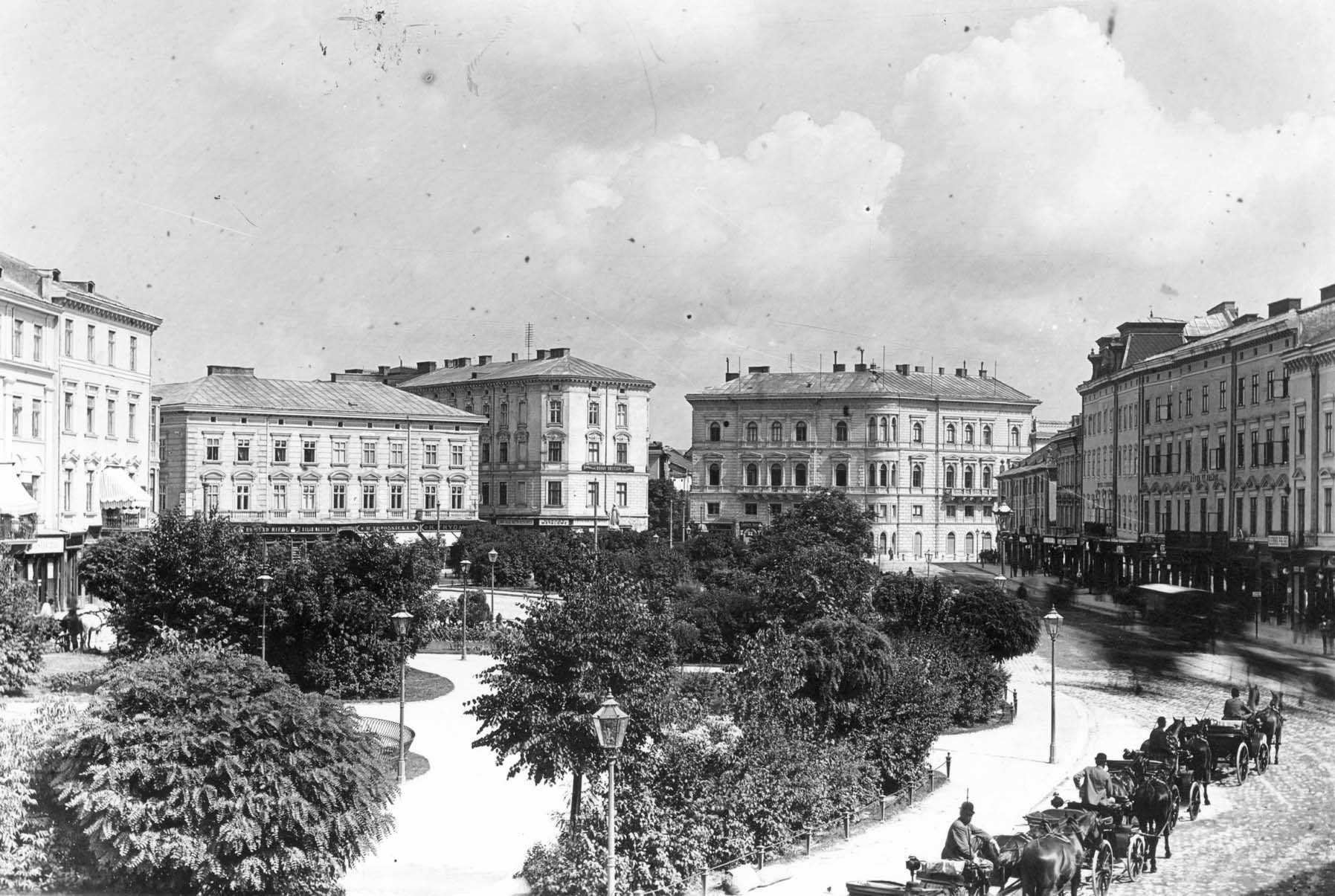
The southern side of the square at the beginning of the 20th century

The square, lying between Lviv's old town and the southern part of midtown, was planned and created in the first half of 19th century, after the demolition of the old town's defensive walls in the late 18th century. Primarily, from 1843 it was known as Ferdinand Square (German: Ferdinandplatz, Polish: Plac Ferdynanda), in honour of the Austrian governor of Galicia, Ferdinand Habsburg-d'Este. In 1862 it was renamed St Mary's Square (Polish: Plac Mariacki) when a monument dedicated to her was erected in the area. Today it bears the name of Polish poet Adam Mickiewicz, whose monument was placed in the central part of the square in 1904.

Lviv prior to World War II was inhabited mostly by Poles and Jews, and belonged to pre-war Poland. In 1939, the Soviet Union in the course of the Invasion of Poland annexed the city. As the new occupant administration perceived St Mary to be a rather inappropriate patron for a square in the centre of a Soviet city, the square underwent peculiar "secularisation" and was renamed Mickiewicz Square (Polish: Plac Mickiewicza, Russian: Площадь Мицкевича).

Although the majority of Polish Lvivians were expelled after the second and permanent Soviet annexation in 1945 and the city was repopulated with Ukrainian and Russian settlers, the monument wasn't demolished during the Soviet era – instead it was kept; as well as the name of the square.

== Adam Mickiewicz Column ==
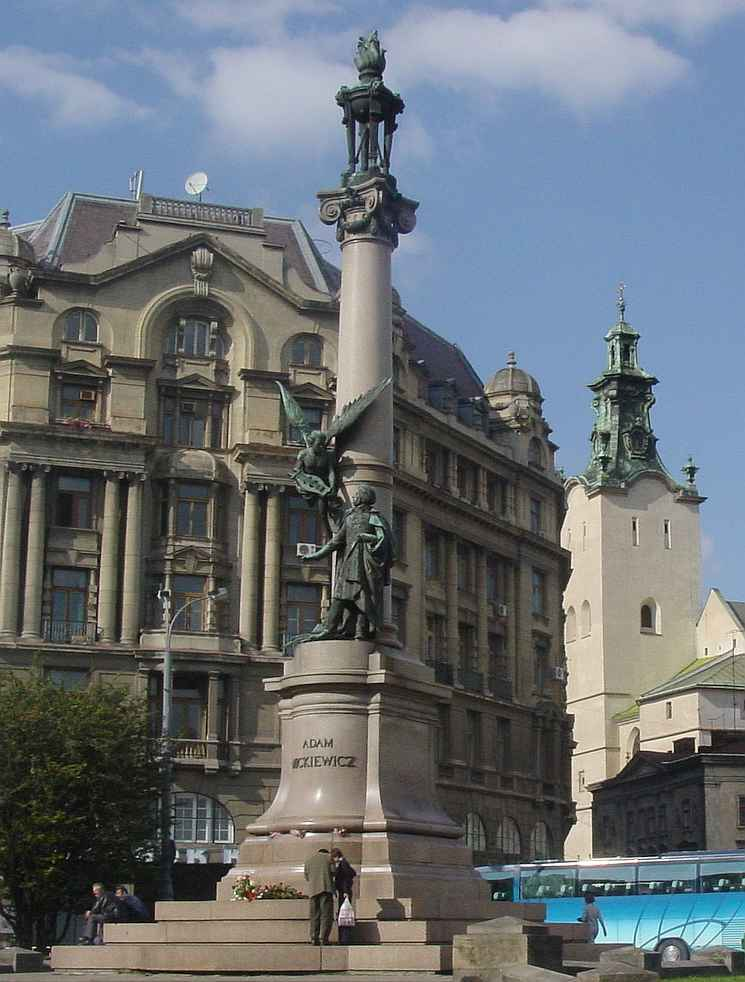
Mickiewicz's Column with the Sprecher tenement house (to the left), and the bell-tower of the Latin cathedral (to the right) in the background

The monument composes of a 21-metre-high column made of Italian granite, and a 3-metre-high statue of Mickiewicz being granted his poet's lyre by the genius of poetry, with some additional elements including the golden torch of Inspiration on the top of the column. Standing in the central part of the square, it was erected in 1904, with the official opening ceremony held on October 30. It was designed and carved by Polish sculptor Antoni Popiel, who won the contest for the design in 1898.

The rear of the column base contains the coat-of-arms of the Polish–Lithuanian Commonwealth.

== Other structures ==
- Monument to St Mary with adjacent fountain. The figure of St Mary, on the order of countess Seweryna Badeni, was sculpted in white, Trembovlian marble by Johann Nepomuk Hautmann from Munich in 1859, and brought to Lviv the same year. In 1904, when the monument of Mickiewicz was erected, the figure was moved north from the centre of the square and remodelled according to a competition won project by Michał Łużecki. In Soviet times, the figure was removed from the top of the fountain and placed in the Boim Chapel (since moved to St Andrew's Church). The fountain was topped with a vase instead. The original composition, including a copy of the St Mary figure, was reconstructed in 1997.
- Sprecher's tenement house (No.8 Mickiewicz Square). The six story high edifice with mansard roof, was ordered by Jonas and Gizela Sprecher and constructed between 1914 and 1922, according to a design by Ferdynand Kassler from Michał Ulam's architectural bureau. The architecture contains a mixture of neoclassical and early modernist features. Due to its height and size it was dubbed Lviv's first "skyscraper". The building was criticized for obscuring the view on Latin Cathedral and superseding the height of Mickiewicz monement.
- Hotel George (No.1 Mickiewicz Square). Constructed as a luxury hotel in 1900 according to a design by Viennese architects Ferdinand Fellner & Hermann Helmer with sculptural decoration by Leonard Marconi.
- Novotel hotel (No.9 Mickiewicz Square), constructed on the site of a 19th-century building demolished in 1997. In December 2025 the Supreme Court of Ukraine recognized the hotel's construction to be illegal, as the project had not been approved by the Ministry of Culture and UNESCO.
- Ukrsotsbank building (No.10 Mickiewicz Square), finished in 2005 on the site of a demolished 19th-century building. Nicknamed "toilet" by locals due to its architecture.
