= Hotel George (Lviv) =

Hotel in Lviv, Ukraine

- Готель Жорж
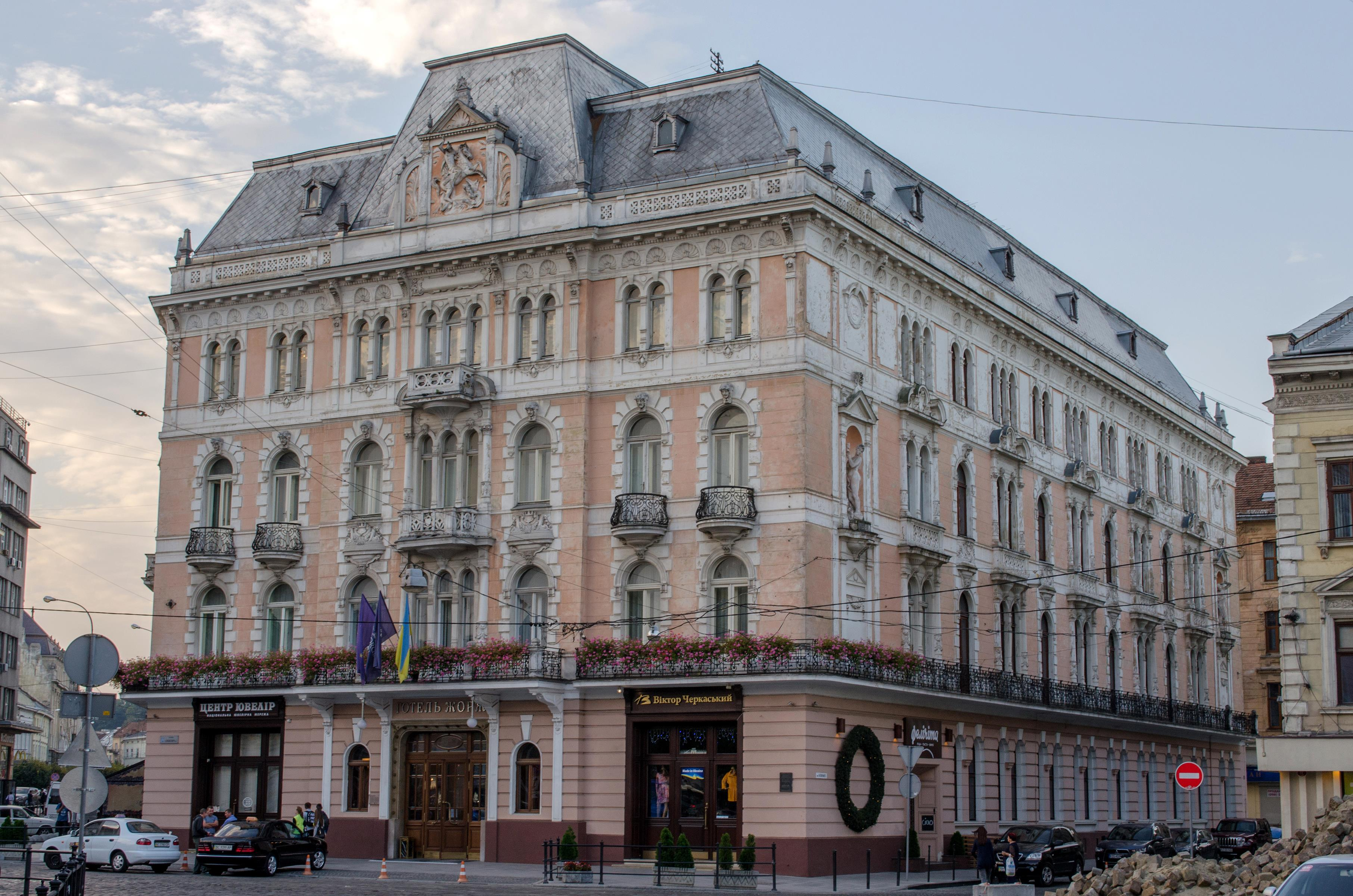

General information
- Location: 1 Mickiewicz Square, Lviv, Ukraine
- Coordinates: 49°50′19″N 24°01′50″E
- Construction started: 1899
- Construction stopped: 1900
- Opened: 8 January 1901

Design and construction
- Architects: Ferdinand Fellner; Hermann Helmer

Other information
- Number of rooms: 80

Website
- http://georgehotel.com.ua/

Hotel George is a hotel located in Lviv, Ukraine that was built in 1899–1900 and opened in 1901. It was designed by the Fellner & Helmer architecture studio.

== History ==
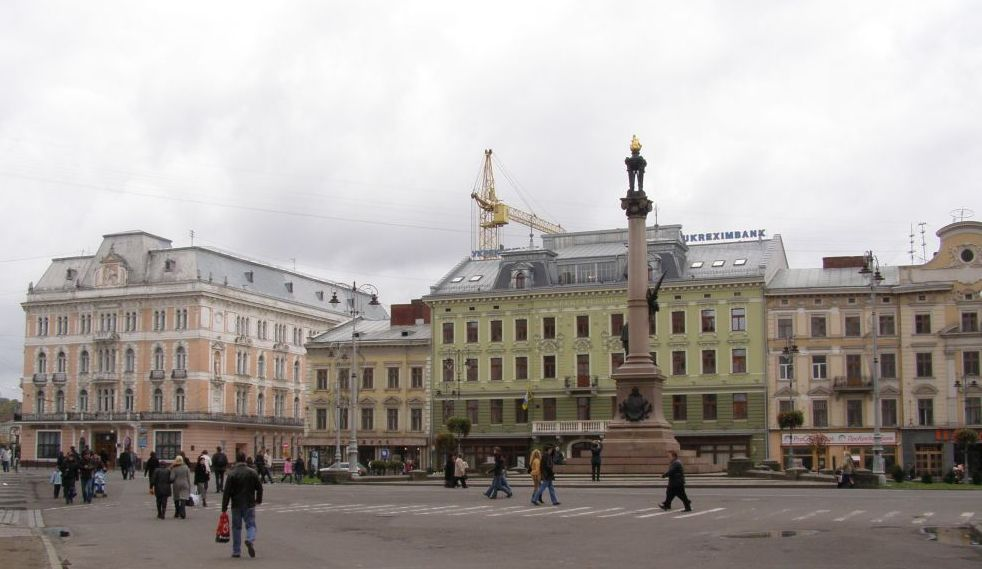
Street view

The history of the hotel dates back to 1793 when an inn was constructed on the site. In 1811 it was replaced by a new building called the Russie Hotel, a three-story hotel with two entrances. On the Chorążczyzna Street (now Tschaikowski Street) there was a large garden. The hotel was taken over in 1816 by the Lviv merchant, George Hofmann (1778–1839), whom the hotel was named after. It was demolished in 1899. The new building was constructed from 1899 to 1901 by Fellner & Helmer, with participation of the Lviv architects Iwan Lewiński and Julian Cybulski.

The new Hotel George was inaugurated on January 8, 1901. At the time, it had 93 rooms, including 32 luxury-class rooms. The hotel was extended by two floors in 1906. From 1910 to 1912, it housed Alfred Altenberg's bookstore on the ground floor. The hotel was completely renovated in 1927, and a fifth floor was added. In 1932 the reading room and restaurant were modernized by Tadeusz Wróbel.

During the periods of Soviet rule, from 1939 to 1941, and again from 1944 to 1990, it was administered by the Soviet travel agency Intourist and was renamed Intourist Hotel. During the Soviet period, the hotel was also popular with foreign guests. After Ukraine gained independence, the hotel was returned to its historical name, Hotel George.

Among notable guests who stayed at the hotel, Honoré de Balzac, Ethel Lilian Voynich, Franz von Liszt, Maurice Ravel, Jean-Paul Sartre, Leonid Brezhnev, and Józef Piłsudski.

== Architecture ==
The building is made of brick, with a high mansard roof. The original building had a dominant Italian Renaissance style, but through renovations over decades, it had added elements of Art Nouveau and Art Deco. In the niches there is sculptures of The Four Continents, a work by Leonard Marconi and Antoni Popiel that represents Africa, Asia, Europe, and America. The main façade shows a bas-relief of the original owner George Hofmann, a work by Popiel.
