= Adam Mickiewicz Monument, Lviv =

Adam Mickiewicz Monument in Lviv
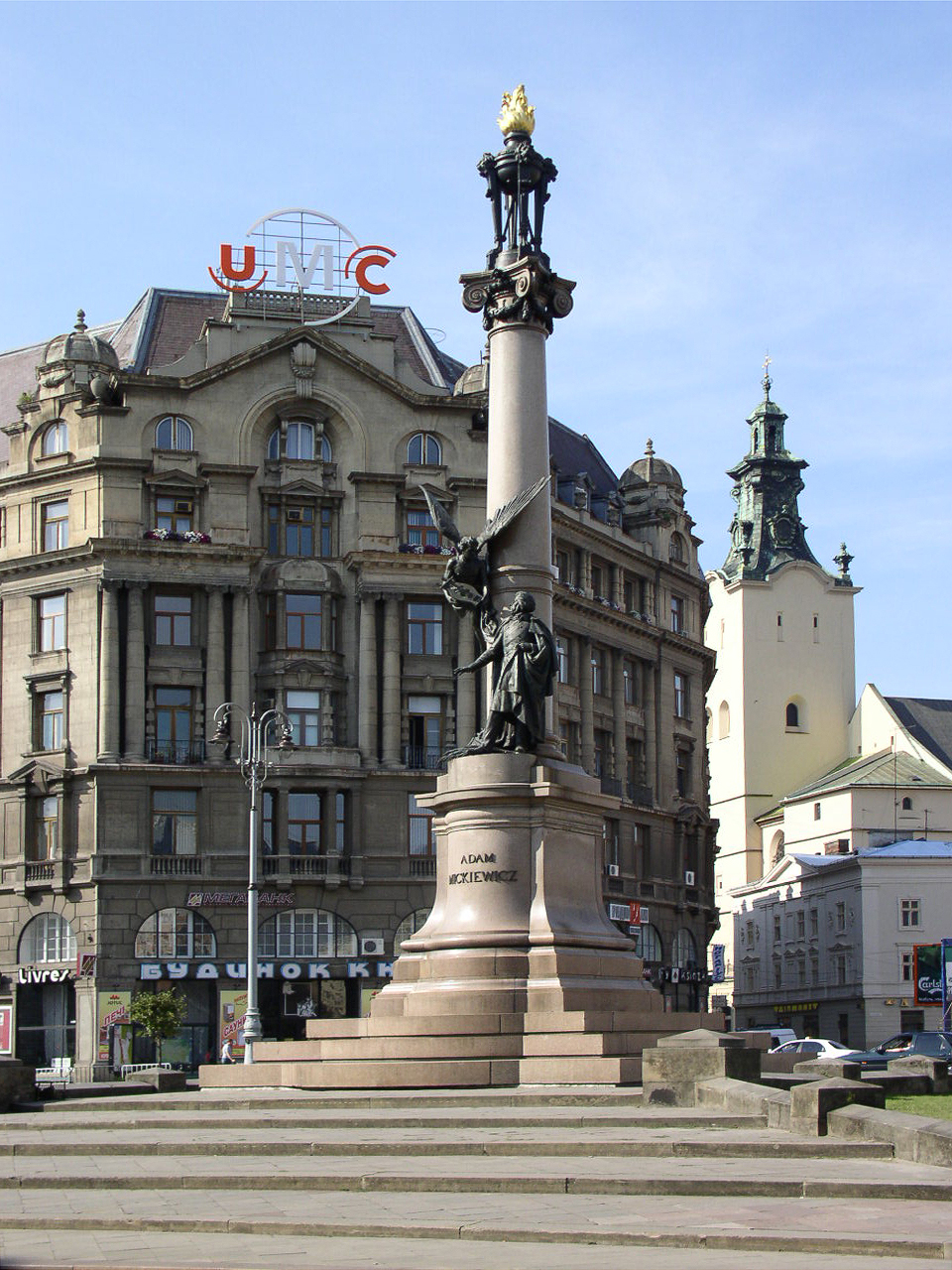
- View of the Adam Mickiewicz Monument in Lviv, 2006
- Interactive map of Adam Mickiewicz Monument in Lviv
- Location: Lviv, Ukraine
- Coordinates: 49°50′22″N 24°01′48″E
- Designer: Antoni Popiel
- Type: column
- Material: bronze, granite
- Height: 21 m (69 ft)
- Opening date: 30 October 1904
- Dedicated to: Adam Mickiewicz

Immovable Monument of National Significance of Ukraine
- Official name: Пам'ятник поету Адаму Міцкевичу (Monument to the poet Adam Mickiewicz)
- Type: Monumental Art
- Reference no.: 130009-Н

The Adam Mickiewicz Monument (Ukrainian: Пам'ятник Адамові Міцкевичу, romanized: Pamiatnyk Adamovi Mitskevychu), also known as the Adam Mickiewicz Column (Polish: Kolumna Adama Mickiewicza we Lwowie), is a Neo-classical column commemorating the Polish Romantic poet Adam Mickiewicz (1798–1855) located at the Mickiewicz Square in the centre of Lviv, Ukraine, and opened in 1904.

== History ==
In 1897, a committee headed by Władysław Łoziński and devoted to the construction of a monument in Lviv, Kingdom of Galicia and Lodomeria, dedicated to Romantic-era poet Adam Mickiewicz was established. In 1898, a contest to design it was launched and, out of 28 projects, the jury selected the one designed by Polish sculptor Antoni Popiel. On the initiative of Adam Krechowiecki, it was agreed that the monument should take the form of a column. The monument was built between 1902 and 1904 and was officially unveiled on 30 October 1904. It features the national poet of Poland Adam Mickiewicz at the foot of the column above whom there is a sculpture of a winged Genius of Poetry handing a lyre to the poet. A large candle light is located at the top of the 21-metre tall column.

The monument was erected at the Mariacki Square (currently Mickiewicz Square) near the figure of Virgin Mary. The granite shaft of the column was transported from the Kingdom of Italy while the bronze elements were cast in Teodor Serpek's factory in Vienna. The figure of Adam Mickiewicz is 3.3 metres (10.8 ft) tall and the flame atop the candle light is gilded. The monument emerged completely unscathed after the Second World War.

The column is one of the Polish national monuments which remained in Lviv after the war, unlike the John III Sobieski Monument or Aleksander Fredro Monument, which were transferred to Gdańsk and Wrocław respectively, based on an additional protocol to the 1944 agreement between the Polish Committee of National Liberation (Polski Komitet Wyzwolenia Narodowego, PKWN) and the Ukrainian SSR signed in Kyiv (1945), which allowed to hand over to the Polish government the national monuments in Lviv connected to Polish culture and history with the exception of the Adam Mickiewicz Monument which "enjoys great popularity and is loved by the Ukrainian nation".

At the time of installation, the monument was almost the most expensive monument. Money was collected for it for 6 years.

== Gallery ==
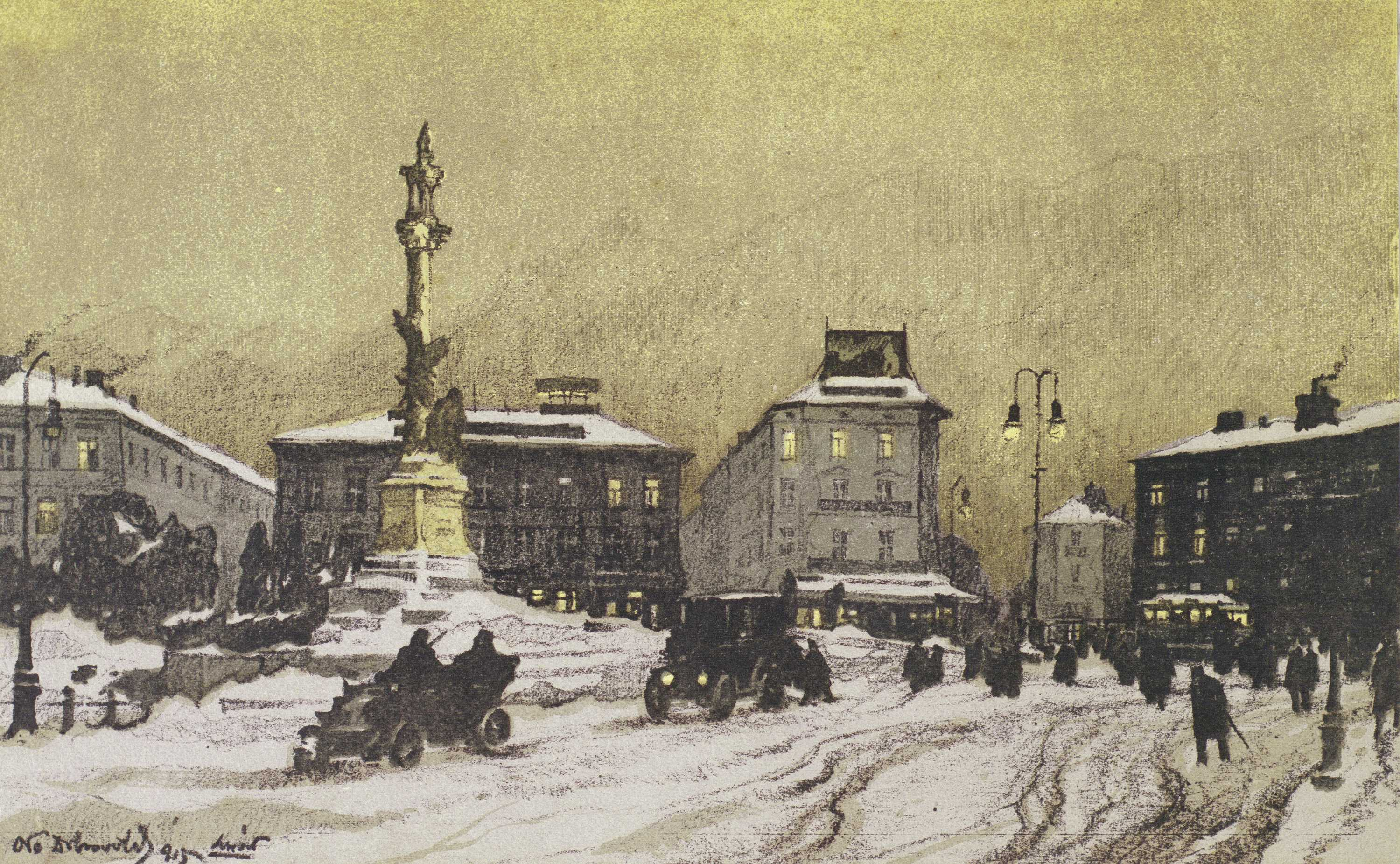
Odo Dobrowolski's litography depicting the Adam Mickiewicz Column, 1915

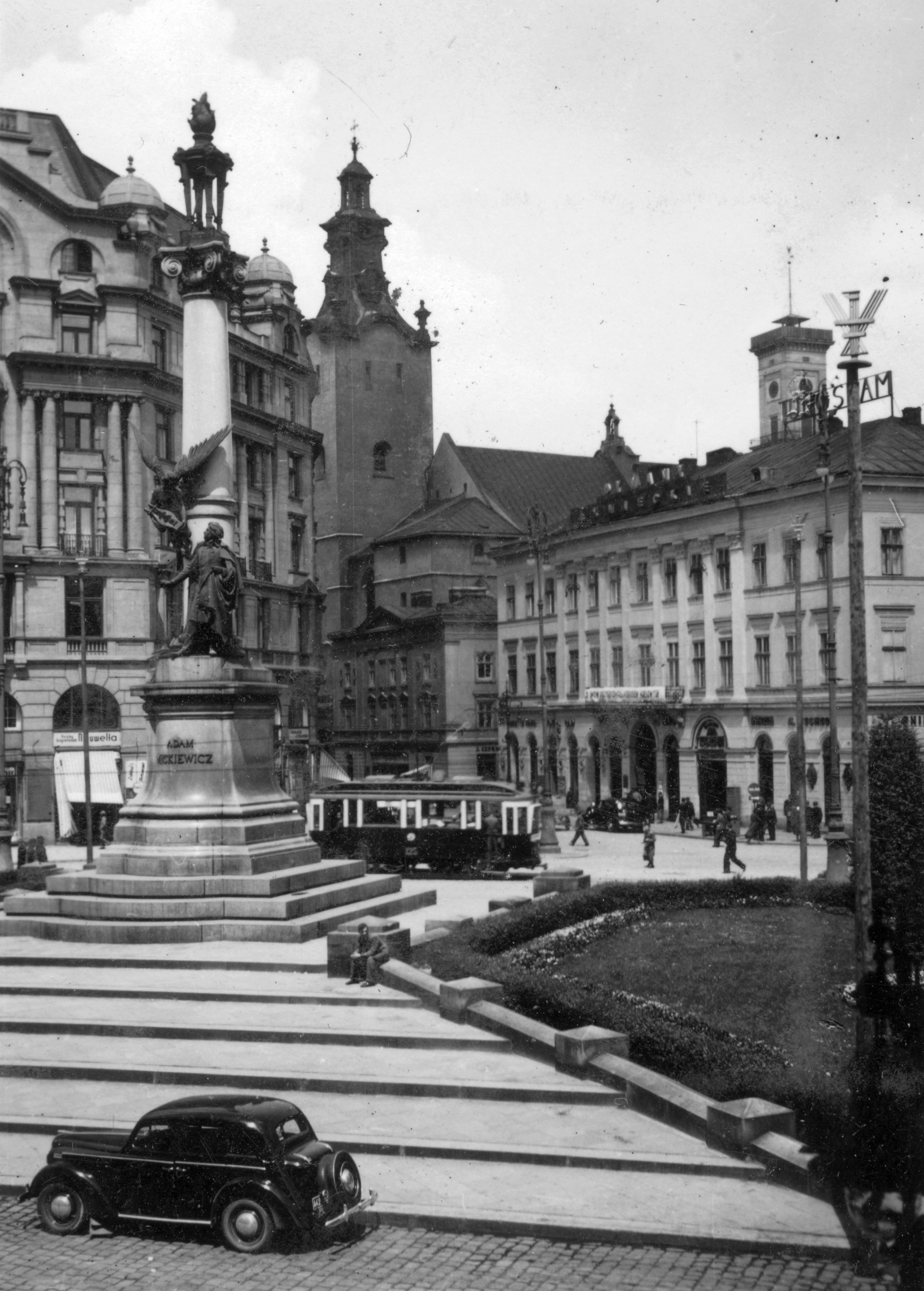
View of the column before the outbreak of WWII, 1939

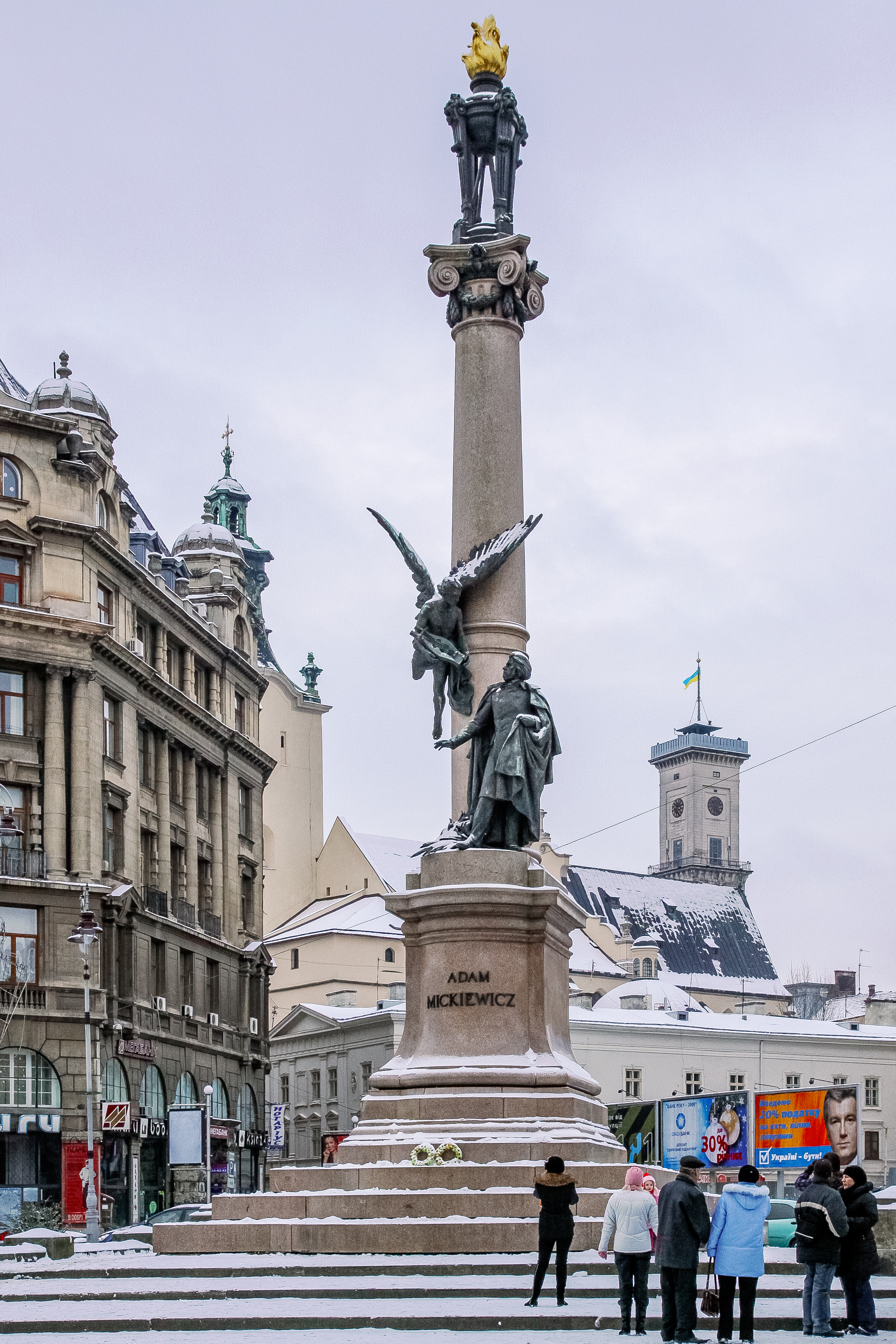
Adam Mickiewicz Monument, 2004

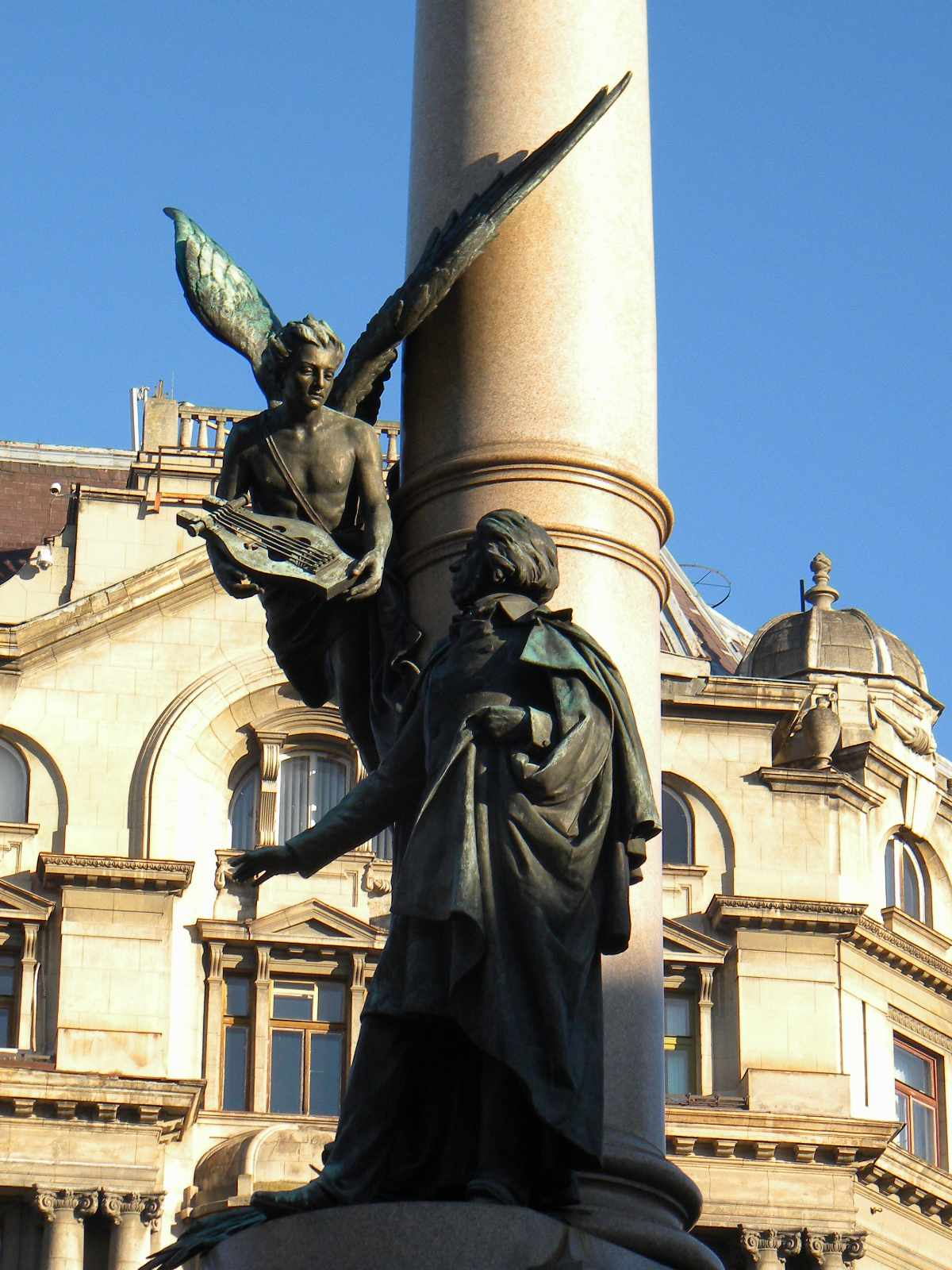
Adam Mickiewicz and the winged figure of Genius of Poetry

== See also ==
- History of Lviv
- John III Sobieski Monument in Gdańsk
- Aleksander Fredro Monument in Wrocław
