= Aleksander Fredro Monument =

Aleksander Fredro Monument pomnik Aleksandra Fredry
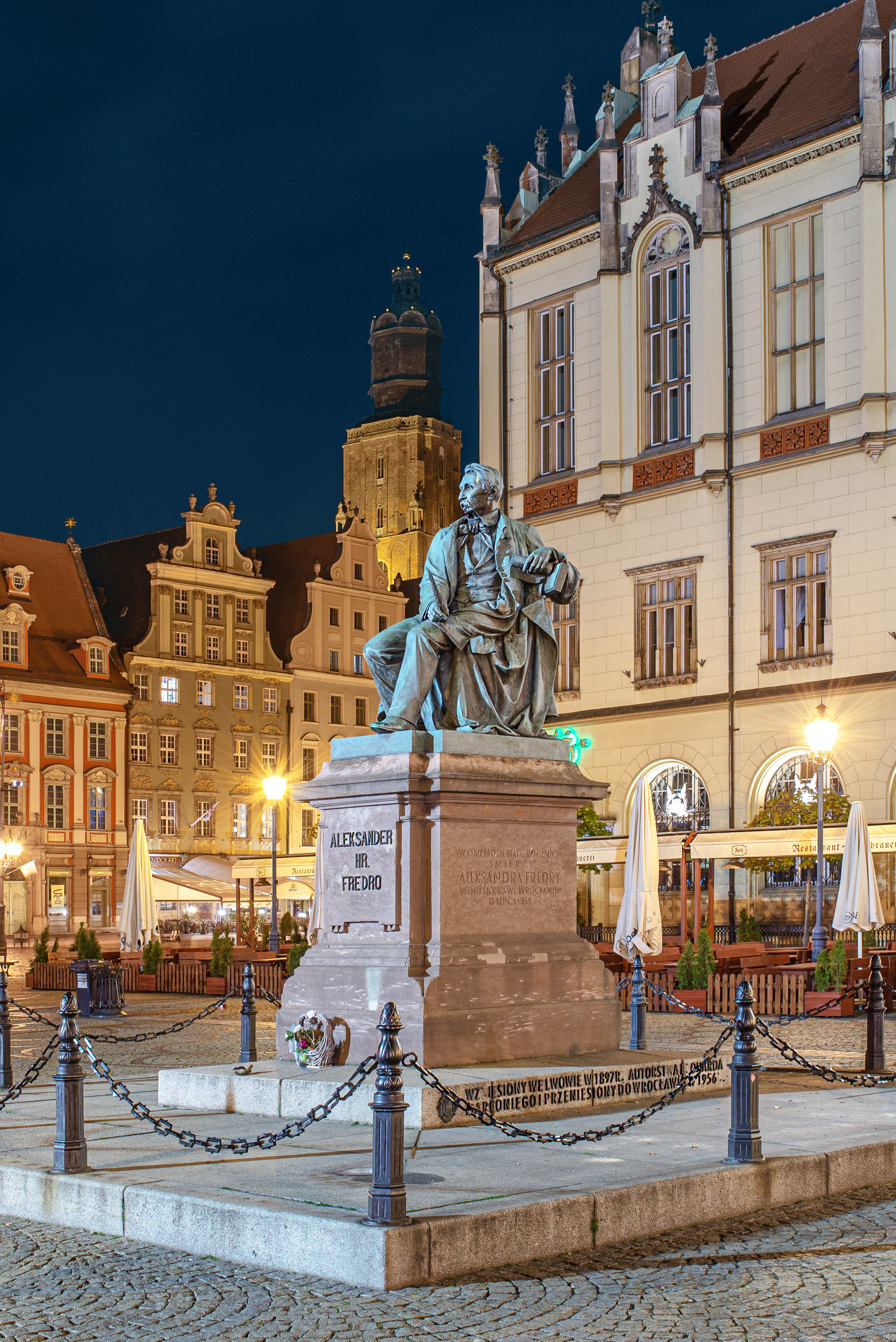
- The monument at night
- Interactive map of Aleksander Fredro Monument pomnik Aleksandra Fredry
- Location: Wrocław, Poland
- Coordinates: 51°06′35″N 17°01′53″E
- Designer: Leonard Marconi
- Material: bronze
- Completion date: 1897
- Opening date: October 24, 1897 (Lwów); July 15, 1956 (Wrocław)
- Dedicated to: Aleksander Fredro

Historic Monument of Poland
- Designated: 1994-09-08
- Part of: Wrocław – historic city center
- Reference no.: M.P. 1994 nr 50 poz. 425

The Aleksander Fredro Monument (Polish: Pomnik Aleksandra Fredry) is a bronze statue located in Wrocław, Poland dedicated to Polish Romantic-era poet, playwright and author Aleksander Fredro. Originally built in Lwów (German: Lemberg) in 1897 according to Leonard Marconi's design, the monument was transferred to Wrocław in 1956.

== History ==
The monument was designed by sculptor Leonard Marconi in 1897 in Lemberg (Lwów), Austria-Hungary (present-day Lviv, Ukraine) and cast in bronze. The Neo-classical sculpture features playwright Aleksander Fredro on a sandstone pedestal with inscriptions on three sides wearing a chamarre and holding a roll of paper and a goose quill.

The monument was funded by the Lwów Artistic and Literary Society (Lwowskie Koło Literacko-Artystyczne) and ceremonially unveiled on October 24, 1897, at the Academic Square (currently Shevchenko Avenue) in Lwów in the presence of many prominent dignitaries including the Land Marshal of Galicia Stanisław Marcin Badeni, prince Eustachy Sanguszko, archbishop Izaak Mikołaj Isakowicz, and mayor of Lwów Godzimir Małachowski. The monument occupied that location until 1950. After the Second World War, the city was incorporated into the USSR and in 1945 in Kyiv, the Polish delegation signed an additional protocol to the 1944 agreement between the Polish Committee of National Liberation and the Ukrainian SSR, which allowed to hand over to the Polish government the national monuments in Lviv connected to Polish culture and history with the exception of the Adam Mickiewicz Monument which "enjoys great popularity and is loved by the Ukrainian nation".

== Transfer to Poland ==
The monument was transferred to Poland in March 1950. It was initially displayed in Wilanów where it remained until 1956. The city of Wrocław was chosen to host it as that after the war a great number of Poles from Lviv were repatriated there. Besides this, Aleksander Fredro visited Wrocław in the past as a young military officer fighting alongside Napoleon. Various locations for the monument were considered (including near the University of Wrocław and the Ossolineum), but ultimately it was unveiled on July 15, 1956, at the Wrocław Market Square in the place previously occupied by the Monument to Frederick William III of Prussia. It was the first monument to be erected in a public space in Wrocław after 1945.

== See also ==
- John III Sobieski Monument, Gdańsk
- Tadeusz Kościuszko Monument, Kraków
- Prince Józef Antoni Poniatowski Monument, Warsaw
