= Tadeusz Kościuszko Monument, Kraków =

Equestrian statue honoring the Polish military hero

Coordinates: 50°03′18″N 19°56′06″E

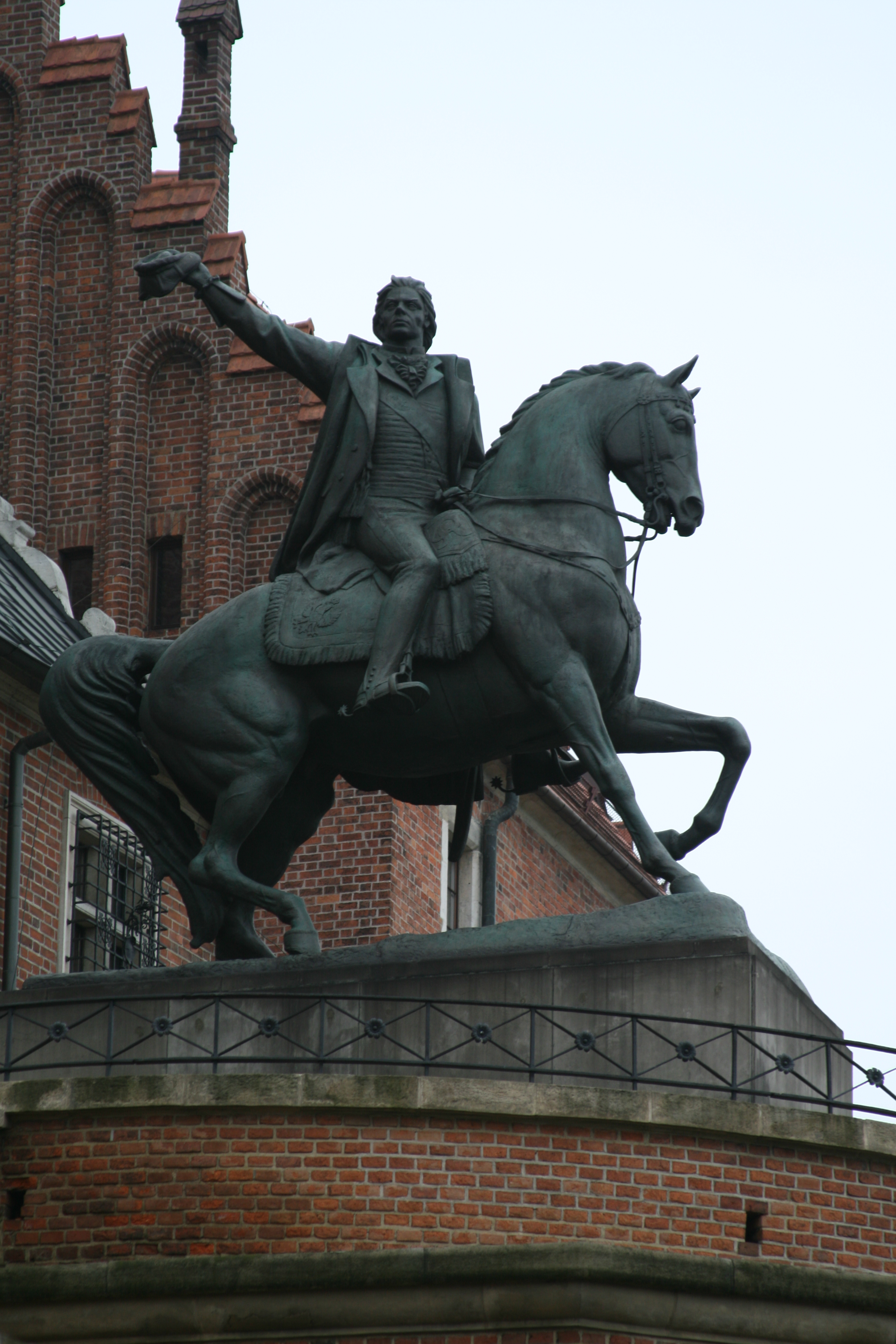
Tadeusz Kościuszko Monument, Wawel Castle, Kraków

The Tadeusz Kościuszko Monument in Kraków (Polish: Pomnik Tadeusza Kościuszki w Krakowie) is one of the best-known bronze monuments in Poland.

It is the work of artists Leonard Marconi, Warsaw-born professor of Lviv University; and his son-in-law, sculptor Antoni Popiel.

The equestrian bronze statue of Kościuszko—hero of Polish and American wars of national independence—is located along the west entrance to Wawel Castle in Kraków's Old Town.

== History ==
The statue was cast in 1900 thanks to the efforts of newly formed Tadeusz Kościuszko Society, soon after Marconi's death. The Austrian government during the time of imperial partitions of Poland refused to issue the permit for its placement. It was erected no less than twenty years later in 1920-24 once the Polish state reestablished its independence following World War I. The statue was destroyed by the Germans in 1940 during the Nazi German occupation of Poland. Its current replica, erected in 1960, is a gift to the City of Kraków from the people of Dresden, Germany. Its duplicate was also erected in Detroit, Michigan, in 1978, as a gift from the people of Kraków, in celebration of the United States Bicentennial.

In Kościuszko's times, the Polish state had been twice partitioned by its neighbors: Russia, Habsburg monarchy, and Prussia by early 1793. In 1794, Kościuszko initiated an insurrection in the Kraków's Main Square which, in spite of his victorious Battle of Racławice against numerically superior Russian army, resulted in a tragic third and final partition of Poland. Kraków became part of the Austrian province of Galicia for over a century. Prior to leading the 1794 Uprising, Kościuszko had fought in the American Revolutionary War as a colonel in the Continental Army. In 1783, in recognition of his service, he had been brevetted by the Continental Congress to the rank of brigadier general and granted citizenship of the United States. Tadeusz Kościuszko died in Switzerland on October 15, 1817. His body was first buried in a crypt of a Jesuit church in Solothurn, from where he was moved a year later to the St. Leonard's Crypt at the Wawel Cathedral, next to where his monument now stands.

== See also ==
- John III Sobieski Monument in Gdańsk
- Monument to Prince Józef Poniatowski in Warsaw
