= Antoni Popiel =

Polish sculptor (1865–1910)

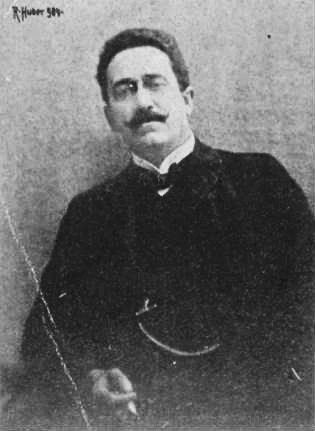
- Popiel c. 1911
- Born: 13 June 1865; Szczakowa, Austria Hungary
- Died: 7 July 1910 (aged 45); Velykyi Liubin, Russian Empire
- Education: Jan Matejko Academy of Fine Arts in Kraków; Academy of Fine Arts Vienna
- Known for: sculpture
- Notable work: Tadeusz Kościuszko Monument, Kraków, 1900; Adam Mickiewicz Column, 1904; Tadeusz Kościuszko Monument, Warsaw, 1910

Antoni Popiel (13 June 1865 – 7 July 1910) was a Polish sculptor.

== Life ==
He studied at the School of Fine Arts, Kraków from 1882 to 1884, with Izydor Jabłoński, Władysław Łuszczkiewicz and Walery Gadomski. He studied at the Academy of Fine Arts Vienna, from 1885 to 1888.

In 1888, he studied in Berlin and Florence, and returned to Poland. He lived first in Kraków, then in Lviv, including a job as assistant to Leonard Marconi, at the Faculty of Drawing and modeling of the Lviv Polytechnic. He remained connected with it for life. In 1894, he created sculptures decorating the entrance to the Palace of the Arts (Polish: Pałac sztuki) constructed for the General National Exhibition in Lviv. He stayed in Florence, from 1895 to 1897, where he made a statue of Justitia for the lobby of the Palace of Justice in Lviv (1896), and the design of the monument of Józef Korzeniowski, which was then erected in Brody. In 1898, he won a competition for a monument to Adam Mickiewicz University in Lviv. The monument, in the form of a tall column topped with a Torch of Poetry, was unveiled on 30 October 1904. After the death of Leonardo Marconi, Antoni Popiel continued work on the statue of Tadeusz Kosciuszko in Kraków. The monument stood on the Wawel hill. During World War II, in 1940, it was destroyed by the Germans, and reconstructed in 1960.

In 1900, he designed sculptures for the Grand Theatre in Lviv - tympanum, stone caryatids; and statues of the Muses. In 1907, he participated in the competition for a monument to Tadeusz Kosciuszko in Washington, D.C. Although he won second prize, President Theodore Roosevelt selected his design for implementation. Between 1902 and 1904, he designed the allegorical figures which were placed at the main entrance to the Lviv Railway Station.

His brother was the panorama painter, Tadeusz Popiel.

== Death ==
He died on 7 July 1910 in Velykyi Liubin and was buried at the Lychakiv Cemetery in Lviv.

== Gallery ==
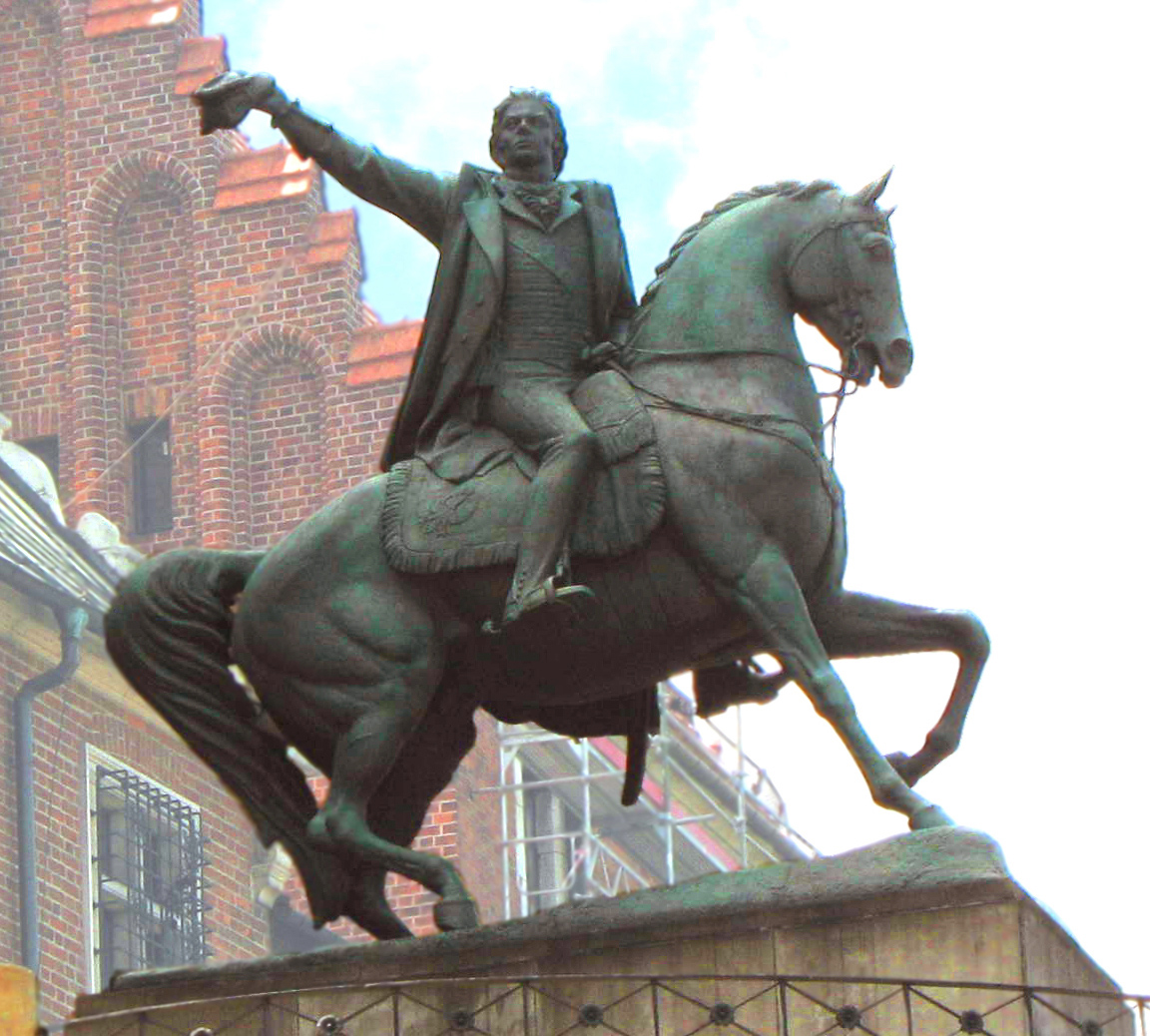
Tadeusz Kościuszko Monument, Kraków

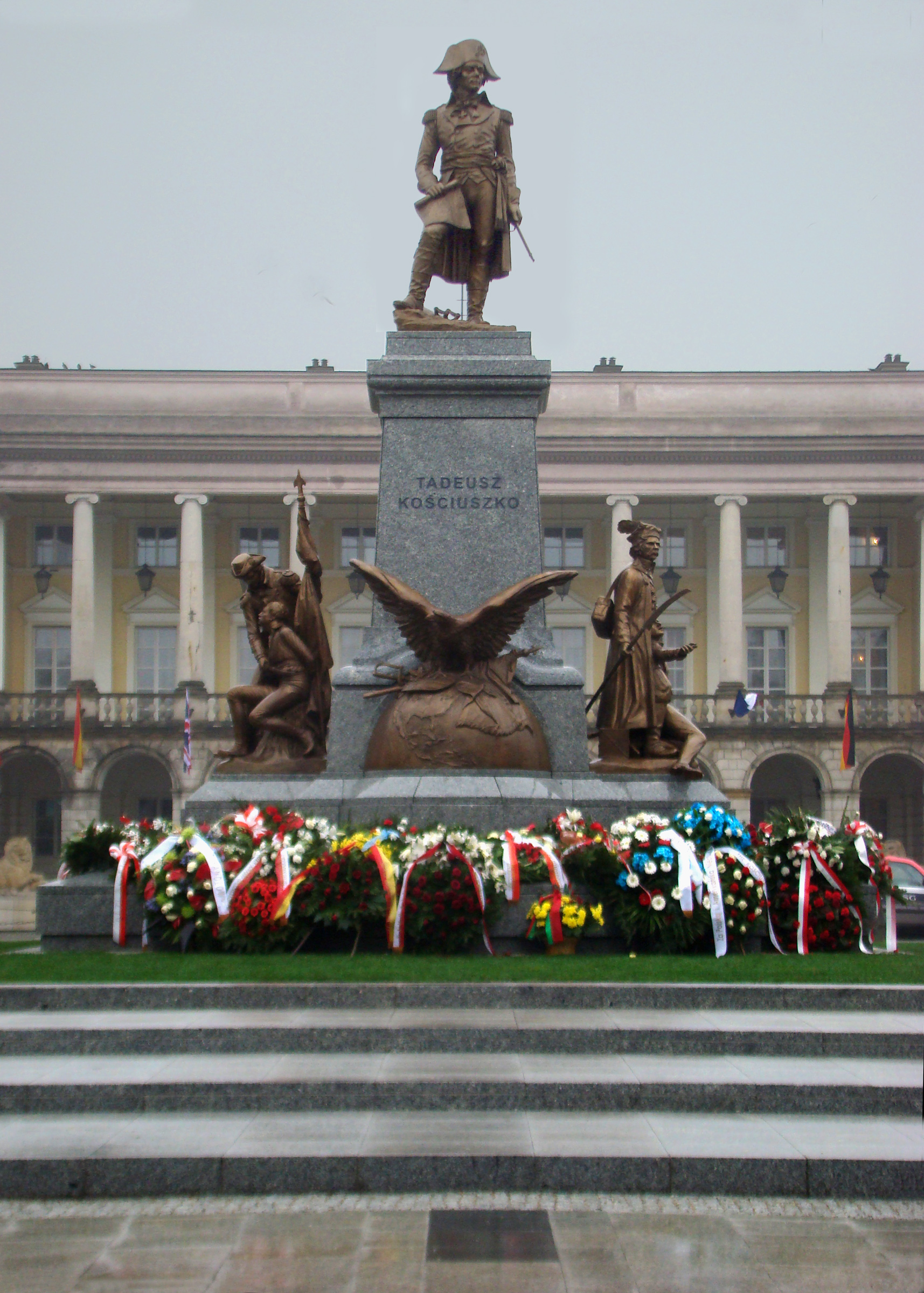
Tadeusz Kościuszko Monument, Warsaw

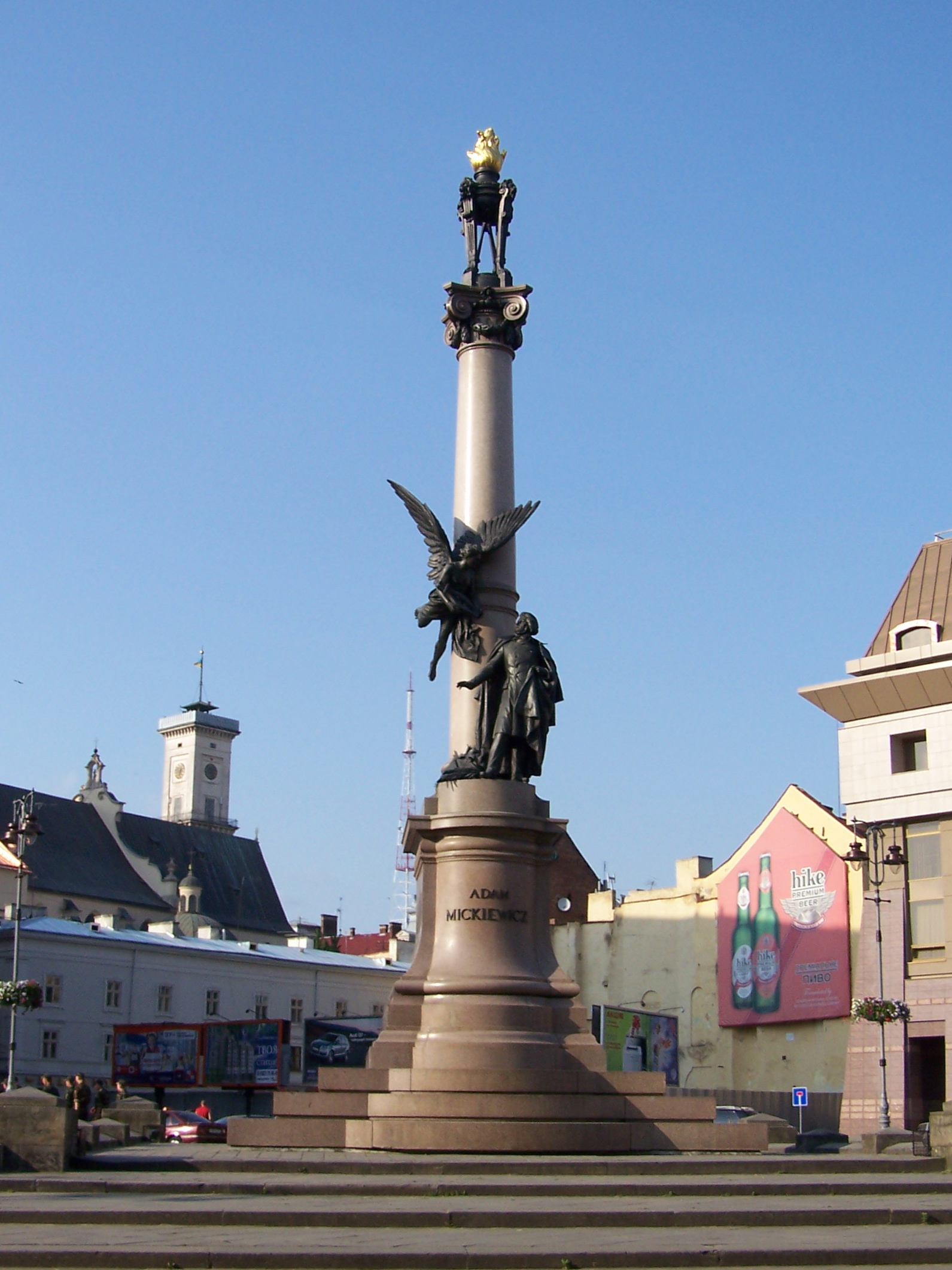
Adam Mickiewicz Column, Lviv

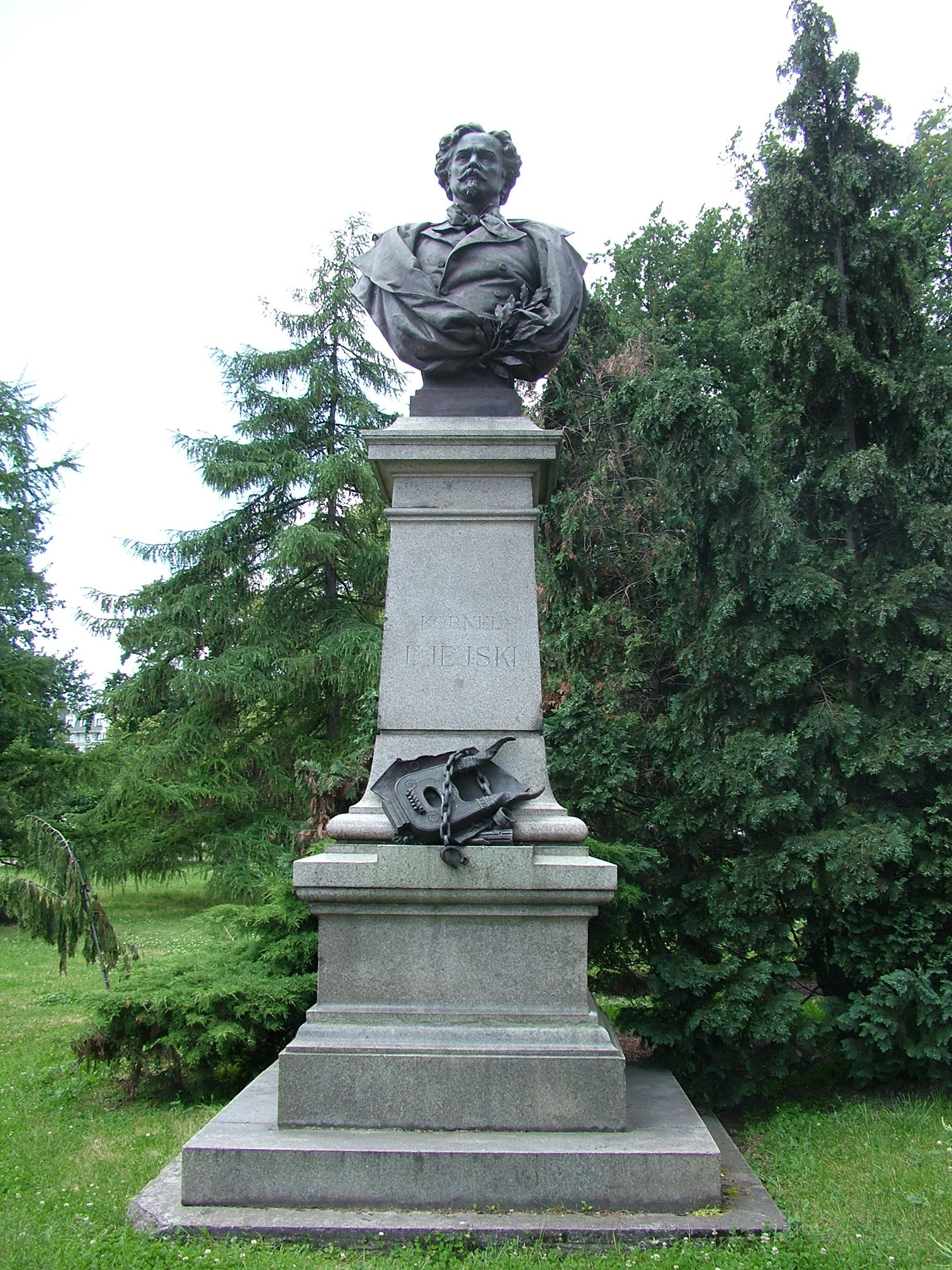
Kornel Ujejski Monument

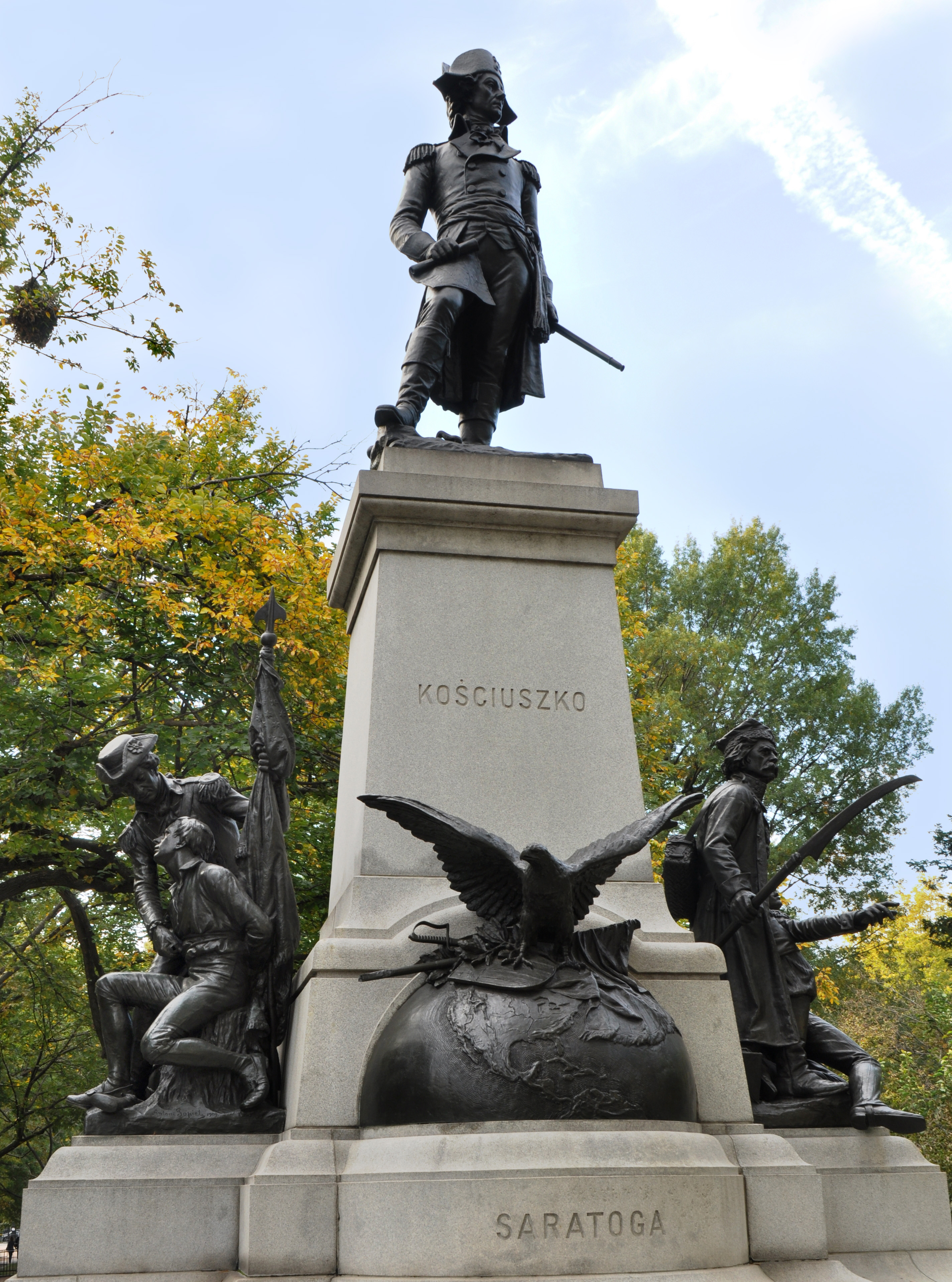
Brigadier General Thaddeus Kosciuszko, Washington, D.C.
