= Leonard Marconi =

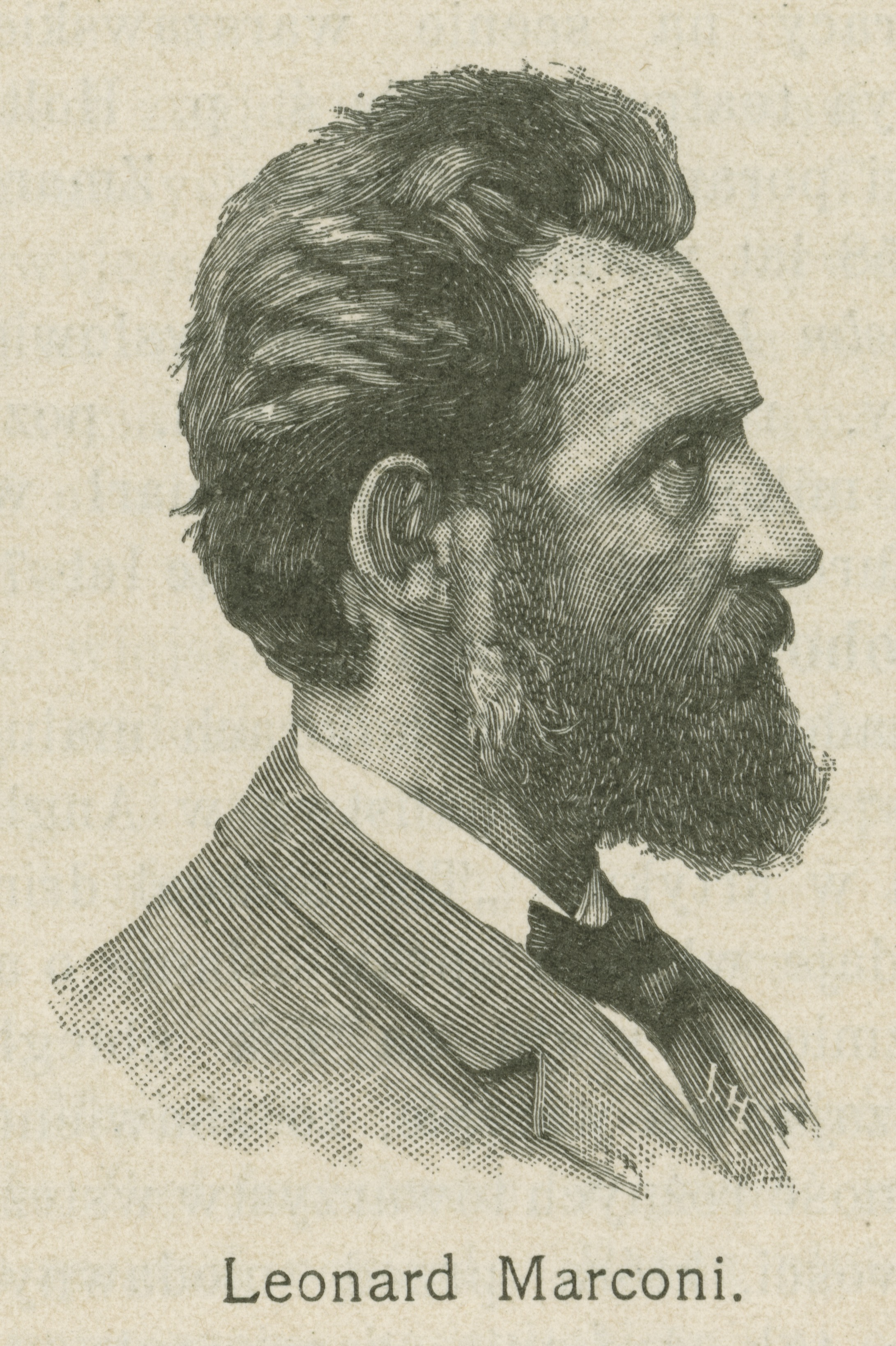
- Born: October 6, 1835; Warsaw, Congress Poland, Russian Empire
- Died: April 1, 1899 (aged 63); Lemberg, Galicia, Austria-Hungary
- Education: Academy of Fine Arts in Warsaw; Accademia di San Luca in Rome
- Known for: Architecture, sculpture
- Notable work: Façade of Galician Sejm; Tadeusz Kościuszko Monument in Kraków; Aleksander Fredro Monument in Wrocław

Leonard Marconi (Warsaw, 6 October 1835 – 1 April 1899, Lemberg) was a Polish architect and sculptor active in Warsaw and in Austrian Galicia, notably Lemberg (Lwów, now Lviv, Ukraine).

== Life ==
Leonard Marconi was born on 6 October 1835 in Warsaw to a well-known artistic family of Italian origin. He was the son of sculptor Ferrante Marconi, nephew of architect Henryk Marconi, and cousin of Leandro Marconi, a famed architect. He graduated from the Academy of Fine Arts in Warsaw, then the Accademia di San Luca in Rome.

In 1861, he returned to Poland and opened an atelier in Warsaw. Fairly successful as a sculptor, in 1873 he was invited to Lwów (then in Austro-Hungarian Galicia) to become a professor at the Technical Academy (Polish: Akademia Techniczna), predecessor of the Lviv Polytechnic.

He died in Lviv on 1 April 1899 and is interred at Lychakiv Cemetery.

== Gallery ==
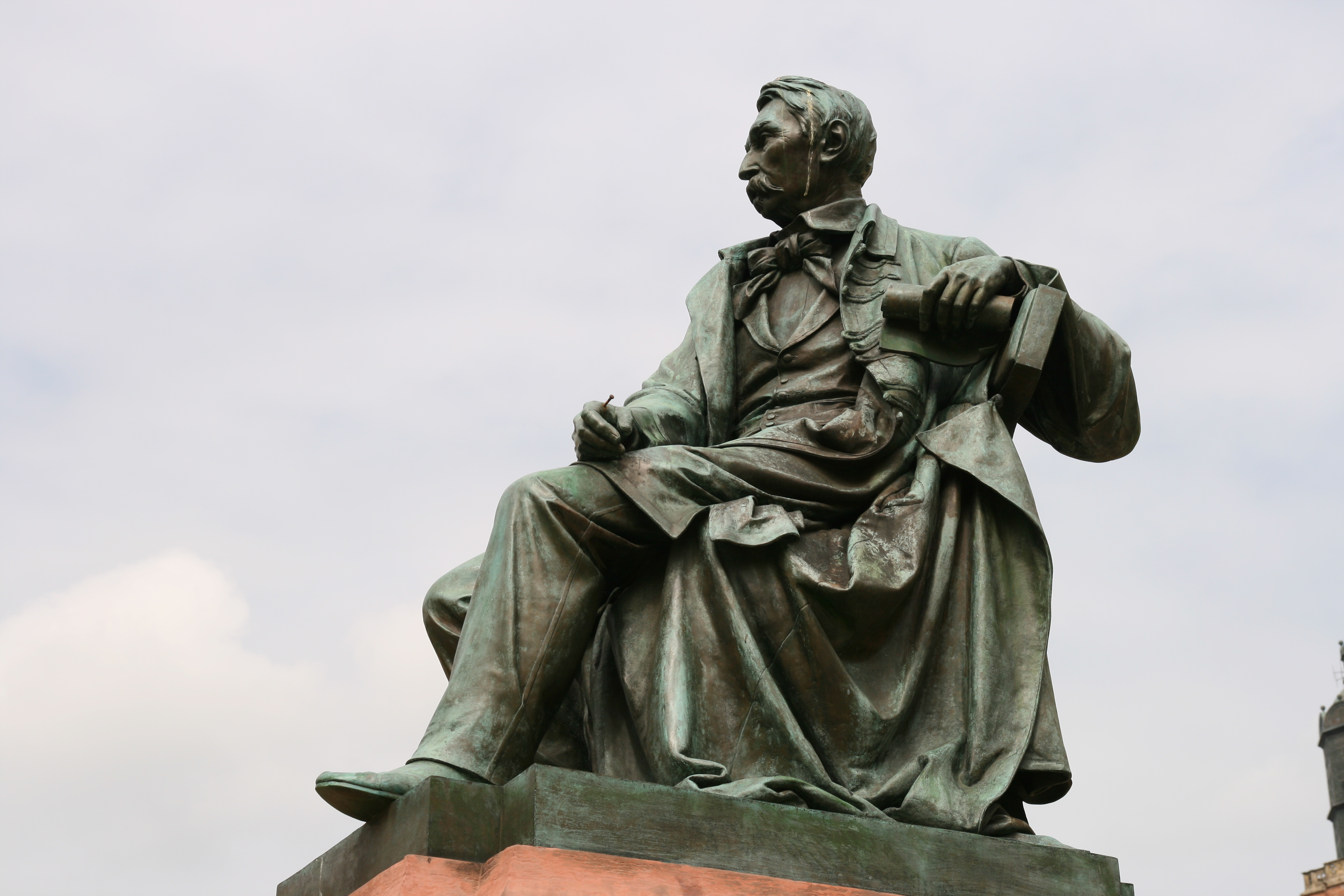
Aleksander Fredro Monument, originally built in Lwów, moved in 1956 to Wrocław

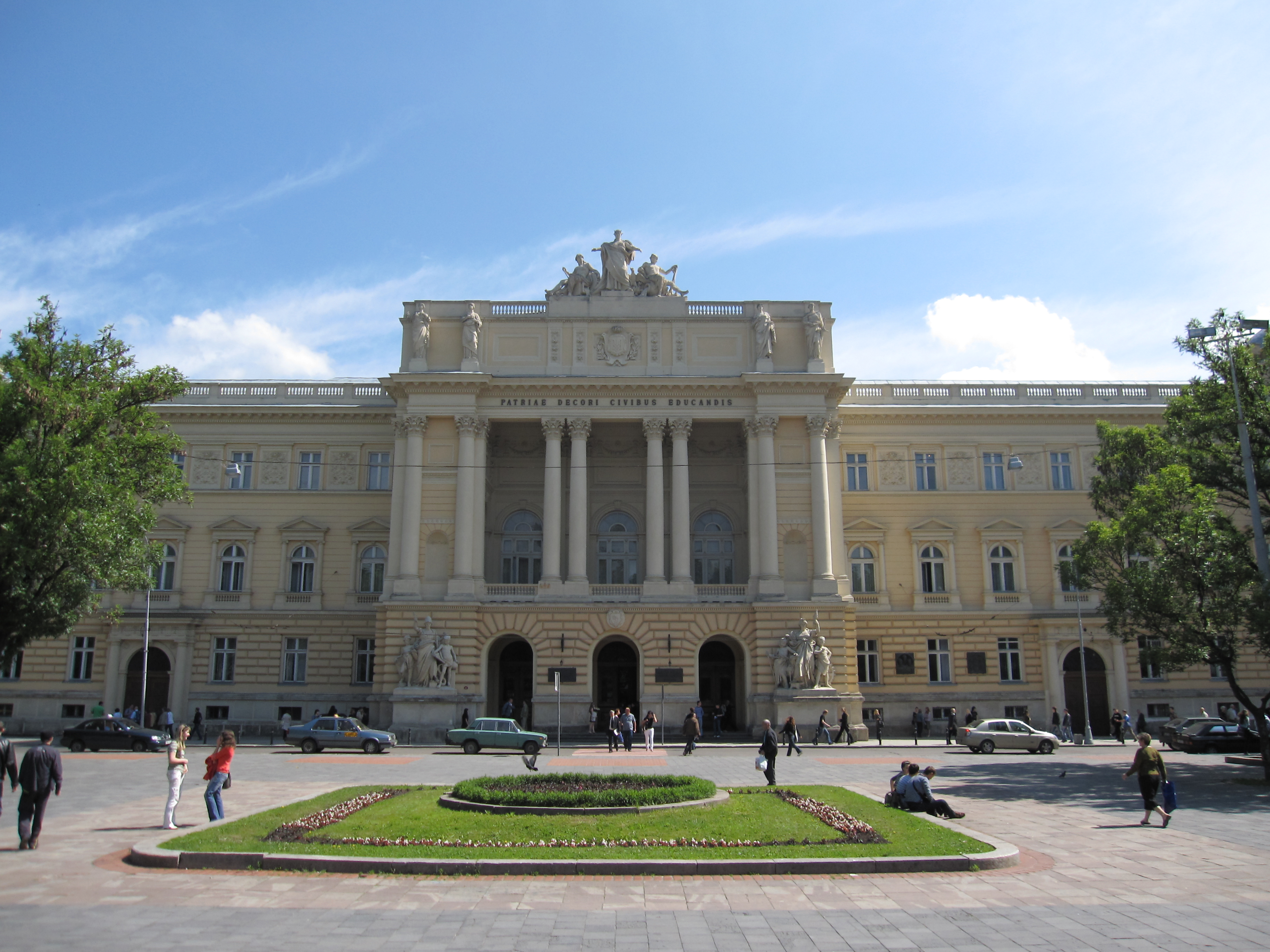
Façade of Galician Sejm; now seat of Lviv University. Marconi also decorated the interior.

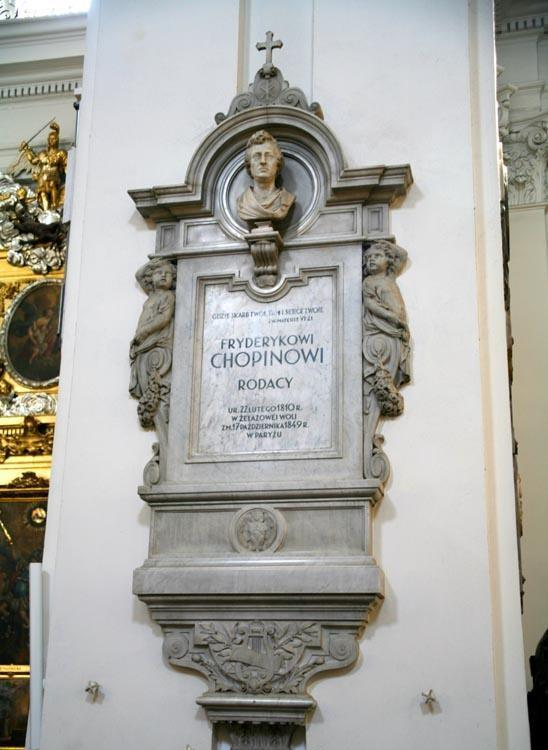
Frédéric Chopin's epitaph in Warsaw's Holy Cross Church, where his heart reposes

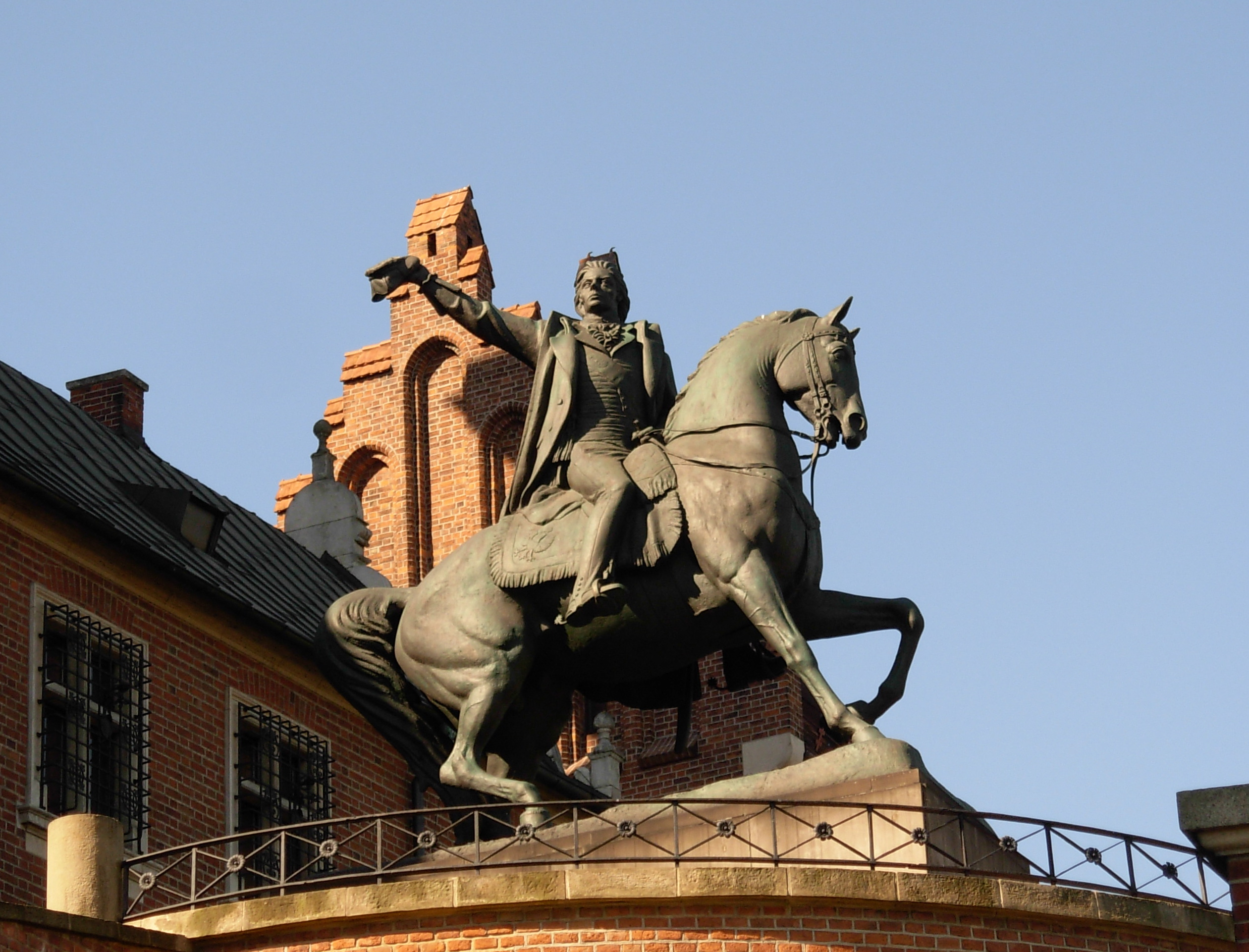
Tadeusz Kościuszko Monument on Kraków's Wawel Hill

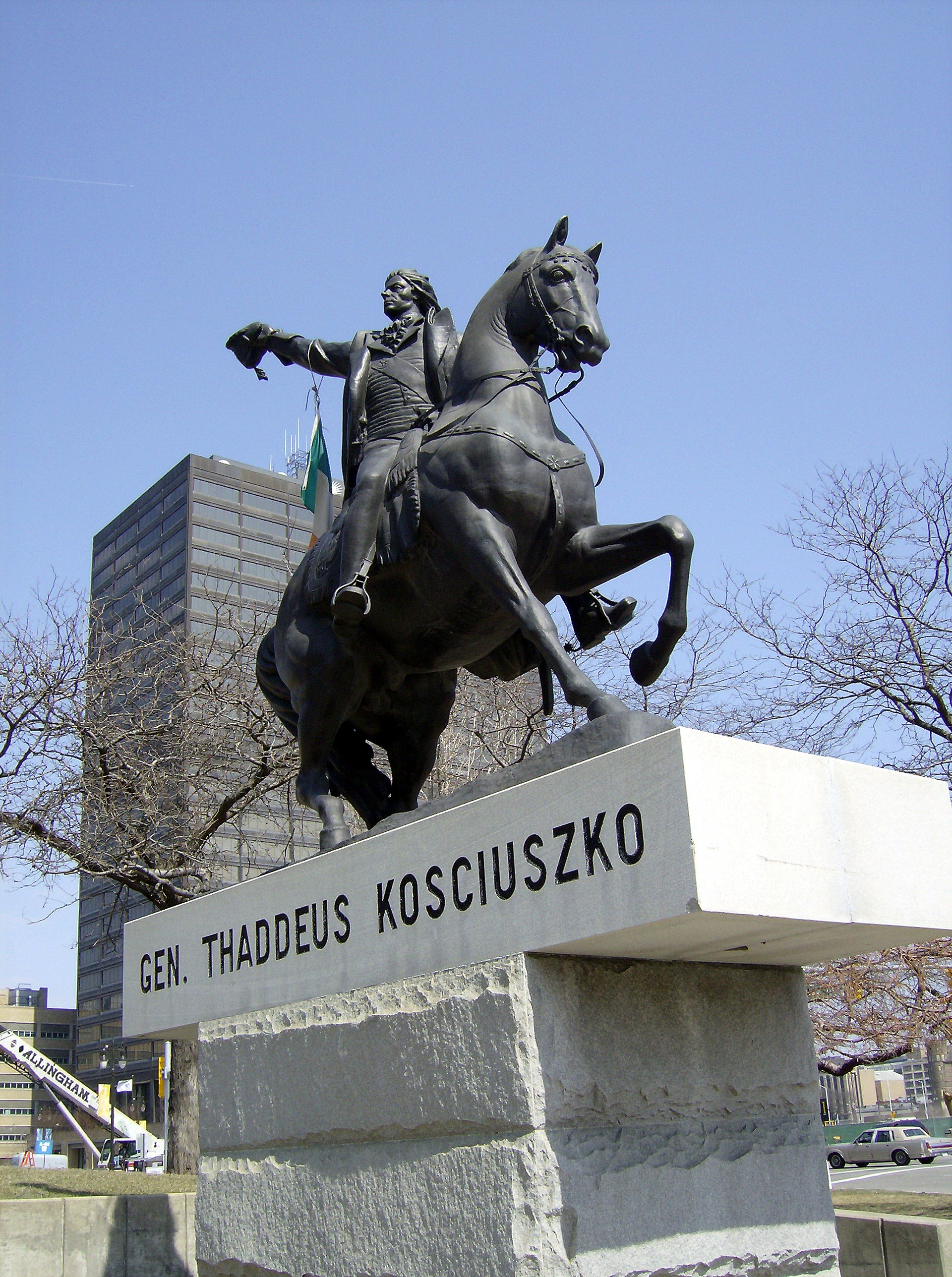
Copy of Marconi's Kraków monument to Kościuszko, in Detroit, Michigan

== See also ==
- Enrico Marconi
