= Lviv during the Middle Ages =

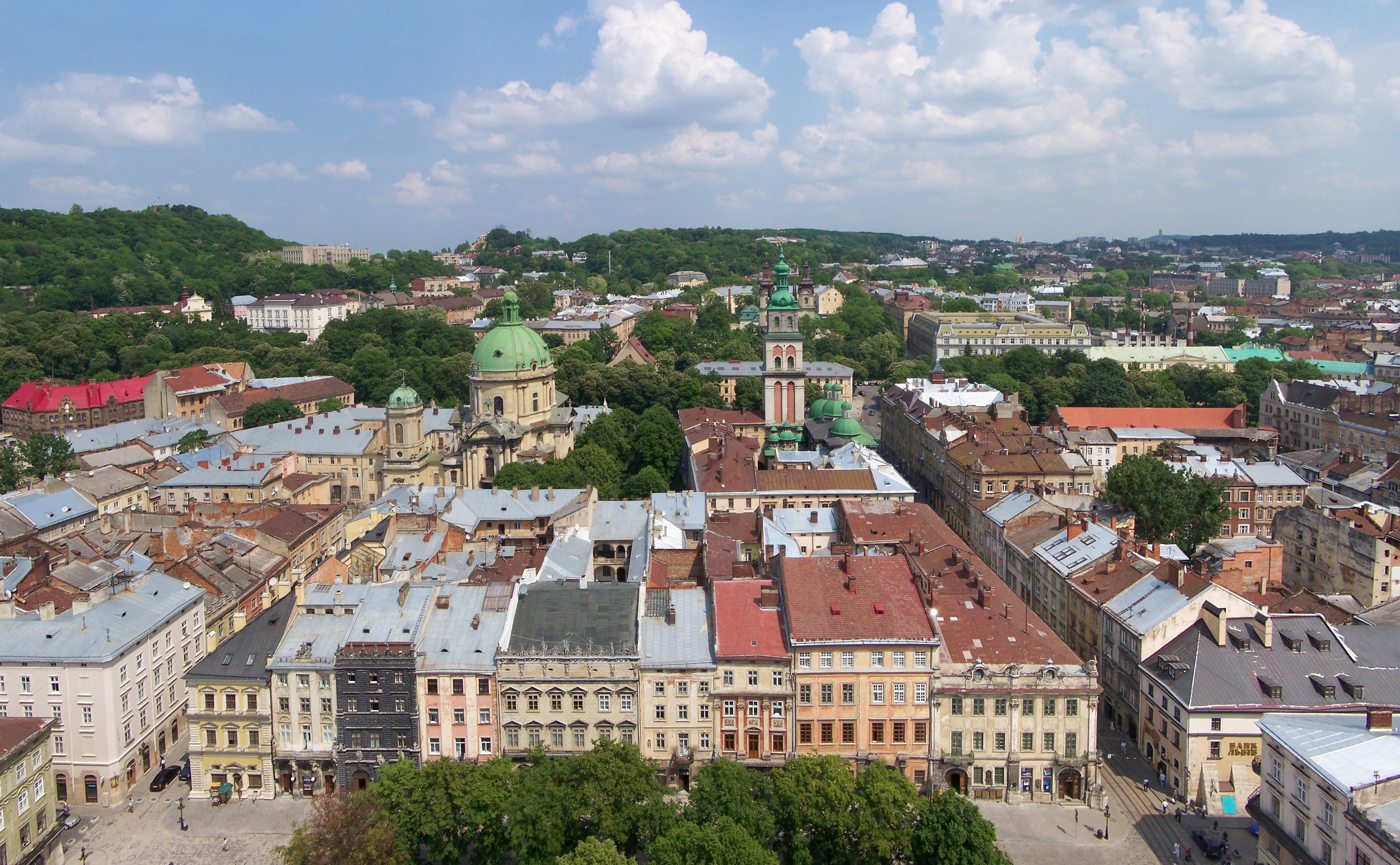
View to the old Lviv

In the Middle Ages, Lviv was an important economic, cultural and political center of Ruthenia. Its history covers the period from the foundation of the fortress in the mid-13th century to the second half of the 16th century, when the Polish–Lithuanian Commonwealth was formed and the Jagiellonian dynasty was interrupted. The first written mention of Lviv dates back to 1256. From the 2nd half of the 13th century it was one of the largest cities of the Kingdom of Galicia–Volhynia, after 1341 — the center of the "Ruthenian Kingdom" within Poland. In 1370, Lviv was ceded to the Kingdom of Hungary, and in 1387, it returned to the Kingdom of Poland. After 1433, Lviv became the administrative center of the Ruthenian Voivodeship. The population of the medieval city was characterized by multi-ethnicity and multi-confessionalism, which often led to friction and open conflict between different communities.

== History ==
According to archaeological excavations, the territory of modern Lviv and its immediate surroundings was inhabited as early as the Mesolithic period. In particular, several ancient settlements, including a cave settlement, as well as stone products of the Vorotsev-Starunya culture (6th–4th millennium BC) were found on the territory of modern Bryukhovichi. From the end of the Copper Age (3rd millennium B.C.), traces of settlements of agricultural and pastoral tribes were discovered by archaeologists on Zamkova Hora, as well as on the hills of Lysovka, Zhupan and Chortovi Skeli near the town of Vynnyky (these settlements are attributed to the funnelbeaker culture). On the territory of the modern Ivan Franko Park there is a burial mound from the beginning of the Bronze Age.

In 1992, during excavations in the area of today's Dobrobut Market (former suburb of Kraków, today's Knyaz Jarosław Osmomysła Square), traces of settlements of the Hallstatt culture (mid 1st millennium BC), Chernyakhov culture (4th century), Prague culture (6th century) and Luka-Raikovetska culture (8th–9th century) were discovered. Traces of a Hallstatt settlement were found in Teatralna Street in 1986 and in Ivan Pidkova Square in 1987.

The oldest permanent Slavic settlements on the Lviv's modern territory of were located between the Poltva River valley and the Znesinnia Hills. In the territory of today's Znesinnia Park, namely on the top of Snake Mountain, in the 7th–10th centuries there was a pagan temple of the god Svetovit, near which there was a large hillfort (today this area is known as Svyatovitov's Field). On the neighboring Baba Mountain (also known as the Rod Mountain), traces of a temple and a settlement from the same period were discovered. It has been established that in the 10th century these settlements moved to the western slope of Zamkova Mountain and most of the old settlement was demolished. After that, the area was given the name Znesinnia, which is the oldest Lviv toponym of Slavic origin.

Znesinnia Hills

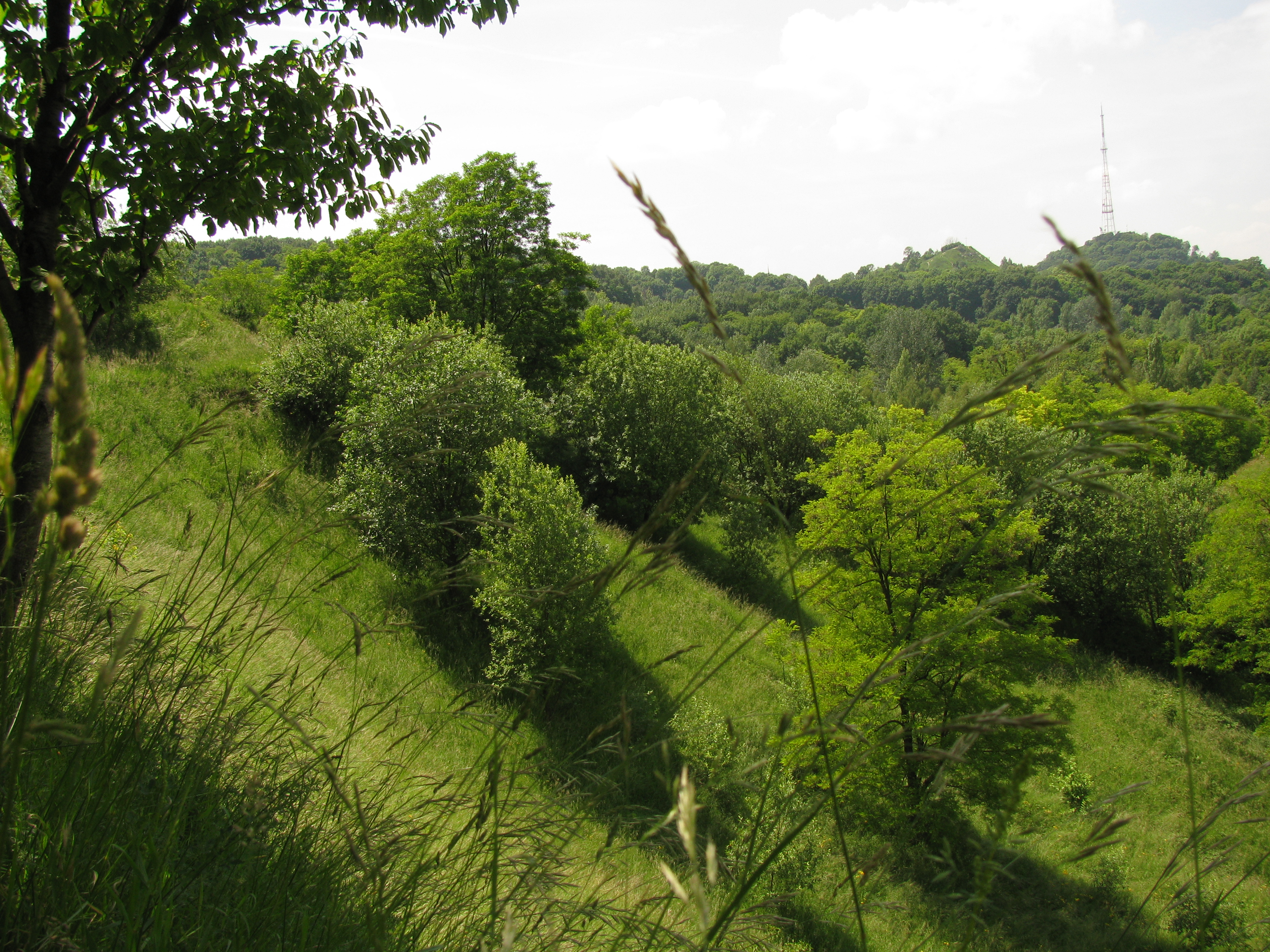

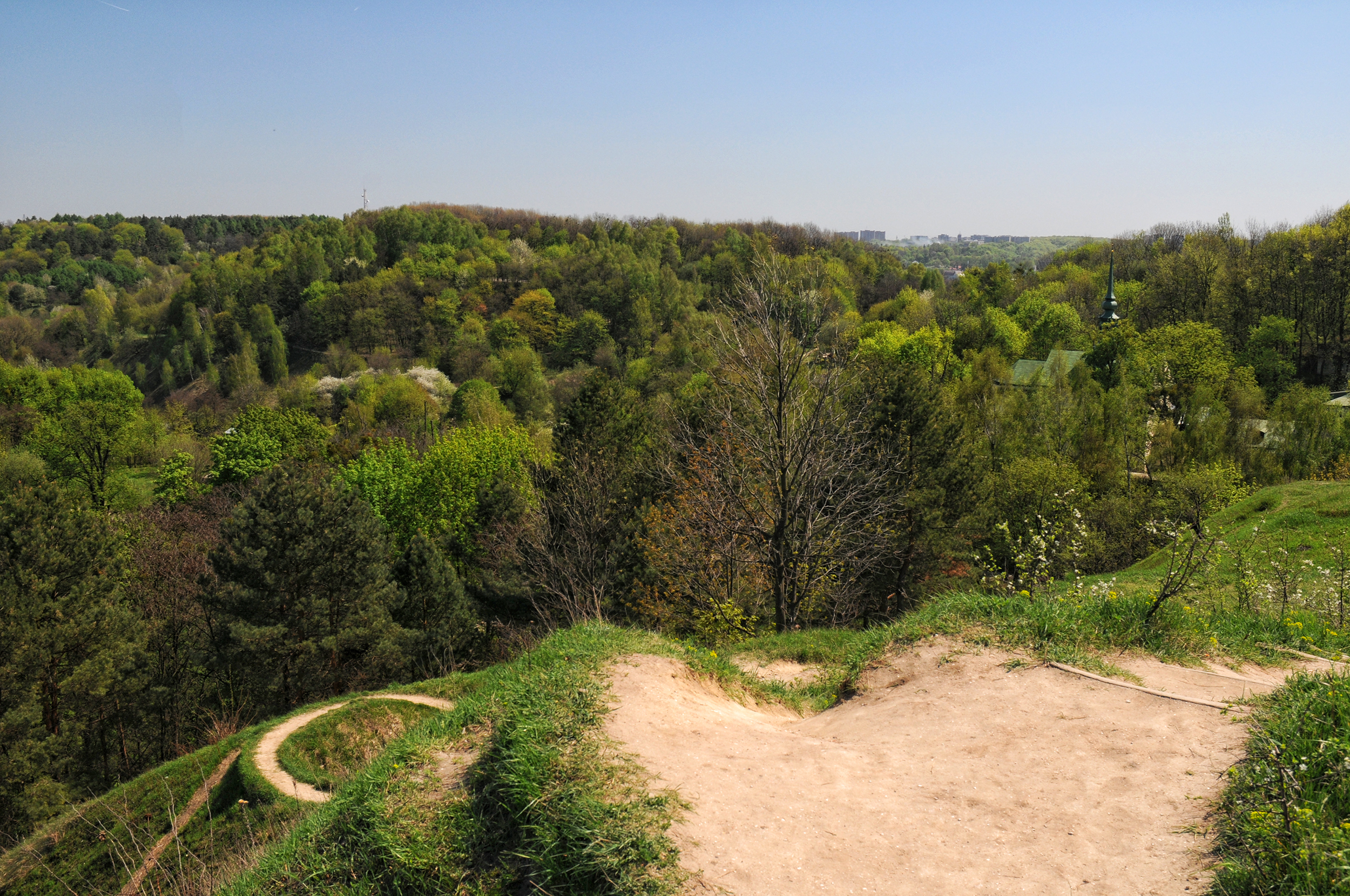

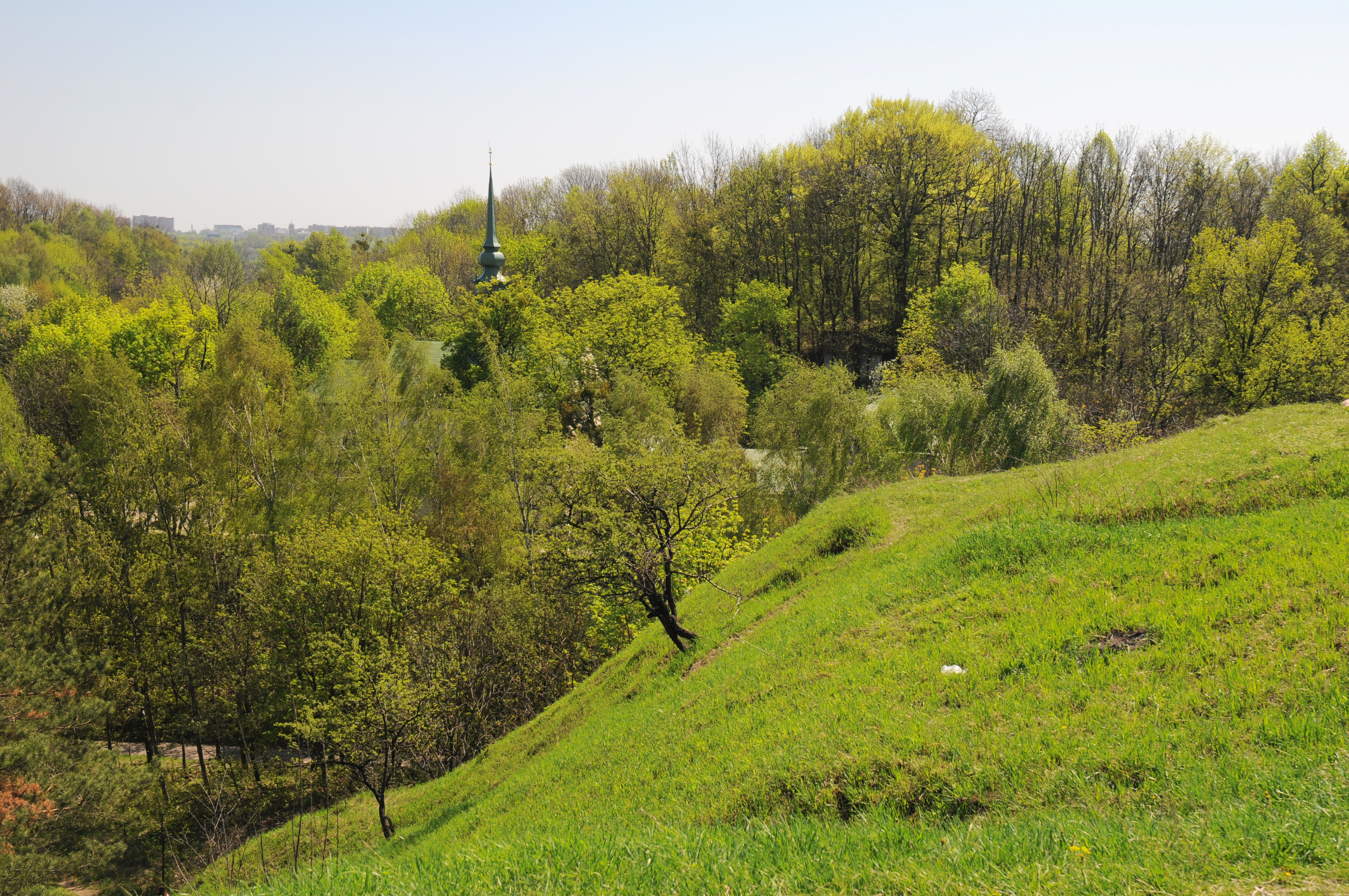

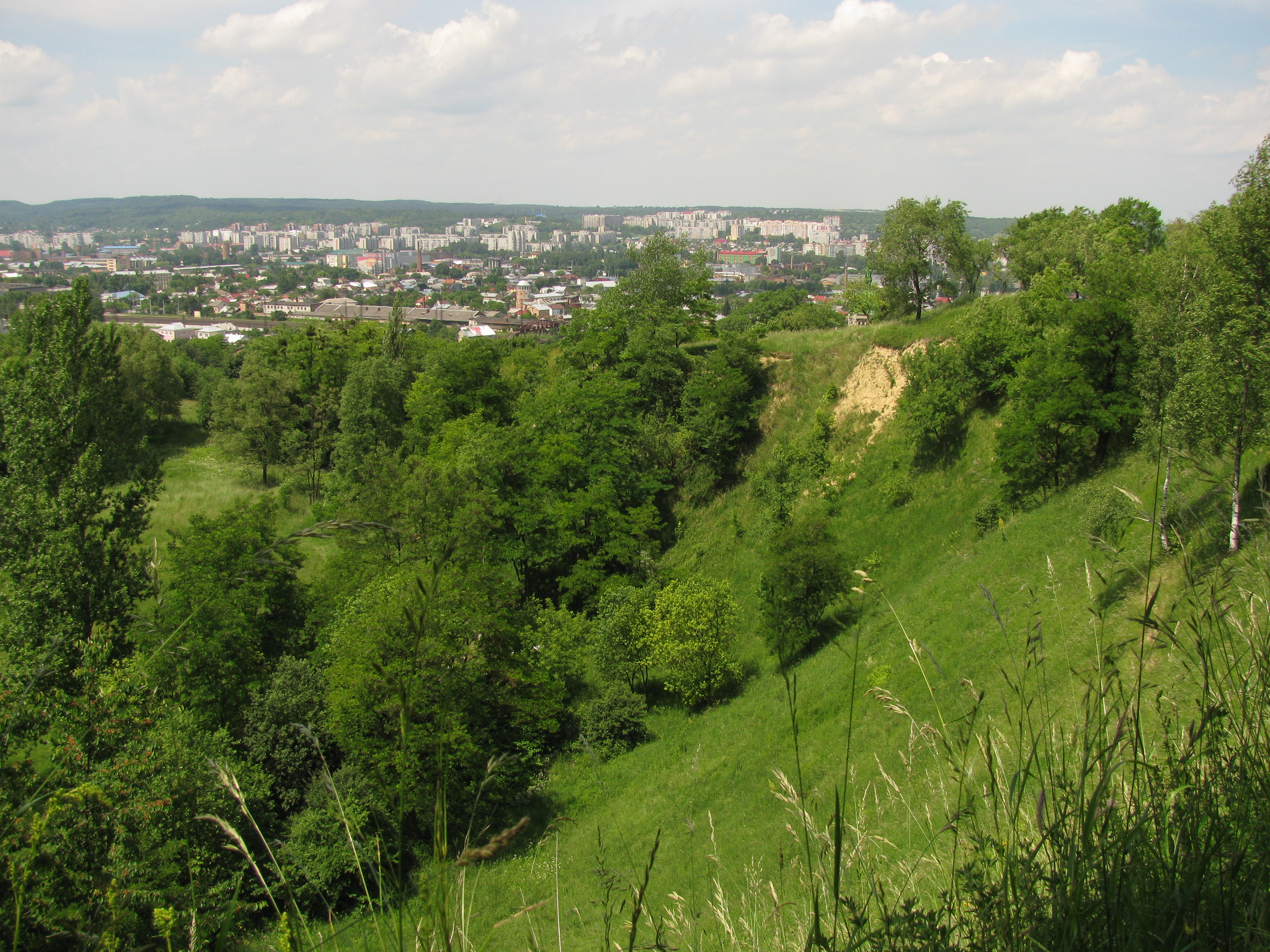

Traces of another ancient settlement, apparently from the 11th century, were found in the Ivan Franko Park. Additionally, in Lviv and the nearest suburbs there are numerous traces of the temples of Perun, Rod, Rozhanitsy and Veles. Writing developed in the area of modern Lviv, as evidenced by birch-bark letters found in 1988–1989 in Zvenyhorod and dated to the first third of the 12th century (these are the only birch-bark letters found in Ukraine).

=== Kingdom of Galicia–Volhynia ===
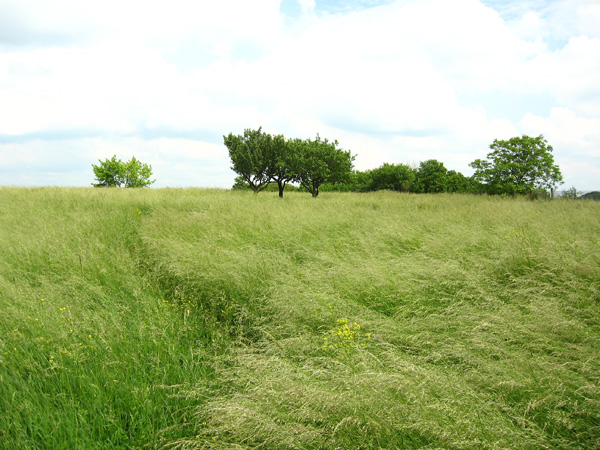
Top of Baba Mount (Rod)

Lviv was first mentioned in the Galician–Volhynia Chronicle in connection with a fire in Chełm in fall of 1256. The founder of the city is considered to be Prince Daniel Romanovich, who named it after his son Leo. However, contemporary sources do not confirm this. Leontii wójtovich, for example, considers Lev Danilovich to be the founder, which is supported by the data of the annals of the 16th-18th centuries. In 1245, Leo commanded a separate regiment, which indicates the existence of an appanage.

1980s restoration work, revealed the remains of oak buildings dating from 1213. The city may have been founded after the Mongol raid 1239 to rebuild the economy, or in honor of Leo's marriage to Constance, daughter of Bela IV (1247).

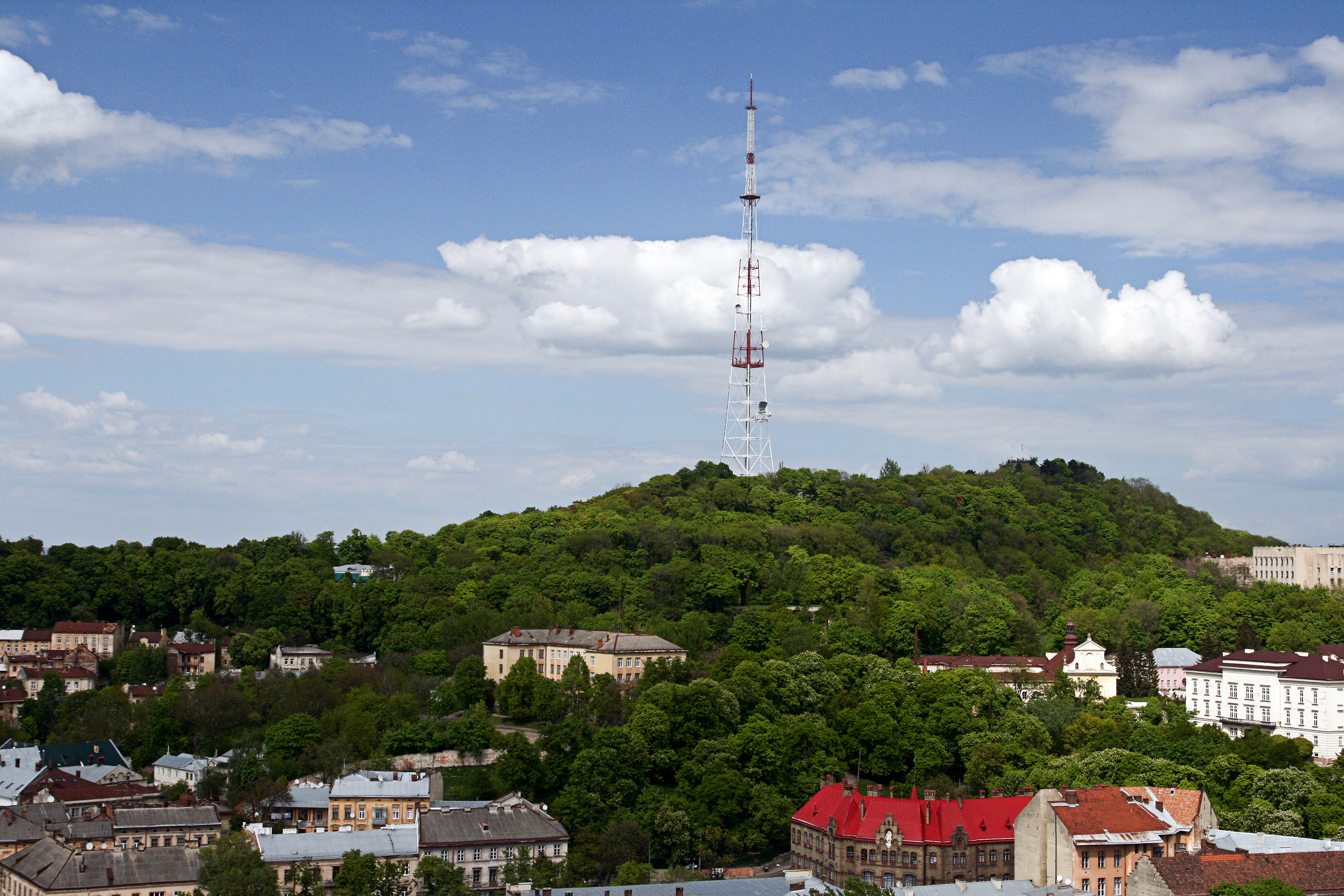
Castle Hill

In 1259 or 1261, the Mongol general Boroldai forced the destruction of the wooden Lviv castle on Zamkova Hill. According to the version of researchers, the Detinets was located either on the Zamkova Hill or in the place of Znesinnia. In 1270–1280, Lviv became the capital of the Princedom, the city's coat of arms was used as the state symbol. In 1288, the castle withstood the siege of Telebuga Khan. Archaeologists discovered the remains of a round tower, a stone wall and an earthen rampart.

In the 13th–14th centuries, Lviv was a major city of the principality and had a coat of arms with the image of a lion. The princes' palace was located on the site of today's Dominican monastery. In 1340, Prince Yuri II was poisoned, causing unrest. The Polish king Casimir III took advantage of this and seized Lviv, but the city was repulsed by the Tatars and citizens led by Dmytro Dedko. In 1349, Casimir retook Lviv and made it the center of the "Ruthenian Kingdom". In the 14th century, Lviv became the economic center of the principality, but not an important political or cultural center. Due to German colonization, a significant group of burghers was formed here, governed by city law.

=== Polish kingdom ===
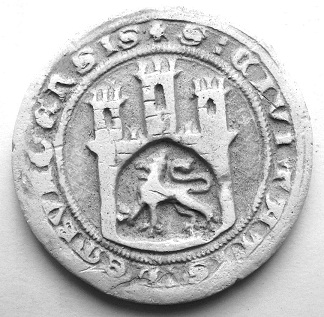
Seal with the coat of arms of Lviv, 1359

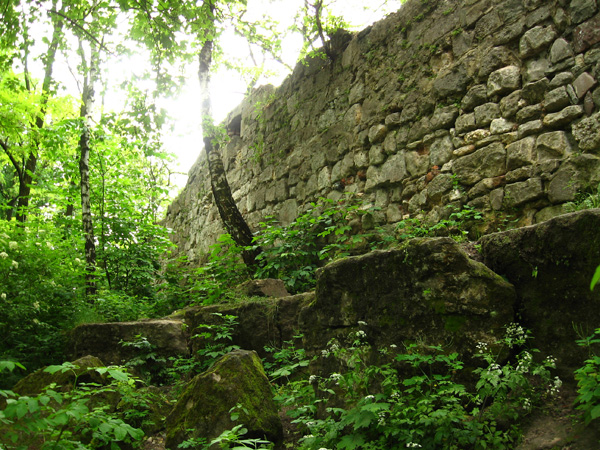
Fragment of the Polish wall on the High Castle

In the summer of 1352, Casimir III granted large estates to the children of the Lviv wójt Berthold, and also confirmed the rights of the Galician boyars and obliged them to military service. Wojts and schultheisses were also obliged to military service. On his order, the High Castle was rebuilt: stone walls, towers, two courtyards and a palace appeared.

In 1356, Lviv became self-governated under the Magdeburg rights. (Note: Elements of Magdeburg law, such as the position of a voyt, were also present in the princely period. It is therefore believed that the royal charter of 1356 confirmed the status quo rather than introducing Magdeburg law from scratch.) After the Casimir III's death in 1370, the city went to Hungary. Vladyslaus Opolczyk gave the Armenians the Church of the Holy Cross and allocated funds for monasteries. In 1381, a fire destroyed the town hall, the lower castle and the archive.

In 1387, Jadwiga returned Lviv to Poland. Vladyslaus II promised not to give the city to the feudal lords. The Polish authorities granted privileges to Catholics, to the detriment of Ruthenians and Jews. By the end of the 14th century, Polish and German settlers had become a wealthy patriciate. Vladyslaus II granted Armenians the right to trade in Poland in 1402.

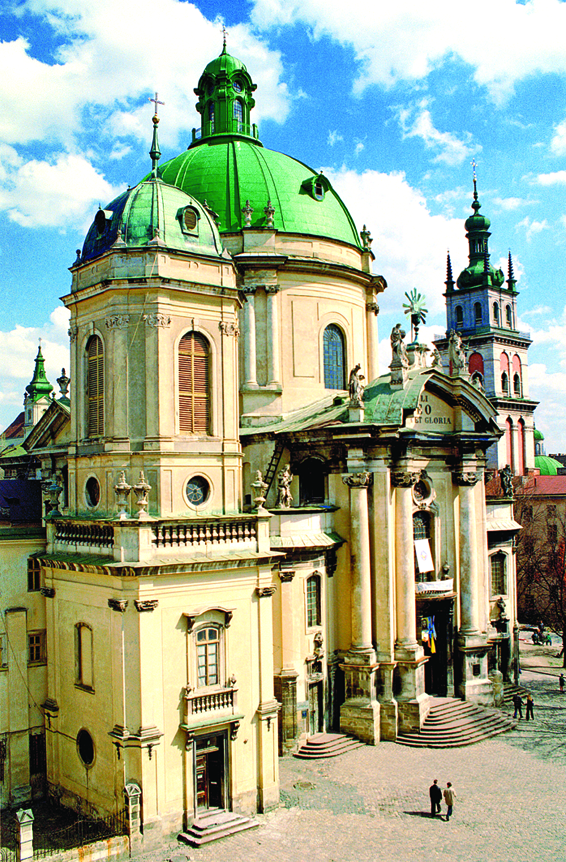
The Dominican monastery church

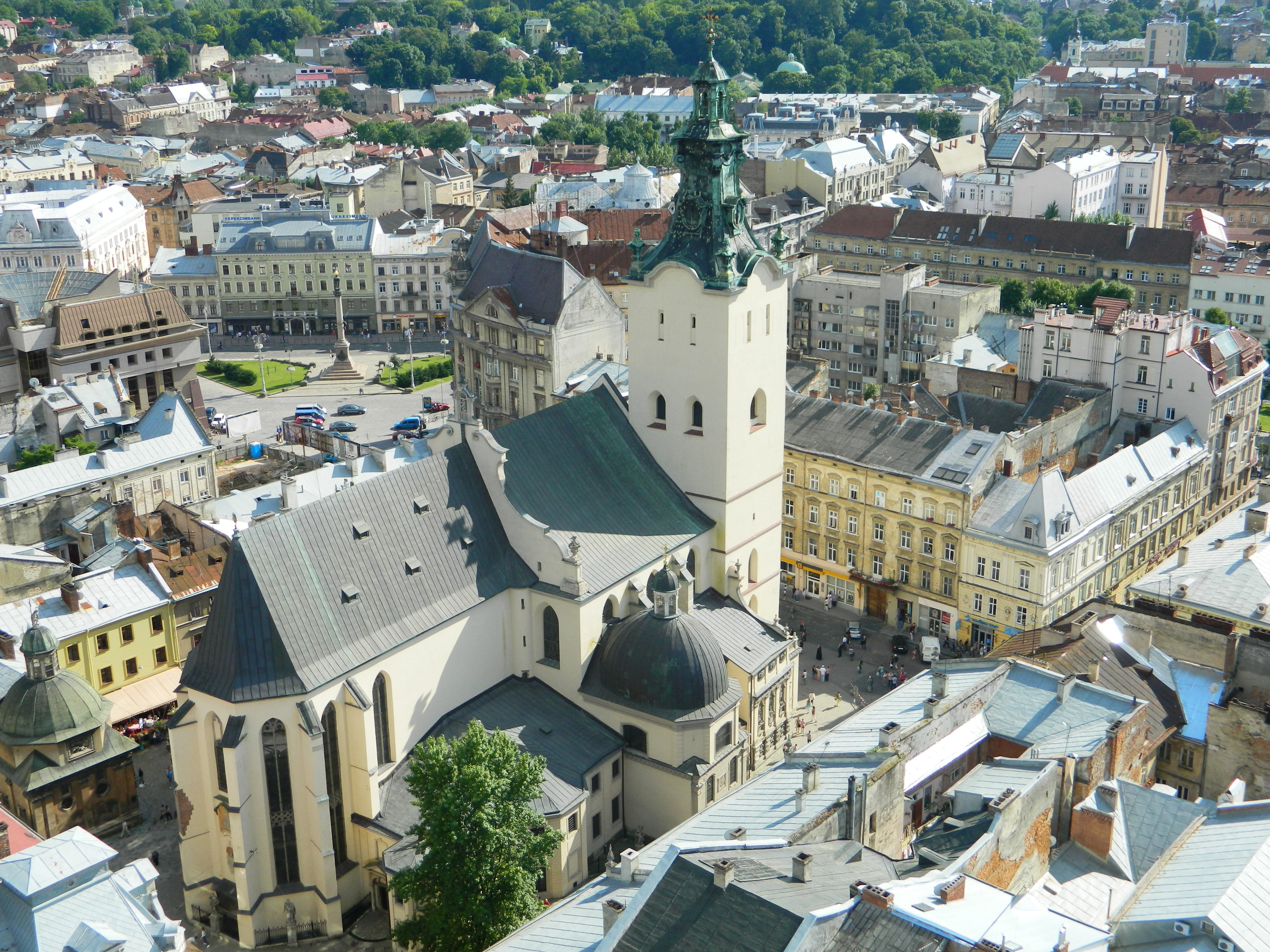
Latin Cathedral

In 1410, in Lviv Vladyslaus II developed the plan of a campaign against the Teutonic Order. After the battle of Grunwald (1410) the city met him triumphantly. In 1415, the king granted Lviv lands for the foundation of villages. In 1434, Galicia became part of Poland, becoming the Ruthenian Voivodeship. Polonization and ocatholization accelerated.

In 1489, Polish troops passed through Lviv on their way to Wallachia. The fires of 1494, 1498, and 1524, caused considerable damage to the city. In 1509, the Moldavian lord Bogdan III besieged Lviv, but Polish troops defeated his army.

In 1527, a fire destroyed the city's Gothic architecture, forcing a major reconstruction. In 1539, an Orthodox archbishopric was established in Lviv. In the 16th century, the suburbs and urban villages grew, mainly due to the influx of craftsmen.

In 1559, a conflict broke out in the city over Princess Elzaveta Ostrogska. In 1578, Ivan Pidkova, a pretender to the Moldavian throne, was executed. In 1586, Patriarch Joachim V blessed the charter of the Brotherhood of the Holy Night. At the end of the 16th century, Lviv became an important cultural and religious center.

== Urban development and planning ==
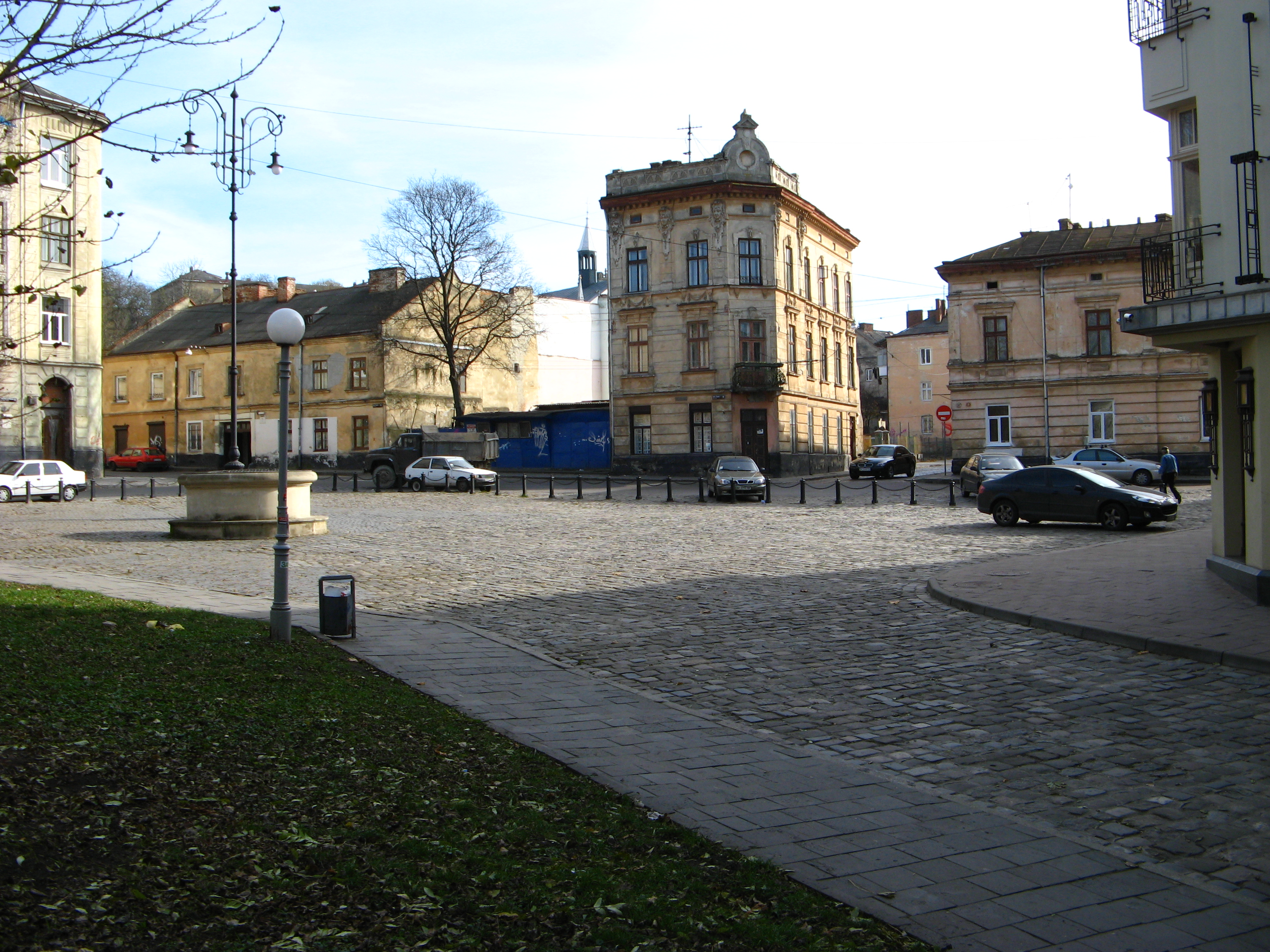
Old Market Square

In the Middle Ages, Lviv consisted of two castles: the High Castle on the Zamkova Hill and the Low Castle in the Poltva River valley, where Vicheva Square is located nowadays. The city was surrounded by fortress walls with gates and towers. To the northeast, Lviv was bordered by the village of Zneseniye, and to the west and south by the Poltva and Paseka rivers. The city center (roundabout) was located on the western slope of Zamkova Hill, from Old Market Square to Pidzamche. There were about ten Orthodox churches among the dense buildings. The city was bordered by suburbs (posady).

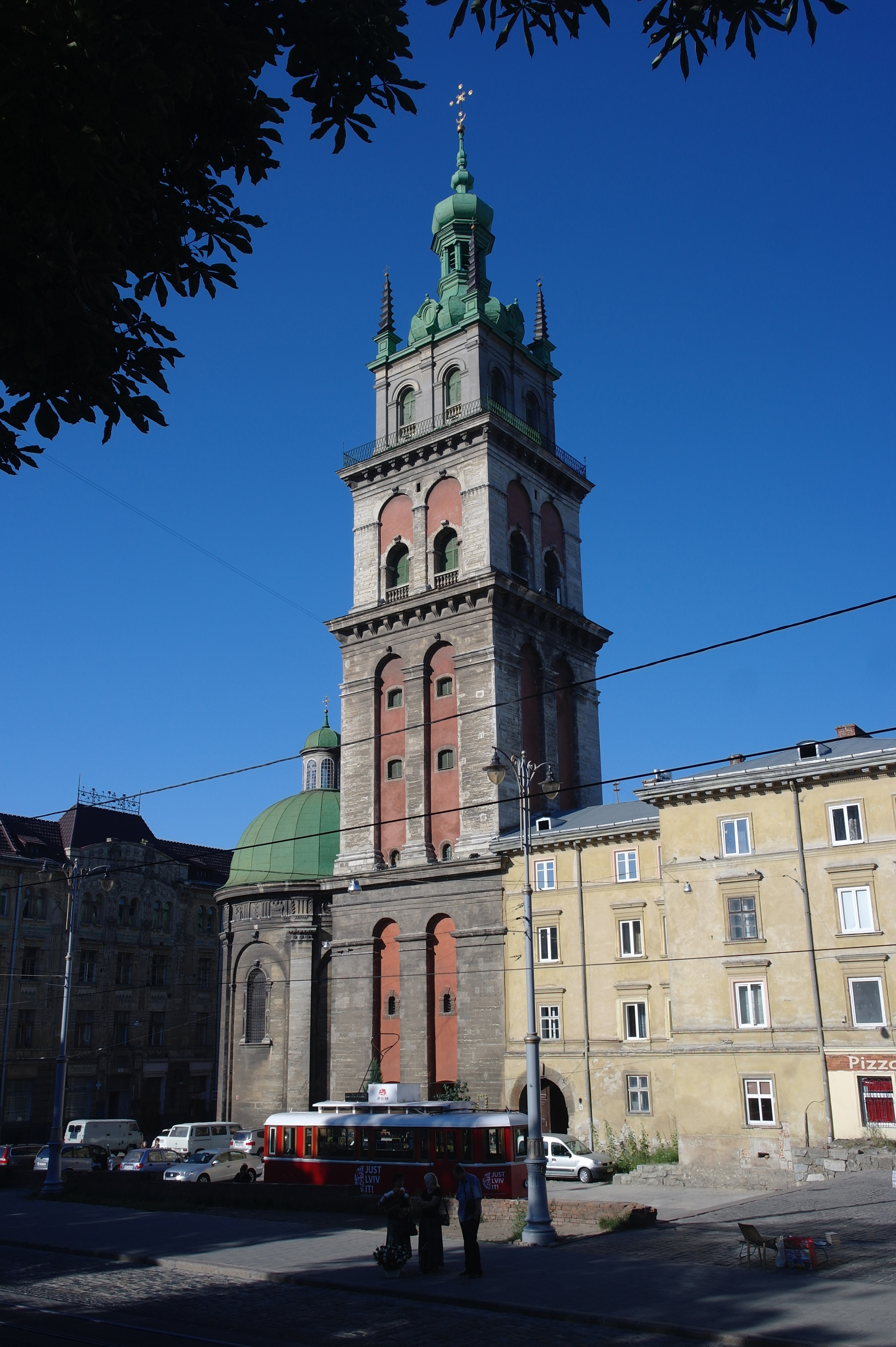
Korniakt Tower

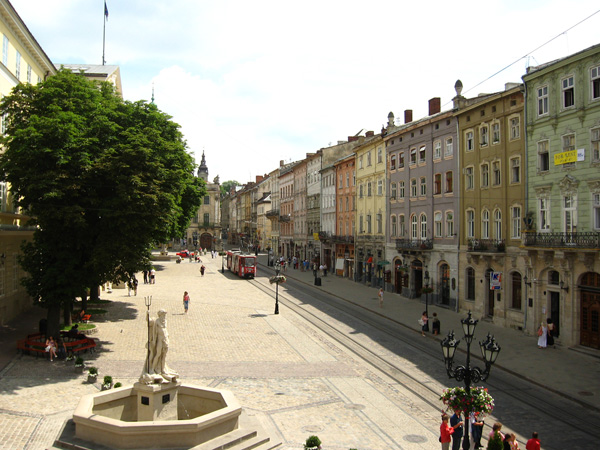
Market Square

In the late 14th and early 15th centuries, the new city center, inhabited by German burghers and Catholic nobility, was surrounded by a stone wall with towers, gates, and a moat with water. The modern boundaries of the medieval center include Svobody Avenue, Mickiewicz Square, Halytska Square, Soborna Square, Vynnychenka Street, and Mytna Square. In the center was the Market Square with the City Hall, and Ruthenians, Armenians, and Jews lived in separate quarters. The former city center gradually fell into disrepair and became the Zhovkva suburb. To the west and south of the center were the Krakiv and Galicia suburbs, and to the east — the Lychakiv suburb.

Zneseniye was owned by Polish kings who leased it. In 1356, Casimir III granted Lviv 70 Frankish lans, and in 1368, he increased the territory by 30 lans. By the end of the 14th century, the city had expanded considerably due to settlers from Western Europe and neighboring countries.

The fortifications of the city included two main gates: the Galician Gate and the Krakow Gate. The Galician Gate, located at the intersection of today's Halytska and Brativ Rohatyntsiv Streets, protected the entrance to the city from Galicia and Hungary. The Krakow Gate, located at the intersection of Krakowska and Lesya Ukrainka Streets, controlled the entrances from Krakow and Lutsk. The city's defensive walls consisted of the High Wall, completed in the first half of the 15th century, and the Low Wall with bastions.

After the fire of 1527, which destroyed many parts of the city, the authorities rebuilt the fortifications. New towers were built on the southern and eastern parts of the city walls. At that time, Lviv had three lines of defense: the High Wall with towers, the Low Wall with bastions, and the earthen ramparts, culminating in the construction of the Powder Tower. In the 16th century, additional bastions and fortifications were built.

The High Castle was rebuilt from stone in the 14th century and renovated in 1535–1538, 1574–1575 and 1586–1589. Inside the castle there was a palace, barracks and dungeons. The Low Castle was built in the 70s of the 13th century and rebuilt in the 14th century. In 1381, the Low Castle burned down and was rebuilt, but in 1565 it burned down again. Since then it has been rebuilt several times.

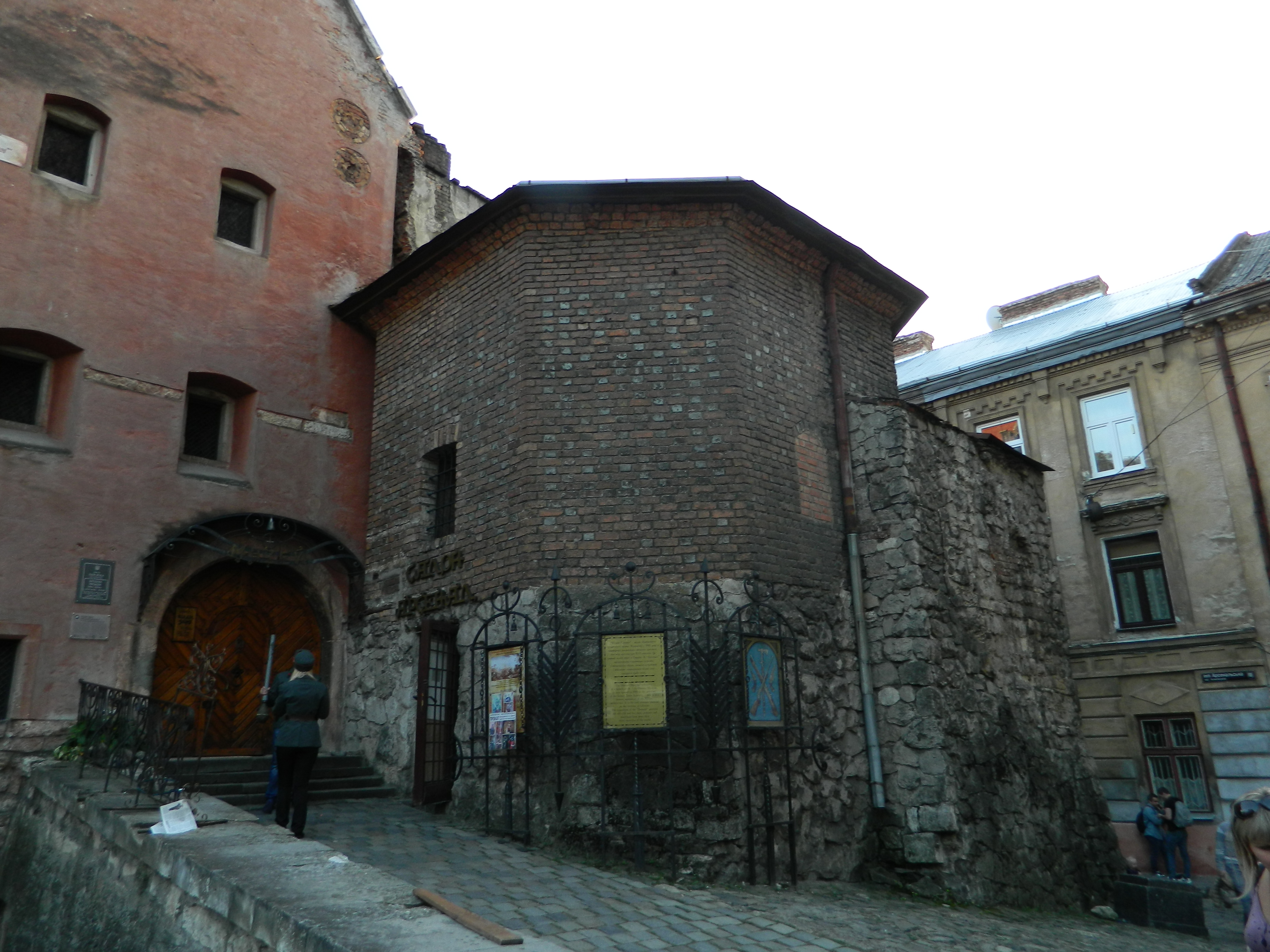
Fragment of the tower of the Stonemasons, Tesemakers and Lathes

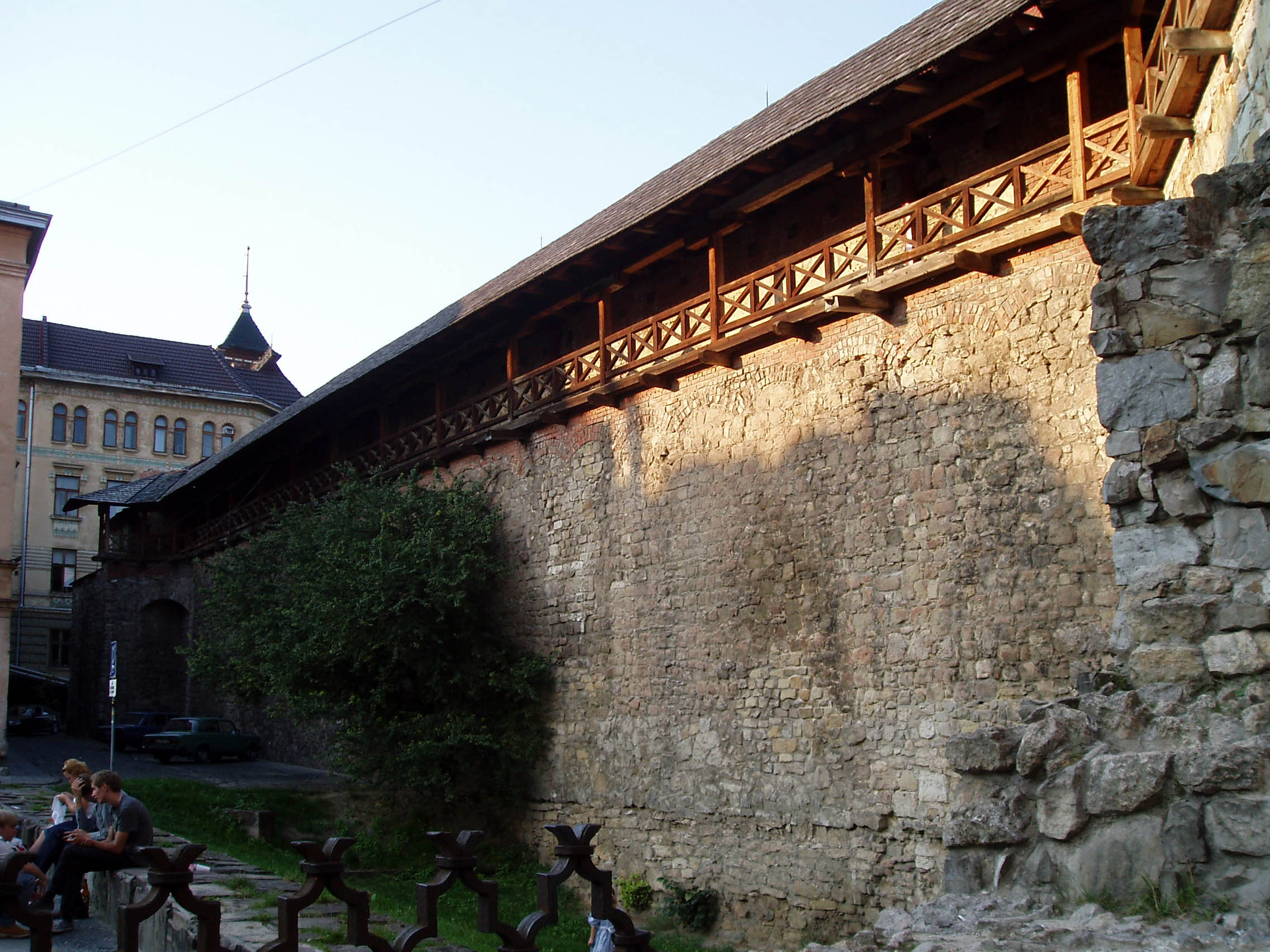
Fragment of the High Wall behind the arsenal

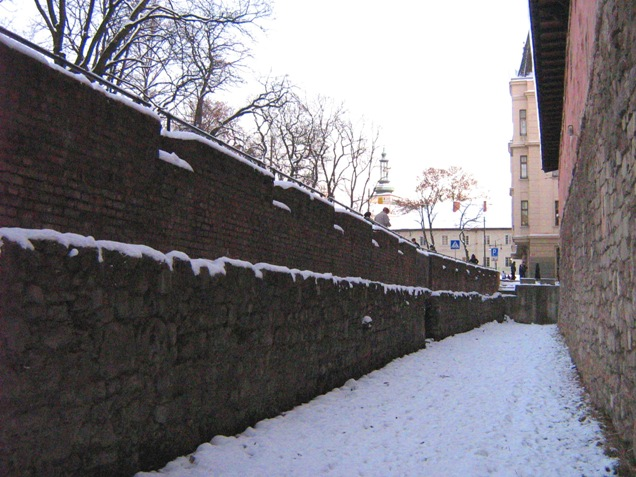
Fragment of the Low wall in front of the arsenal

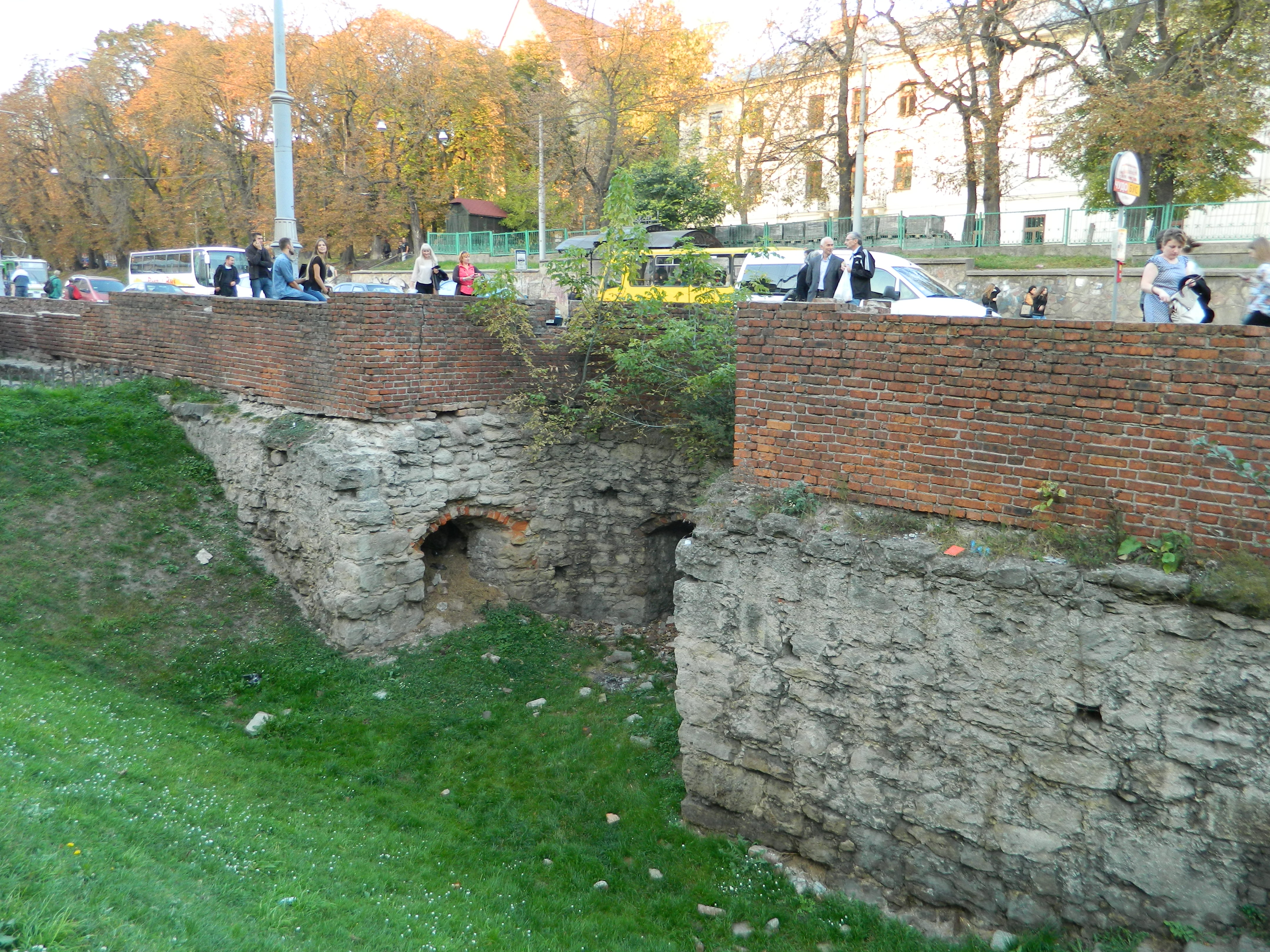
Fragment of the Low Wall Bastei on Pidvalna Street

== Architecture ==
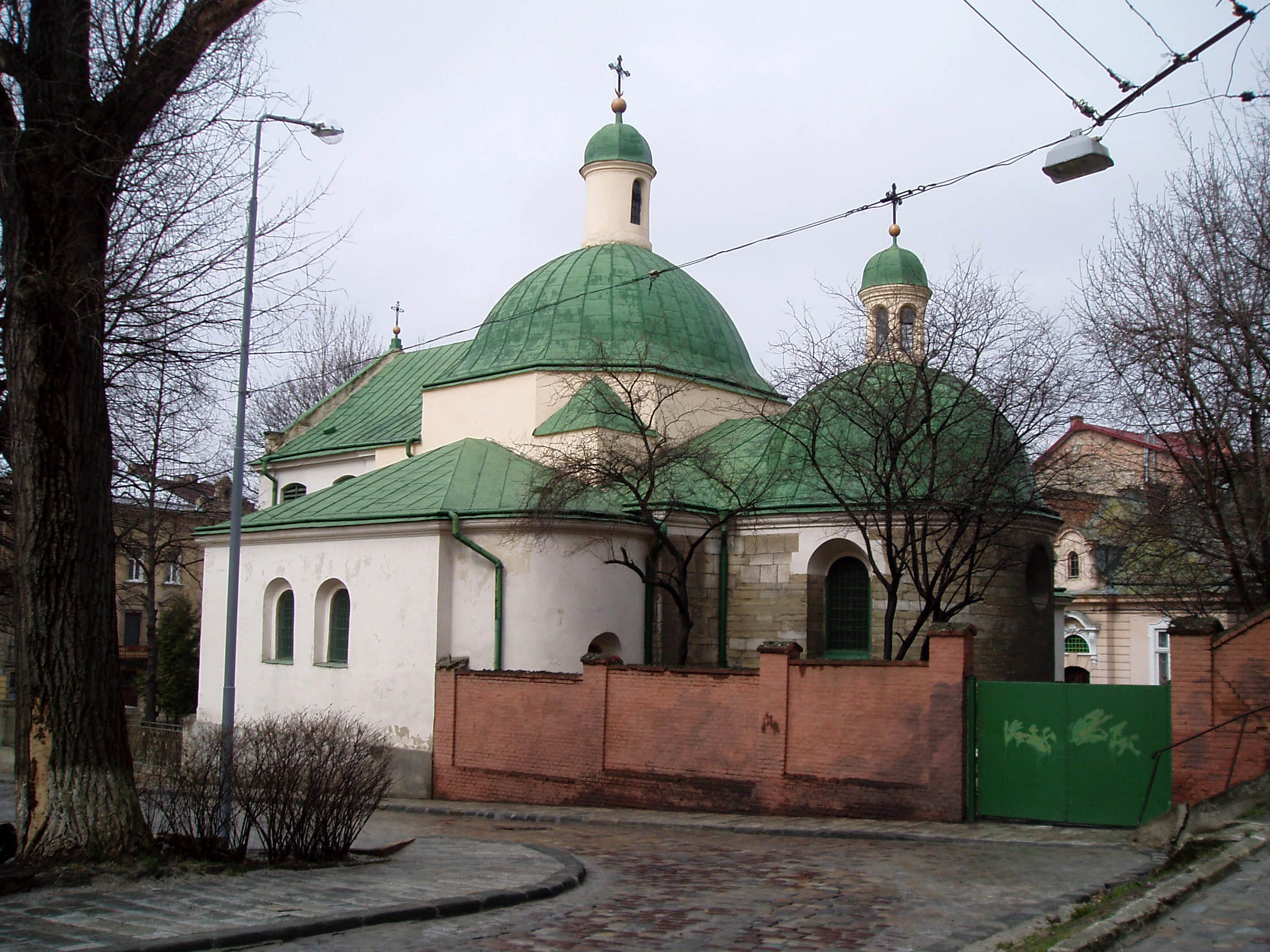
Church of Saint Nicholas

In Lviv, architectural monuments of the princely and Polish periods have been preserved, although after meaningful rebuilding. The Church of St. Nicholas (13th century) retains features of Galicia–Volhynia architecture: cross-in-square plan, lower walls and apses of white limestone.

Archaeological findings date back to the end of the 13th-14th centuries: Svyatoyursky Monastery, the Piatnytska Church, the Monastery and Greek Catholic Church of St. Onuphrius, the Church of St. John the Baptist and the Church of St. Mary Snizhna. The wooden Piatnytska Church served as a bastion and, according to the legend, was connected with Kniazha Gora by an underground passage. The stone church (17th century) repeats the princely predecessor.

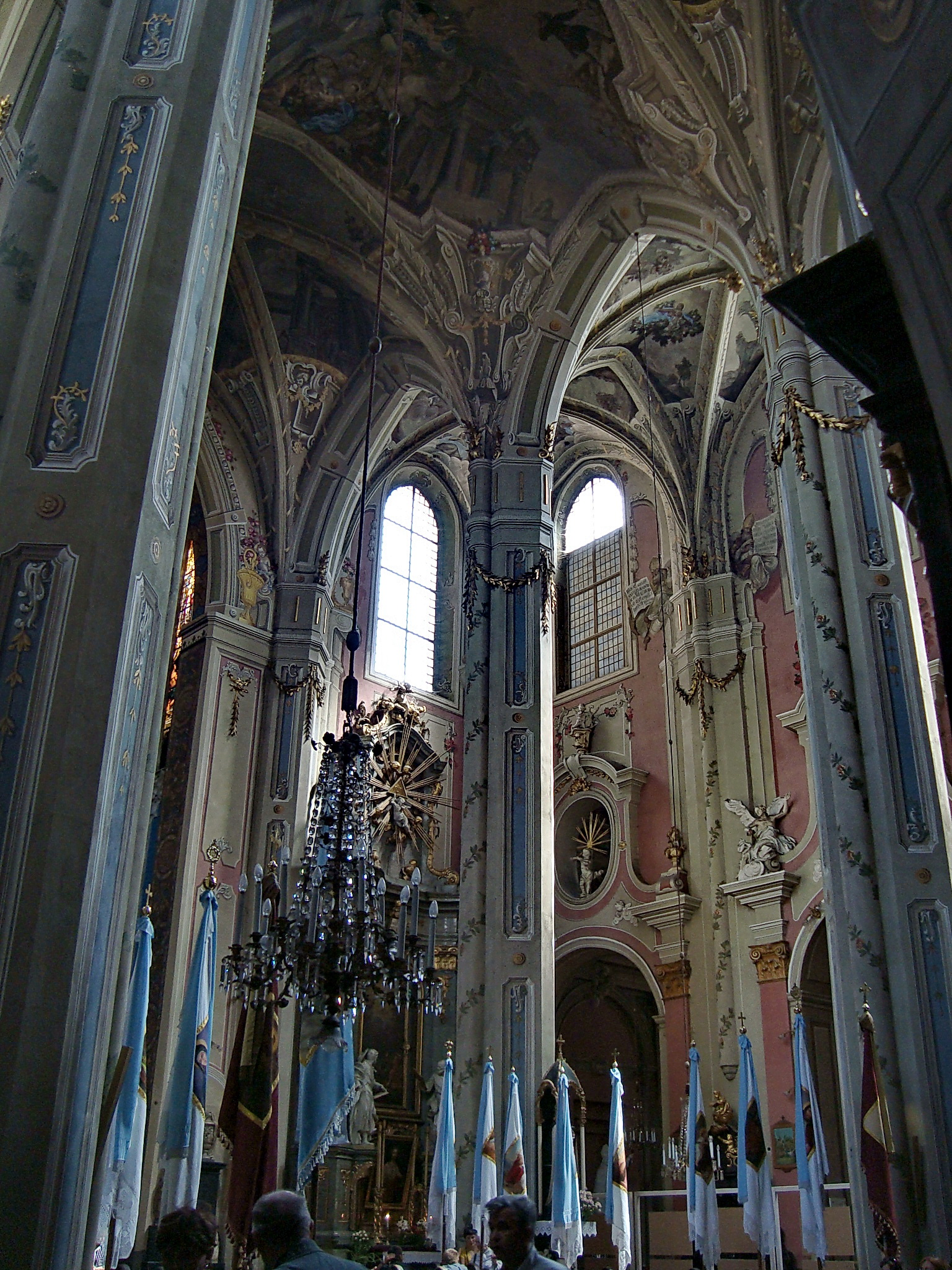
Interior of Latin cathedral

The wooden church of St. Onuphrius became a monastery in the 15th century. After a fire it was rebuilt in 1518. In 1550, a stone church was built at the expense of K. Ostrozhsky. In 1583, Ivan Fyodorov was buried in the church. The church of St. Mary Snizhna (rep. 1352) was the center of the German community, now it is a single-nave Romanesque basilica. The church of St. John the Baptist was built on the place of the Orthodox church, which Prince Leo gave to his wife Constantia and donated to the Dominicans. The cruciform masonry from the 14th–15th century has been preserved.

From the middle of the 14th century, the Western European Gothic style developed in Lviv. The first example of it was the Latin Cathedral built in the 15th century, which preserved the features of the original appearance: Gothic can be seen in the presbytery, altarpiece, buttresses and lancet windows. The architects were Peter Stecher, Nicholas Gonzago, Joachim Grom, Ambrosius Rabisch and Hans Stecher. Six vaults were planned, but only three were built. In the fire of 1527, the choir vaults and the tower collapsed, and the reconstruction was already in the Renaissance style.

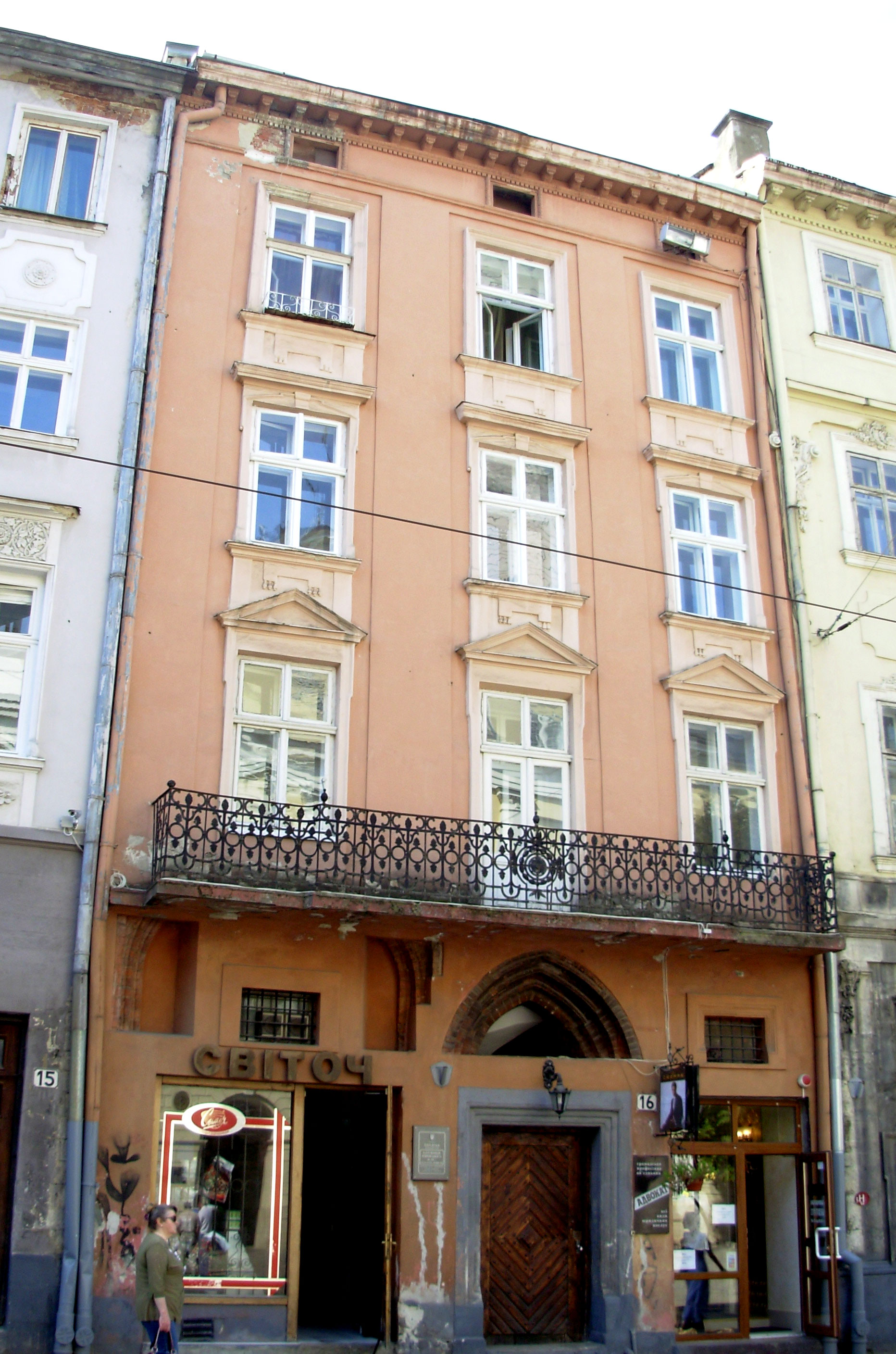
Market Square, 16

In modern Lviv, Gothic elements are preserved in the portals of the houses No.16 (16th century) and No. 28 (late 15th century) on Market Square, in the house No. 2 on Ruska Street (15th century), in the vaults of the first floors of the Korniakt Palace, in the house No.45 on Market Square (15th century). The fire of 1527 destroyed the Gothic building, but late Gothic motifs were found later. After 1527, German architects were replaced by Italians.

Among the preserved monuments of Gothic decorative sculpture are the base of the lion column (14th century, Lviv Art Gallery), the mascaron on the facade of the house No. 35 (Staroievreiska, 15th century), the end of the gutter in the house No. 4 (Ruska, 15th century), the wooden crucifixion of Gabershrak (1473, Latin Cathedral), the alabaster composition (second half of the 14th century, Lviv Art Gallery), wooden sculptures (15th century, Oles Castle).

The Armenian Cathedral, like the Latin Cathedral, was built in the second half of the 14th century and, despite significant reconstructions, has preserved its Armenian-Byzantine appearance (in plan, the oldest part of the Lviv Cathedral has much in common with the famous Ani Cathedral, although there is also a certain similarity with the Church of St. Pantaleon in the vicinity of Halych). The architect was a master of German origin Doring (according to other versions he was Italian or Armenian), invited by Armenian merchants from the Crimea. (Note: It is more likely that Doring was a Genoese who had arrived in Cafa. Alternatively, he may have been born in this Genoese colony.) In 1571, an octagonal bell tower with an onion dome was built next to the Armenian Cathedral according to the project of the architect Peter Krasovsky. From the Armenian cemetery, once adjacent to the cathedral, several tombstones from the 14th-18th centuries have been preserved.

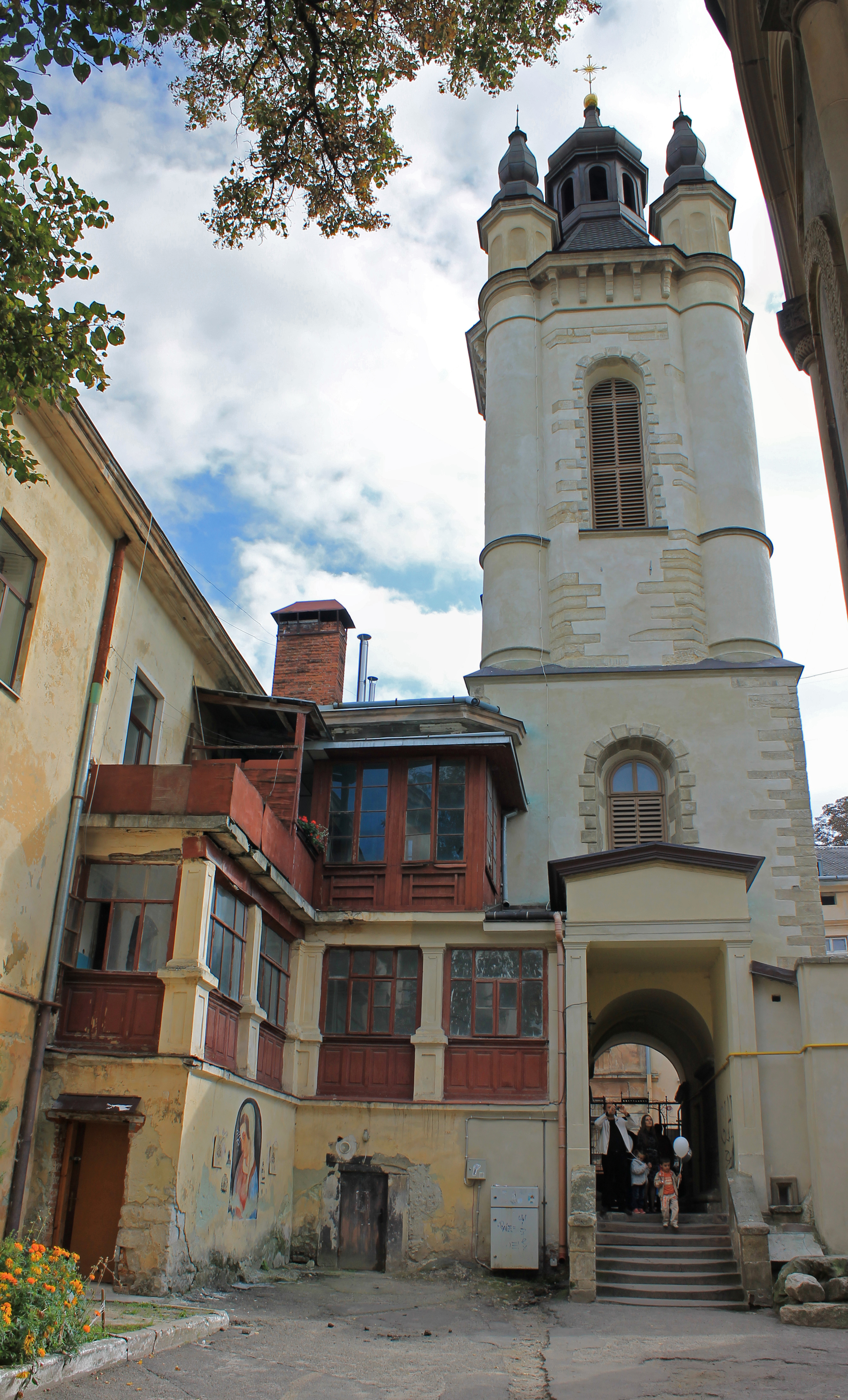
Bell tower of the Armenian Cathedral

According to the original plan, the cathedral was a cross-domed church of the Byzantine style. The dome rested on a twelve-sided tholobate. The type of the four-pillar temple and the masonry of the dome are specific to Armenian architecture, but the presence of three side apses, added in the 15th century, is characteristic of the Eastern European tradition (in addition, in 1437 an open arcade in the Mediterranean style was built on the southern side of the cathedral). During the restoration of the cathedral in 1925, the remains of frescoes from the first half of the 16th century were discovered in the window niches. Among the sculptural monuments, there is a tombstone of the Patriarch Stephen, who died in 1551, with Gothic and Renaissance elements, as well as 16th century reliefs (Thomas the Unbeliever and St. Sophia and her daughters) embedded in the walls of the sacristy, apparently taken from the tombstones of the destroyed cemetery.

In 1507, the wooden church of St. Anne was built with the money of the tailor's shop, but in 1509 during the siege of the city by the troops of the Moldavian Lord the church was burned. In 1554, the German merchant Stanzl Scholz built a house with a large courtyard — the first building in the city in the style of the Italian Renaissance (today the house No. 3 on Drukarska Street stands there). The Powder Tower (1554-1556), formerly part of the outer ring fortifications, and its contemporary, the Lviv Arsenal, are examples of Renaissance military architecture (although the walls of the first floor of the Arsenal and the tower adjoining it on the north side date from the 15th century).

At the end of the 16th century, the Black Stone House and the Korniakt Palace, the Venetian Stone and the Bandinelli Palace, the Lukashevich and Bernatovich Stones, the ensemble of the Church of the Dormition Church with the Chapel of the Three Saints and the Korniakt Tower, the Golden Rose Synagogue and the Benedictine Monastery were built. One of the best monuments of the Renaissance, a masterpiece of Lviv architecture, is the ensemble of the Church of the Dormition of the Theotokos, the construction of which was financed by the Brotherhood of the Dormition of the Theotokos, including the Greek merchant Konstantin Korniakt, as well as the Moldavian gentlemen Jeremiah Mogila and his brother Simion Mogila, the Moscow tsar Fyodor I Ioannovich and the Zaporizhzhia hetman Petro Sahaidachny.

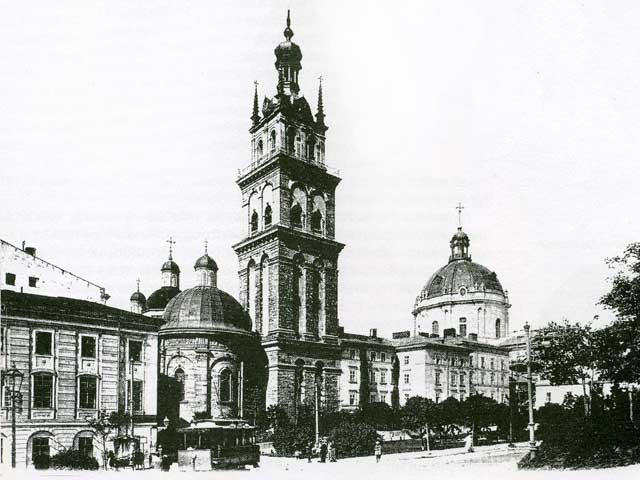
The Dormition Church in the 19th century

The author of the design of the Dormition Church was Paul the Roman (Paolo Dominici), who worked until 1597. In 1591, the confraternity concluded a contract with him, then Wojciech Kapinos (1592) and Ambrosius Blagosklonny (1593) joined the construction and finished the church in 1629. Roman used the foundations of the church burned down in 1571. The design is based on a three-domed composition. Two pairs of Tuscan columns divide the temple into three naves, supporting the drum with a dome. The apse is attached from the east, from the west—a narthex with choirs. The domes stand on one axis, the inner walls are flanked by a gallery. The main facade is divided by Tuscan pilasters, between which there are blind arches with windows. The first bell tower was built in 1567 by Peter Krasovsky, but it collapsed. The present tower was built in 1572-1578 under the direction of Peter Barbon and Peter the Roman. Originally it had three tiers and a hipped roof with a pyramidal lantern. In the lower level there is an arched entrance with a sculpture of a lion.

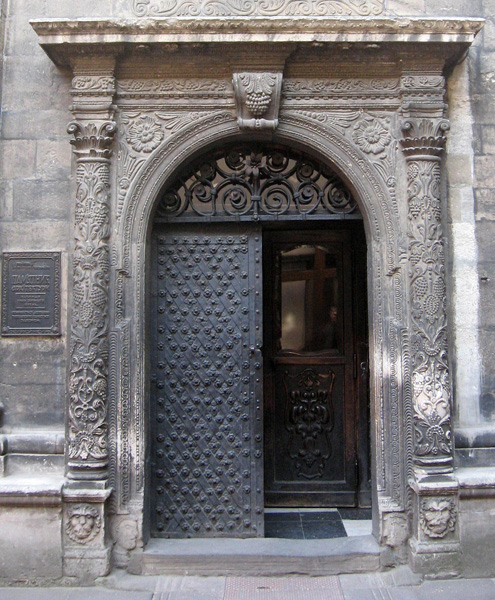
Three Saints Chapel Portal

The Three Saints Chapel, built in 1578–1591 according to the project of Peter Krasovsky, is close to the classical type of Renaissance buildings, but it is completed with three domes on octagonal bases. Two profiled pilasters divide the facade into three sections. The rich carving of the portal, located in the central section, resembles an iconostasis. Unlike many other architectural monuments, the ensemble of the Church of the Dormition of the Theotokos has survived almost in its original form (later changes mainly concerned the details of the interior).

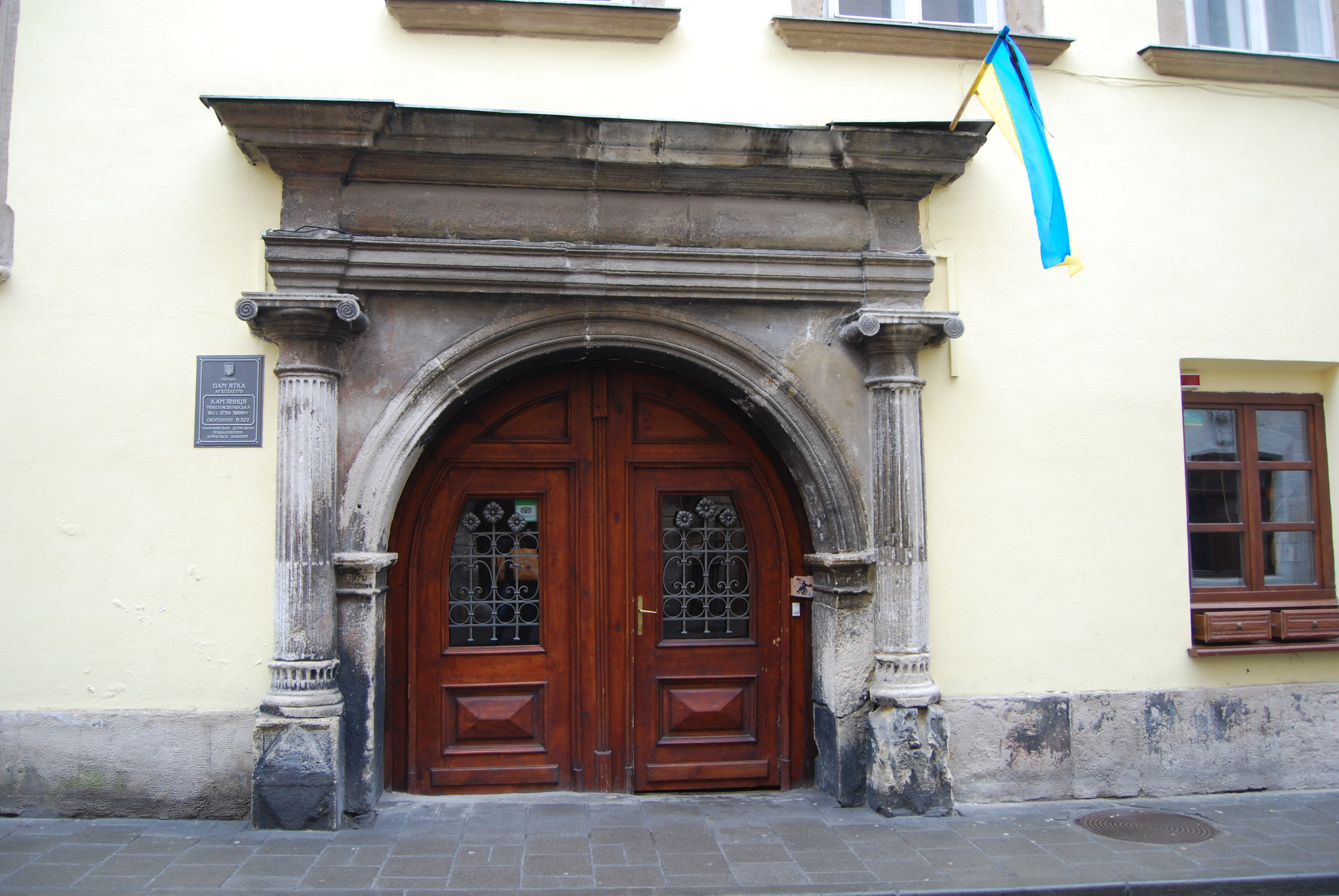
Virmenska Street, 20

A characteristic fragment of the 16th century residential architecture is the portal framed with Ionic columns in the house No. 20 on Virmenska Street (this is all that remains of the building built by the architect Peter the Italian). Among other fragments of the 16th century in the same street there are portals of houses Nos. 15 and 28, Gothic vaults in houses Nos. 25, 31 and 32, elements of Renaissance architecture in the architecture of houses Nos. 7, 8, 25 and 32, lion masks on the facade of house No. 8.

Ruska Street was first mentioned in documents in the second half of the 15th century (before that it was called Solianykiv Street), at that time there were only 14 buildings on it. In the basements of the houses No. 2 and 4 some Gothic fragments have been preserved — buttresses, cross vaults and bundles of thin semicolumns. In the yard of house No. 2 there is a mascaron in the shape of a lion's head with a bunch of grapes in its mouth above the arch. House No. 6 is characterized by the strict Renaissance profiling of the cellar. One of the most remarkable monuments of the Lviv Renaissance is the Benedictine Monastery, founded in 1593 according to the project of Pavel Romanin. Not much remains of the original decoration of the monastery facades. The three wide arches of the monastery building, adjacent to the later church building, form an open loggia.

The image of the polychrome Market Square largely determines the image of Lviv in the second half of the 16th century, when the Renaissance style took hold and flourished. Tall, narrow houses with three windows on the facade (two in the living room, one in the bedroom) predominated. According to the laws of the time, increasing the number of windows facing the square required special permission from the authorities and the payment of a large tax. Many houses built on the foundations and lower floors of Gothic buildings have preserved fragments of earlier eras (e.g. cross vaults and lancet arches, cellars with Gothic portals and 15th-century masonry).

The architect of the Black Stone House (House No. 4) is considered to be Peter Krasovsky, although some sources mention both Peter Barbon and Paul the Roman. The present Renaissance building was built in 1588–1589 on the place of a house that burned down in 1571. The first owners were the patrician widow Sophia Ganel and the merchant Tomas di Alberti, and in 1596, the house was bought by Jan Lorencovic, who opened a pharmacy there. The entire façade is covered with stone cut over time, forming a diamond-shaped rustication. The Stone House was once famous for its opulent interior, of which a few carved beams and columns with rich ornamentation between the windows have been preserved.

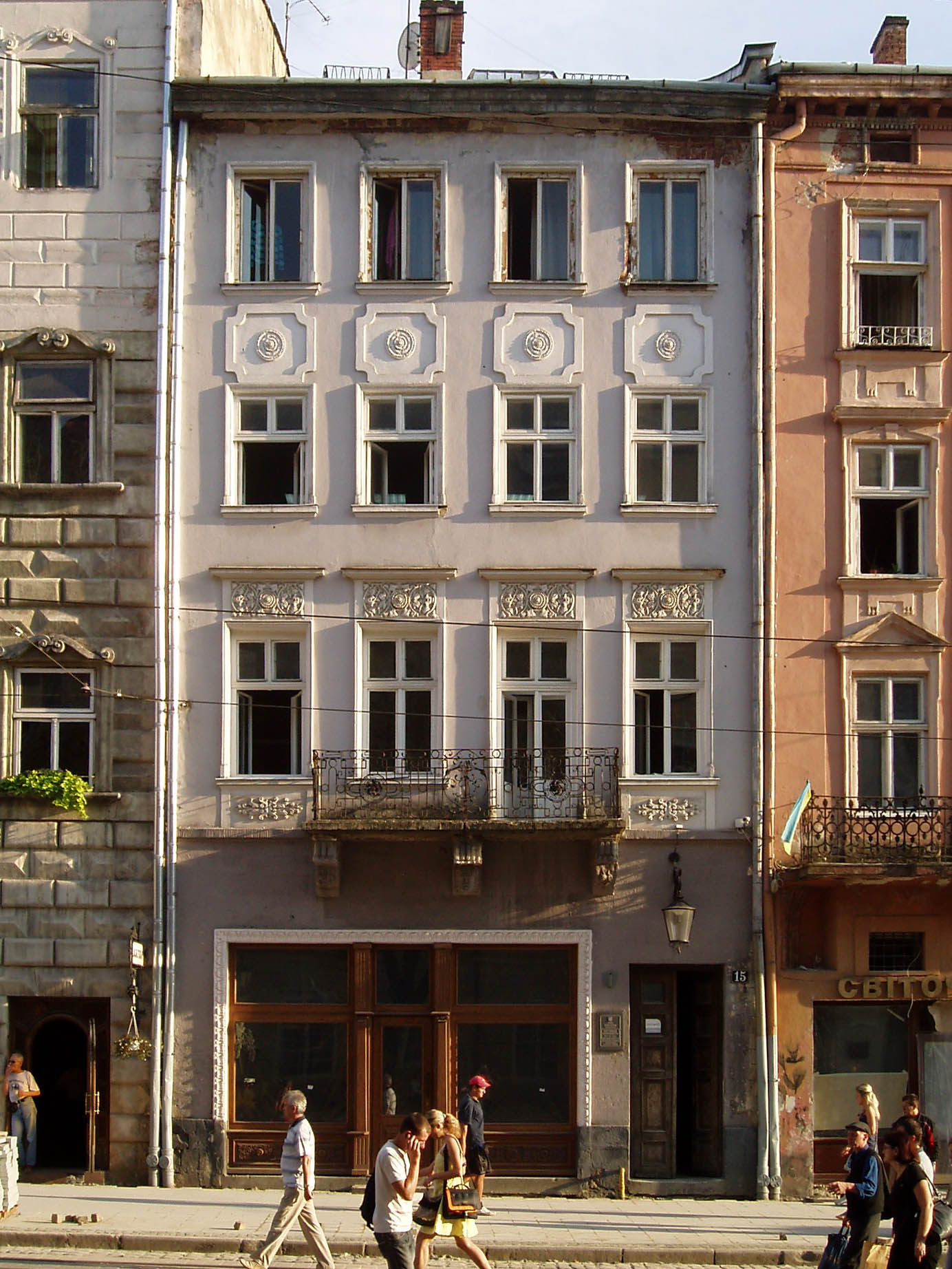
Market Square, 15

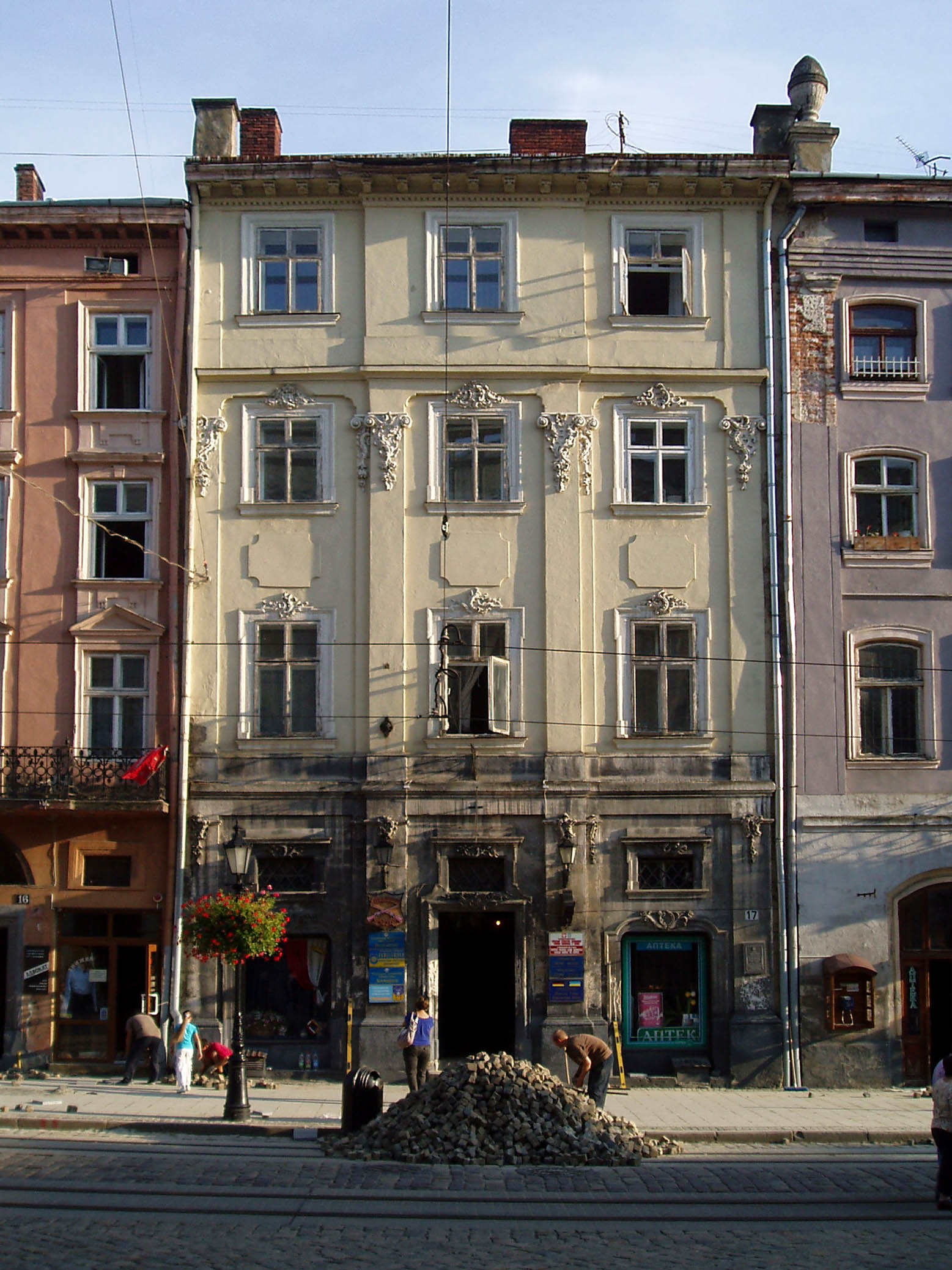
Market Square, 17

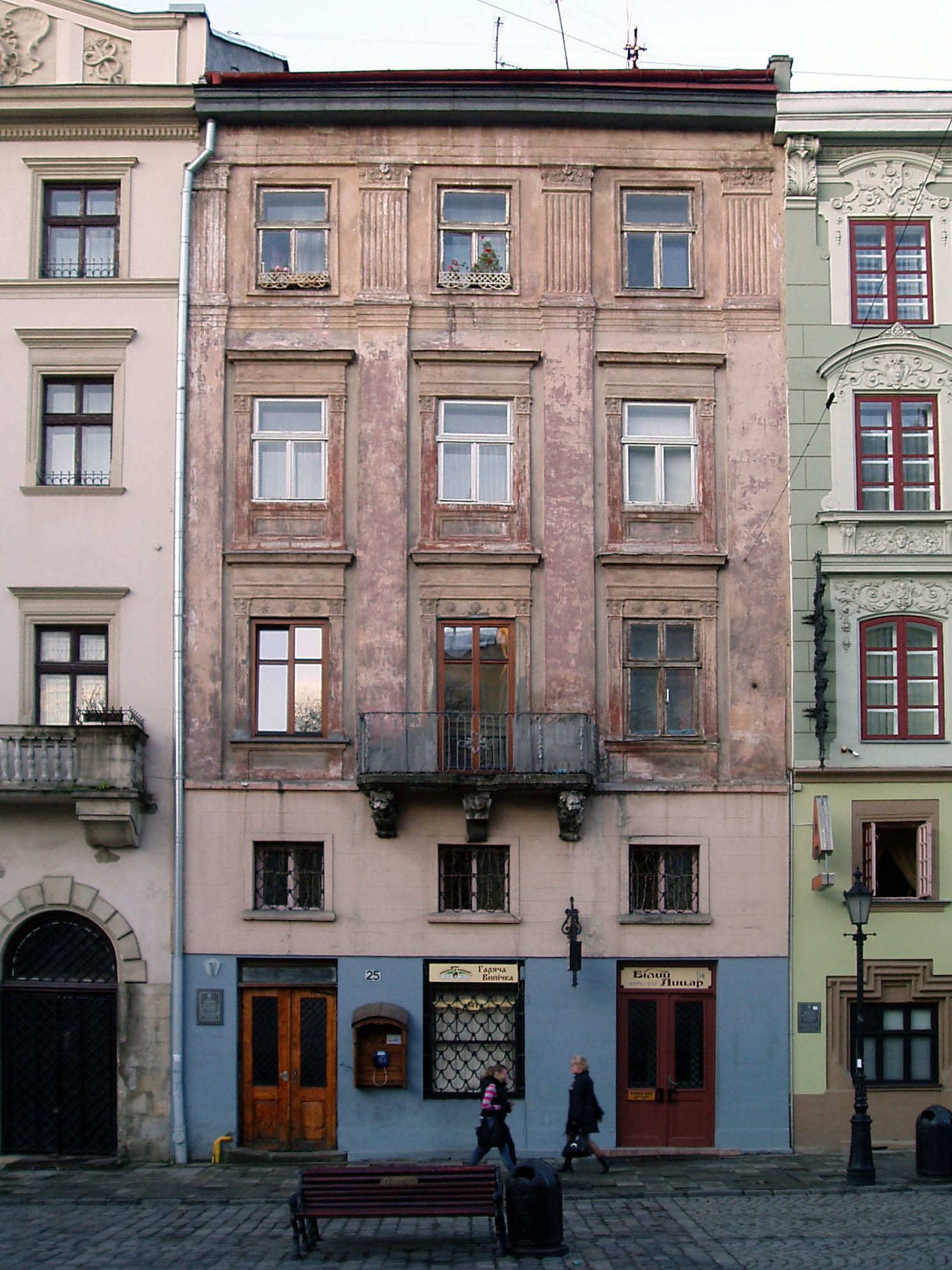
Market Square, 25

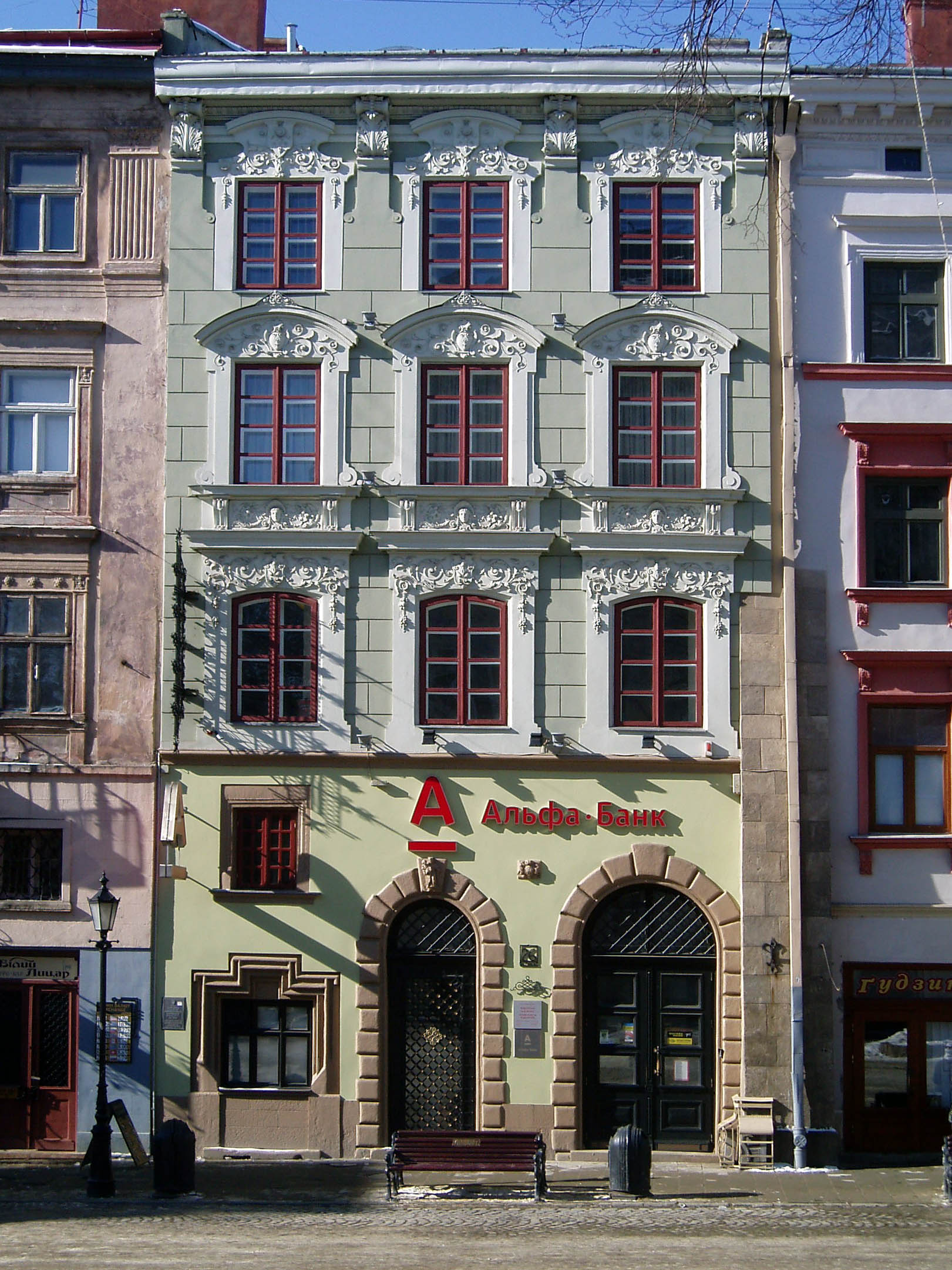
Market Square, 26

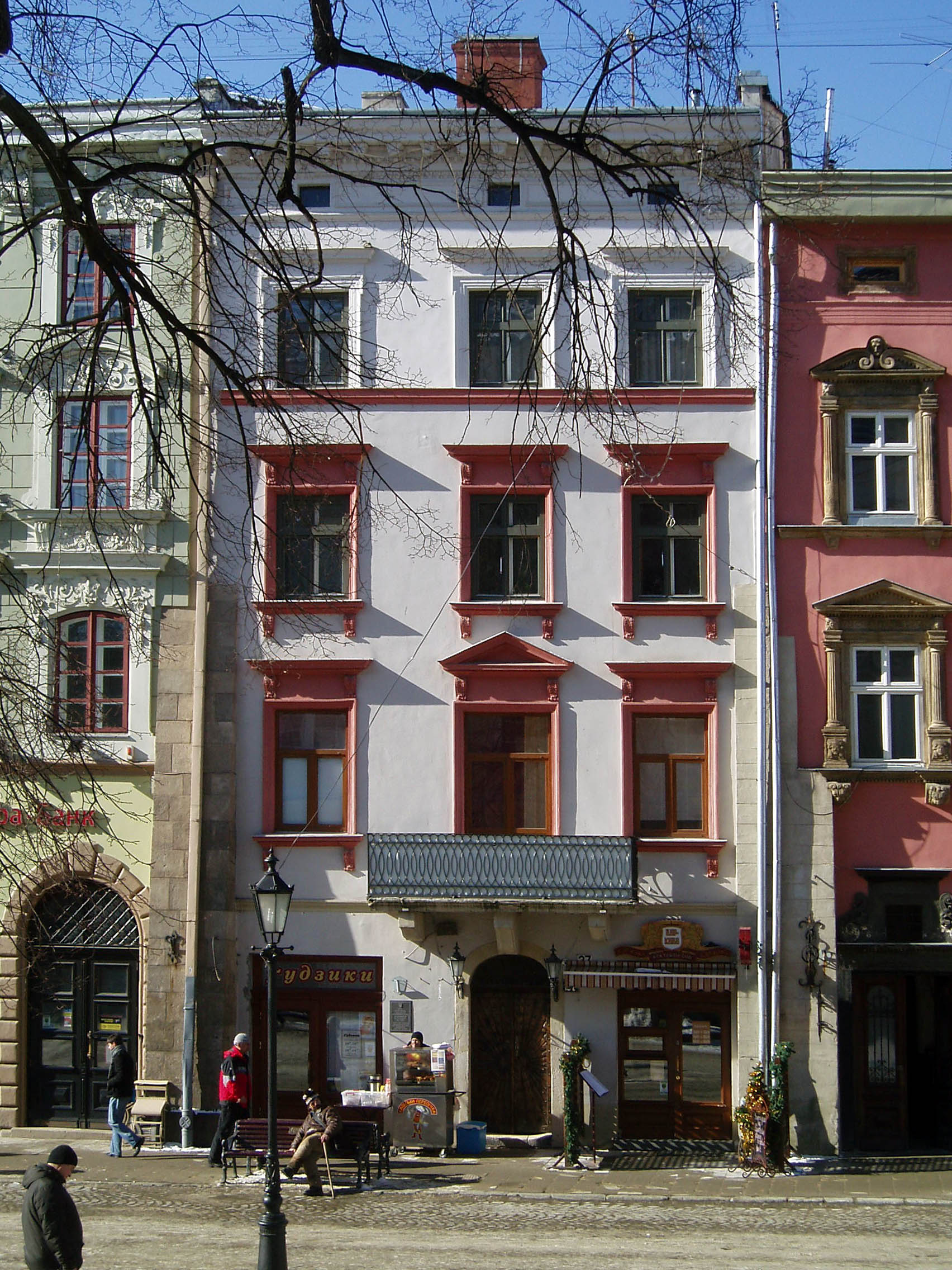
Market Square, 27

Another Renaissance building of no less artistic value is the neighboring Korniakt Palace (House No. 6). After a fire in 1571, the merchant Melchior Haze sold the property to Konstantin Korniakt, who received royal permission to build a six-window facade. In 1580 the palace was completed according to the design of Peter Barbon (apparently Paul the Roman was also involved). The ground floor, which was used for commercial premises, is divided by arched openings with a portal offset from the central axis and three windows. The rear facade of the building facing Fedorov Street is expressive, especially the rusticated portal with the date of construction carved on it. On the first floor there is a Gothic hall with a lancet ceiling. The decoration of the palace is the so-called "Italian courtyard", framed on three sides by open loggias.

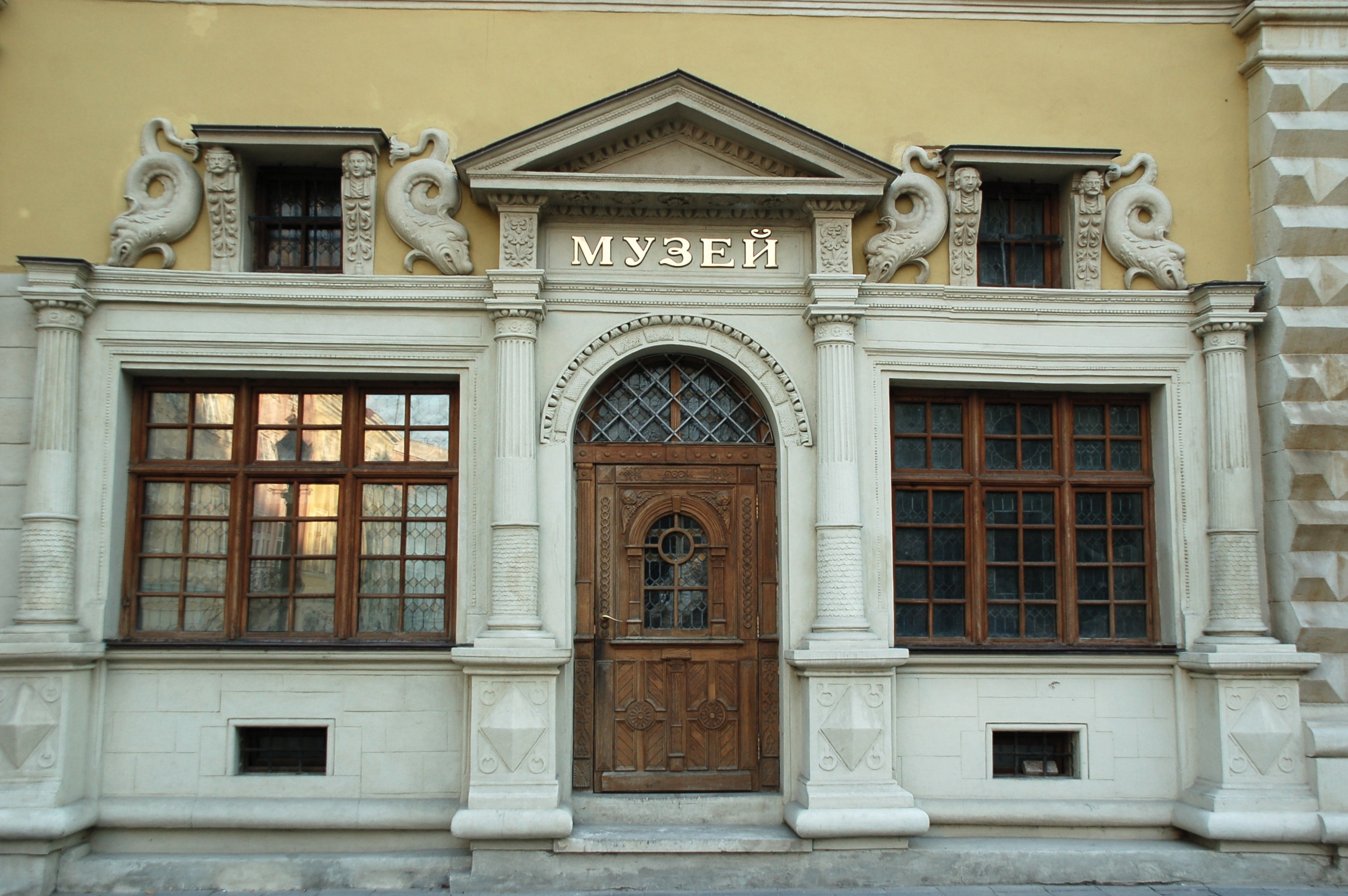
The Bandinelli Palace portal

On the corner of Market Square and Stavropihiiska Street there is the Bandinelli Palace (house no. 2). It was built in 1589 at the expense of the merchant Janos Vedelsky on the site of an earlier Gothic building (Gothic vaults are preserved on the first floor). The clear division of the main and side facades, the strong corner rustication and decorative reliefs symbolize the principles of Renaissance architecture.

In the same year the Venetian Stone House (house No. 14) was built according to the project of Pavel Romanin and with the participation of Pavel Lucky. It belonged to the Dalmatian merchant Antonio di Massari, who represented the interests of Venice in Lviv as a consul (his status was emphasized by the winged lion of St. Mark placed above the portal of the house). Characteristic elements of the facade are the rhombic stones and the curls of the window sills. On the corner of Market Square and Dom Street stands the monumental house of Scholz-Wolfowicz (No. 23), built by a wealthy Silesian family with elements of Italian and German-Flemish Renaissance. The corner of the third floor is decorated with a sculptural group Baptism of Christ by Jan Zaremba.

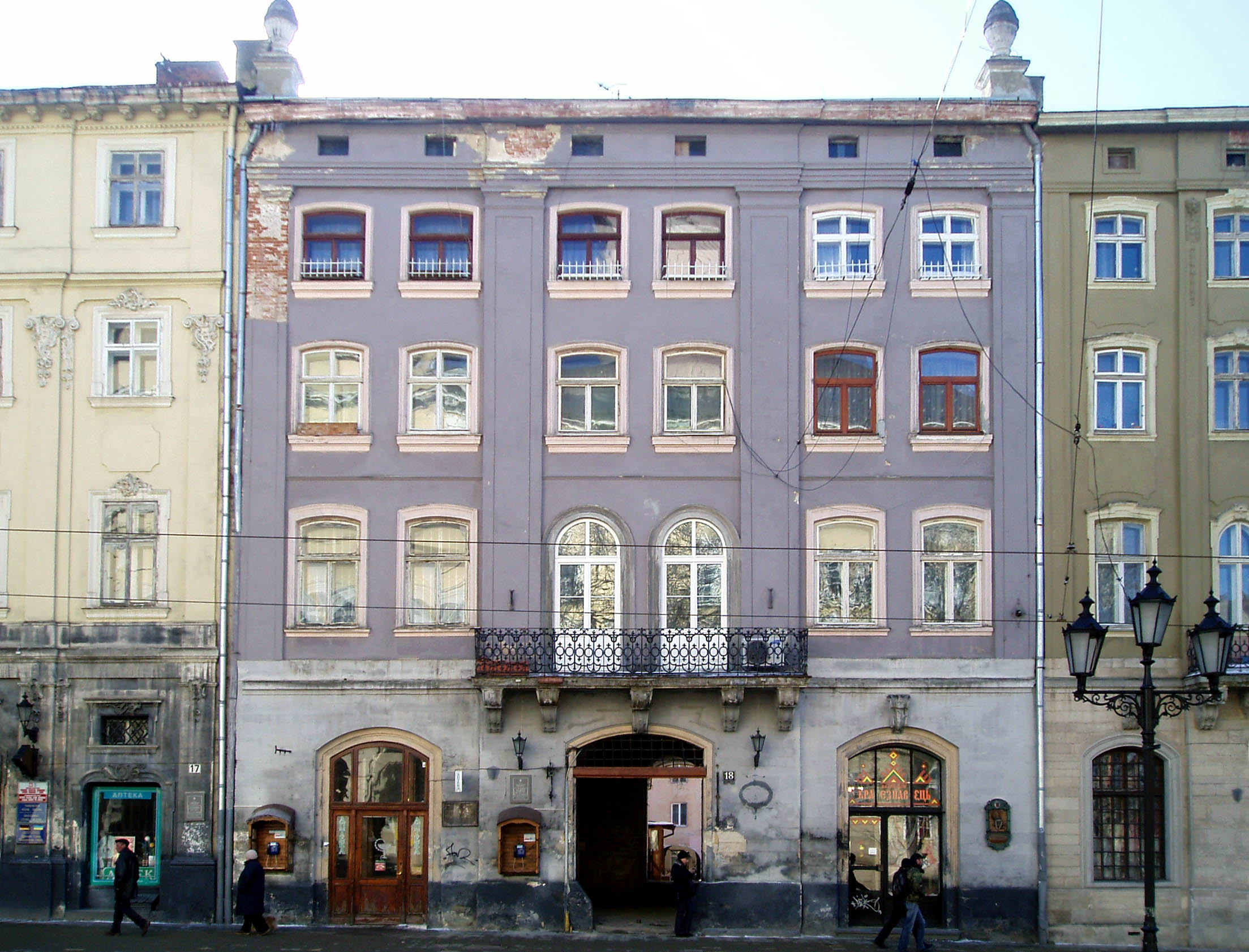
Market Square, 18

The neighboring Massarivska Stone House (house no. 24) was built in the 15th century. The foundations, Gothic vaults and windows on the first floor have been preserved from that period. After a fire in 1527, the building was completely rebuilt in the Renaissance style. Renaissance architectural features are visible through the late layers in many buildings of the 16th century on Market Square. Among them are the Justglatzovska Stone House (No. 12), the Alembeks' Stone House (No. 13), the Rorajski's Stone House (No. 16) and the Gutheterovska Stone House (No. 18), built in 1533 and long considered one of the most beautiful and richest palaces on the square.

Of particular interest is Gepner's stonemasonry (house No. 28), in whose architecture you can see the characteristics of different styles: Gothic buttresses and vaults in the entrance hall, richly decorated portal and frames of the windows on the second floor in Renaissance style. In the place of the present house No. 9, built in 1634, the Catholic archbishop had his residence since the last quarter of the 14th century, in the first quarter of the 15th century Prince Svydryhailo was a guest here, and Polish kings repeatedly stayed in the palace. The neighboring Lubomirski Palace (No. 10) was the home of the poet Szymon Szymonowic.

House No. 17, now in rococo style, was built in 1574 for the wealthy Saxon Franz Vening, who soon became the mayor of Lviv. On the corner of Market Square and Drukarska Street there is a stone-built house Under the Deer (No. 45), remarkable for its Gothic cellars and arches on the first floor. In the center of Market Square there is a complex of the 19th century City Hall. The first mention of the building dates back to 1381, when a fire destroyed the wooden town hall of the new municipality. In 1404, a gallery for a trumpeter was added to the Town Hall and a clock was installed on the tower. At the end of the 15th century, the town hall was radically rebuilt: in 1491, the architect Hans Stecher built a new tower with an attic. However, in 1527 and 1571, it was badly damaged by fires. Only a few fragments of the medieval town hall have survived, now scattered in various places (statues of two seated lions with shields decorating the cornice, several lion sculptures from the facade, and a relief depicting a boat with oarsmen). The first Baroque building was the Jesuit Garrison Church of Sts. Peter and Paul, begun in 1610.

== Population ==
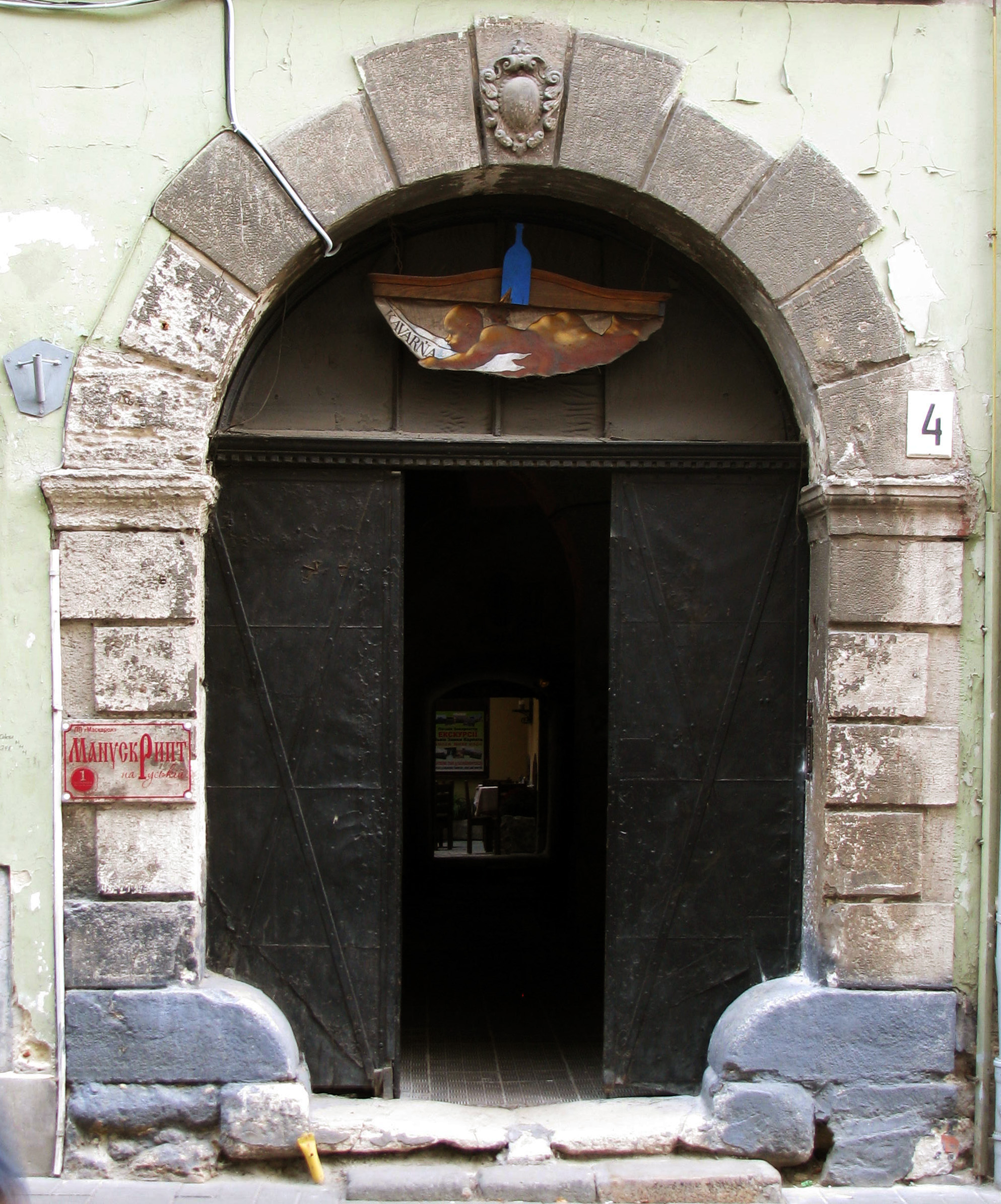
Portal on Ruska Street, 4.

The ethnic history of medieval Lviv was complex and dynamic. In the second half of the 13th century, peasants, merchants and craftsmen from the surrounding lands of the Galicia–Volhynia Kingdom, as well as refugees from Principality of Kiev, flocked to the protection of the prince's castle. There is information that Armenians and Tatars served in the army of Daniel Romanovich and Leo Danilovich, so they could well be among the guards of the Lviv castle. With the development of foreign trade relations, foreign merchants, craftsmen, architects and scientists from among Germans, Armenians, Jews, Tatars, Hungarians, Czechs, Arabs (Saracens), Greeks and Italians began to settle in Lviv.

At the turn of the 13th and 14th centuries, Lviv already had separate neighborhoods of Ruthenians (in the eastern part of the city), Jews and Saracens (in the south), Armenians and Tatars (in the north), designated by Prince Leo Danilovich. During the Polish period, the main ethnic groups in Lviv were Poles, Germans, Jews, Armenians, and Ruthenians. There were also significant and less significant communities of Greeks, Italians, Tatars, Hungarians, Czechs, Lithuanians, Wallachians, and Karaites.

Information about various ethnic communities in the old Polish period of Lviv's history can be found in court and tax materials (tax registers, taxes on houses and land, population tax), inventories of towns, villages and estates (inventories and lustration), and metric records. Most information is preserved about the inhabitants of the middle district, which in the Middle Ages was considered Lviv proper, and much less about the inhabitants of the suburbs, suburban villages, and various juridical districts (districts not under the control of the magistrate because they belonged to the king, nobility, or clergy). Jews were almost always taxed, registered, and described separately from the Christian population, so the information about them is more extensive and accurate.

Natural population growth in medieval Lviv was lower than in rural areas, and often negative due to high mortality rates. High infant mortality, years of famine, epidemics, fires, and wars were common in Lviv. Immigration from surrounding villages and neighboring states was the main factor in the growth of the city's population. The most intensive immigration of Germans to Lviv took place in the 14th and early 15th centuries. In the second half of the 15th century, the influx of German colonists decreased significantly, and in the first half of the 16th century it almost ceased (the main number of German immigrants came from Silesia, as well as from the cities of Poland and the Ruthenian Voivodeship, which had large German colonies). Since the 15th century, there was a rural colonization of Lviv's surroundings, including Poles, Germans and Wallachians.

At the beginning of the 15th century, the population of Lviv was about 5.5 thousand people, of which up to 600 people lived in the Galician and Tatar (Kraków) suburbs. According to other data, about 6 thousand people lived in Lviv, including about 4–4.5 thousand inhabitants in the middle suburbs. The absolute majority of the inhabitants of the middle district (about 4/5) were Germans, they were also the majority among the zechmists (shopkeepers), a significant part among the property owners (more than 60%), merchants and in the city government. Business records were kept in Latin and German. The second largest community in the middle estates were Armenians (up to 10%), who made up more than 11% of the property owners. Ruthenians made up 5% of the property owners, Poles — a little more than 4%.

The fifth largest ethnic group in the middle estates were Jews. Germans also predominated in the suburbs, although the proportion of Ruthenians and Tatars was much higher than within the city walls.

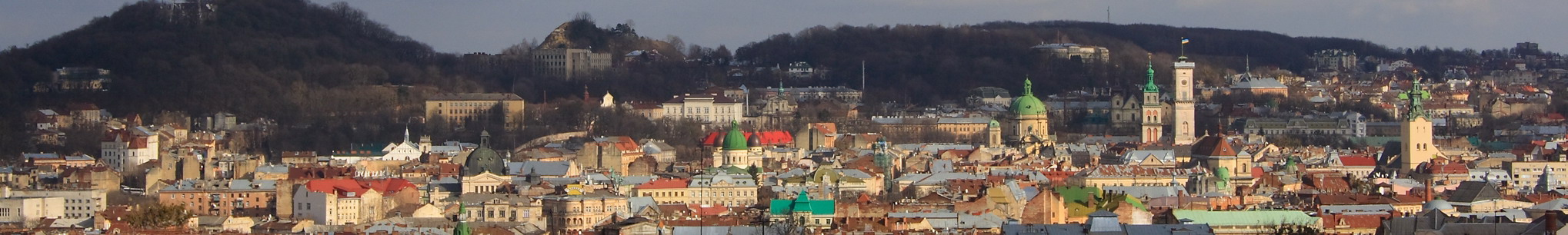
Modern view of Lviv's medieval district.

At the beginning of the 16th century in Lviv lived from 7 to 10 thousand people. According to other data, in the second quarter of the 16th century there were 6.7 to 7 thousand inhabitants in the city, including about 2.7 thousand in the two suburbs and Podzamcha. After the fire of 1527, the number of inhabitants of the suburbs briefly exceeded the population of the almost completely destroyed suburbs. At the end of the 16th-beginning of the 17th century the population of the city amounted to about 17-20 thousand people, including more than 12 thousand lived in the suburbs (if at the beginning of the 16th century the majority of Lviv citizens still lived in the suburbs, at the end of the same century there was less than a third of all citizens). The Galician suburb was inhabited mainly by Poles, as well as Germans and Ruthenians, while the Krakow suburb (especially the legal district of the royal headman) was inhabited by Jews, Armenians and Ruthenians, as well as Poles.

In the 16th century, the influx of German immigrants decreased significantly, but the number of Poles and Ruthenians from Ruthenia and Belz, Poles from Lesser Poland (especially from the capital Krakow), as well as from Greater Poland and Mazovia, increased dramatically. In the second quarter of the nineteenth century, among those who became citizens of Lviv, 54% were Poles, 15% Ruthenians, 11% Germans, and 2% Armenians. In addition, among those who received the city privileges, the share of Lviv natives was constantly growing. It should be remembered, however, that in the 16th century only about 1,000 citizens were entitled to the city charter, who together with their families made up a quarter of Lviv's population. Accordingly, a significant part of Ruthenians and Armenians, almost all Jews and even many poor Poles, who did not have recommendations from local shops, lived in Lviv without city privileges.

According to the analysis of a number of sources, in the second quarter of the 16th century Poles made up 38% of the population of Lviv and the nearest urban villages, Ruthenians (Ukrainians) — 24%, Jews — 8%, Germans — 8%, Armenians — 7%, other and unknown — 15%. At the end of the 16th century, in the ethnic composition of the population of Lviv were Poles about 50%, Jews — 20%, Ruthenians — 20%, Armenians — 10%.

In the first half of the 16th century, the Poles, who assimilated the Germans, became the largest ethnic group in the Midland. In second place were the Armenians, but in the middle of the century the Jews came close to them, and in the second half of the 16th century they overtook the Armenians. The Ruthenians had the smallest share among the largest ethnic groups in the suburbs. In the suburbs, the share of Poles also increased steadily during the 16th century. The Ruthenians held second place for a long time, but in the second half of the century they were overtaken by the Jews (especially in the suburbs of Kraków).

=== Ruthenians ===
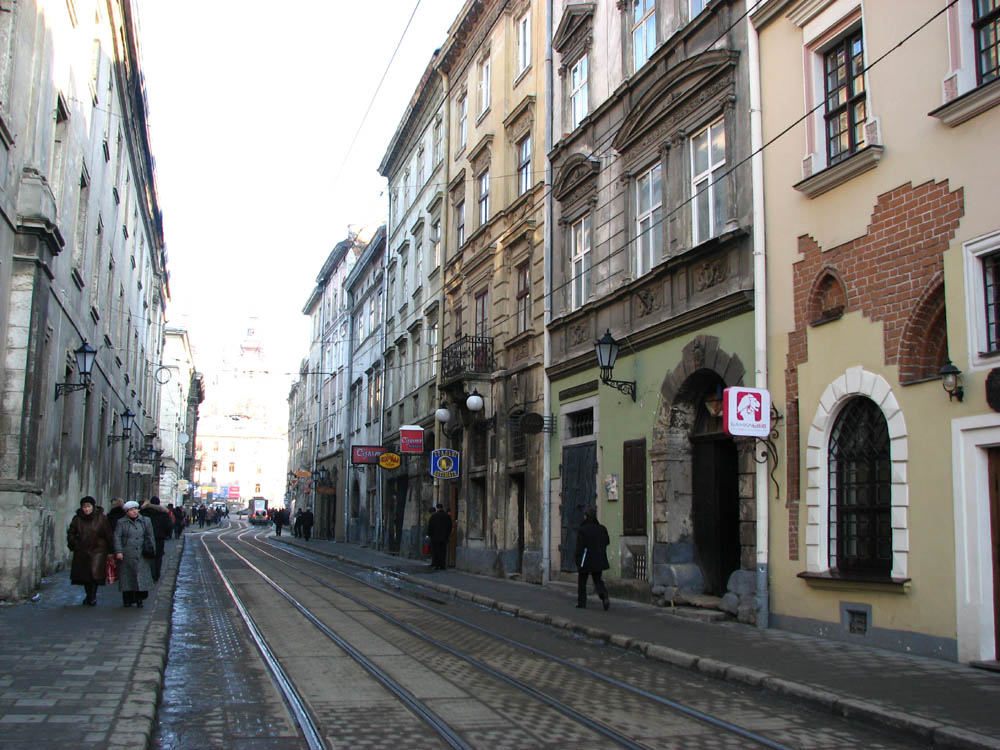
Ruska Street

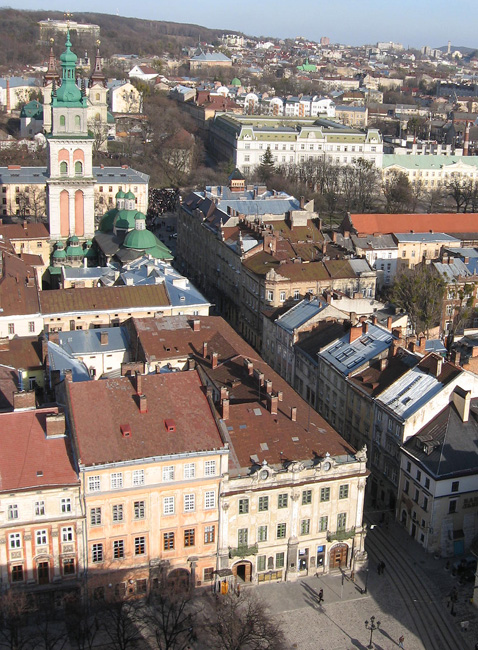
View from the Town Hall to Ruska Street

Ruthenians were the titular nation of the Galicia–Volhynia Kingdom and a significant group of Lviv's population in the 13th – first half of the 14th century. However, even then their share in the city was decreasing, and the privileged position of foreigners caused discontent.

Unlike Halych, Terebovlia and Peremyshl, Lviv initially had a significant number of foreign merchants and craftsmen. In order to attract specialists, the authorities granted economic privileges, which contributed to the predominance of foreigners. Lviv, as an outpost of princely power, was opposed to the old Galician centers, which limited the migration of Ruthenians. There was no strong Ruthenian ethnic nucleus in the city. The foreigners had an advantage due to the absence of municipal law in the Principality of Galicia–Volhynia. The Germans used elements of the Magdeburg Law, which ensured their control over Lviv. Ruthenians could not compete with foreign merchants and craftsmen. The relocation of the city center to the area of today's Market Square contributed to the decline of Ruthenian influence. The Magdeburg law formally guaranteed equality and was used mainly by Germans, and Ruthenians were often unaware of its norms.

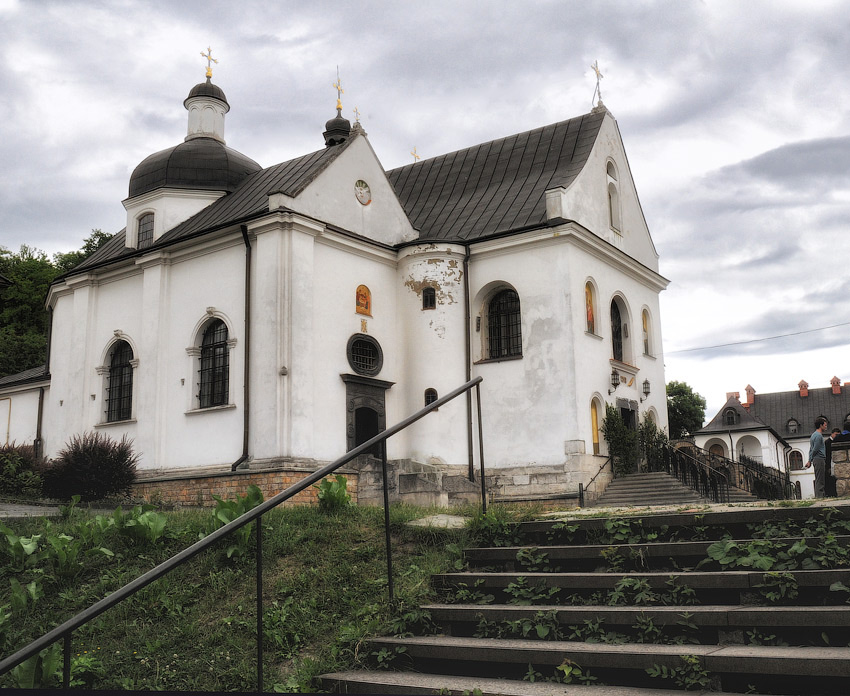
St. Onuphrius Monastery

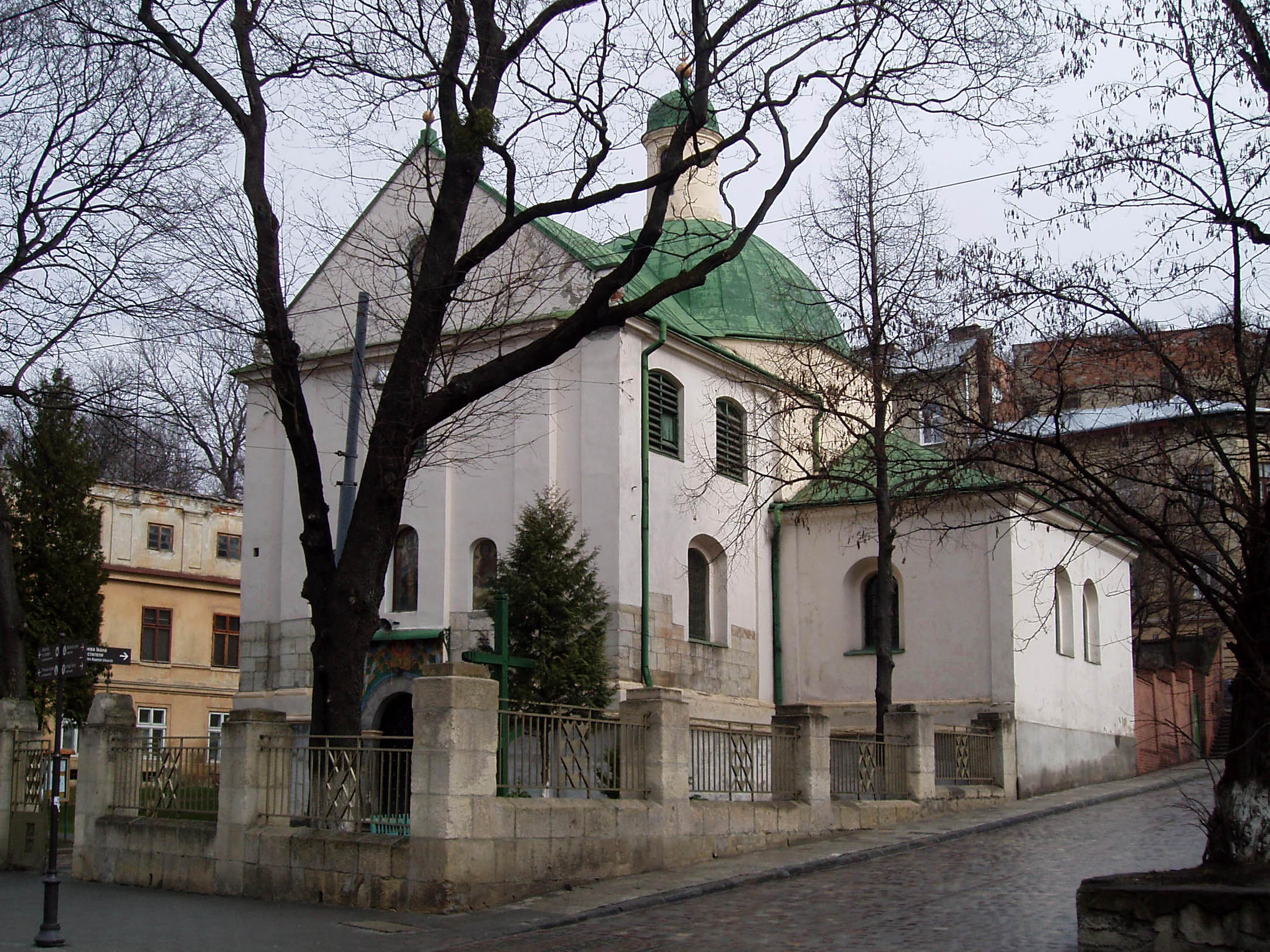
Saint Nicholas Church

In the second half of the 14th century, the Ruthenians found themselves outside the authority of the city. They had no self-government, and German law was alien to them. Their situation was worse than that of the Armenians and Jews, who retained traditional forms of government. At the beginning of the 15th century the Ruthenians were a minority in Lviv. Their quarter numbered only 13 families. They did not play a significant role in the political life of the city. A few wealthy Ruthenian families remained influential. Ruthenians were represented in the magistrate's office and among the shopkeepers. Their position under the German rule (14th-15th centuries) was better than under the later Polish rule. The corporatization of society limited the integration of Ruthenian peasants in Lviv. In the 15th and 16th centuries, only 16.8% of those who received city rights were from villages, and half of them came from Poland.

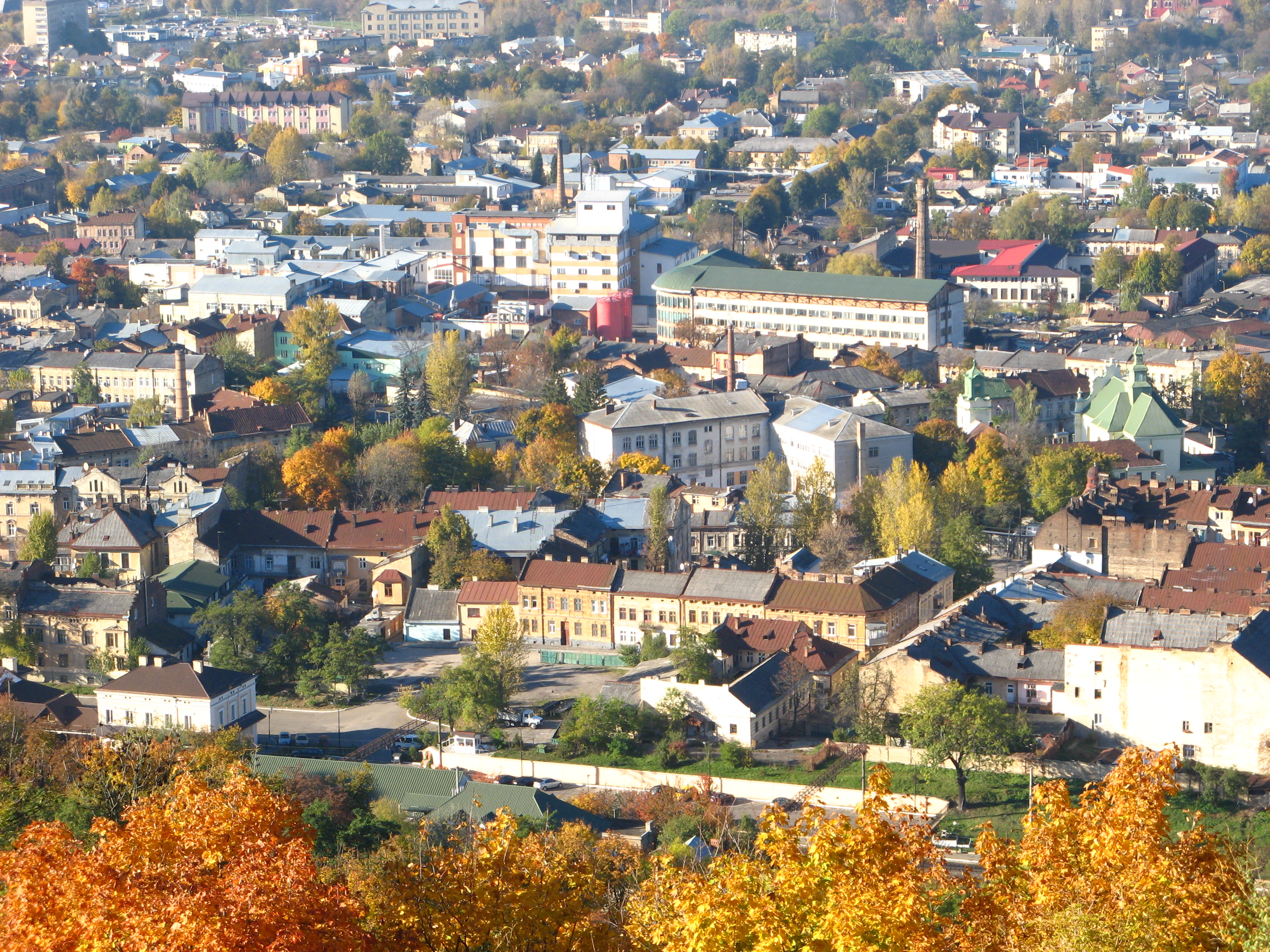
Modern development of Pidzamche

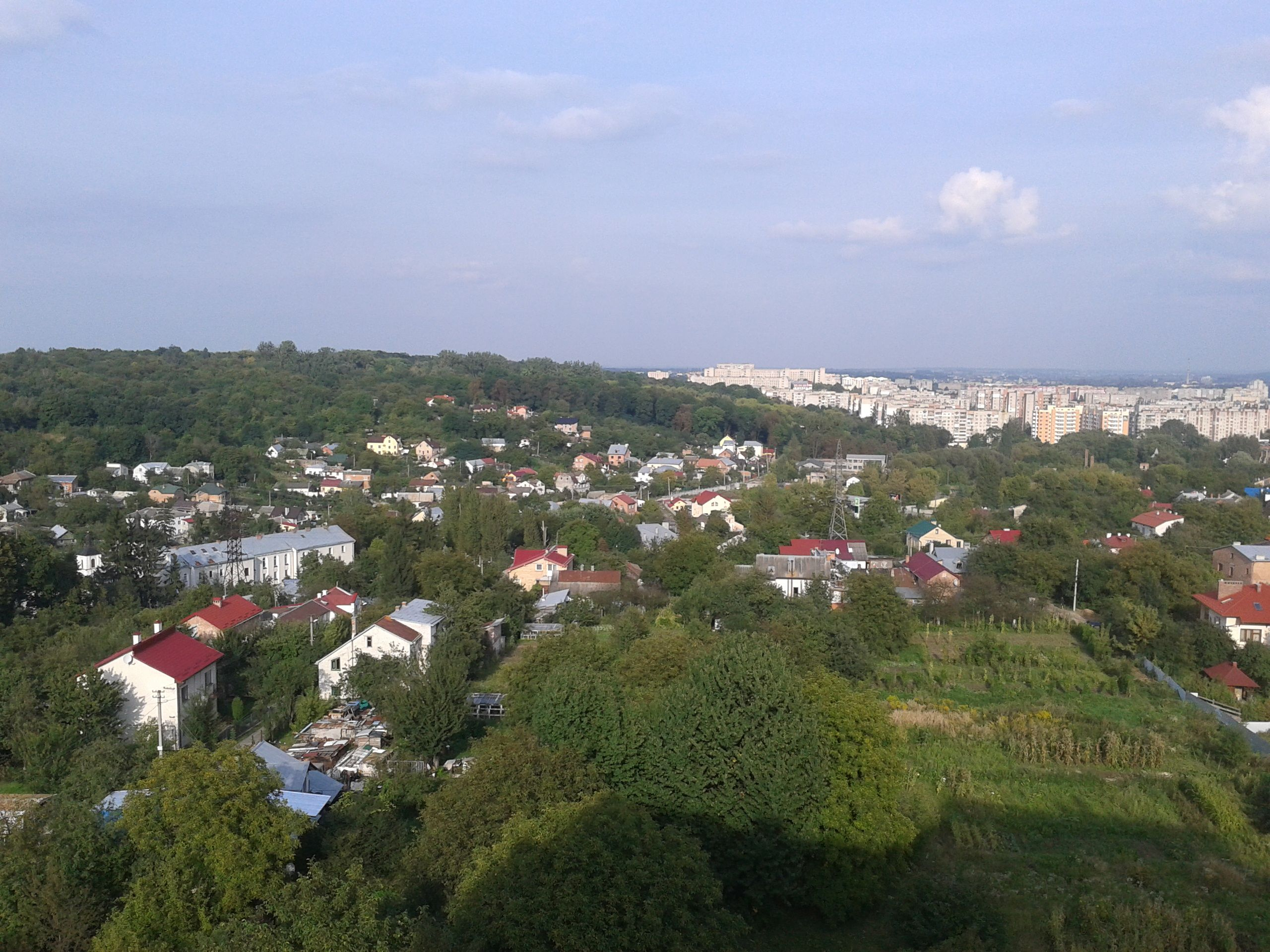
Holosko and Zamarstyniv

In the 16th century, the Ruthenian community grew but remained without basic rights. (Note: For example, in 1525, Sigismund I confirmed the prohibition for Ruthenians to own houses outside the boundaries of the national quarter, to engage in crafts other than those practised by their fathers, and to be members of workshops to which they had not previously belonged.) They dominated among merchants but were underrepresented among artisans. However, the crisis of the transit trade stimulated the growth of the internal market, which encouraged the influx of Ruthenians.

Ruthenians actively traded with neighboring towns. Settlers from villages were few due to the restrictions of the Polish Sejm, which limited the freedom of peasants. The inhabitants of urban villages, such as Zamarstyniv, Klepariv, Znesinnia, and Holosko, often had pre-medieval status. At the end of the 16th century, Poles became predominant in the villages near Lviv.

The privilege of Sigismund II Augustus (1572) provided for the equality of Ruthenians with Catholics, but it was never approved. Restrictions on property ownership, trade, and crafts prevented the Ruthenians from competing with other ethnic groups.

In the first half of the 16th century, the Ruthenians became more active, but in the second half of the century their situation worsened. The Union of Brest in 1596, weakened the community, resulting in the strengthening of the Catholic patriciate and new restrictions for the Orthodox.

=== Germans ===
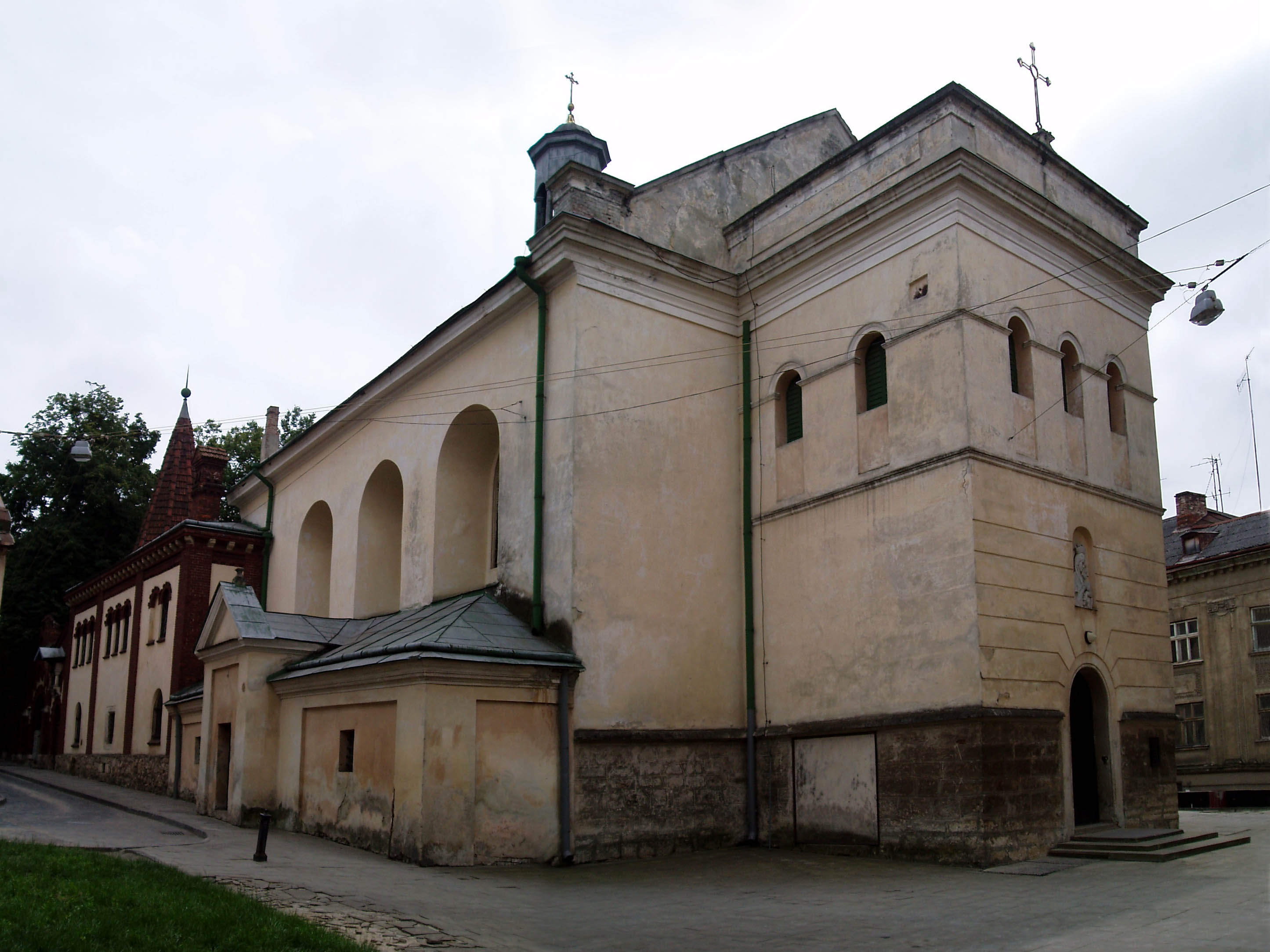
Maria Snizhna Church

Due to the first German immigrants, who brought the norms and traditions of the German legal culture to Galicia, a significant part of the early city documents were written in German. During the reign of Prince Leo Danilovich, the first mayor of the city was Berthold Stecher, who owned mills and estates in the vicinity of Lviv. His son Mateus Stecher also became a mayor.

The German community in Lviv grew considerably in the early 14th century. The use of the lion symbol in the city's coat of arms probably originated from it. Under Prince Yuri II Boleslav, German merchants were granted privileges. In the middle of the 14th century German colonists, with the participation of the Shteher family, founded the Church of the St. Mary Snizhna. There were many craftsmen, architects and sculptors among the Germans.

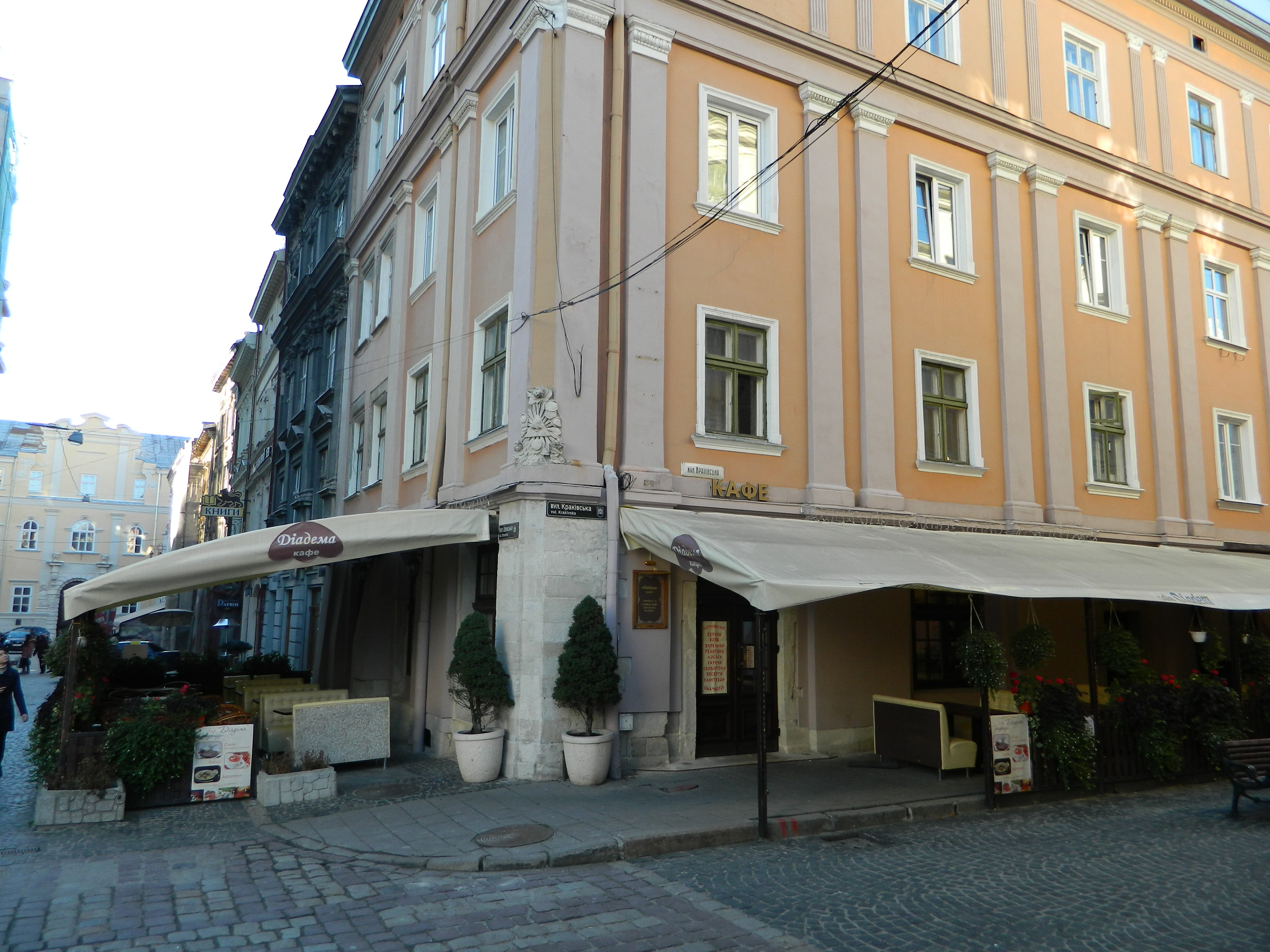
Abrekas' House

In the second half of the 14th century, Lviv resembled a typical German city. German names were widespread among the founders. In 1356, Casimir III granted Lviv the Magdeburg Rights, which made Catholics, including Germans, a privileged class. In the 1380s, Peter Stecher rose to prominence, supervising the construction of the Latin Cathedral and the waterworks.

In the 14th and 15th centuries, German families founded settlements such as Zamarstyniv (Johann Sommerstein, 1387/1389), Klöpperhof (Klöppers, 1419) and Holosko (Nikolaus Zimmermann, 1402). In 1426, the settlement Holtbergof (Kulparkow) is mentioned for the first time. In the 15th and 16th centuries, many German families became Polish. Among them were the Scholtsy-Wolfowicz, who owned houses on the market square, and the Gerburt family, who held high positions. The Abrekas had great weight in the magistrate's office. In the 1580s, the German merchant and traveler Martin Gruneweg worked in Lviv.

Besides the medieval estates, in the 15th and 16th centuries, there were German colonies in Klepariv, Zymna Voda, Prusy, Sokilnyky and Chyshky. These settlements, based on the Magdeburg Law, were eventually polonized.

=== Poles ===
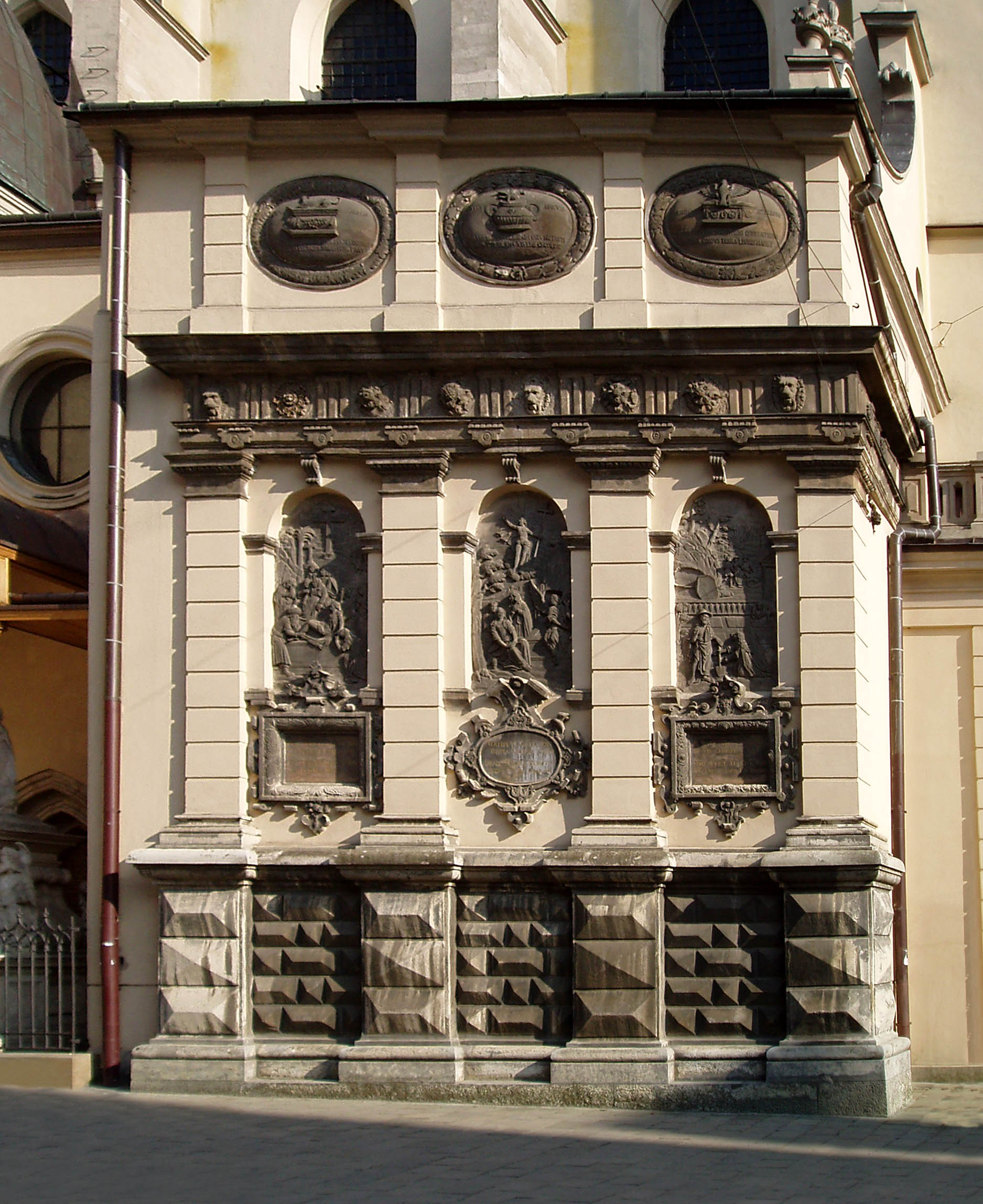
Campian Chapel at the Latin Cathedral

In the 15th and 16th centuries in Lviv, the Poles gradually displaced the Germans, who made up the majority of the immigrants. If in the first third of the 15th century, Germans made up 70–80% of the new citizens, by the middle of the 16th century their share dropped to 6%. Poles began to dominate at this time, as evidenced by the fact that from 1415 a Polish preacher appeared in the Latin Cathedral. Polonization increased after the capture of Constantinople by the Ottomans, which undermined the position of Germans and Armenians. In the first half of the 16th century Poles became burgomasters, and by the middle of the century Lviv had become a predominantly Polish city.

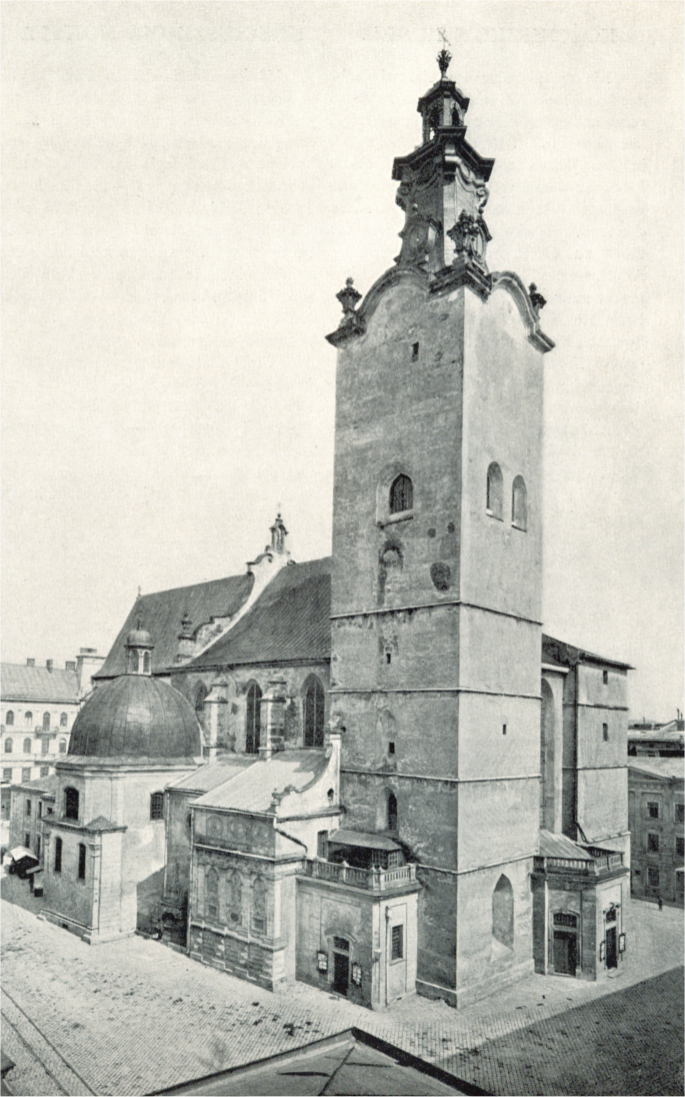
Latin Cathedral

In 1544, out of 263 built plots, 94 belonged to Poles, and in 1583 their share in the Galician suburb was 84%. The Polonization of the Germans took place through intermarriage, and they assimilated quickly. Poles and Polonized Germans became the majority in the surrounding villages. Among the influential Polish families were the Odrowąży, Chodecki, Jaroslawski, Fredro and others.

=== Jews ===
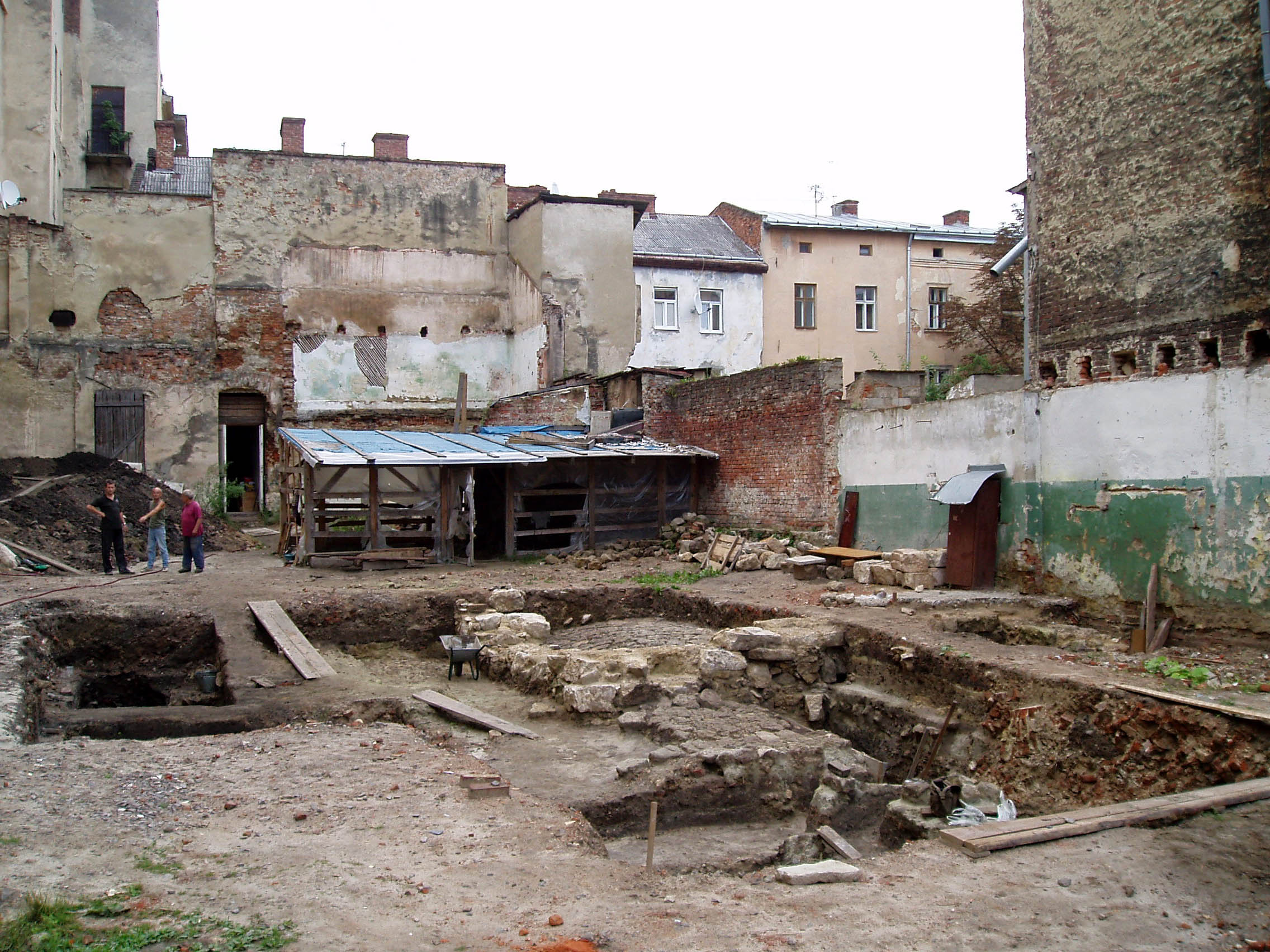
The ancient synagogue ruins

The first Jews settled in Lviv during the princely period and were under the protection of the prince. After Casimir III annexed Czerwona Rus' to Poland, the first Jewish community was established in Lviv. In 1356, Casimir granted the Jews the right of internal jurisdiction and a number of trade privileges. Since the 14th century, there were two communities: in the central district and in the Krakow suburb, which had synagogues, hospitals, schools and other buildings. (Note: It seems that the first Jews migrated from the cities of the Kievan Rus' destroyed by the Mongols and formed the basis of the suburban community, while the later central suburban community was formed from the Jews of Central and Western Europe.) The common cemetery was first mentioned in 1411 (today's Krakow Market).

The Jewish quarter was located in the south-eastern part of the city. Since 1387, it was mentioned as Jewish Street, where in 1528 there were 27 houses. A fire in 1571 destroyed the quarter, but it began to be rebuilt. In 1367, a charter of Casimir III secured the autonomy of the Jewish community. Some Jews moved to the suburbs of Krakow, while others tried to buy real estate in the city, which caused resistance from the magistrate.

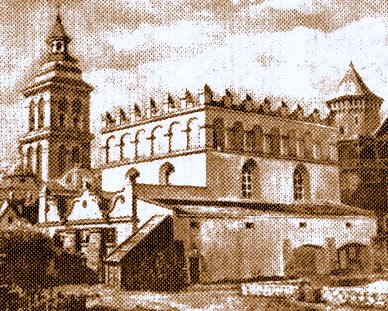
Golden Rose Synagogue

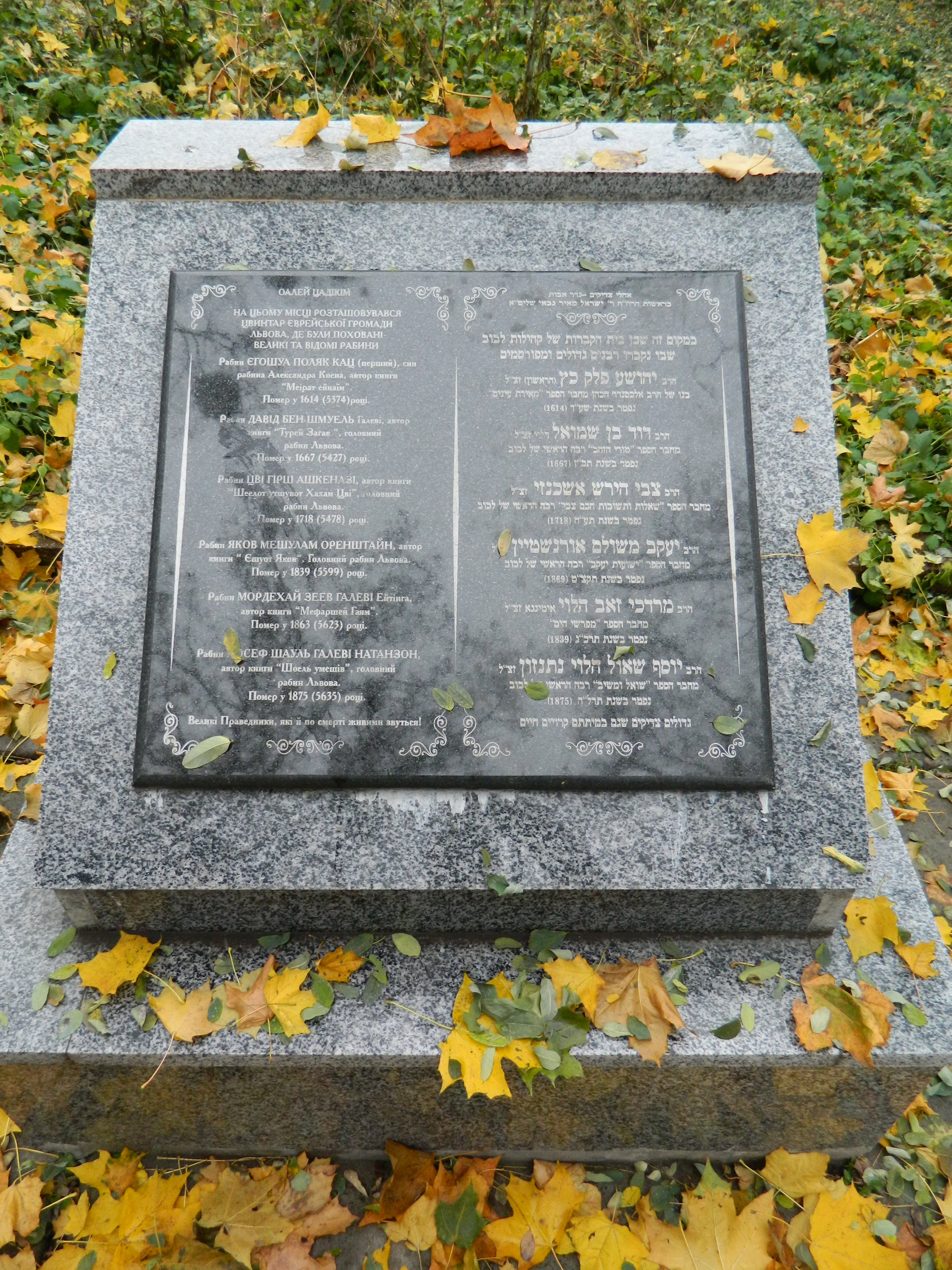
Memorial sign on the site of the old Jewish cemetery

Jews had no city rights and were not included in the shops. At the beginning of the 16th century, their presence was recorded in 25 towns in the Ruthenian and Belz provinces. In the 16th century, rabbis and elders met annually in congresses that performed judicial functions. In 1538 there were 42 Jews in 27 houses in the central district and 36 in the suburbs. In the 40s of the 16th century the number of Jews reached 8% of the population of Lviv, in 1550 there were more than 900.

In the second half of the 16th century, Jews became the second largest ethnic group in the city. In the third quarter of the 16th century, about 1.5–3 thousand Jews lived in Lviv, and by the end of the century — up to 4 thousand (about 20% of the population). They played an important role in trade with the Ottoman Empire, were engaged in lending and renting estates. In 1493, Jan I Olbracht restricted their trading rights, but Alexander Jagiellonczyk restored them in 1503 and 1506. Sigismund I changed their status several times, and in 1581 and 1592 agreements were made between the Jewish community and the magistrate.

In 1582, the Golden Rose Synagogue was built at the expense of the banker Isaac Nachmanowicz, and in 1590 a yeshiva was founded. In the 16th century, Jews settled in Podzamcza and in the suburbs of Krakow. The Lviv Jewish community achieved a large degree of autonomy, although it remained isolated. The Lviv Hagal was subordinate to the Vaad of the Four Lands, which united the Hagals of Poland. Jews also settled in the surrounding townships, where they engaged in trade, handicrafts, and leased land. The Karaites of Lviv were numerically inferior to the Karaites of Halych.

=== Armenians ===
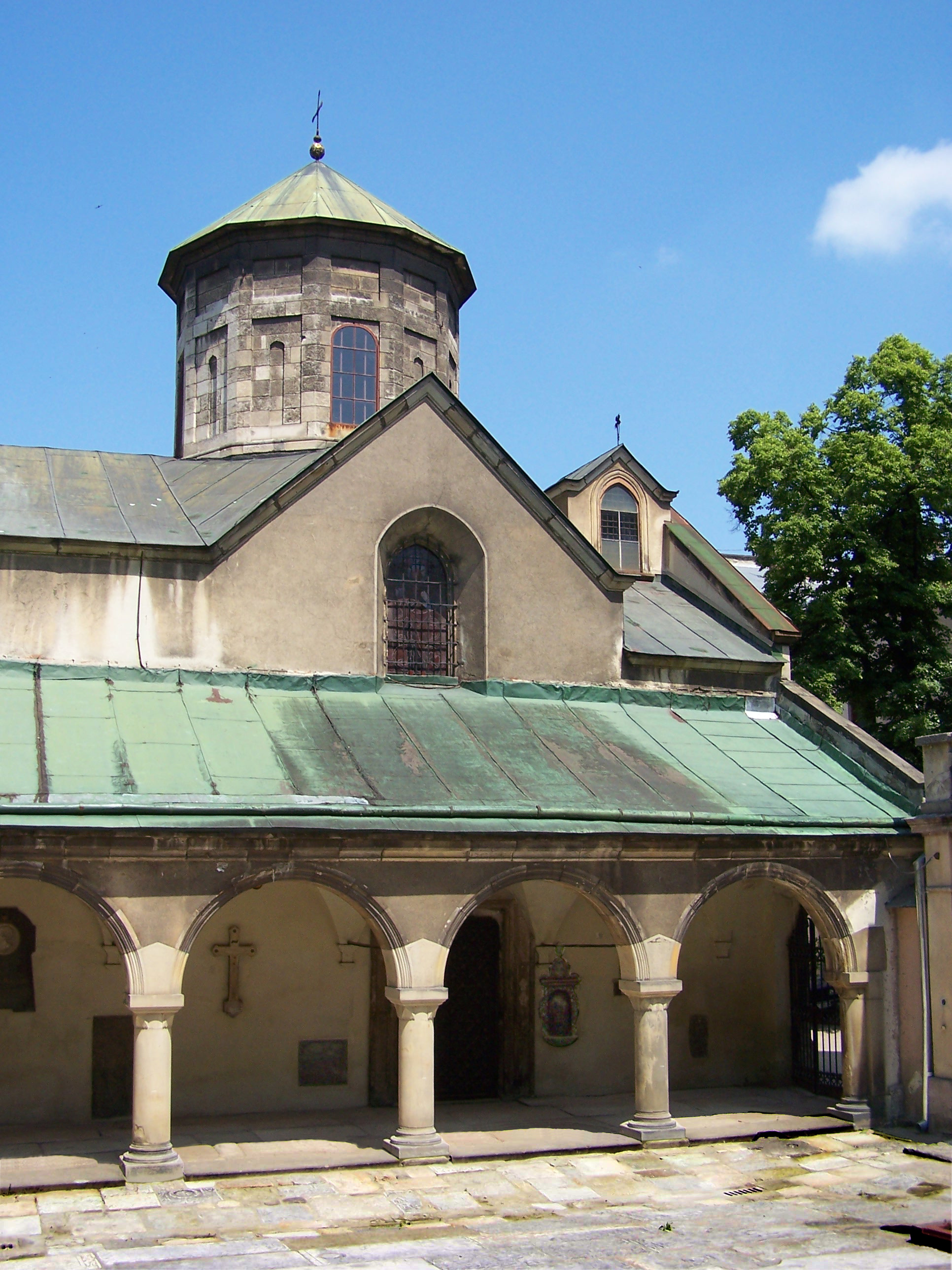
Armenian Cathedral

Armenian merchants and craftsmen who came to Lviv from the Crimea in the second half of the 13th century settled in the Pidzamche district, where they built the Church of St. Anne and the Monastery of St. Jacob. The Armenians lived in a closed community, settled their affairs within their own circle, and rarely intermarried with members of other communities.

In 1356, the Armenian community received the right to have its own wójt and autonomous judicial bodies (confirmed in 1379, 1387, 1434 and 1440). The royal charter of 1367 secured religious freedoms, and the first Armenian bishop Grigoris established a residence in Lviv. In 1371, the Armenians received the Church of St. John the Baptist. In 1377, the Armenian Mardrus sold the village of Malehov to the Ruthenians.

In the second half of the 14th century and the first half of the 15th century, the Armenians were the second largest community in the Middle Empire after the Germans. In the last quarter of the 14th century, a significant wave of Armenians arrived from Cilicia. The owners of the houses in the Armenian quarter (mentioned in 1394) sold them only to co-religionists, which preserved the integrity of the enclave.

Since the time of Casimir III, Armenians lived compactly on Virmenska Street. In 1407, up to 300 Armenians lived within the city walls, in 1416 — more than 400. In 1417, they made up more than a quarter of the 1280 citizens. In 1462, the Armenian wójt of Lviv received independence from the city court, and merchants — privileges on payment of customs duties. At the end of the 15th century, the position of wójt was abolished, but the Armenian court (khutz) existed until the end of the 18th century.

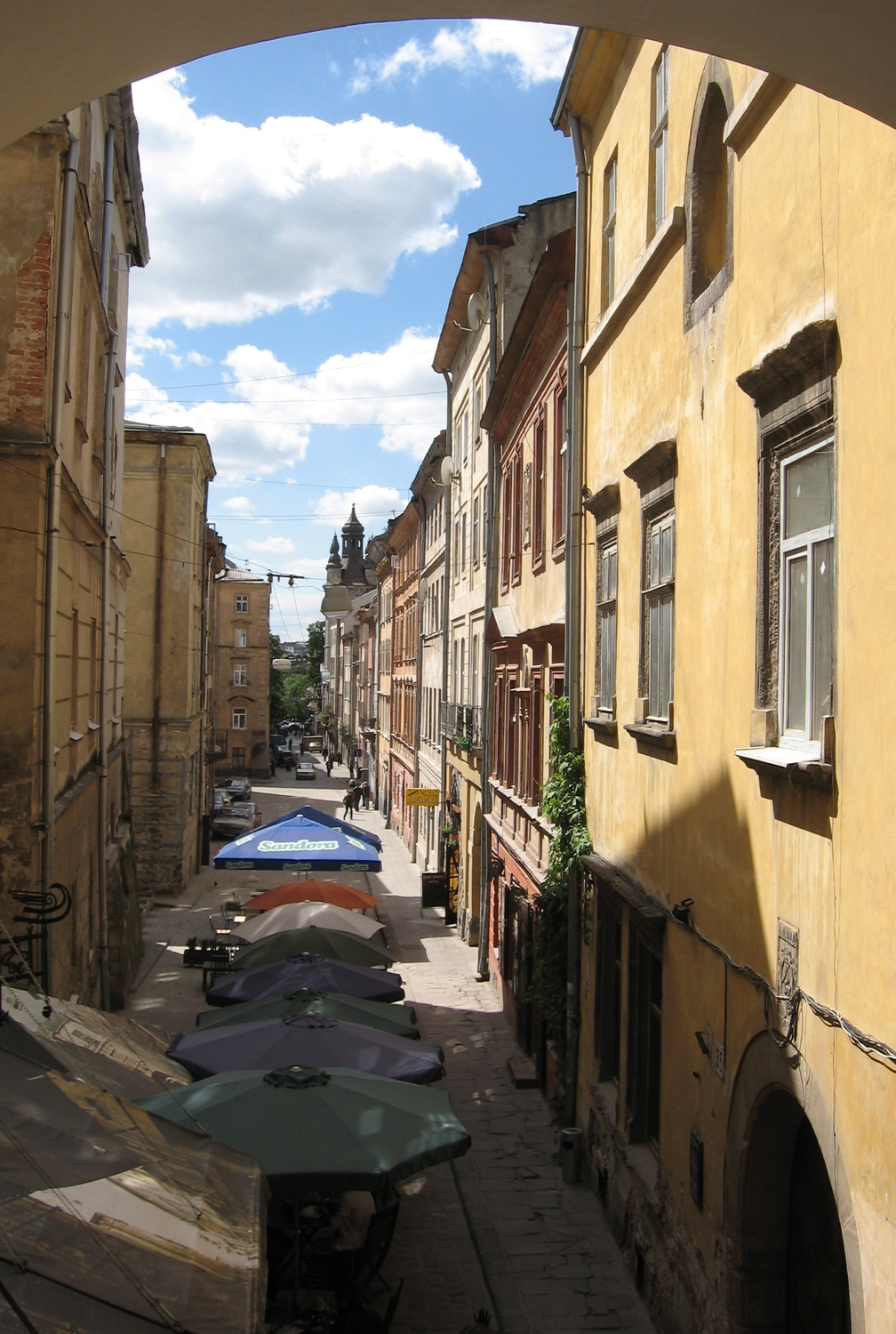
Virmenska Street

In the last quarter of the 15th century, many Armenians arrived in Lviv from Ottoman Cafa, Suceava and Asia Minor. They did not polonize due to the influx of immigrants and integration into trade with the Ottoman Empire and Iran.

In 1519, Sigismund I approved the charter of the Armenians according to the Lawcode of Mkhitar Gosh. In 1575, there were about 60 Armenian families living in the city. The community was led by a council of elders (6 members until 1563, then 12), which decided all internal matters. In 1578, the Armenians had almost equal rights with the Catholics, and in 1588 they owned 22 large shops.

Wealthy Armenian merchants controlled much of Lviv's eastern trade with Poland, acting as intermediaries between Poland and the Ottoman Empire. In the 16th century, Lviv became the center of the Levantine silk trade. Among the wealthy Armenian families were the Augustinovichi, Torosovichi, Serebkovichi, Ivashkevichi, Nikorovichi, Bertanovichi, Golubovichi, Donovakovovichi, and Vartanovichi.

In addition to merchants, Armenians were artisans: weavers, goldsmiths, tanners, leather workers, shoemakers, furriers, gunsmiths, and others. Their shops were famous for imported Oriental goods. Famous artists were Pavel Bogush and his son Shimon Bogushovich.

At the end of the 16th century, 1.5–2.8 thousand Armenians (12–14% of the population) lived in Lviv. They owned about 80 houses in the central district, 280 houses in the Krakow suburb. There were large Armenian communities in the Pidzamche, St. John and Armenian Archbishop's districts.

=== Greeks ===
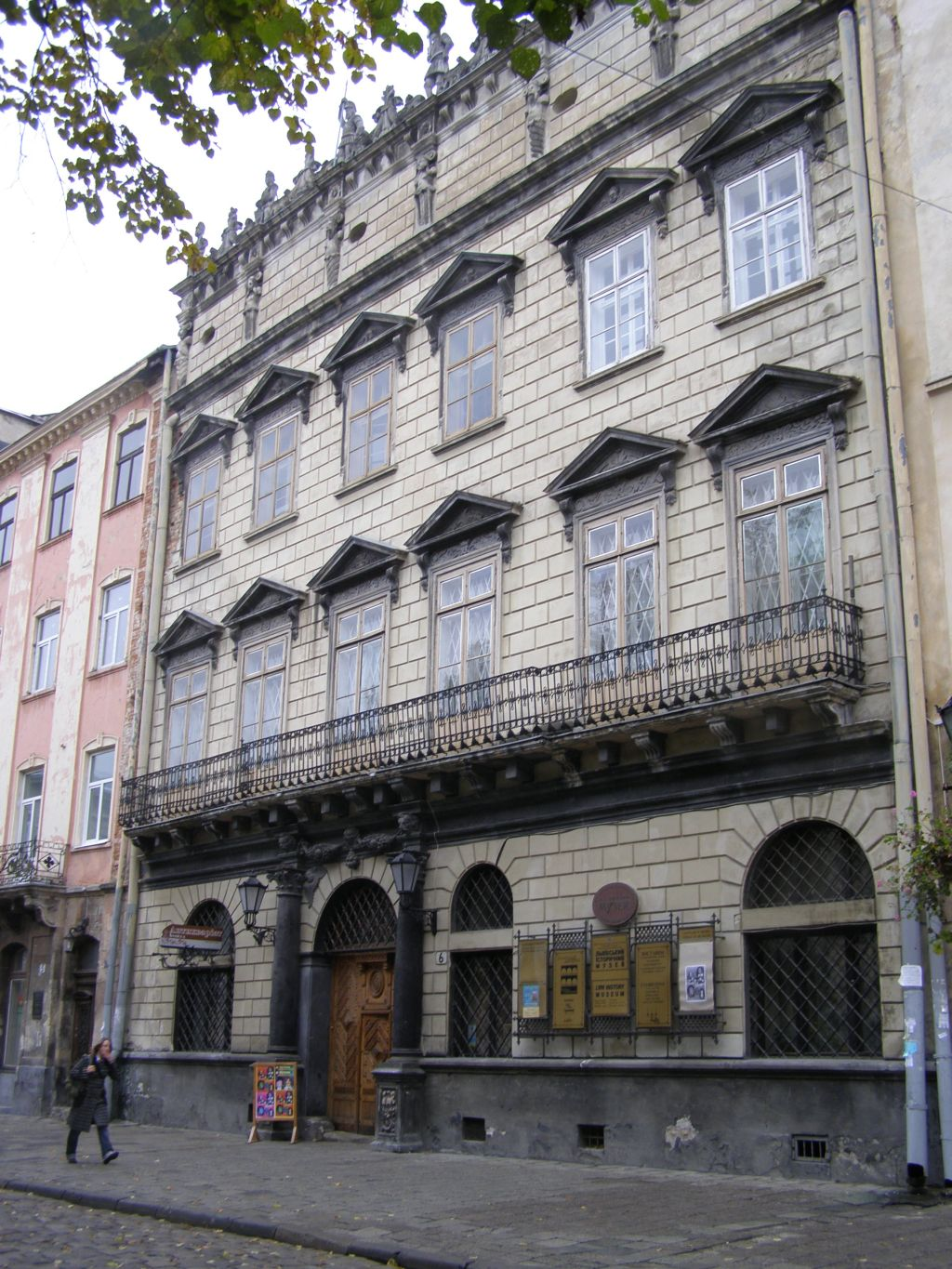
Korniakt Palace

The Greek community in Lviv began to form in the second half of the 14th century (the activity of the first Greek merchant in the city is documented in 1382). Greeks settled in Lviv mainly from colonies in the Crimea, Moldavia, Crete and Corfu. They actively competed with Armenians and Jews in the trade of Oriental goods (in particular, they imported wine and silk). With their large financial resources, the Greeks quickly gained the patronage of royal officials and magistrates.

Ruska Street was the center of the community, there the Orthodox citizens settled. In the 16th century, Greeks concentrated the wine trade in Lviv and a large part of the Polish Kingdom in their hands, were engaged in renting the city customs and paying royal duties. At the same time, some of them actively influenced the political relations between Poland, Moldavia, the Russian Tsardom and the Ottoman Empire. In the second half of the 16th century the richest Greek families of Lviv (Korniakty, Alvizia, Marinetos, Afendiki, Mazaraki, Langisha) actively participated in the Orthodox movement and financed the Brotherhood of the Dormition. However, they remained an insignificant minority in the Brotherhood and never had much influence on the adoption of fundamental decisions. In the 80s of the 16th century, there were 32 Greeks living in Lviv (not counting the merchants who came for a short time). In 1597, the Cretan merchants Baptiste and Constantine Vevelli settled in Lviv. Although Greeks were in a better position than Ruthenians, they also experienced some restrictions in accepting citizenship and buying real estate in the medieval municipality.

=== Italians ===
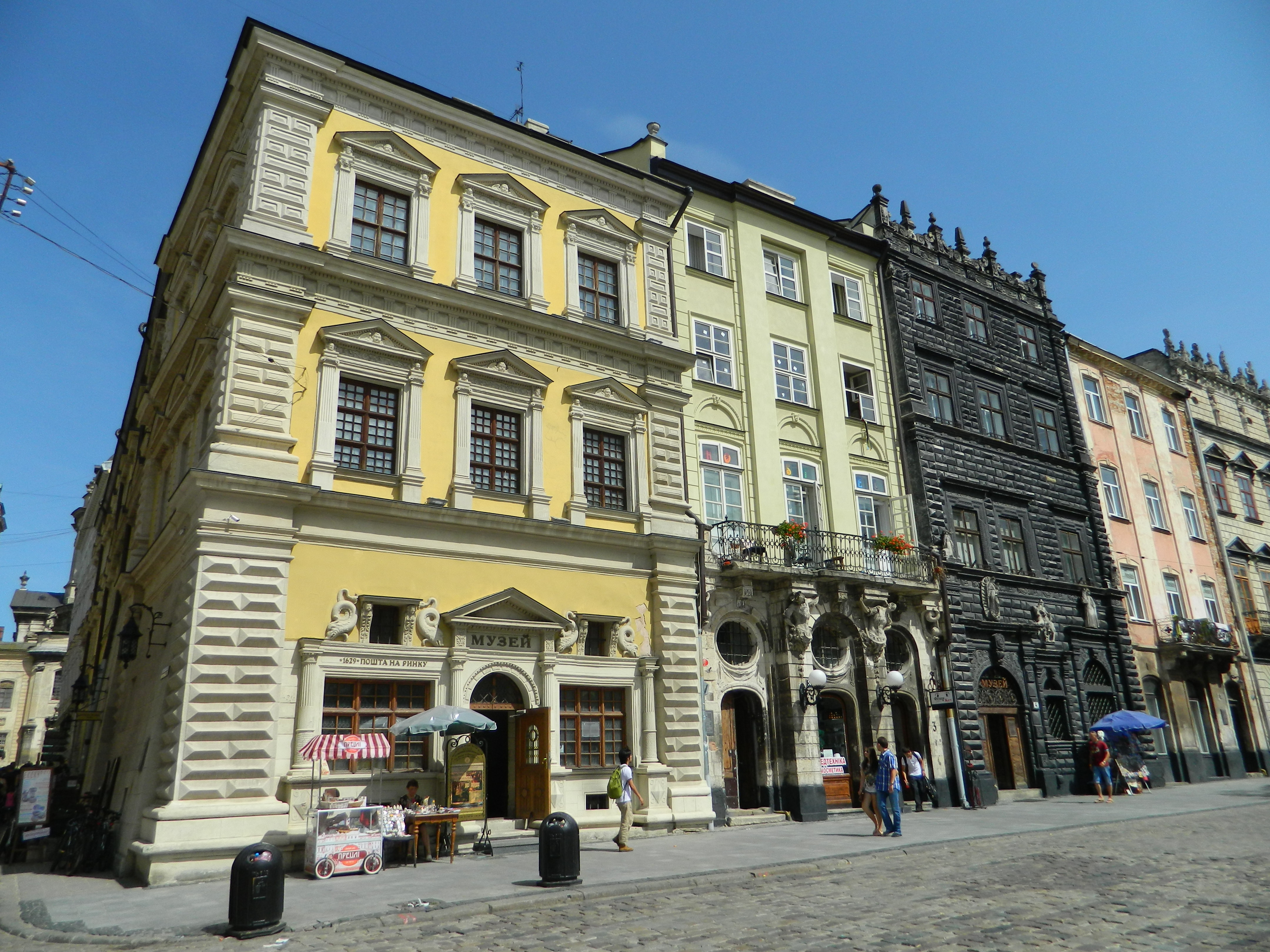
Bandinelli Palace

The first Italians appeared in Lviv at the beginning of the 15th century, which was facilitated by the trade relations of Galicia with the Genoese colonies in the Crimea and Italian cities (Venice, Florence and Rome), as well as the cultural contacts of Lviv with Italian university centers (Bologna and Padua). Archival documents from 1406 mention a case of sending money (one hundred gold pieces) from Lviv to Rome, and in 1409, the Italian Francesco de Cantello from Cafa received Lviv citizenship. In the first half of the 15th century, many Italians settled in Lviv, who were engaged in international trade, financial transactions, and also represented the interests of rich Genoese and Florentine dynasties. Italians bought houses and estates in the suburbs, owned warehouses and shops, donated money to decorate altars in churches.

Several generations of the Lviv branch of the Florentine Ubaldini dynasty belonged to the upper class of the city. Wealthy Italians kept secular salons through which Western European culture, music, and literature entered Lviv, decorated buildings, courtyards, and fountains in the Mediterranean style, and built firewalls in the city. Merchants traded in expensive imported fabrics and also provided services for shipping goods and correspondence to Europe. The second largest group of Italians after merchants were architects, who came to Lviv after the fire of 1527. To them the city owes a special architectural style that combined the late Renaissance and local traditions.

=== Others ===
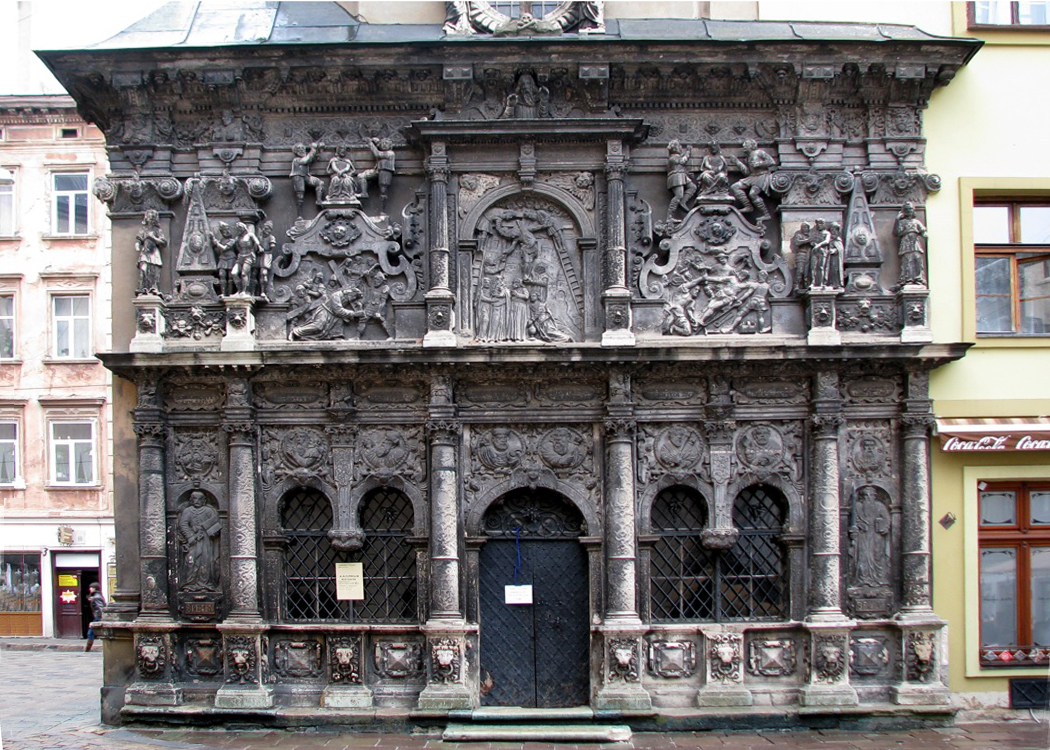
The Boim Chapel facade

The first Hungarian settlers appeared in Lviv in 1370–1387, when the city was under the control of Louis I and his daughter Maria. With the accession of Stefan Báthory to the Polish throne, several Hungarian families from Transylvania settled in Lviv, including the Boims. Jerzy Boim made his fortune in usury, wine, cloth and spice trade, then he was elected to the raice and burgomaster of Lviv. His descendants were also engaged in trade, became raisers, as well as howlers and court physicians of Polish kings.

Tatars lived next to Armenians, because they also came from Crimea and had cultural similarities with them. In Lviv, there were Tatar Gates, Tatar Street and Tatar Suburb (in the first half of the 15th century they were renamed to Kraków Gates, Krakivska Street and Krakivske Suburb). According to some reports, there used to be a Tatar mosque near the princely palace, but no archaeological evidence has been found. In 1403, the magistrate expelled the Tatars outside the city walls (only a few of their co-religionists remained in the medieval district). In the suburbs, the Tartars gradually accepted Christianity and intermarried with the majority of the inhabitants, while others left Lviv. The last mention of Tatars in Lviv dates back to 1509.

The ethnonym Saracens referred to all non-Christians except Jews (Arabs from the Levant, Polovtsians, Tatars, and Volga Bulgars). Sometimes Saracens were mistakenly called Karaites, Genoese from Surozh, and even Gypsies. In princely Lviv Saracens lived together with Jews and were mainly engaged in trade. In the Polish period, Saracens were most often meant to be Lviv Tatars.

In the 16th century, Lviv became home to a community of natives from the British Isles, who were mainly engaged in exporting grain to their homeland. At the end of the century, there were about 20 British merchants, mostly of Scottish origin (Pontis, Alland, Steyler, Eifle and others), many of whom had city rights.

== Religion ==
Religion was the basis of social division in medieval Lviv, creating barriers between the city's inhabitants of different confessions. Only Catholics could be full citizens of Polish Lviv. Even the Armenians, who were second in social status, were far inferior in rights to the Catholic patriciate. Even lower in the social hierarchy were the Orthodox Ruthenians and Jews.

=== Catholicism ===
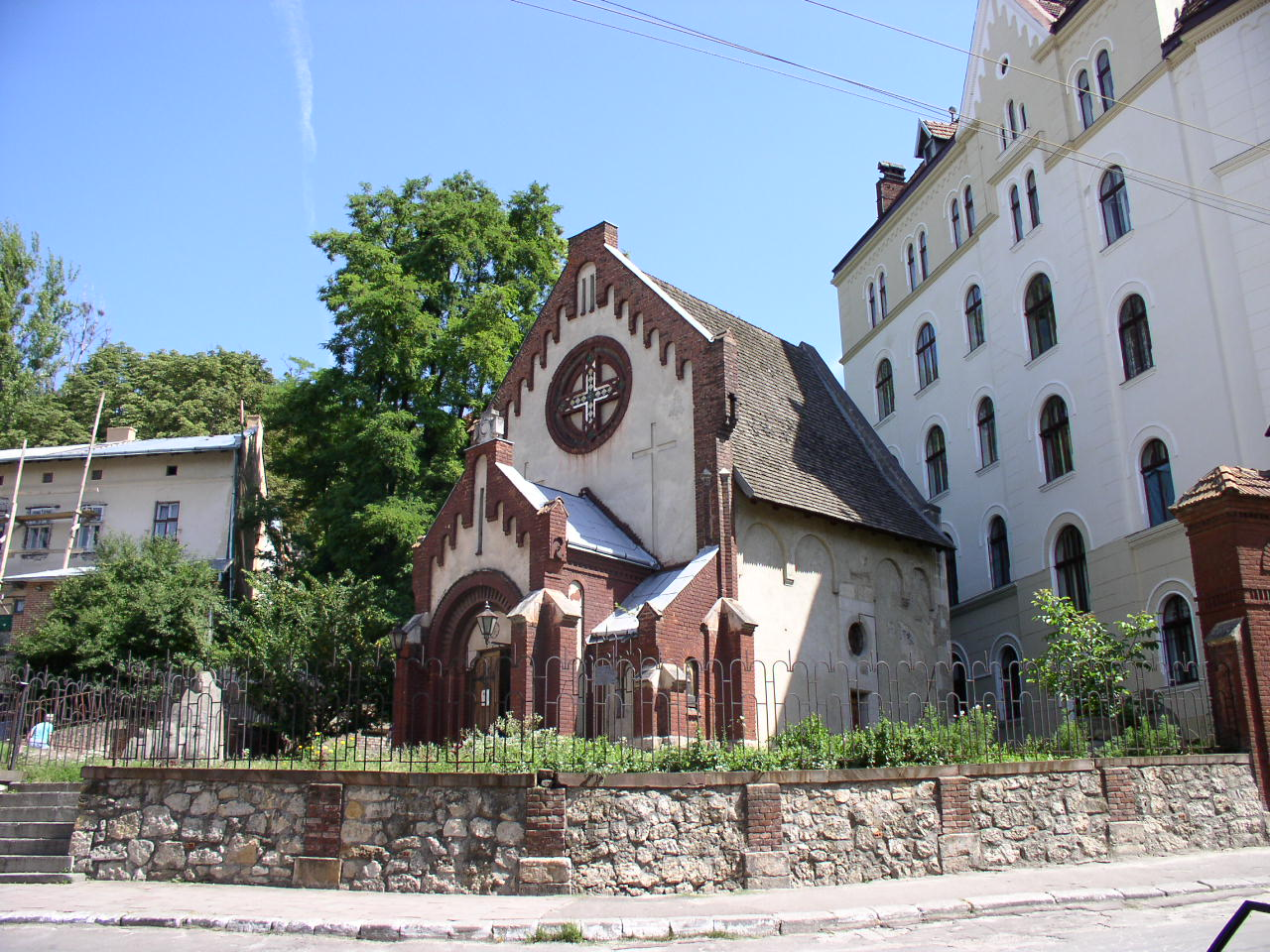
John the Baptist Church

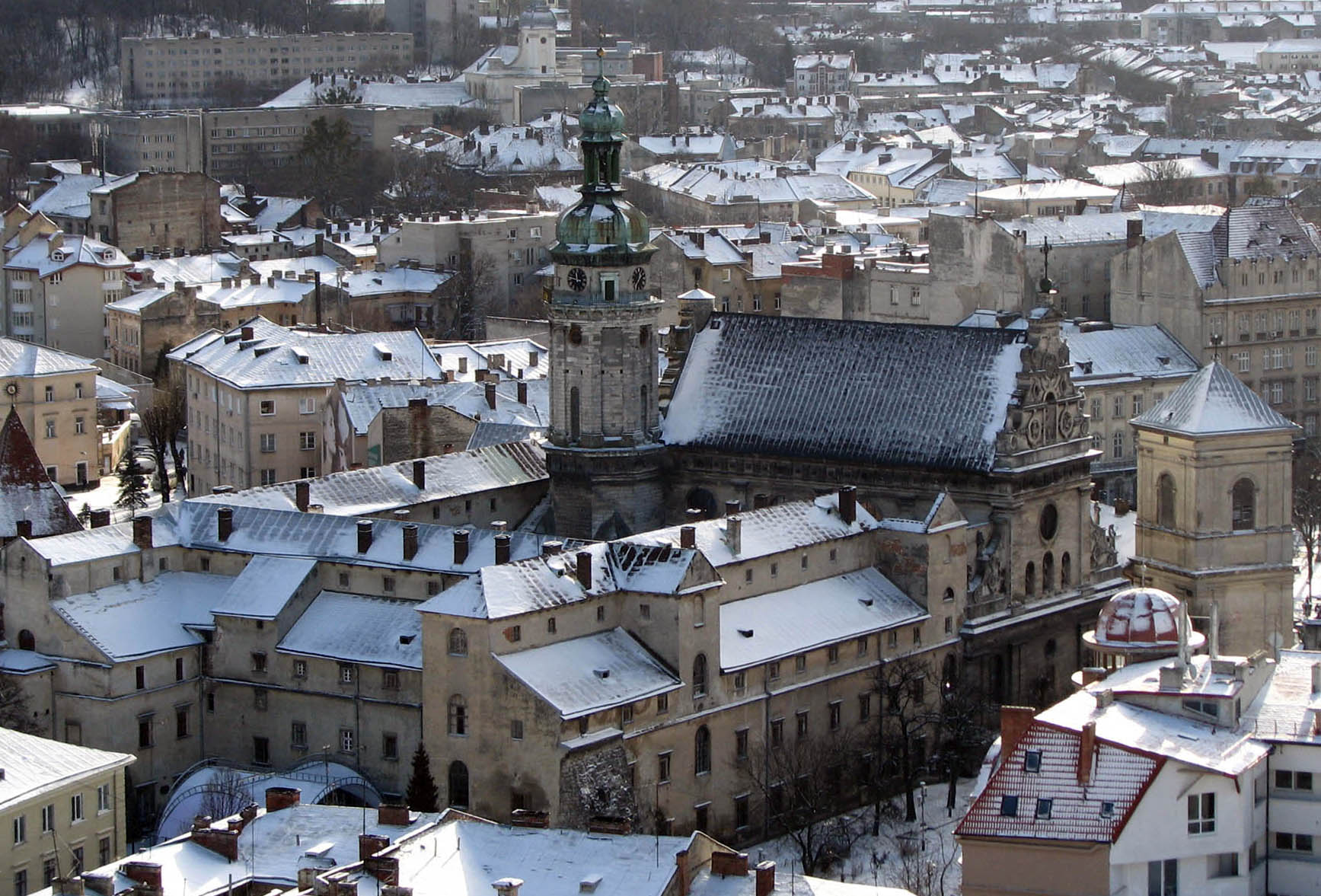
Bernardine church and monastery

Since the 13th century, Lviv attracted Catholic missionaries. In 1257, the Ruthenian lands came under the jurisdiction of Catholic bishops, and in 1359, on the initiative of King Casimir III, the Bishop of Lviv, Toma, was authorized.

During the Polish period, Catholics had privileges, while non-Catholics were restricted and lived in certain neighborhoods. The Magdeburg Law supported Catholics and promoted social restrictions for Ruthenians. By the mid-14th century, Lviv had become an important Catholic center.

Catholic monasteries and churches were built from 1360, and in 1375 the Metropolitanate of Galicia was established, prohibiting Orthodox bishops from serving in its territory. Catholic orders such as the Dominicans, Franciscans, and Jesuits played an important role in the life of the city.

Catholic brotherhoods were active in charity and spiritual life. Among the oldest are the brotherhoods of the Latin Cathedral, the Church of the St. Mary Snizhna, and others. In 1395 an agreement was reached by which the bishops of Lubusz renounced their claims to Ruthenia. In 1412, the cathedra was transferred to Lviv, and in 1429 a chapter was founded.

In the 1370s, a Dominican monastery was built in Lviv, and at the end of the 14th century, a Franciscan church. In 1460, a Bernardine monastery was founded, and in 1536, a church of St. Lawrence, which later became the Bonifatius monastery, was founded. The Benedictine monastery was founded in 1596. Conflicts between the various trades, including artists, led to a schism, and in 1596, the Ruthenian masters were excluded from the Catholic workshops.

=== Orthodoxy ===
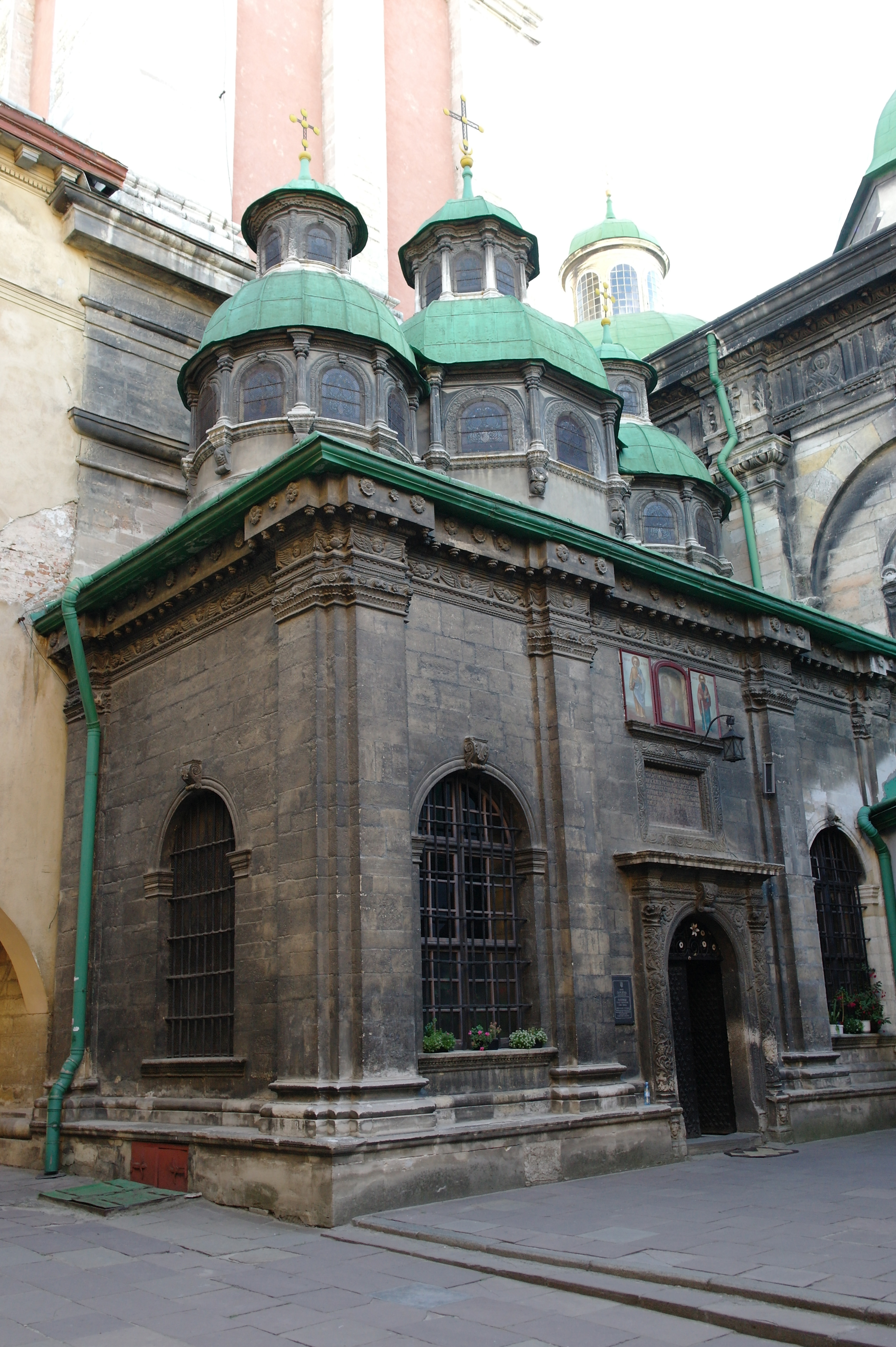
Chapel of the Three Saints

In the 13th and 14th centuries, Orthodoxy was the dominant confession in Lviv. In 1539 the cathedra of the Metropolis of Halych was moved to Lviv and Makarius of Tuchap became its bishop. In 1540, he was consecrated, and in 1539–1560, a new Church of the Dormition of the Theotokos was built according to the project of Peter the Italian. In 1591, the construction of the fourth church began, which is still preserved today.

Orthodox brotherhoods, such as the Dormition Brotherhood (1586), engaged in charity and education, actively defended the civil rights of the Ruthenian community, and fought against the Union of Brest. At the end of the 16th century, the Dormition Brotherhood, which had the status of a stauropegium, came into conflict with the Orthodox Bishop Gedeon.

St. George's Cathedral, founded around 1280, became an important center of Orthodoxy. From 1539 it was the cathedral of the Bishop of Lviv. St. Onuphrius Monastery, founded in the 15th century, was also an important center of Orthodoxy.

Orthodox churches faced restrictions, including a ban on the use of bells on certain days and the obligation to pay for the right to ring bells at funerals.

=== Armenian Church ===
In 1363, a cathedral was built at the expense of rich Armenian merchants, and next to it — the palace of the archbishop. In 1364, the Catholicos Mesrop I founded in Lviv the diocese of the Armenians of Ruthenia, Moldavia and Wallachia and appointed Grigory the Archbishop. In January 1367, Tsar Casimir III approved the existence of the diocese by his decree and granted religious freedom to the Armenians. The Armenian archbishop was the first ecclesiastical leader to settle in Lviv (Catholic and Orthodox archbishops later established their residences in the city).

The Lviv parish, headed by an Avakere, had an Armenian school, a hospital, and several fraternities; the priests of the parish took care of the Armenian cemetery. Under the leadership of the Archbishop or the Avakeres of Lviv, a court met, which included representatives of the council of elders of the community. They also elected the Armenian Archbishop, who was then approved by the Catholicos, controlled the property and income of the Church, and paid salaries to the Archbishop and priests. At the end of the 16th century there was a small community of Armenian nuns in the Church of the Holy Cross in the suburbs of Krakow.

=== Judaism ===
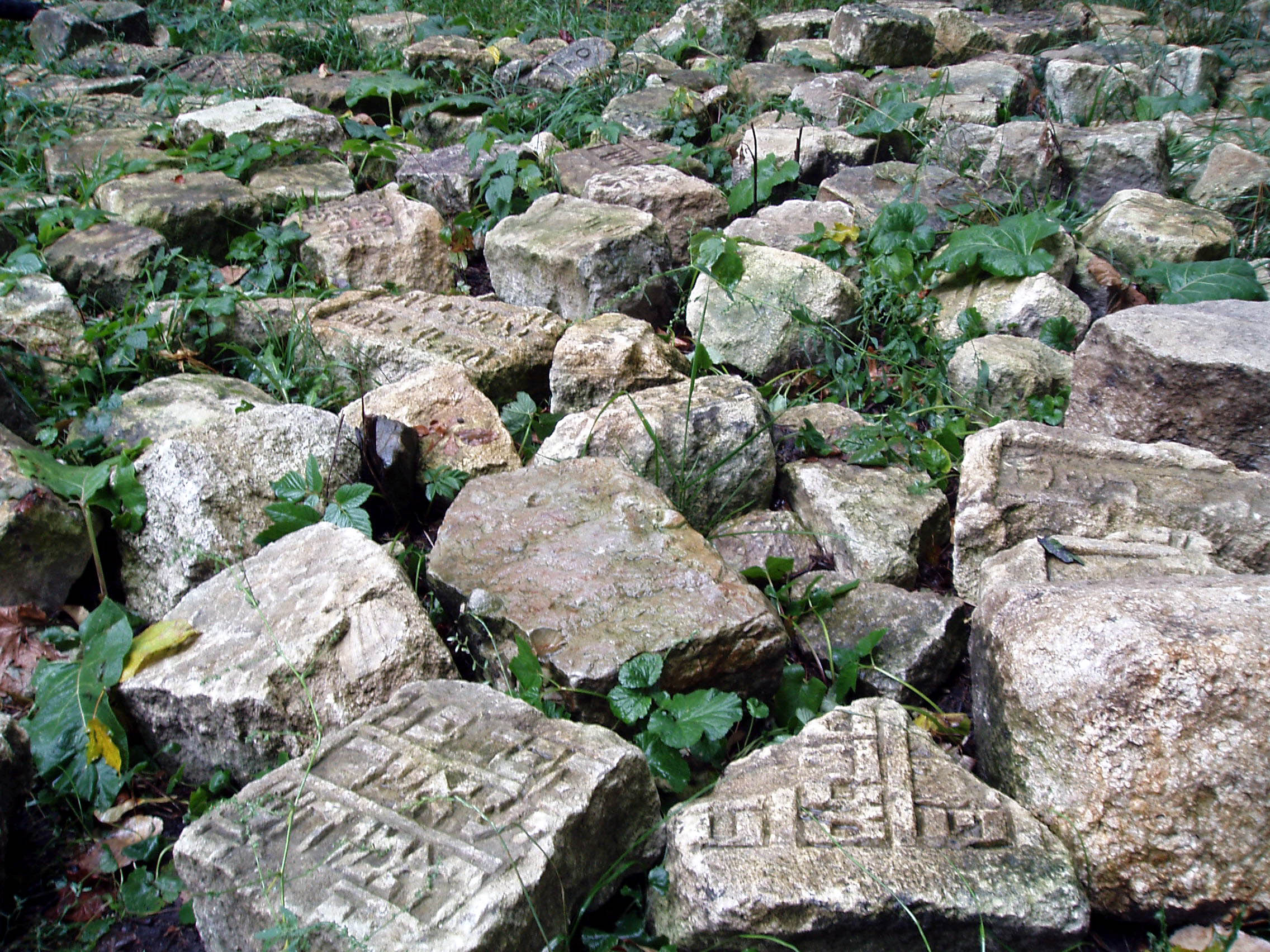
Remains of tombstones from an old Jewish cemetery

There were several synagogues in medieval Lviv, which belonged to two separate Jewish communities: the city synagogue (located in the Jewish quarter of the medieval district) and the suburban synagogue (located in the Krakow suburb). At the beginning of the 15th century, a synagogue was built or reconstructed on Yevreiska Street (now Fedorova 29), from which wooden beams with Hebrew inscriptions were found in 1906. In the first half of the 15th century, the synagogue on Jewish Street is mentioned, which was patronized by the rich tax collector Volchko or Ze'ev (he paid the debts of King Vladyslaus II Jagiello to the Lviv magistrate and financed the preparations for the Battle of Grunwald). It is not clear whether it was one and the same synagogue or two different temples located on adjacent plots. Another old synagogue was located near the Jewish Tower (the southern part of the city walls in the area of today's Brativ Rohatyntsiv Street). In 1555 a stone synagogue in the Gothic style was built on Bydliacha Street (now Staroievreiska Street) (under the Austrians in 1800 the Great City Synagogue was built in its place). In 1582–1595, the Renaissance Golden Rose (or Nachmanowicz) Synagogue was built under the direction of Pavel Lucky. Apparently, it was built on the site of the old Wolczek Synagogue. The Synagogue of the Krakow Suburbs or the Great Suburb Synagogue was also founded in the 15th century, rebuilt several times, and at the beginning of the 17th century it was already a stone synagogue (today the square on Sianska Street stands in its place).

== Culture ==
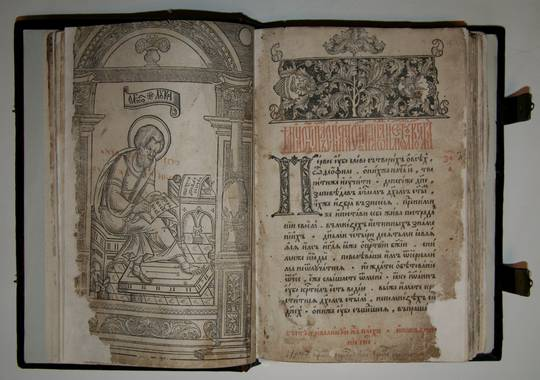
Ivan Fyodorov's Apostle in Lviv

The culture of medieval Lviv, incorporating elements of Ruthenian and Polish culture, reached a high level. Painting (especially icon painting) and the art of illuminated manuscripts, architecture and sculpture developed considerably, but many monuments of material and spiritual culture were destroyed during frequent foreign invasions and feuds. Lviv was one of the centers of the written language development: chronicles were written and preserved here. The high level of culture is evidenced by the preserved icon of the Mother of God from the Onuphrius Monastery.

In the second half of the 15th century, the first printing press in Lviv existed for a short time in the Onuphrius Monastery. In 1573, with the help of Lviv citizens and the abbot of the Onuphrius Monastery, printing was revived by Ivan Fyodorov, who founded a printing house on Krakowska Street (here he printed the second edition of the Apostle and Primer in 1574). After Fyodorov's death (1583), the printing house fell into the hands of Jewish merchants, and from 1590, with the financial support of Orthodox Bishop Gedeon, it continued to operate under the Lviv Brotherhood (the first editions were the letters of Patriarch Jeremiah II and the Council of Bishops, as well as a collection of church verses).

In 1578, together with King Stephen Báthory, the marching printing press of the royal chancellery came to Lviv for five months and published several universals, a panegyric by Jan Kochanowski, and a collection of sermons in Latin and Polish. Pawel Szczerbic, a Krakow lawyer who took over the position of Lviv's syndic and received the royal printing privilege, published a code of city law in Polish in 1581. In 1592, Maciej Garvolin, a Krakow printer who settled in Lviv, published two Latin panegyrics by Szymon Szymonowic and a textbook of Latin grammar; after his death, Maciej Bernat bought the printing house.

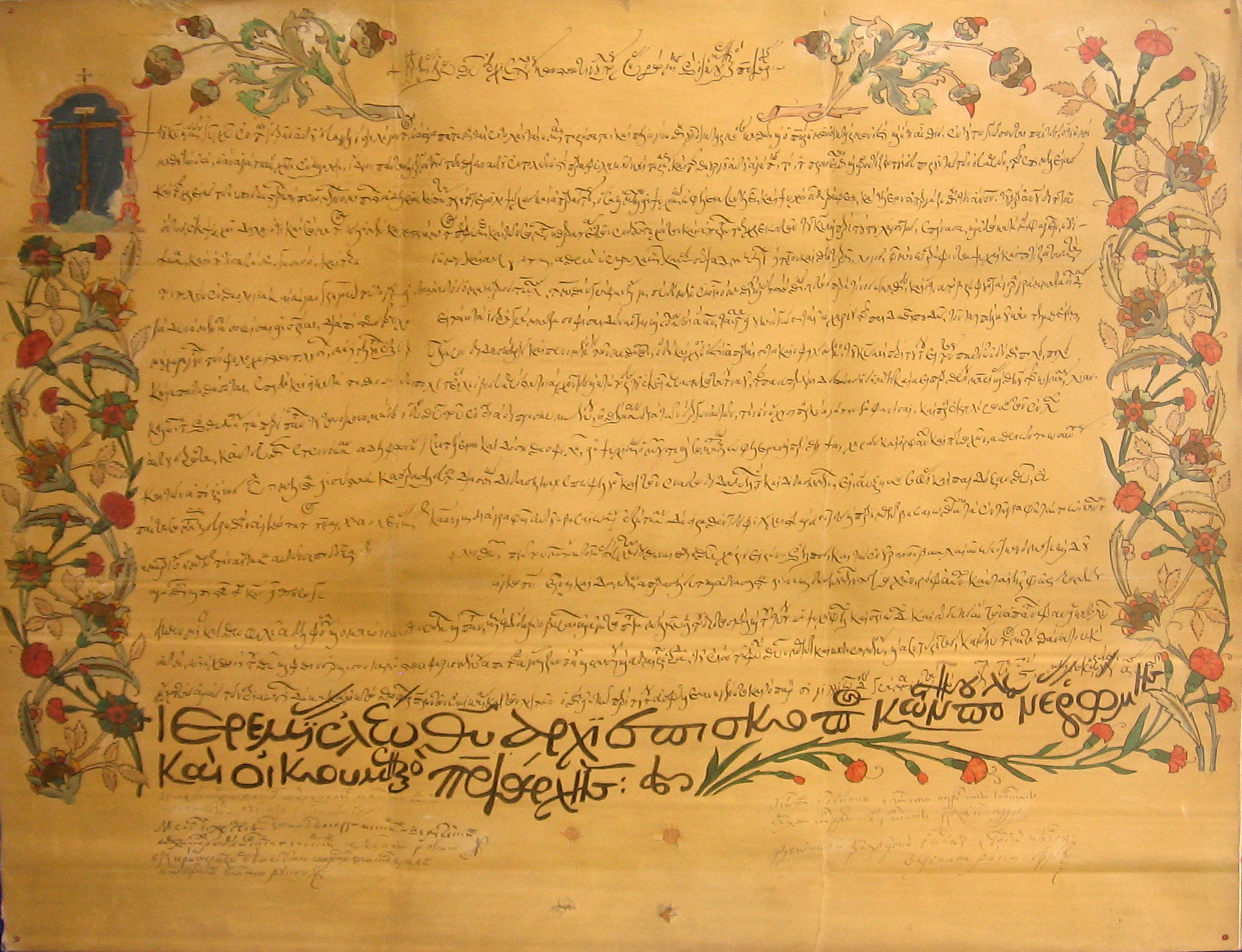
Letter of the Patriarch of Antioch on the granting of the Stavropigia to the Lviv Brotherhood

In the first half of the 16th century, an Orthodox brotherhood was established in the Church of the Dormition of the Theotokos on Ruska Street. In 1586, the brotherhood received a charter from the Patriarch of Antioch, Joachim V, and was soon granted the status of a stavropigion. The Lviv Dormition Brotherhood, which fought against Catholic oppression, became the cultural center of the city's Orthodox community. The Brotherhood organized a printing press and a school that taught Church Slavonic, Greek and Latin. Around the Brotherhood and the school gathered prominent people of their time: theologians and teachers Cyril Tranquillion-Stavrovetsky, Arsenius Elassonsky, Job Boretsky, Stefan and Lavrentiy Zizanyi, John Vishensky, translators and scholars Pamvo Berynda, Gavriil Dorofeyevich and Tarasiy Zemka, publisher Fyodor Balaban, rich bourgeois Konstantin Korniakt, Yuriy Rogatinets and his brother Ivan. In the autumn of 1591, the grammar Adelphotes compiled in the school was published.

There were also Orthodox brotherhoods and brotherhood schools in the suburbs of Lviv. For example, in Podzamcha there was the Brotherhood of the Annunciation (1542) and the Brotherhood of St. Nicholas (1544). The oldest educational institution was the school of the Annunciation Brotherhood in the Galician suburb. There was a large library, where the works of ancient authors, Western European humanists and Slavic writers of that time were kept. The archives of the Brotherhood contained many valuable manuscripts on history and philosophy.

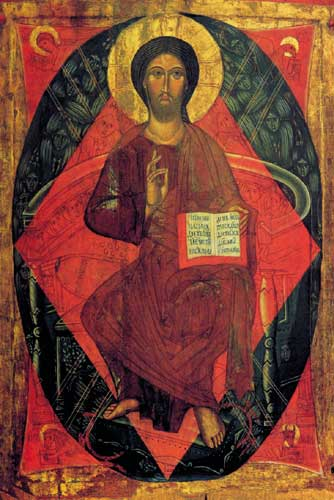
Galician icon of the second half of the 15th century

Medieval Lviv was famous for its libraries, which first appeared in monasteries and churches. One of the oldest libraries, containing about a thousand volumes, was located in the Armenian Archbishopric. Since the second half of the 14th century, the Catholic Cathedral Library has been known (the collection was divided into four parts: Cathedral, Metropolitan, Preachers and Vicars). The Catholic cathedral school, which had its own library since the end of the 14th century. One of the oldest was the library of the Bernardine monastery (it was also one of the best libraries of Lviv in the 15th–16th centuries).

In 1551, the construction of a book depository in the Dominican monastery began. In 1579, the first documentary mention of the monastery library in the church of St. Onuphrius (the collection of an older library, which existed in the church of St. Yuri, was also kept here). In the same year, the first list of books of the library of the Dormition Brotherhood, which was regularly replenished with gifts from the brothers (this library was of a closed type, its collection could be used only by members of the Brotherhood). In 1596, the first director of the library founded by Archbishop Jan-Dimitr Solikovsky was appointed, which was soon taken over by the Jesuit College (the books in it were replenished both by donations and by novelties of the Jesuit College printing house). The Lviv magistrate had a small library, mostly collections of laws and royal statutes. In addition, many private individuals had collections of books in their estates (many Lviv archbishops were famous for their personal libraries, as were canons, school rectors, and rich patricians among lawyers, doctors, pharmacists, and city officials).

In princely times, icon painting existed in the Orthodox churches and monasteries of Lviv, but for various reasons the oldest icons of Lviv have not been preserved (fires, seizure of the city by foreigners, repairs of churches and iconostases "contributed" to this). In the last quarter of the 14th century the artist John worked in Lviv, and in 1495, the artist Prokop of Marmarosh received the city charter.

The oldest preserved icons of the Lviv school are the 15th century icon of the Virgin Hodegetria from the Church of St. Paraskeva in the village of Krasov and the icon of the Savior from the Church of the Virgin Mary in the village of Remenov. Among the Lviv artists of the 16th century, archival materials mention Andrei Rusin and Lavrin Puchal. Lviv artists were part of a joint workshop with goldsmiths and konvisars (craftsmen who made products from tin), they painted not only icons and pictures, but also decorated books, painted various items for household, domestic and military purposes. The shop artists had the monopoly right to manufacture and market their products within the city jurisdiction.

In the 16th century, the Orthodox Ukrainians dominated among the Lviv painters (artists), and they outnumbered the Catholic painters in quantity and quality of works. However, due to harassment by the workshops, the Ruthenians were forced to move from the city to the suburbs. The impetus for the activation of Ukrainian artists was the establishment of an Orthodox bishopric in Lviv in 1539. Since many Ruthenian artists also worked in churches, the Catholics organized their own separate workshop in 1595-1597.

Gothic had a great influence on painting and sculpture of the Lviv school. The flat Gothic sculpture includes the seal of Prince Yuriy Lvivych (the beginning of the 14th century), the seal of the city community with the coat of arms of Lviv and the image of the tower (14th century) and the seal of the magistrate with the coat of arms and the image of the gate (1353). Gothic elements are present in the 14th century Dominican icon of the Virgin Hodegetria (now in the Gdañsk Church), in the 15th century, New Testament Trinity with the Donor and the double-sided painting from the Latin Cathedral Crucifixion with the Martyrs of the Legion of Thebes — Removal from the Cross (both works are kept in the Lviv Art Gallery), in the early 16th century icon Crucifixion with the Standing (kept in the National Museum in Lviv). The Gothic influence is also noticeable in the painting of the Armenian church (late 15th - early 16th century).

In the left nave of the former church of St. Nicholas is the Scholz-Wolfowicz altar (1595) made of black marble and alabaster. This work by Hermann van Gutte was taken from the Latin Cathedral and placed in the chapel of St. Florian. In the center of the altar is Golgotha and on the sides are small bas-reliefs on the themes of the Passion of Christ. The work of another Dutchman, Heinrich van Horst (several tombstones in the form of alabaster knights), survived in the Dominican Cathedral from its Gothic predecessor. Among the members of the Lviv Brotherhood, polyphonic choral singing was popular, which later spread to the East Slavic countries.

== Education and science ==
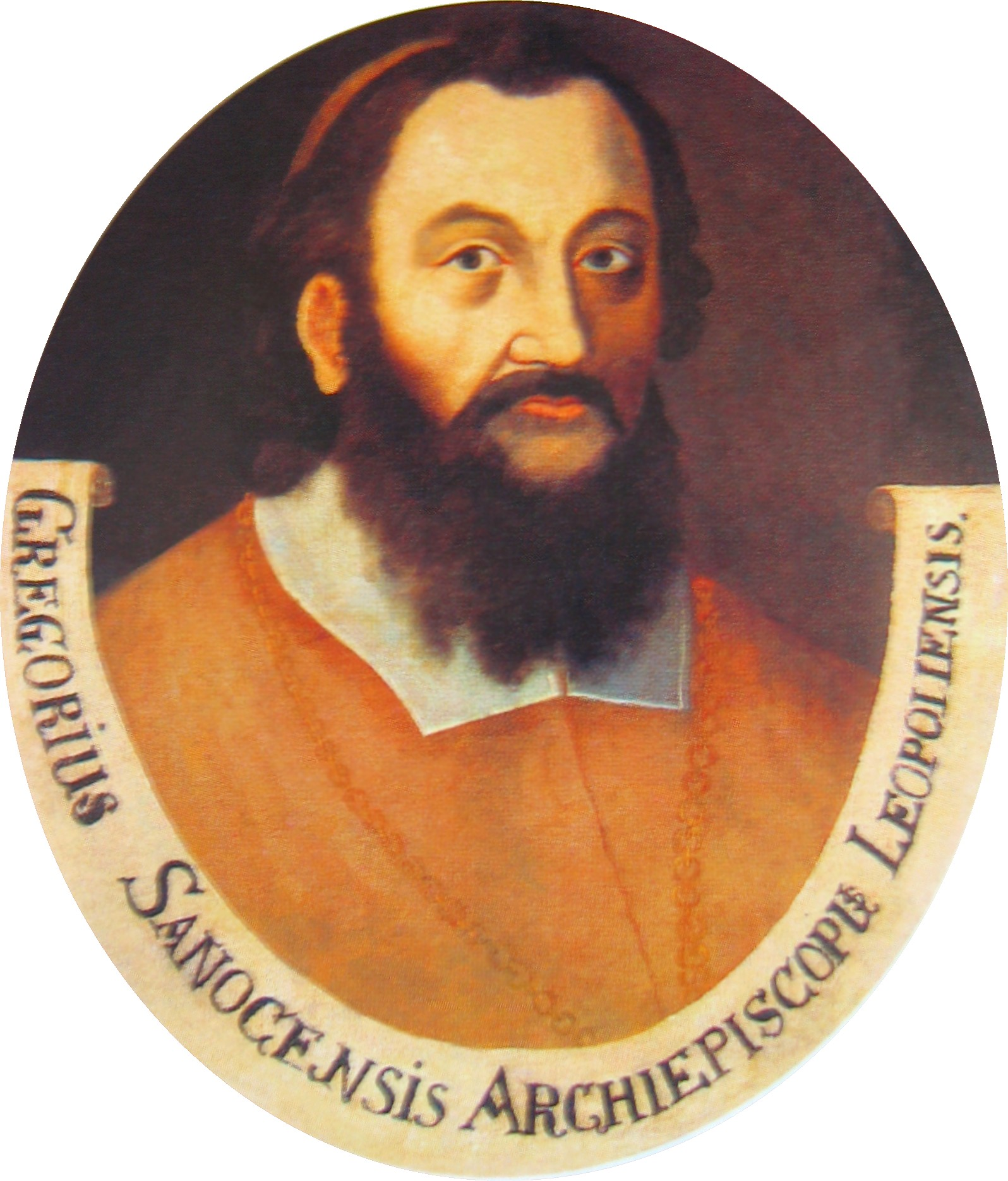
Gregory of Sanok

The first schools in medieval Lviv were established in cathedrals and monasteries, as well as in religious orders and fraternities. The Latin Cathedral and the Benedictine Monastery, the Assumption Brotherhood, the Annunciation Brotherhood, the Orthodox St. George Cathedral, the Armenian Cathedral and the Synagogue (for their respective denominations) had prestigious schools. Talented Catholic students could apply for scholarships from the Lviv magistrate and continue their studies at the best universities in Poland, Germany and Italy. Upon returning to Lviv, educated people often began their careers as clerks (notaries) or interpreters for the magistrate, and also participated in diplomatic missions.

Latin, Greek, and Polish were widely used in education, and Church Slavonic, Armenian, Hebrew, and Yiddish (in the schools of the respective ethnic groups) were used less frequently. From the end of the 14th century to the middle of the 16th century, the Gothic script was used in the office of the Lviv magistrate, which became a means of public communication of the city authorities in the Polish period (according to some sources, Latin script was also used in the princely chancery of the 13th century). In the late Middle Ages, Lviv had close contacts with Krakow and Poznan. In addition, the clerks of the city chancellery corresponded with many cities in Western Europe.

In 1451, Grzegorz of Sanok (Gregory Sanotsky) was elected Catholic Archbishop of Lviv, under whom Italian Renaissance culture spread in Lviv. Grzegorz actively opposed the uneducated and prejudiced Catholic clergy. Thanks to his efforts, the level of education in the Lviv Cathedral School, which became a branch of the University of Kraków, increased significantly, which was confirmed by a special privilege of King Casimir IV Jagiellon. The archbishop's country estate was a gathering place for Lviv's intellectuals of the time, and the Italian humanist Philip Callimachus lived there for a long time.

In the majority of monastery schools, the children of the nobility and burghers were taught to read, write, and pray; girls were also taught needlework. The cathedral school also taught history, theology, and philosophy.

== Estates and authorities ==
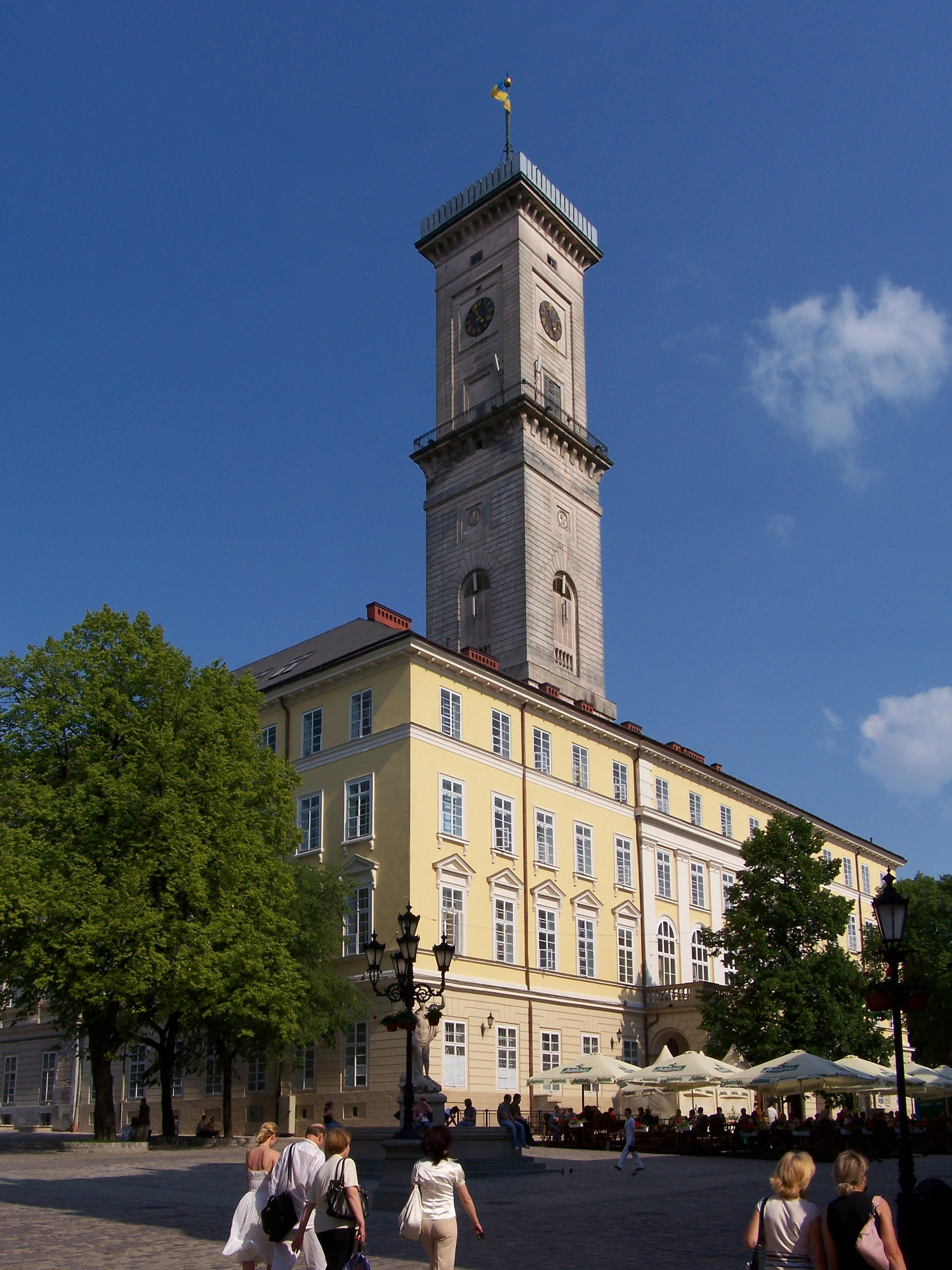
Modern view of the town hall, which existed on this site since the second half of the 14th century

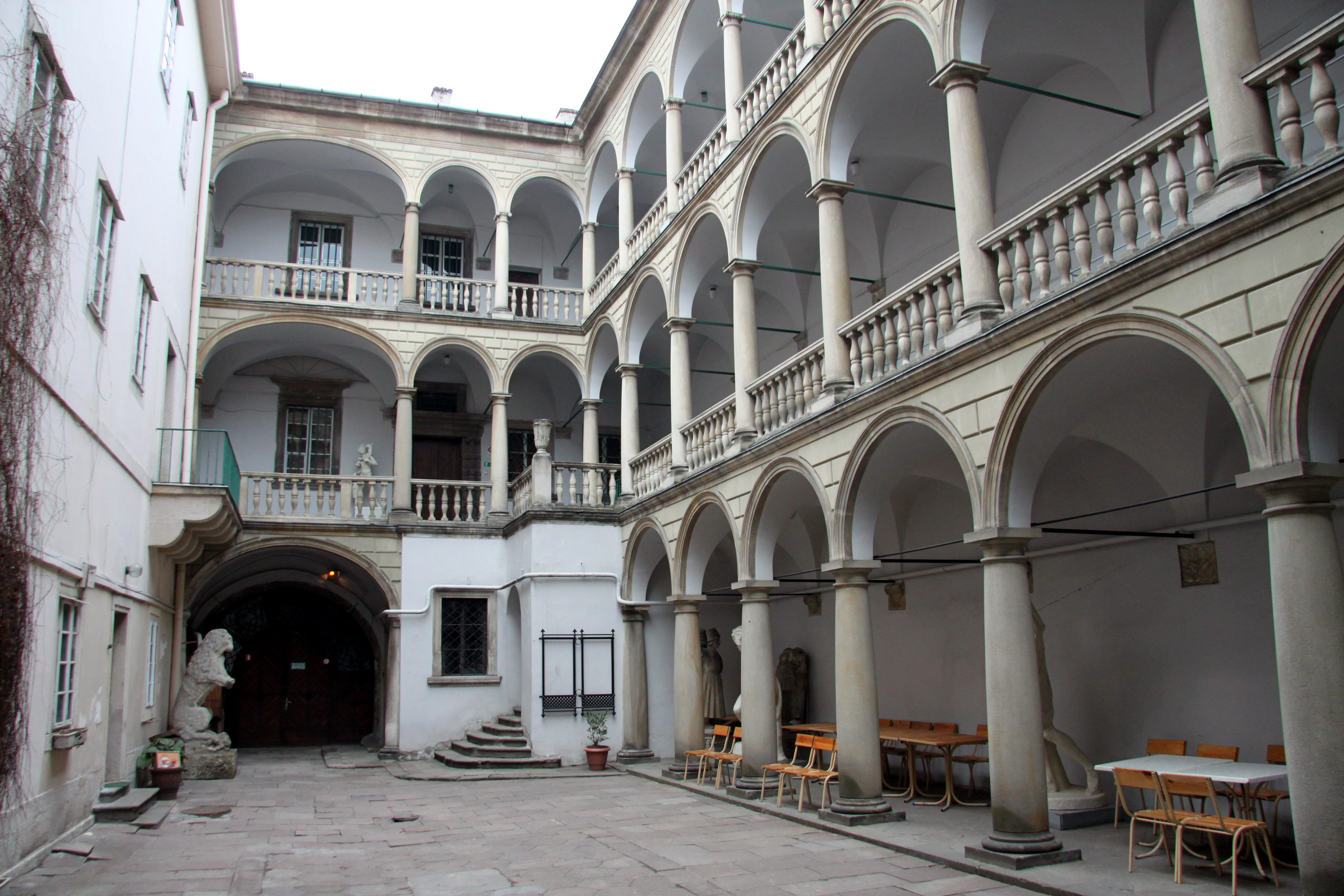
A courtyard in the palace of a rich Lviv merchant

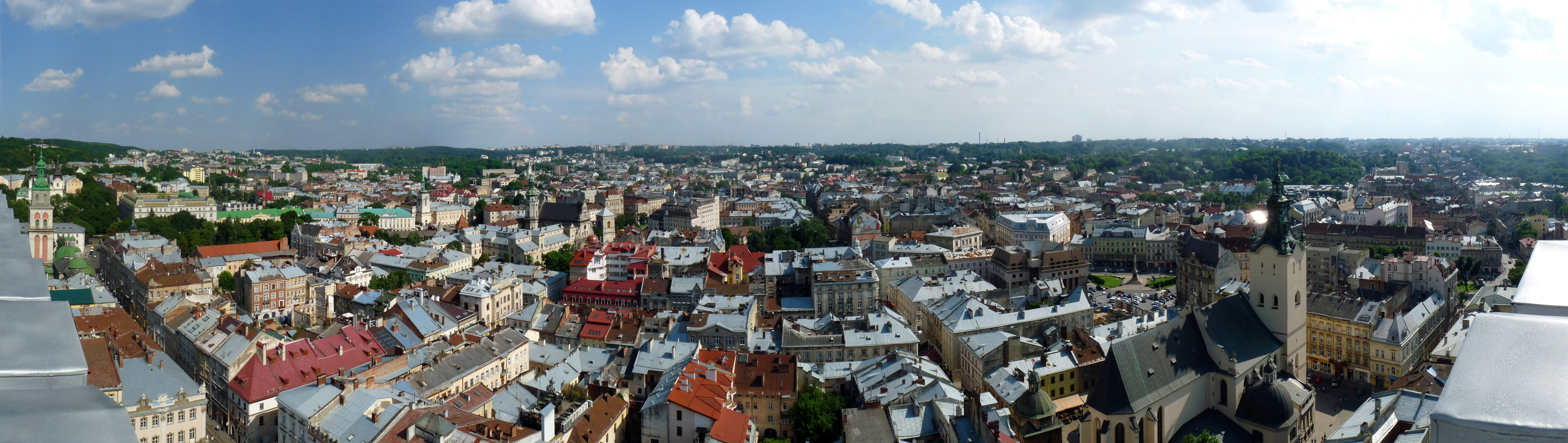
Southern part of the old town

Medieval Lviv had a complex social and administrative structure that developed from the Galicia–Volhynia Principality to the Polish period. At the beginning, in the 14th century, the city was governed by a voivode, who was subordinate to the prince. The voivode was the head of the garrison and the people's militia, and he also governed the city in the absence of the prince. In 1335, a letter from Prince Yuri II Boleslav mentioned the Lviv voivode Borisko Krakula.

After the Polish conquest of Galicia (the second half of the 14th century and the first third of the 15th century), the local boyars, as well as the Polish nobility who settled in Galicia, found themselves in a less favorable position than in other parts of the kingdom. The boyars had to live permanently on their lands and be ready for military action at the king's command, and they could not sell their estates without the king's permission.

The social structure of Lviv was closely related to the ethnic distribution of its population. The city consisted of four main social groups: the szlachta (including the Galician boyars, who recognized the authority of the king), the Catholic clergy, the burghers, and the suburban peasants. The szlachta and clergy were small in number but had the most privileges. The citizens were divided into three groups: the patriciate, the bourgeoisie and the poor. The patriciate consisted of rich merchants and artisans, while the burghery consisted of small and medium merchants and artisans. The urban poor had no civil rights and consisted mainly of apprentices, laborers, and people of low social status.

The city had a peculiarity of suburban villages that eventually became part of the city. These villages, originally owned by feudal lords, were placed under the administration of the magistrate in the 16th century. Many of their inhabitants were engaged in handicrafts or worked in feudal households.

There were three centers of power in Lviv: the city (the magistrate with the burgomaster and the raitzes), the royal (the voivode, the headman) and the church (the Catholic archbishop and the monasteries). The city was governed by elected offices: raitzes, burgomasters and wójts. Burgomasters performed administrative and judicial functions, settled disputes, supervised the observance of laws, and dealt with economic matters.

With the emergence of the Polish legal system in 1434, the position of voivode was established to administer the Ruthenian Voivodeship, control price policy, and settle disputes between different social groups. Until the end of the 15th century, Lviv had a system in which the burghers were not directly subordinate to the voivode, but the latter, as a representative of the royal authority, intervened in the affairs of the magistrate. Thus, Lviv in the Middle Ages was a multi-level system of government, with different population groups and centralized control by both the city government and the royal government.

== Economy ==
The economy of medieval Lviv was based on trade and crafts, so the city's prosperity depended directly on the safety of trade routes. In the 14th and the first half of the 15th century, there was a flourishing of economic life in Lviv, in the second half of the 14th century in the city appeared the first workshops. (Note: The earliest documentary mention of the organization of Lviv cobblers' shops dates back to 1386. In 1459, the weaver's shop received the first shop charter in the city.) In the second half of the 15th century, however, Lviv's economy stagnated due to the Ottoman conquest of Constantinople, the Balkans, and the Black Sea coast, which undermined Lviv merchants' trade relations with the East. Nevertheless, Lviv continued to exert great influence on the domestic market of the surrounding countries. In the second half of the 16th century there was a new boom in the city's economy, which led to the flourishing of crafts and trade. Frequent fires and epidemics were a real scourge for the trade (during the latter, the access of outsiders through the city gates was stopped, rich patricians left for country estates, and economic life in the city itself came to a standstill). There were also frequent the foreign attacks, during which Lviv was subjected to destruction and the city authorities had to pay large ransoms.

The trade organizations were borrowed from Western Europe, and German colonists were at the origin of the first Lviv handicraft enterprises. Soon the workshops became a means of restricting the rights of the non-Catholic population. It was very difficult for Ruthenians and Armenians to become members of the shop, and Jews were not allowed to join the shop at all (in the 16th century more than 95% of the craftsmen in the middle district were Catholics). According to the records of the court book of the Lviv magistrate and other documents, in the 80s of the 14th century there lived in Lviv representatives of 23 trades, in the 20s of the 15th century — 36 trades, in the 80s of the 15th century — 50 trades.

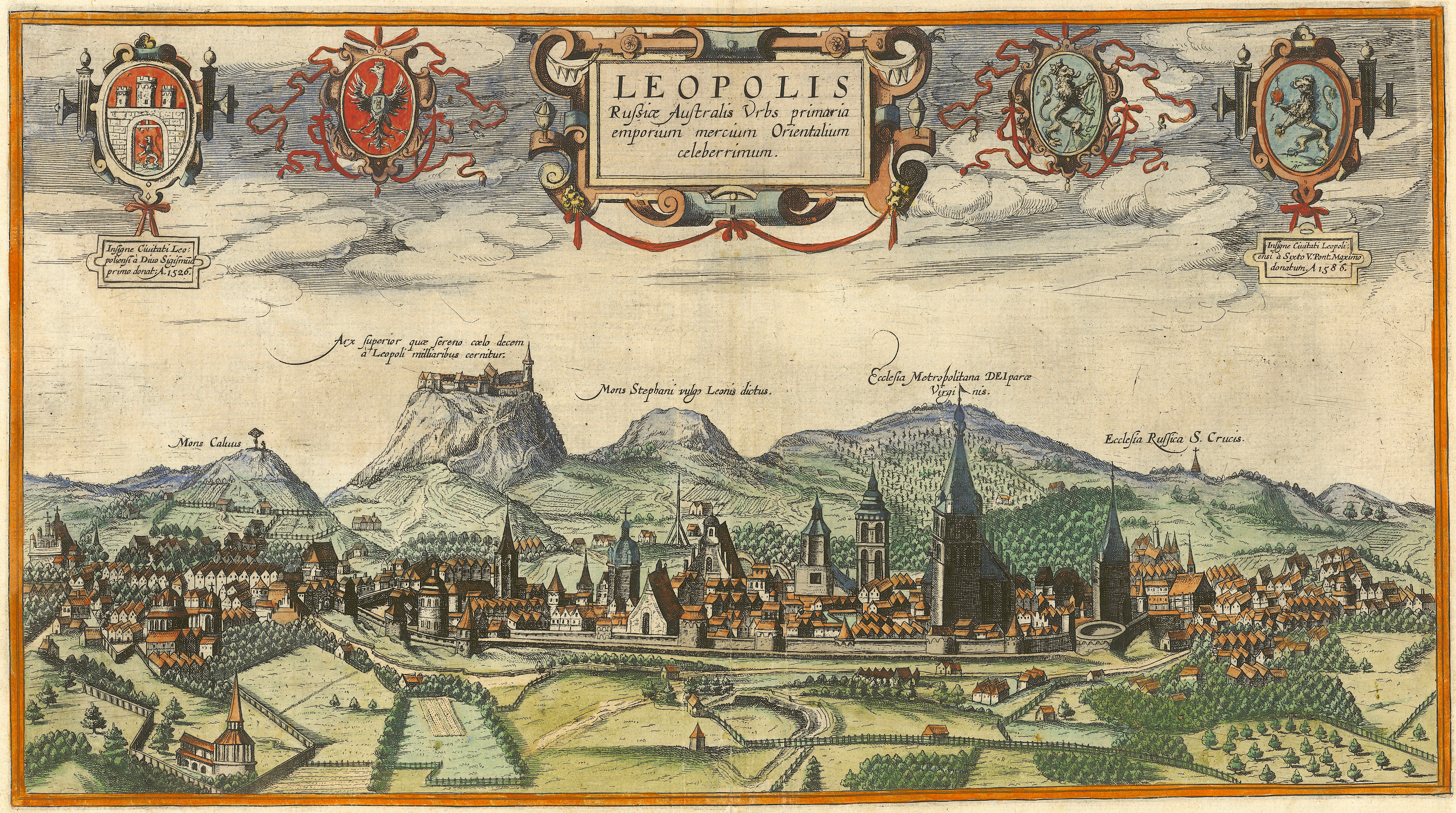
Panorama of Lviv at the beginning of the 17th century. Engraving by Abraham Hohenberg. The first known picture of the city

An analysis of the royal privileges granted to the national communities of Lviv shows that the best social position among the non-Catholic population was occupied by the Armenians. The Jews were the most economically restricted by the Catholic patriciate, but they were under the jurisdiction of the Ruthenian voivode and were not subject to the judicial power of the city (thus the municipality did not have full control over the Jewish community). Therefore, the Ruthenians as the weakest ethnic group in terms of social status were actually in the worst position. A significant part of Ruthenian, Armenian, and Jewish artisans lived in the suburbs, namely in the territory of legal centers, whose owners were primarily concerned with profit rather than religious restriction.

=== External trade ===
Since its foundation, Lviv has been at the crossroads of busy trade routes. As a major city of Red Ruthenia and the largest city of the Galicia–Volhynia Principality, Lviv played an important role on the trade route between Kyiv in the east and Krakow and Prague in the west. Goods wagons from Kyiv came through Lutsk and Terebovlia, wagons from Moldavia and Wallachia — through Kamianets-Podilskyi, Kolomyia and Halych, wagons from Poland, Bohemia, Austria and Germany — through Peremyshl and Yaroslav, from the Baltic ports — through Volodymyr and Belz.

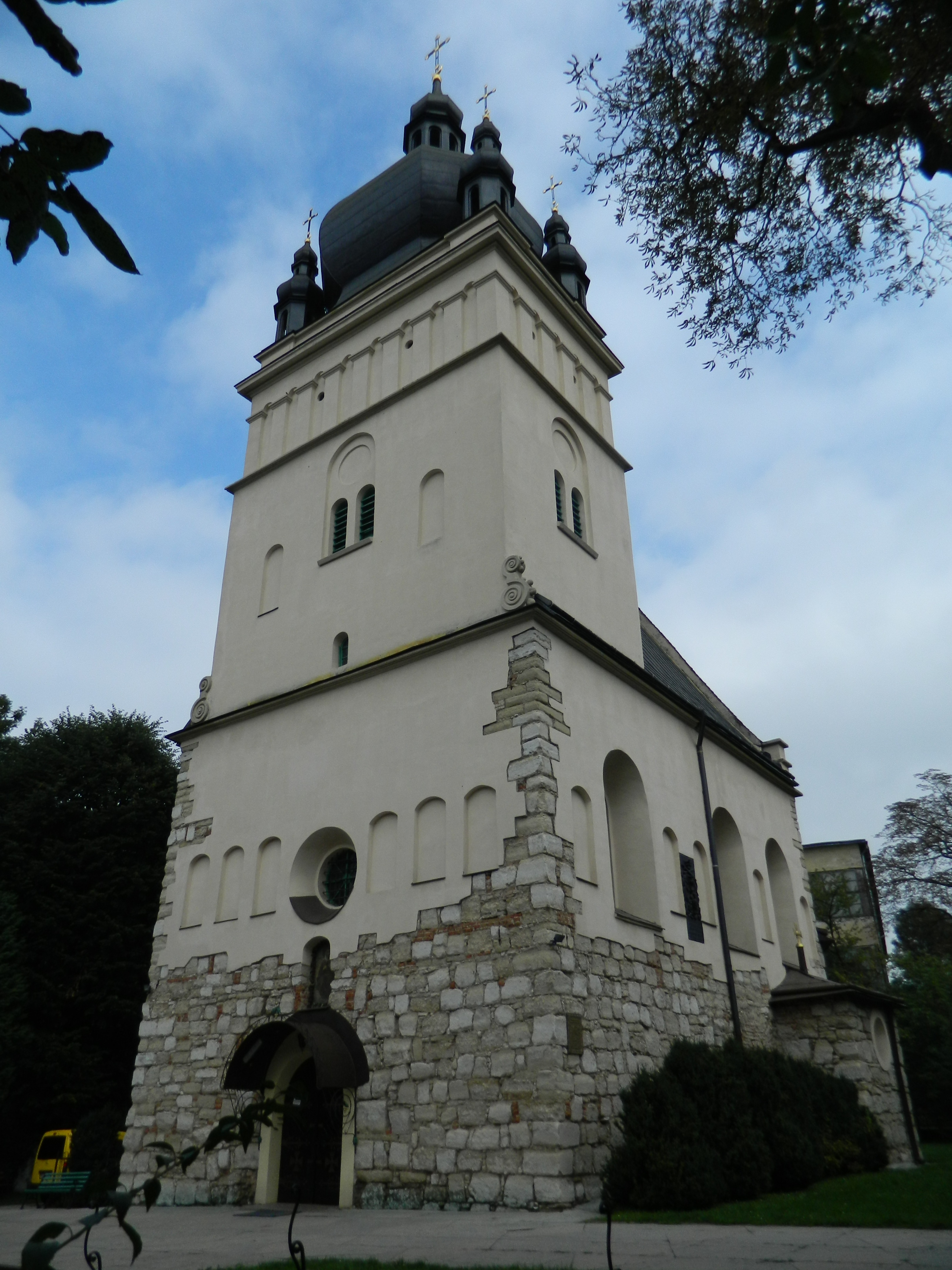
St. Paraskeva Friday Church

After Lviv became part of Poland, the city became an important point of transit trade between Central Europe and the East, as well as between Rus' and the Baltic ports. In 1372, Lviv was granted the "right of warehouse": all non-resident merchants, both Polish and foreign, could not bypass the city, they had to stop and sell their goods to Lviv merchants. Thanks to this right and other privileges granted to local merchants, Lviv became an important intermediary center of trade between East and West (especially between the Crimea, the northern Black Sea coast, and the cities of the Hanseatic League). Merchant carts arrived in the city from Germany, Flanders, Hungary, Bohemia, Italy, the Grand Duchy of Lithuania and the Genoese colonies in the Crimea. In the 14th century, Lviv was directly connected with Tanais, Kaffa, Chilia and Bilhorod. During the reign of Gospodar Mircea the Old, direct trade contracts were concluded between Wallachian and Lviv merchants (1390 and 1409).

In 1439, Vlad II Dracul issued a charter allowing Lviv merchants to trade freely in his lands and to travel through Wallachia to the Turks. In the second half of the 15th century, Lviv merchants strengthened trade relations with Gdansk, through whose port there was active trade with Scandinavian countries, the Netherlands, France, England and Scotland. In 1460, Stephen III the Great granted Lviv merchants trade privileges in the Moldavian Principality (they exported livestock, especially oxen, furs, wines, honey, caviar and fish, and brought iron knives, scythes, axes, fabrics and silverware). In the markets of Lviv, cloth, weapons, harnesses, agricultural tools, grain, wood, resin, potash, wax and honey were sold for re-export. In addition to Moldavia, Wallachia, and Gdańsk, Lviv merchants were active in Kraków, Warsaw, and Vilnius.

Wine, silver, gold, copper, iron, gunpowder and cattle were imported from Hungary, furs, wax, yurt, handicrafts and artistic products were brought from Principality of Moscow (Lviv merchants visited Smolensk, Novgorod, Moscow and other cities). In the late 15th and early 16th centuries, there were radical changes in Lviv's foreign trade. After the Ottomans conquered Constantinople and the northern Black Sea coast, the transit trade in eastern goods, dominated by Armenians, Jews, Italians and Germans, declined. Lviv merchants reoriented themselves to other markets and goods, and the city became an important center for grain, livestock, hides, as well as wood, wax, salt, and saltpeter.

In the 16th century, Armenian, Greek and Jewish merchants established close trade relations between Lviv and the cities of the Ottoman Empire. Among the imported goods were silk, satin, Persian carpets, gold, raisins, spices and condiments, Syrian harness and Arabian horses.

=== Internal trade and finance ===
In the second half of the 14th century, a silver Ruthenian groschen was minted in Lviv on the order of Tsar Casimir III, and it soon became the most common coin. In 1370-1372, the Lviv mint ceased to function, but it was Vladyslaus Opolchik who resumed the minting of Ruthenian groschen of various types and weights. Since the end of 1378, under the control of the new Galician governor Emeric, Lviv began to mint coins on behalf of King Ludwig of Hungary.

The last issues of groschenfrom the Lviv Mint date back to the reign of King Vladyslaus II Jagiello. In 1399, due to the gradual abolition of the autonomy of the Galician lands and the unification of the Galician and Krakow monetary systems, the minting of Ruthenian groschenwas stopped. At the same time, the issue of Lviv semigroschen began.

In 1353–1382, Ruthenian copper denarii were minted in Lviv on behalf of Casimir III, Vladyslaus of Opole, and Ludwig of Hungary, which served as a unit of exchange in the domestic market ("city money"). One kopa or 60 Ruthenian denarii was equal to one Ruthenian groschen, and two groschens were equal to the Prague groschen.

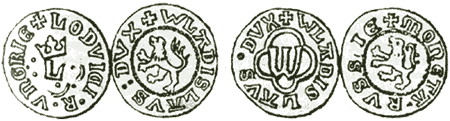
Vladislaus II of Opole's coins

Vladyslaus of Opole spent a lot of time reforming Lviv's tax system, city finances and land ownership. He granted the city the "right of warehouse", confirmed in 1380 by Ludwig of Hungary, introduced the position of Lviv tax collector, who collected taxes and dues from merchants, and issued a quid pro quo, according to which the city received revenues from the execution of judicial punishments on its territory. Opole gave a tithe from Lviv customs and salt sales to the Catholic archbishop.

The prince exempted part of the city lands from taxes, gave part of the income to the church and the city (he also took church lands out of the city jurisdiction). In order to speed up the settlement of the suburbs, Opolczyk exempted the inhabitants of the suburbs from taxes and chinchas for 20 years. He also encouraged the migration of craftsmen from Moravia and Silesia to Lviv. In 1405, by the decree of Vladyslaus II Jagiello, an extraordinary tax was introduced in Lviv to redeem the Dobrzynska land from the crusaders.

In 1425, Vladyslaus II exempted all Lviv burghers and merchants who swore allegiance to his newborn son, the future king Vladyslaus III, from paying taxes within the Polish kingdom. In March 1426, Vladyslaus II freed all Lviv burghers from the obligation to provide carriages and horses for royal messengers and falconers.

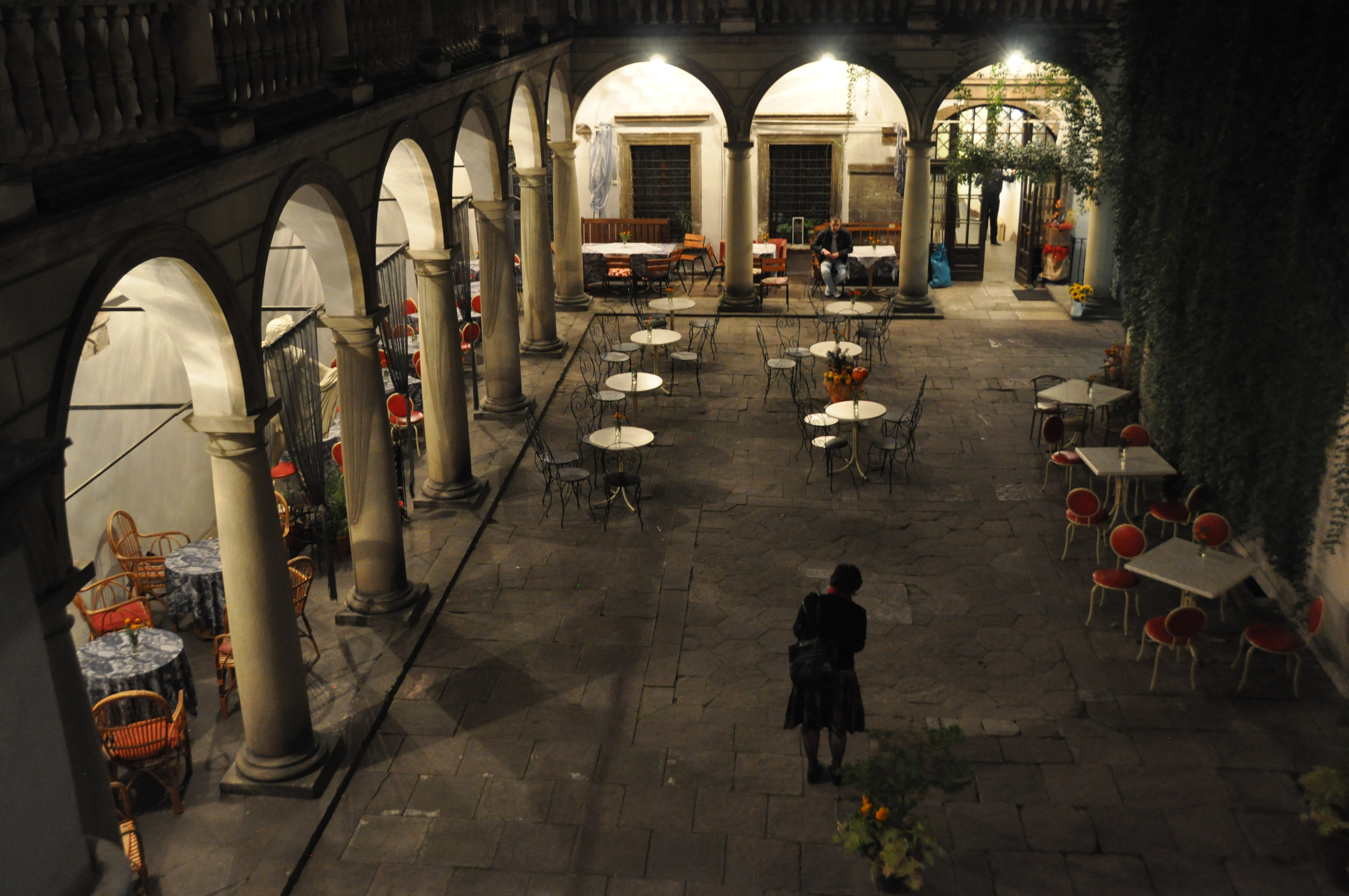
Italian Courtyard in the palace on Market Square

Economic growth contributed to the formation of permanent markets where agricultural products and handicrafts were exchanged. Beginning in 1472, Lviv held crowded two-week fairs in January and July. Wealthy merchants, some craftsmen, Catholic churches and monasteries engaged in usury. At the end of the 16th century, the largest Lviv financiers, who lent to both private individuals and the magistrate, were the Korniakt, Campian, and Alembek families.

Large groups of merchants' shops (kramnitsy) were located around Market Square, Galician and Krakowskie Gates of the city. In the place of today's Staroievreiska and Serbska Streets they traded cattle, in the place of Teatralna Street (in the area between Mickiewicza Square and Berinda Street) — meat, in the place of Krakivska Street— weapons and armor. The name of Market Square came from the German word ring, later transformed into the concept of "market" as a place of trade. Here were located the magistrates and houses of noble citizens, here they traded and organized executions, it was the busiest place of medieval Lviv.

=== Crafts ===
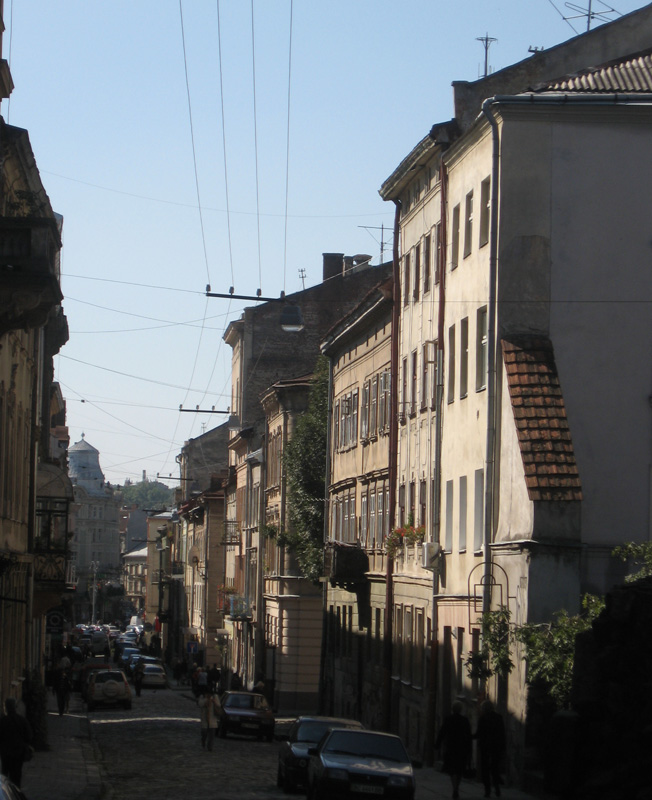
Rogatintsev Brothers Street

The oldest metal smelting furnaces, discovered in 1992 on the site of the Dobrobut Market, date back to the early princely period. In 1997, on Old Market Square, foundry molds, products made of various materials, a jew's harp from the 14th–15th centuries, lime kilns and leather processing vats from the 15th century were found.

In 1997 and 2000, eastern pottery was found, including amphorae and grain pithos. Local potters produced primitive wares based on southeastern patterns. Among the local pottery were water pipes, glazed bowls from the fourteenth to fifteenth centuries.

Craftsmen made up the majority of the population and organized themselves into workshops that regulated the economic activities of the city. Despite primitive tools, the products of Lviv craftsmen were famous for their high quality and were exported to Europe. Workshops such as waxworks and foundries founded by the magistrate produced goods for Germany, France, and the Crimea.

Lviv was also known for its foundries, such as the bell of St. Yura Church from 1341 and the bell Isaiah from 1584. In 1491, a bell was cast for the city hall. The town developed jewelry, blacksmithing and pottery, as well as the production of honey, wax, beer and wine. In 1407 and 1425, nine craft shops are mentioned, and at the end of the 15th century their number increased to fourteen.

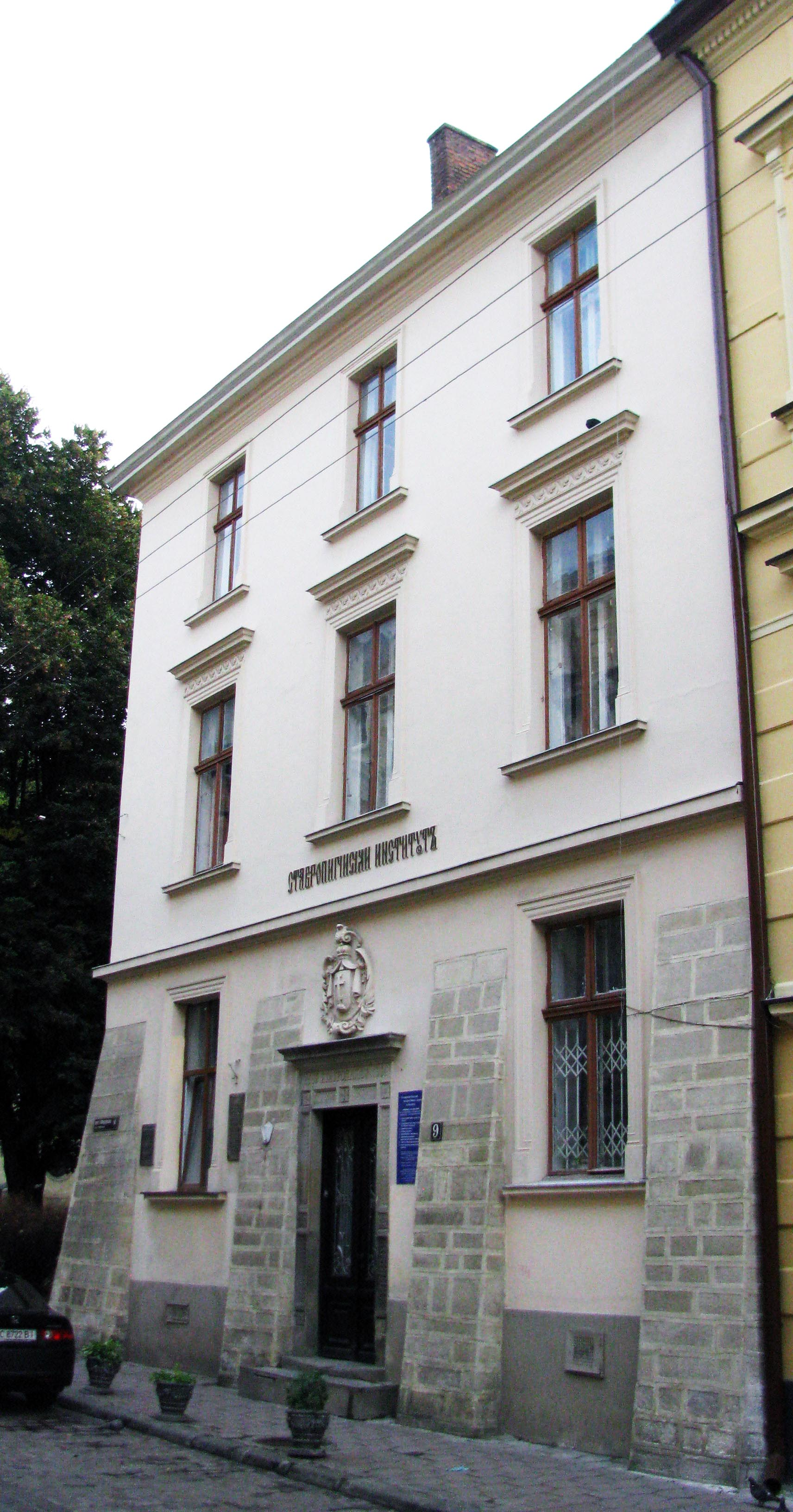
The Assumption Brotherhood Printing House

In the 16th century, workshops slowed down the development of production and became closed companies that hindered technical improvements. From the end of the 15th century, workshop products were increasingly produced for sale. Journeymen and apprentices were trained for 3 to 7 years. In the 15th century, organizations of apprentices began to appear to protect their rights.

Artisans outside the workshops, such as refugee peasants and foreign artisans, were called partachas. They made up 40% of the artisans, competing with the workshops and influencing the market.

Lviv was an important center for the production of weapons, ammunition and armor. In the 14th and 15th centuries, crossbows and cannons were made, and the first mention of cannoneers dates back to 1404. In 1468, an arsenal was built where cannons and bells were made, and in the 16th century, gunpowder was produced.

In 1579, there were 20 craft shops in Lviv, and the number of craft professions reached over a hundred. The products of Lviv craftsmen were sold in various countries. Book printing and architecture developed during the Renaissance, and Ivan Fedorov founded a printing press in the house of Adam Bondar.

== Daily life and holidays ==
Already in the princely period of Lviv's history (late 13th-14th centuries), the city streets were paved with wood, and some residential houses were built in the timber framing technique. In Gothic or "Polish" Lviv, half-timbered houses gradually began to replace wooden buildings, and defensive structures, while temples and patrician residences were built of stone blocks and bricks. As a result of archaeological excavations, there were found fragments of a stone-paved street that ran along the inner perimeter of the High Wall, as well as a brick embankment that ran along the Poltva River and the second line of defense from the west.

The change from wooden to stone buildings can be seen especially in the traces of houses located along the oldest trade route crossing the city (today's Knyazya Romana, Halytska, Krakowska and Bogdan Khmelnitsky Streets), as well as around the Market Square. Due to frequent fires, wooden and timber framed houses were replaced by stone houses (kamianytsi), the active construction of which began in the 15th-16th centuries, but to this day most of the foundations, first floors or fragments of later rebuilt buildings of that period have survived. Often in the following centuries in the old stone houses were added floors, floors or separate rooms were reorganized for wealthy tenants, on the first floors were arranged shops.

Market Square

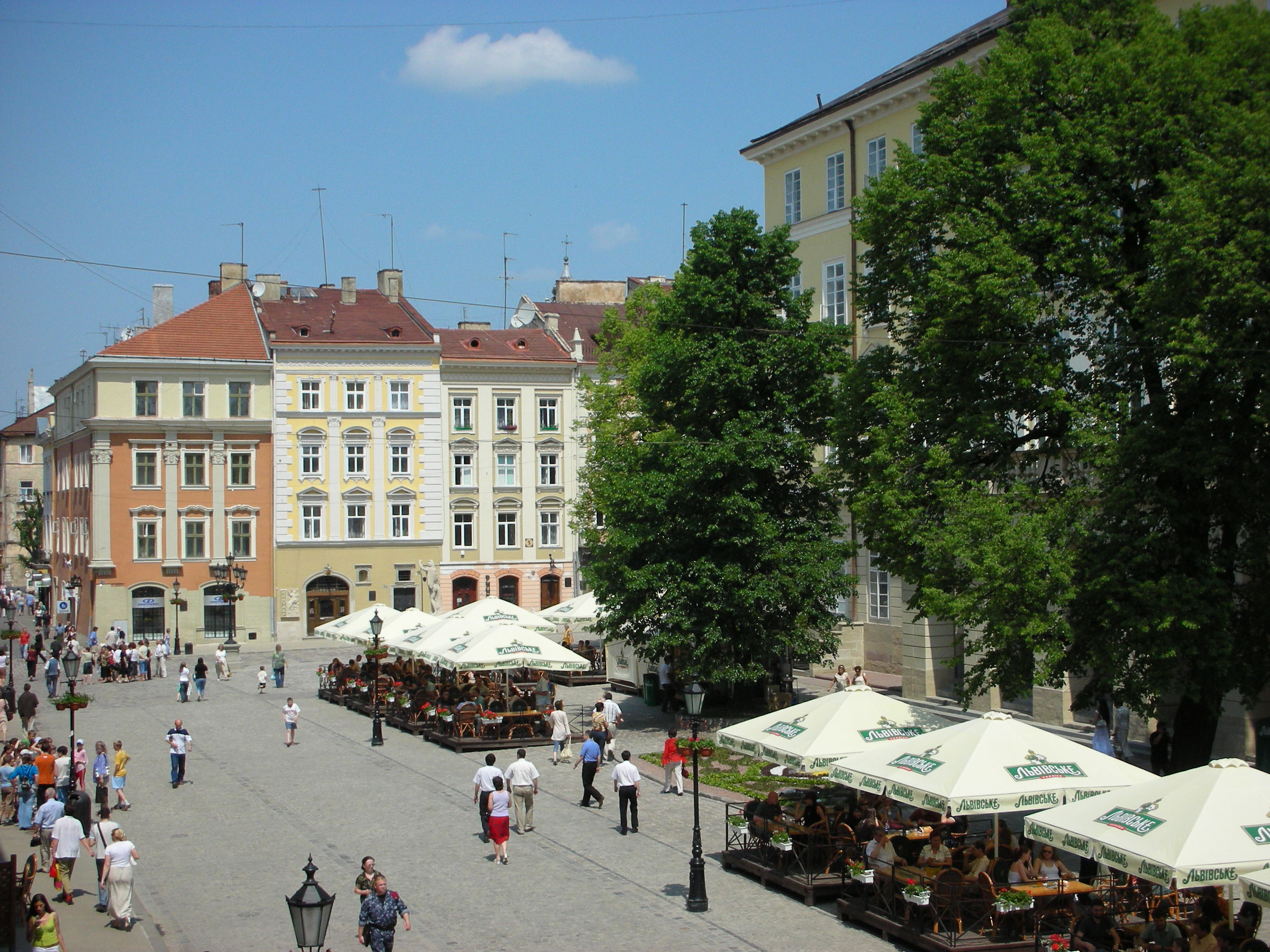

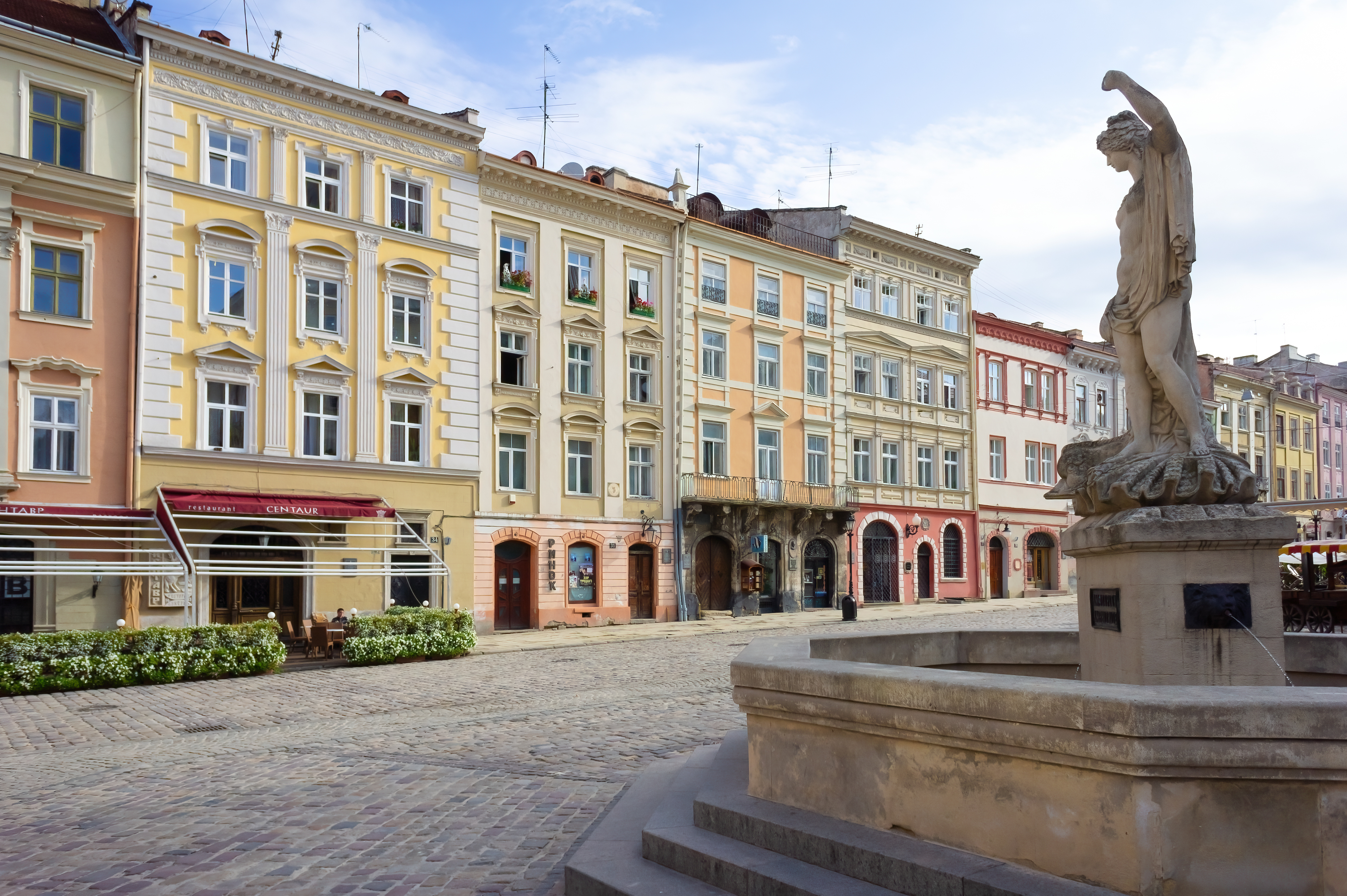

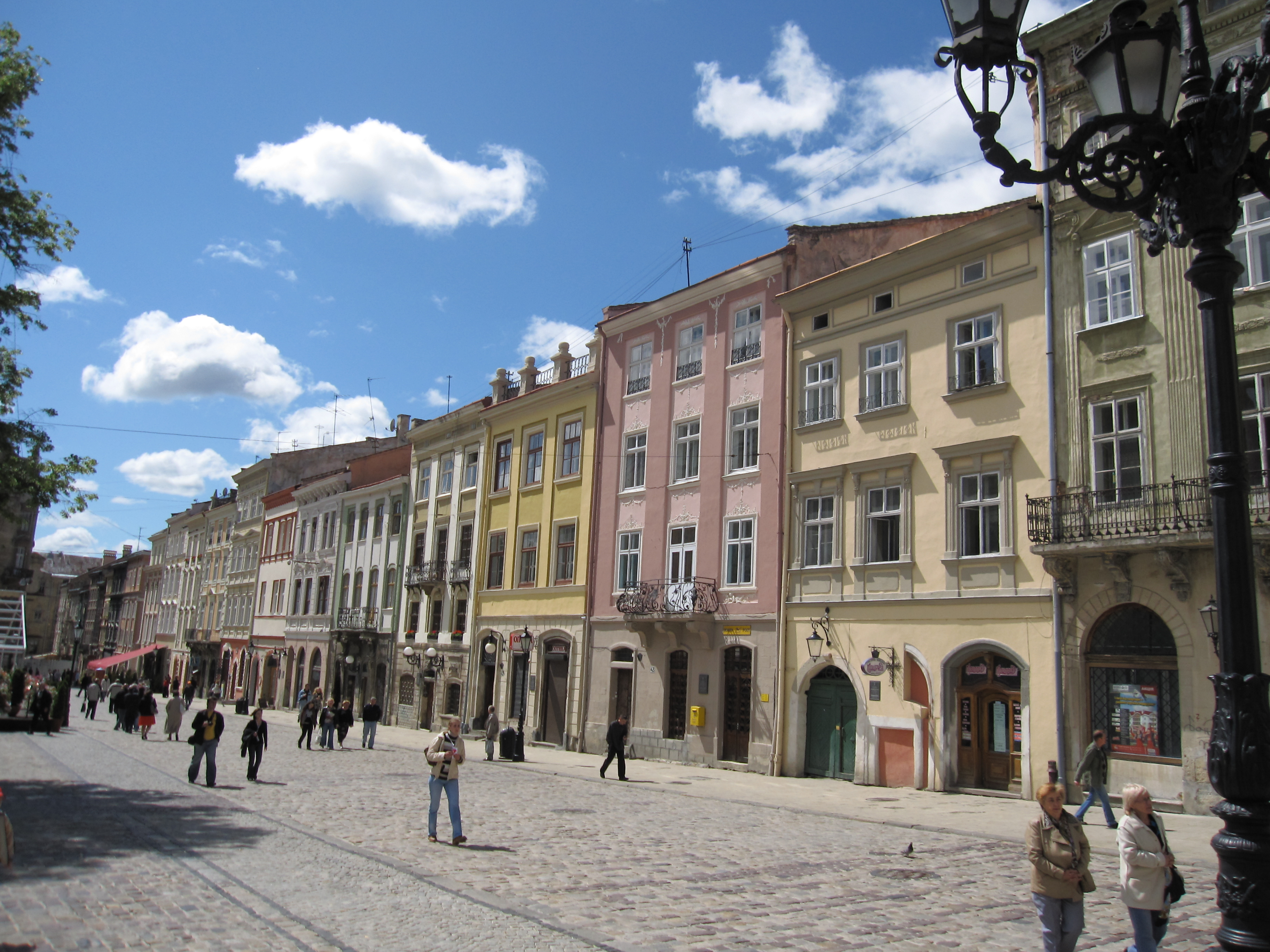

The city officials were ordered to wear only Polish clothing. Gothic shoes found during excavations in the 15th and 16th centuries had a pointed toe and a narrowing of the sole at the transition from the heel to the foot. The upper was cut from a single piece of leather. All parts of the found footwear were joined by a tach seam. In the 16th century, the boots of the nobility had colored uppers made of special types of leather (like morocco leather), and the shoes of the commoners were made of plain black or gray leather (in connection with this feature of medieval fashion appeared in Lviv a saying Vydno pana po khaliavakh, which can be translated literally as "A lord is seen by his boots").

In Lviv, all religious holidays were celebrated (national minorities had a number of restrictions and celebrated mainly in their neighborhoods), as well as the accession of Polish kings to the throne, the birth of throne heirs, and major military victories of the state. The city was transformed during the visits of the king or other high-ranking guests. On various solemn occasions, the magistrate organized banquets in the town hall and also allocated money to give alms to the poor.

Witches, sorcerers, fortune tellers and clairvoyants, often mentioned in medieval court cases, were an element of urban folklore. They gave and took away booty, cured and delivered babies, made potions and amulets, helped in business and personal matters. According to rumors, the place where witches gathered was the Lysovka Hill in Vynnyky.

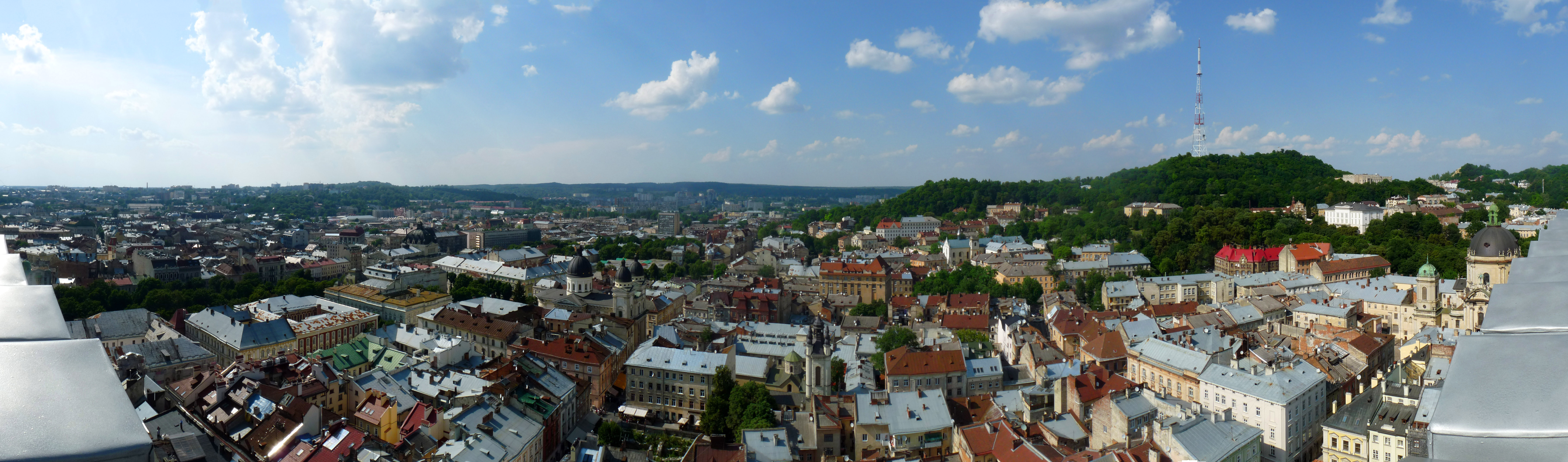
Northern part of the old city

The Church was very influential in the medieval society. Religious restrictions made inter-ethnic and inter-confessional contacts difficult. Despite the pressure of the Catholic patriciate, which prevented the construction of new Orthodox churches and synagogues, there were very few cases of Ruthenians or Jews converting to Catholicism, as well as mixed marriages in Lviv. Most Ruthenians kept their original names. When members of different denominations married, it was usually the remarriage of widows and widowers. Most mixed marriages took place in the suburbs and urban villages, because in the middle suburbs such marriages were seen negatively and could even be punished. Children from mixed Orthodox-Catholic marriages were forbidden to be baptized in the Orthodox Church, and those who were baptized were forcibly returned to Catholicism. In order to reduce the number of marriages between Ruthenians and Poles, the procedure for dissolving mixed marriages was even made easier.

== Medicine and sanitation ==
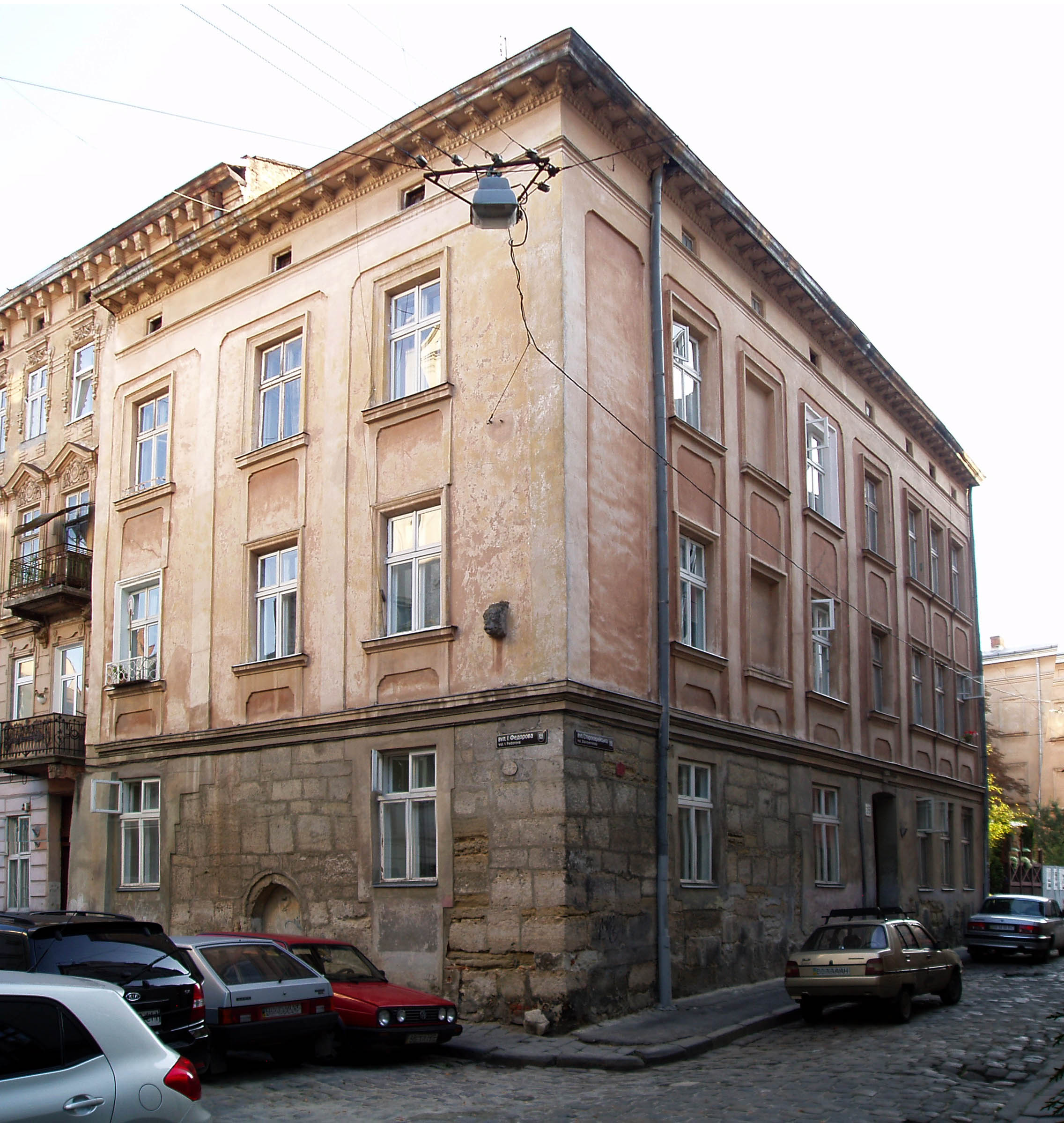
House 35 on Staroievreiska Street

Surrounded by fortifications, ramparts and moats, medieval Lviv lacked clean drinking water, especially during sieges. Residents raised fish in the moats, and numerous streams flowed here, carrying domestic and industrial sewage out of the city. As the population grew, the wells inside the fortress walls could no longer meet Lviv's drinking water needs. Moreover, because of their proximity to cemeteries and during heavy rains, the water in these wells did not meet sanitary standards. Craft shops, bakeries, municipal bathhouses, and households where beer was brewed consumed a lot of water.

The first information about Lviv's water supply system dates back to the end of the 13th century. The charter of Prince Leo Danilovich (1292) mentions a stone shaft through which water flowed from the spring on Castle Hill through the garden of St. Nicholas Church to the Lower Castle. Later, on the basis of natural springs, a whole system of stone and wooden reservoirs was built around the Upper Castle, from which water flowed into the town. Another reservoir was located on the Lychakiv Hills, namely on the territory of the fields of the Holy Spirit Hospital. In the 14th century, there appeared in Lviv water carriers, who delivered water in barrels, and water carriers, but their services were too expensive for most consumers.

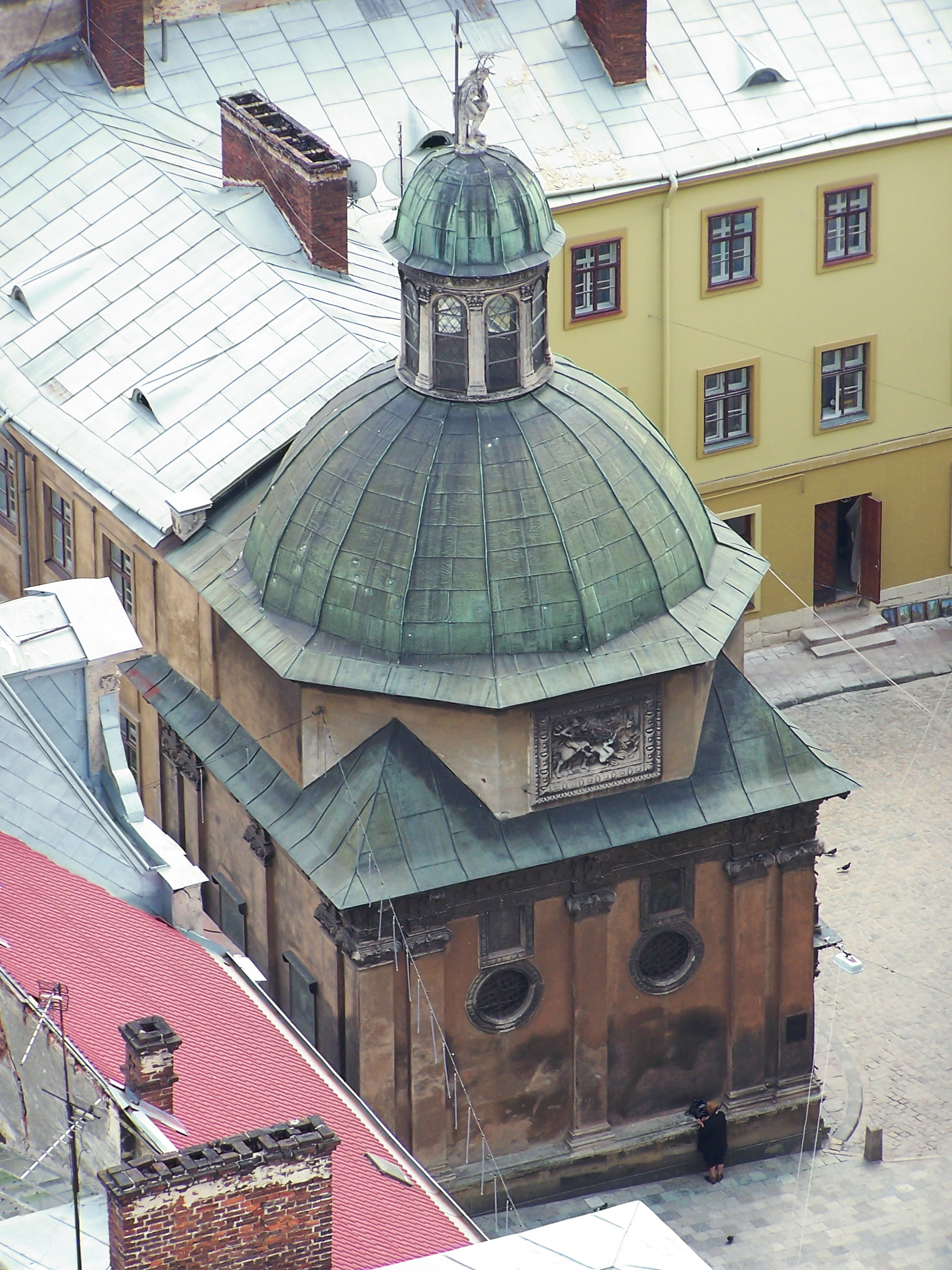
A Catholic cemetery was there in the Middle Ages

Excavations carried out in 1997, revealed the bed of a stream that used to flow from the High Castle in the area of today's Knez Leo Street. In the 14th century, the stream was dammed and a ceramic water pipe was laid along its bed, which supplied water to the Eastern-style bathhouse that operated in the vicinity of today's Old Market Square.

In the 15th and 16th centuries, the city authorities actively undertook to solve the problem of water supply. In the years 1404-1407, under the leadership of Peter Shteher, the first water pipeline was built, in which water flowed by gravity through ceramic pipes, but its exact location is unknown. In 1411, another 250 pipes were laid, from which about a hundred branches were built over the next two years. In 1464, the first one was built in the Galician suburb (the second one in 1497), in 1471, three in the Market Square, in 1482, — one near the Krakow Gate, in 14808, — a new one in front of the Town Hall, in 1490, — at the end of Krakivska Street and near the Women's Bath, in 1492, — in front of the Dominican Monastery. In 1505, 241 pipes were laid, in 1532, 504 pipes were used to build 59 larger and 42 smaller pipes.

While the first water pipes were made of ceramic pipes, later the Ruhrmasters switched to cheaper and more reliable wooden pipes (made of drilled oak, alder or pine trunks). The trenches dug for the pipes were reinforced with stone or mortar, the joints of the pipes were sealed with resin, and the wooden sections themselves were fastened with staples and shackled with iron. The route of the water pipe was kept strictly secret, especially from strangers. In the first half of the 16th century, the city's water pipes converged at the Market Square into a stone water collector (vodna skrinja), which stood in front of the Town Hall, and from there water was supplied to the houses through wooden pipes.

The plague, cholera and typhus epidemics, which claimed thousands of lives, were a great disaster for medieval Lviv. The first epidemic recorded in written sources struck Lviv in the winter of 1288 (probably brought by Mongol troops besieging the city). The plague epidemic of 1362 was among the most significant, and then epidemics were repeated in 1480 and 1484. In the fall of 1497, the remnants of a Polish army defeated in Bukovina brought the plague back to the city.

The next big epidemics hit Lviv in 1547, 1572-1573, 1588, 1594 and 1599. During the epidemic of 1547, the cathedral school was closed and the magistrate compensated the rector for his financial losses. In 1587-1589, Lviv for the first time established the post of "pestilential burgomaster", who was given special powers during the epidemic or on the eve of it. The epidemic of 1599 claimed the lives of about 2 thousand Lviv citizens (St. Wojciech's Church was built in their memory). Those who died during the epidemics were not buried in the city cemeteries, but outside of Lviv. One of such plague cemeteries from the 16th century was located in the place of the present-day Lychakiv cemetery.

The city cemeteries, located mainly near monasteries and churches, posed a threat to the sanitary condition of Lviv. One of the largest cemeteries within the city walls was the Latin Cathedral cemetery, of which only the Boim Chapel remains today. During the Austrian rule, all medieval cemeteries in Lviv were liquidated.

The first almshouses, which combined the features of medical institutions and charitable shelters for the poor, appeared in churches and monasteries. They were supported by the funds of religious brotherhoods, as well as by donations from parishioners and individual wealthy citizens. The oldest of them was St. Elizabeth's Hospital (Shpytal), founded by Casimir III in the area of the present Ivan Pidkova Square. The hospital was also supported by Władysław Opolczyk, who added to it the chapel of the Lower Castle (previously taken from the Orthodox and consecrated in 1377 with the names of St. Catherine and St. Mary Magdalene). The rector of the hospital and the chapel received a salary from the prince, appointed from the taxes of the Lviv mills. In 1399-1408, (according to other sources it was built in 1377–1431) the Church of the Holy Spirit was built, from which the almshouse became known as the Hospital of the Holy Spirit. From the beginning of the 15th century, a dispute between the archbishop and the magistrate over the ownership of the hospital dragged on, and only in 1546, the Holy Spirit Hospital was fully subordinated to the city. Another old almshouse was St. Stanislaus Hospital, which burned down in 1509 during the Moldavian siege of the city.

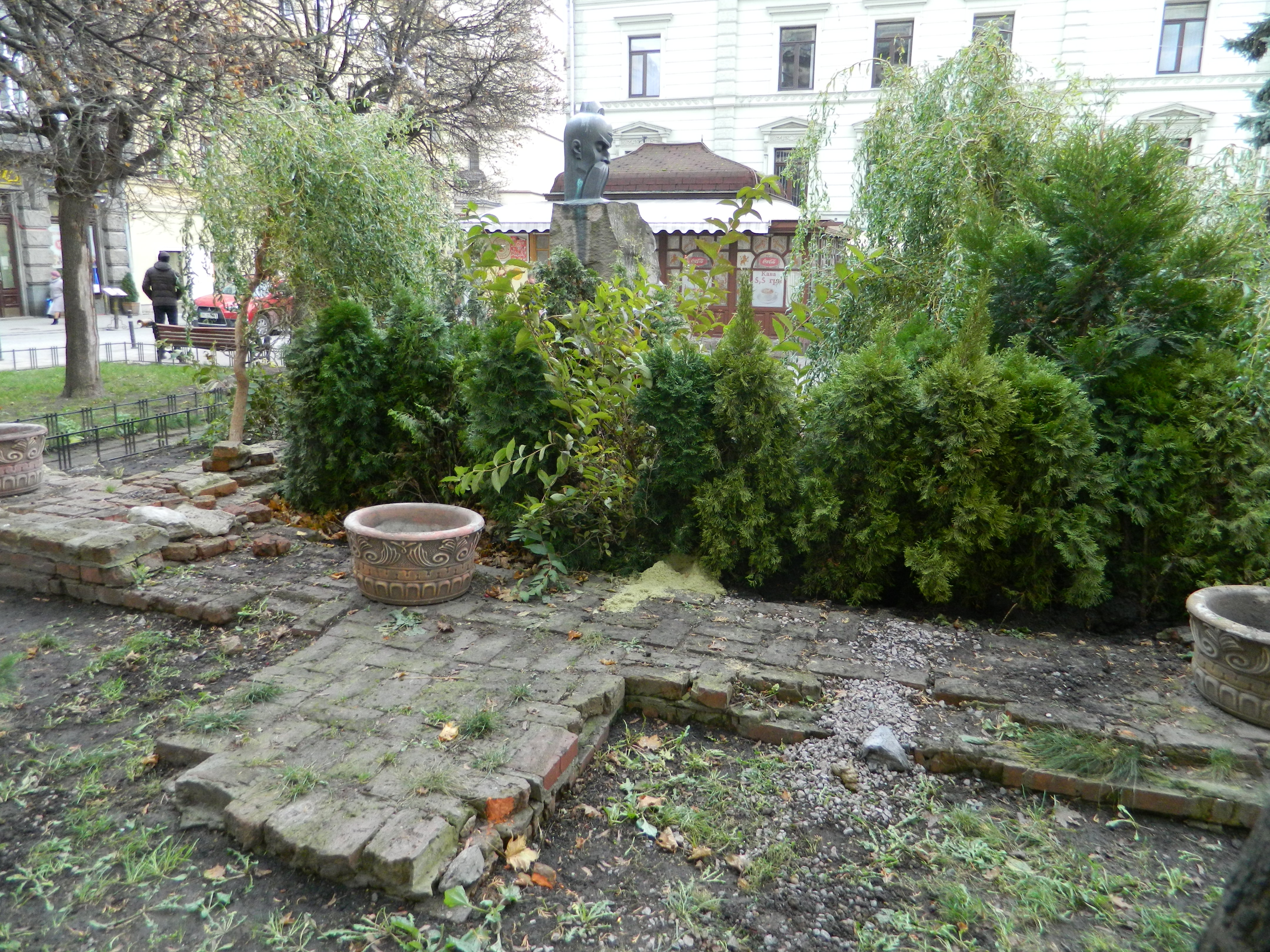
Remains of ancient walls in Pidkova Square

In medieval Lviv, the apothecary business was developed and there were rudiments of pharmacy. The first pharmacy appeared in the palace of Prince Leo Danilovich in the place of the present Dominican Monastery. It was founded in 1270 by Leo's wife, Constance of Hungary. Later, pharmacies were opened in many monasteries and city almshouses (besides medicines, they sold spices, dried fruits, nuts, sugar, rice, citrus fruits, soap, sweets and medicinal herbs, as well as candles, olive oil, paints and other household goods). Medicines based on folk recipes and European treatises were made by physicians and surgeons, as well as by many burghers for personal use.

The city chronicles and laws of 1392 mentioned the pharmacist Clement, and in the chronicles of 1445 there is information about the pharmacist Vasiliy Rusin, who received the citizenship of Lviv. In the middle of the 15th century, there was a shortage of pharmacists in Lviv, and the magistrate was forced to invite foreigners and allocate funds for the purchase of ointments and medicines. The first permanent pharmacy of the modern type appeared in the city in the second half of the 15th century and was located on the corner of Market Square and today's Drukarska Street. In 1574, it was bought by the Zentkiewicz family, who owned it until 1850. In the second half of the 16th century, the pharmacist Marcin Starzachowski, who traded at fairs near the Town Hall and in 1566, received a royal license to sell liquor without paying taxes, and the Armenian Pavel Abragamowicz, who received the title of military doctor in 1596, but retained the right to trade in his pharmacy, were also famous. At the end of the 16th century, the German family of pharmacists Alnpek became famous.

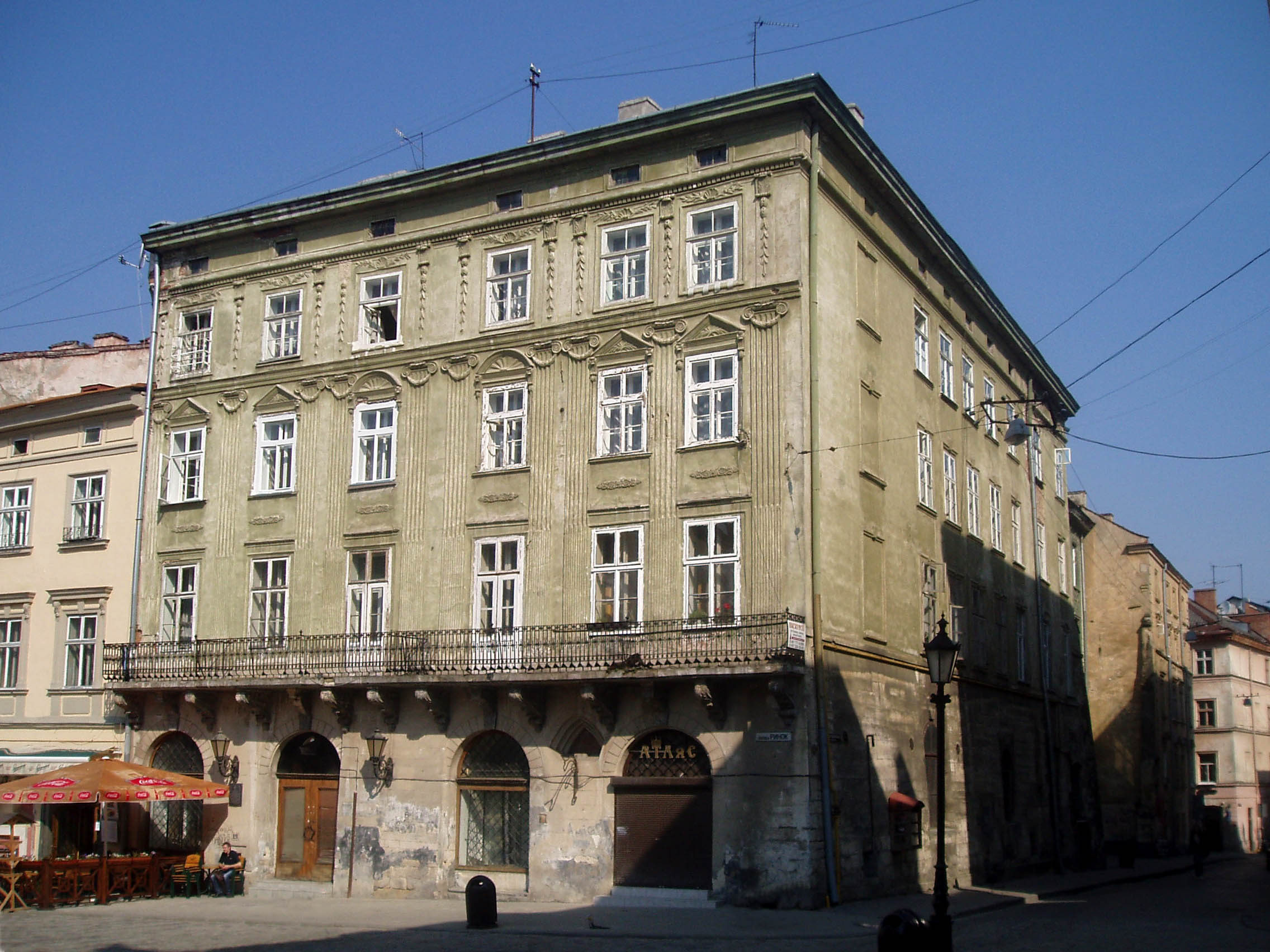
The house “Under the Deer”, where the first pharmacy was located

Medieval doctors and pharmacists commonly used bloodletting and cupping therapy, as well as various powders and ointments. They prescribed Hungarian wine, honey, crushed amber dissolved in milk, nuts in vinegar, and tinctures and extracts of ruta, saffron, cinnamon, cloves, sage, amethyst, garlic, green ruta with salt, dog lungs, and lard from various animals. They also put onions on their bodies. During epidemics, people in Lviv buried themselves in pus, burned it so that the smoke could reach their homes, hammered aspen stakes into holes, stuck a wooden stick in the door, and hung horse skulls on the roofs.

Many Lviv apothecaries were fond of alchemy, but the Church had a negative attitude toward it and persecuted such "researchers" as sorcerers. Lviv alchemists maintained contacts with their "colleagues" in Prague and Germany. In April 1578, Stephen Bathory, who was a guest in Lviv, sent a Lviv citizen Boyanovsky (apparently also an alchemist) to the Berlin alchemist Leonard Turnesser to bring the king an antidote that he had tested on himself. The alchemist was Andrei Torosovich, a brother of the Armenian Archbishop Nicholas Torosovich, who had equipped his laboratory in his own house on Virmenska Street.

== See also ==
- Crime and law in medieval Lviv

== Bibliography ==
- Biryulov, Yu. (2008). Архітектура Львова. Час і стилі ХІІІ-ХХІ ст [Architecture of Lviv. Time and styles of the thirteenth and 20th centuries.] (in Ukrainian). Львів: Центр Європи. p. 720. ISBN 978-966-7022-77-8.
- Dubnov, S. (2003). Краткая история евреев [A brief history of the Jews] (in Russian). Ростов-на-Дону: Феникс. p. 576. ISBN 5-222-03451-8.
- Zayats, О. (2012). Громадяни Львова XIV-XVIII ст.: правовий статус, склад, походження [Lviv Citizens of the 14th and 18th Centuries: Legal Status, Composition, and Origin] (in Russian). Львів: Інститут української археографії та джерелознавства ім. М. С. Грушевського НАН України. p. 558. ISBN 978-966-02-6391-8.
- Isayevich Ya., Litvin M., Stebliy F. (2006). Історія Львова [Lviv's History] (in Ukrainian). Vol. 1. Львів: Центр Європи, Інститут українознавства ім. І. Крип’якевича НАН України. p. 296. ISBN 966-7022-59-5.
- Kapral, M. (2010a). Привілеї національних громад міста Львова (XIV-XVIII ст.) [Privileges of national communities in Lviv (14th-18th centuries)] (in Ukrainian). Львів: Львівський національний університет ім. І. Франка. p. 576.
- Kapral, M. (2010b). Привілеї міста Львова (XIV-XVIII ст.) [Place privileges: the city of Lviv (14th-18th centuries)] (in Ukrainian). Львів: Львівський національний університет ім. І. Франка. p. 544.
- Kapral, M. (2013). Економічні привілеї міста Львова XV-XVIII ст.: привілеї та статути ремісничих цехів і купецьких корпорацій [Economic Privileges of the City of Lviv in the 15th-18th Centuries: Privileges and Charters of Craftsmen's Workshops and Merchant Corporations] (in Ukrainian). Львів: Львівський національний університет ім. І. Франка. p. 815. ISBN 978-966-02-4312-5.
- Kachor, І. (2009). Середньовічний Львів. Фортифікації [Medieval Lviv. Fortifications.] (in Ukrainian). Львів: Апріорі. ISBN 978-966-2154-22-1.
- Kozak L., Tuchapsky Ya. (2000). Храми Львова [Lviv's temples] (in Ukrainian). Львів. p. 173.
- Kozitsky A., Bilostotsky S. (2001). Кримінальний світ старого Львова [The criminal world of old Lviv] (in Ukrainian). Львів: Aфіша. p. 230. ISBN 966-7760-90-1.
- Kozitsky A., Pidkova I. (2007). Енциклопедія Львова [Lviv Encyclopedia] (in Ukrainian). Vol. 1. Львів: Літопис. p. 656.
- Kozitsky, A. (2008). Енциклопедія Львова [Lviv Encyclopedia] (in Ukrainian). Vol. 2. Львів: Літопис. p. 608. ISBN 978-966-7007-69-0.
- Kozitsky, A. (2010). Енциклопедія Львова [Lviv Encyclopedia] (in Ukrainian). Vol. 3. Львів: Літопис. p. 736.
- Kozitsky, A. (2012). Енциклопедія Львова [Lviv Encyclopedia] (in Ukrainian). Vol. 3. Львів: Літопис. p. 816. ISBN 978-966-8853-23-4.
- Kosminsky, E. (1952). История Средних веков [History of the Middle Ages] (in Russian). Москва: Политиздат. p. 748.
- Lipka, R. (1983). Ансамбль вулиці Вірменської [The ensemble of Virmenska Street] (in Ukrainian). Львів: Каменяр. p. 110.
- Lozinsky, R. (2005). Етнічний склад населення Львова [Ethnic composition of Lviv's population] (in Ukrainian). Львів: Львівський національний університет ім. І. Франка. p. 358. ISBN 966-613-378-4.
- Matskeviy, L. (2008). Археологічні пам'ятки Львова [Archaeological sights of Lviv] (in Ukrainian). Львів: Логос. p. 224.
- Melnik, B. (2001). Довідник перейменувань вулиць і площ Львова. XIII—XX ст [A guide to the renaming of streets and squares in Lviv. 13rh-20th centuries] (in Ukrainian). Львів: Світ. p. 128. ISBN 966-603-115-9.
- Melnik, B. (2006). Вулицями старовинного Львова [Through the streets of ancient Lviv] (in Ukrainian). Львів: Світ. p. 272. ISBN 966-603-393-3.
- Melnik I., Masik R. (2012). Пам'ятники та меморіальні таблиці міста Львова [Monuments and memorial plaques of Lviv] (in Ukrainian). Львів: Апріорi. p. 320. ISBN 978-617-629-077-3.
- Melnik I. (2012). Галицьке передмістя та південно-східні околиці Королівського столичного міста Львова [Galician suburbs and southeastern outskirts of the Royal Capital City of Lviv] (in Ukrainian). Львів: Апріорі. p. 352. ISBN 978-617-629-076-6.
- Melnik, І. (2010). Довкола Високого Замку. Шляхами і вулицями жовківського передмістя та північних околиць міста Львова [Around the High Castle. The roads and streets of the Zhovkva suburb and the northern outskirts of Lviv] (in Ukrainian). Львів: Апріорі. p. 287. ISBN 978-966-215432-0.
- Melnik І. (2009). Львівський Новий Світ та південні околиці королівського столичного міста Галичини від Святого Юра до Наварії [Lviv's New World and the southern outskirts of the royal capital city of Galicia from St. George to Navarre] (in Ukrainian). Львів: Центр Європи. p. 287. ISBN 978-966-7022-82-2.
- Melnik I. (2008). Львівські вулиці і кам'яниці, мури, передмістя та інші особливості королівського столичного міста Галичини [Lviv streets and houses, walls, suburbs, and other features of the royal capital city of Galicia] (in Ukrainian). Львів: Центр Європи. p. 384. ISBN 978-966-7022-79-2.
- Melnik I., Zagayska R. (2010). Личаківське передмістя та східні околиці королівського столичного міста Львова [Lychakiv suburb and eastern outskirts of the royal capital city of Lviv] (in Ukrainian). Львів: Центр Європи. p. 352. ISBN 978-966-7022-88-4.
- Ovsiychuk, V. (1966). Львовская живопись XVI-XVIII в.в. Автореферат [Lviv painting of the 16th-18th centuries] (in Russian). Ленинград. p. 29.
- Ovsiychyk, V. (1969). Архітектурні пам'ятки Львова [Architectural monuments of Lviv] (in Ukrainian). Львів: Каменяр. p. 169.
- Ostrovsky, G. (1982). Львов [Lviv] (in Russian). Ленинград: Искусство. p. 239.
- Ostrovsky, G. (1978). Художественные музеи Львова [Lviv Art Museums] (in Russian). Ленинград: Искусство. p. 211.
- Palkov, T. (2007). Львов. Путеводитель [Lviv. Guidebook.] (in Russian). Львов: Ладекс. p. 103. ISBN 978-966-8233-03-6.
- Pshik, V. (2008). Укріплені міста, замки, оборонні двори та інкастельовані сакральні споруди Львівщини XIII-XVIII ст [Fortified towns, castles, defensive courtyards, and encastled sacred buildings of the Lviv region in the 13th and 18th centuries] (in Ukrainian). Львів: Дизайн-студія. p. 239. ISBN 978-966-8095-03-0.
- Sekretaryuk, V. (1984). Історія Львова. — Київ: Наукова думка, 1984. — 412 с. [Lviv's History] (in Ukrainian). Київ: Наукова думка. p. 412.
- Tregubova T., Mikh R. (1989). Львів. Архітектурно-історичний нарис [Lviv. Architectural and historical essay.] (in Ukrainian). Київ: Будівельник. p. 272. ISBN 5-7705-0178-2.
- Kharchishin, O. (2011). Український пісенний фольклор в етнокультурі Львова: трансформаційні процеси, міжкультурні пограниччя [Ukrainian Song Folklore in the Ethnic Culture of Lviv: Transformational Processes and Intercultural Borderlands] (in Ukrainian). Львів: Простір-М. p. 368. ISBN 978-966-02-6118-1.
- Yakimovich, B. (1992). Історія українського війська [The history of the Ukrainian army] (in Ukrainian). Львів: Світ. p. 712.
- Історія Львова в документах і матеріалах [The history of Lviv in documents and materials] (in Ukrainian). Київ: Наукова думка. 1986. p. 420.
- История городов и сёл Украинской ССР в 26 томах. Львовская область [History of cities and villages of the Ukrainian SSR in 26 volumes. Lviv region] (in Russian). Киев: Украинская советская энциклопедия. 1978. p. 795.
- Mańkowski, T. (1936). Lwowski cech malarzy w XVI i XVII wieku [Lviv painting guild in the 16th and 17th centuries] (in Polish). Lwów. p. 150.
