= Crime and law in medieval Lviv =

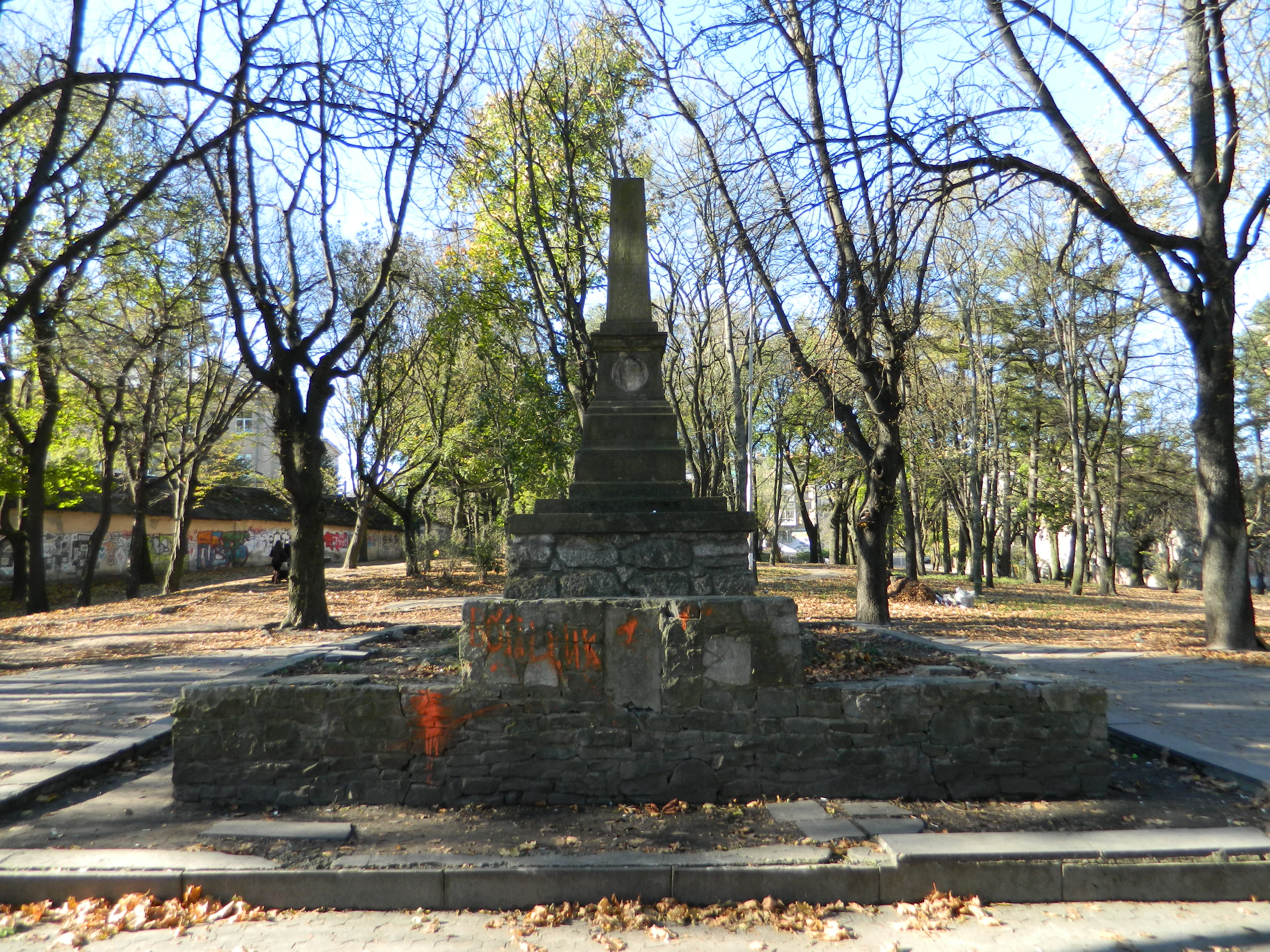
Square and memorial sign at the site of the medieval Hill of Executions

Crime and justice in medieval Lviv played an important role in the townspeople's public life and served as a topic of constant interest for the inhabitants. The wealthy trading city of Lviv attracted not only foreign merchants and artisans but also criminals of all kinds. However, the criminal world of medieval Lviv, which had its regional peculiarities, was characterized by hostility to unmotivated cruelty. Serious criminal crimes were rather the exception to the rule, and they were mainly committed by representatives of the nobility and outsiders. The most common offenses were fraud, counterfeiting coins and various goods, gambling, hooliganism, thefts, and prostitution. The crime rate increased during periods of wars, economic crises, and political instability, which were usually accompanied by social unrest and a decline in morals.

The Lviv magistrate consisted of the city council (rada or rada) and the city court (lava), which dealt mainly with criminal cases. Although the council was an administrative body, the vagueness of the legislation often led to its functions overlapping with those of the court. Members of the city council (rajcy or consuls) exercised police supervision, distributed city lands, leased city property and its profitable spheres of activity, set taxes, admitted to city rights (citizenship), and resolved disputes that did not require the involvement of witnesses. In addition, the burgomaster (burgomaster or proconsul) and rajcy fought against gambling, monitored traders to ensure they did not deceive or shortchange buyers, and prices to prevent profiteering by resellers. Rajcy did not receive money for their work, which was considered honorable, but they did not pay royal and city taxes on their real estate, were exempt from a number of duties, and received various gifts. Burgomasters had the right to independently administer justice and resolve disputes, even at their own homes, and through them, petitions and appeals were submitted to the royal chancellery.

== Crime ==
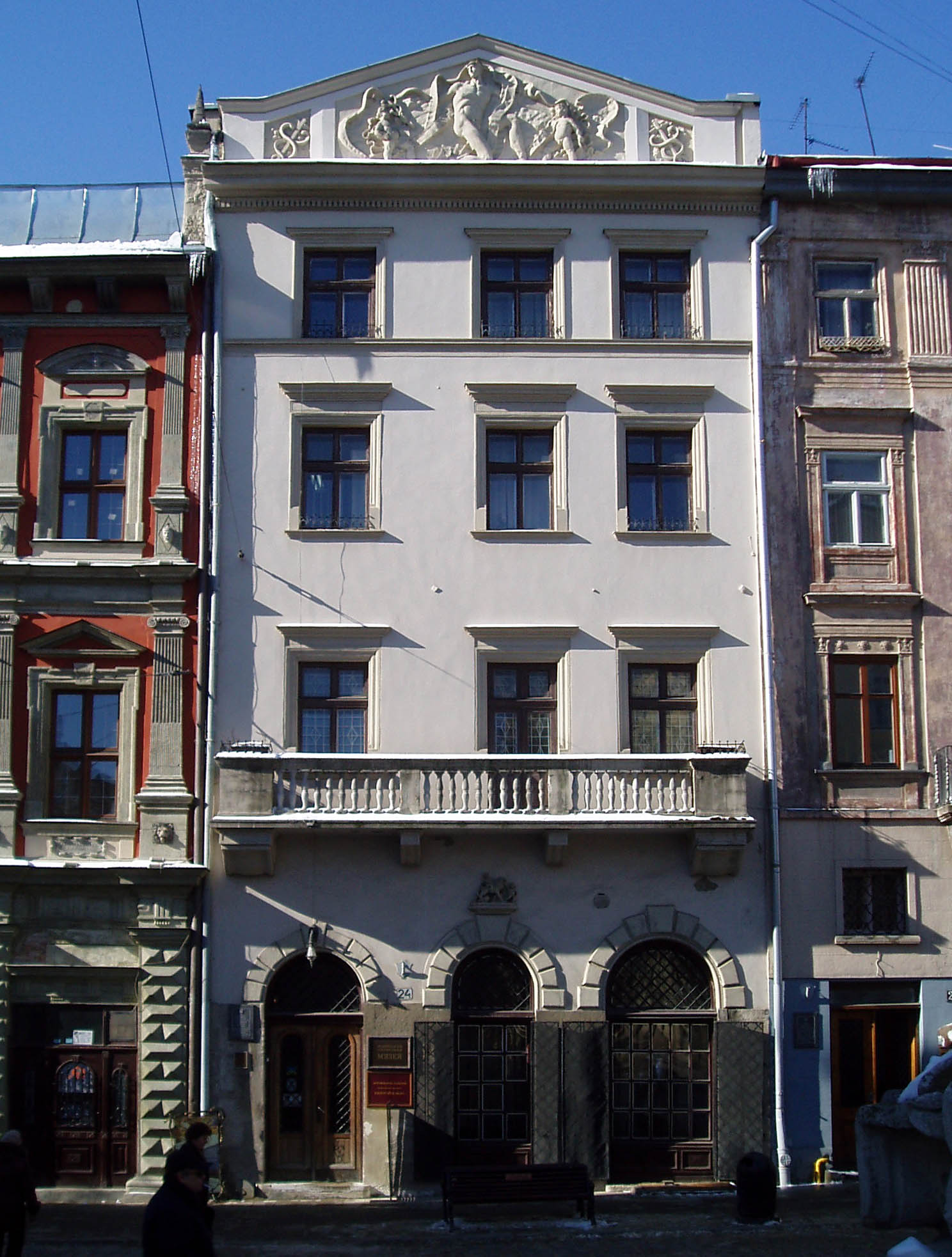
Massarowska townhouse

The legislation of the 14th–16th centuries distinguished crimes committed against the magistrate and the Church (blasphemy, heresy, witchcraft), against the life and health of citizens (murder, robbery, infliction of bodily harm), against public morals (prostitution, sodomy, rape, and bigamy). The most common in medieval Lviv were property crimes (thefts, robberies, frauds, and non-repayment of debts), followed by crimes against faith. Priests explained the appearance of famine, epidemics, and venereal diseases by blasphemy, severely punishing the guilty, up to burning at the stake. According to statistics, thefts of sacred objects from churches were mainly committed by men, while witchcraft was committed by women (herbalism and fortune-telling, which had no negative consequences, were not considered offenses at all).

Serious crimes (murders and armed robberies) were a relatively rare phenomenon in medieval Lviv. Laws distinguished murder in self-defense and accidental murder (or manslaughter). A crime against public peace and city authority was considered the murder of a guard while performing his duties or murder with a mercenary motive. It was not uncommon for mothers, due to poverty, shame, fear of parental punishment, or fear of losing their job, to kill their newborn children (mainly unmarried women and maidservants). Abortion was also considered murder. In addition, attempting to terminate a pregnancy using harmful products and drinks, and leaving an infant unattended were considered crimes.

The concept of sexual crimes was interpreted very broadly in medieval law. For example, the term "sodomy" combined masturbation, homosexuality, lesbianism, bestiality, necrophilia, sexual contacts "in an unnatural way," and sexual contacts between Christians and non-Christians. According to the Constitutio Criminalis Carolina, those found guilty of the "sodomite sin" were to be burned at the stake. In 1518, a widowed Armenian and an unmarried Catholic woman were burned in Lviv for interconfessional sexual relations. Marital infidelities often ended in court cases where compensation for moral damages was demanded from lovers.

In Lviv, livestock and horses were often stolen, with which merchants arrived in the city; petty thefts committed by servants in their masters' homes were common. Theft cases increased during epidemics when the homes of wealthy citizens were left unattended. Court archives contain cases of looting rich Jewish graves. Armed gangs robbed merchant caravans and lone travelers on the roads leading to Lviv, less often in the suburbs, sometimes attacking suburban villages and outlying estates of the nobility. There were Jewish gangs in the Krakow suburb, many gangs were created by Polish nobles or former soldiers.

Lviv pillory, stored in the "Italian Courtyard" of the Korniakt Palace
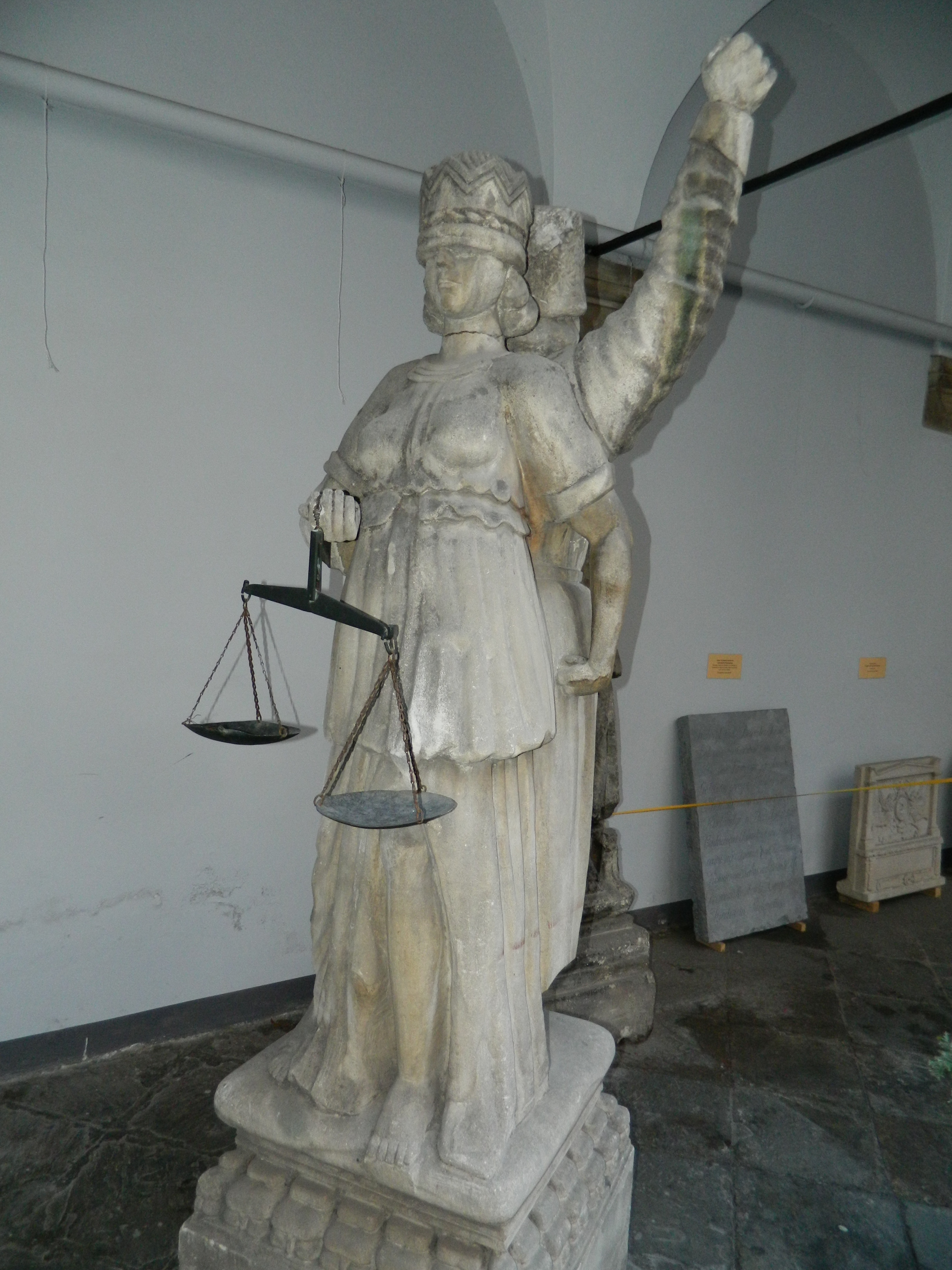
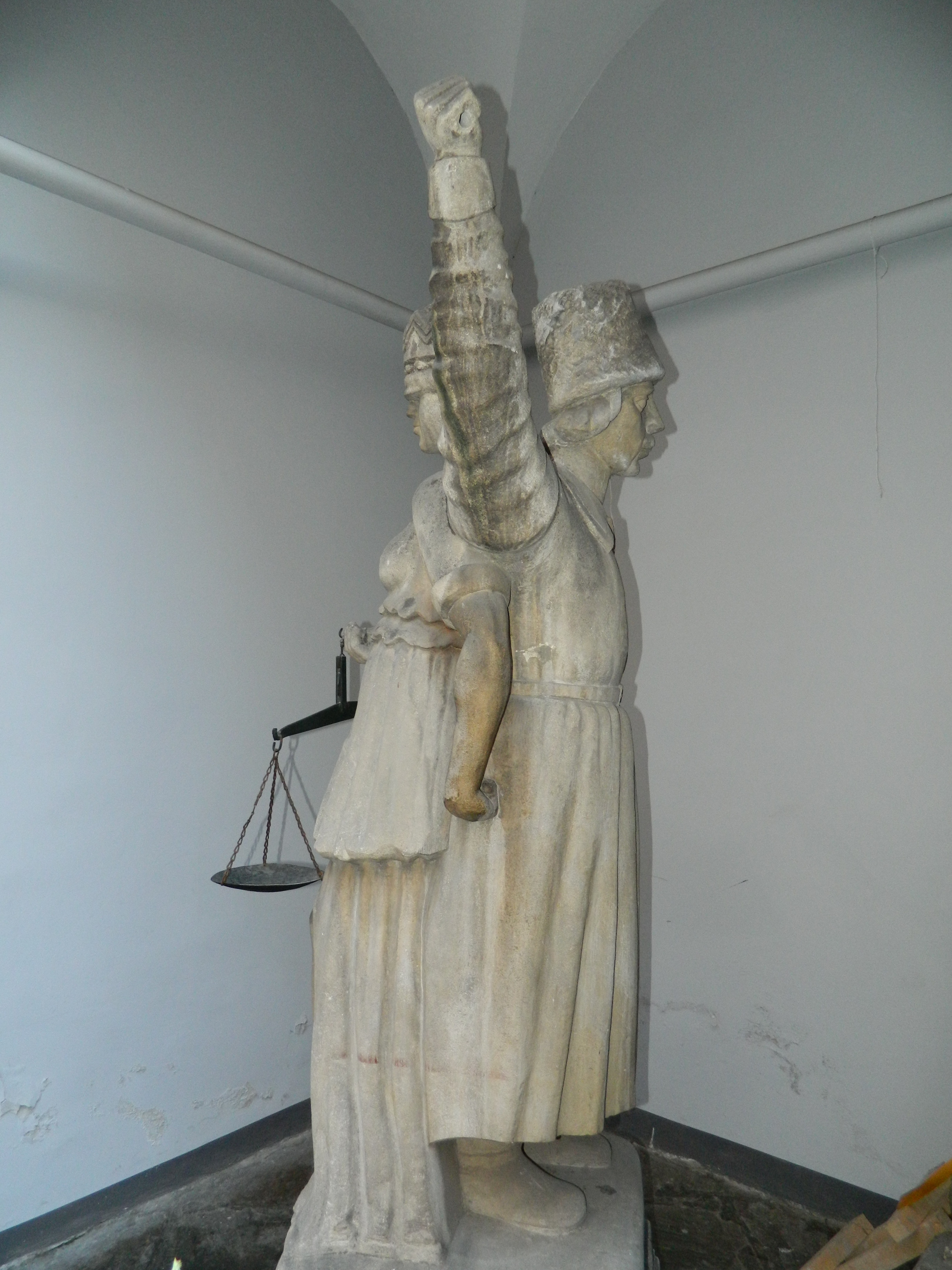
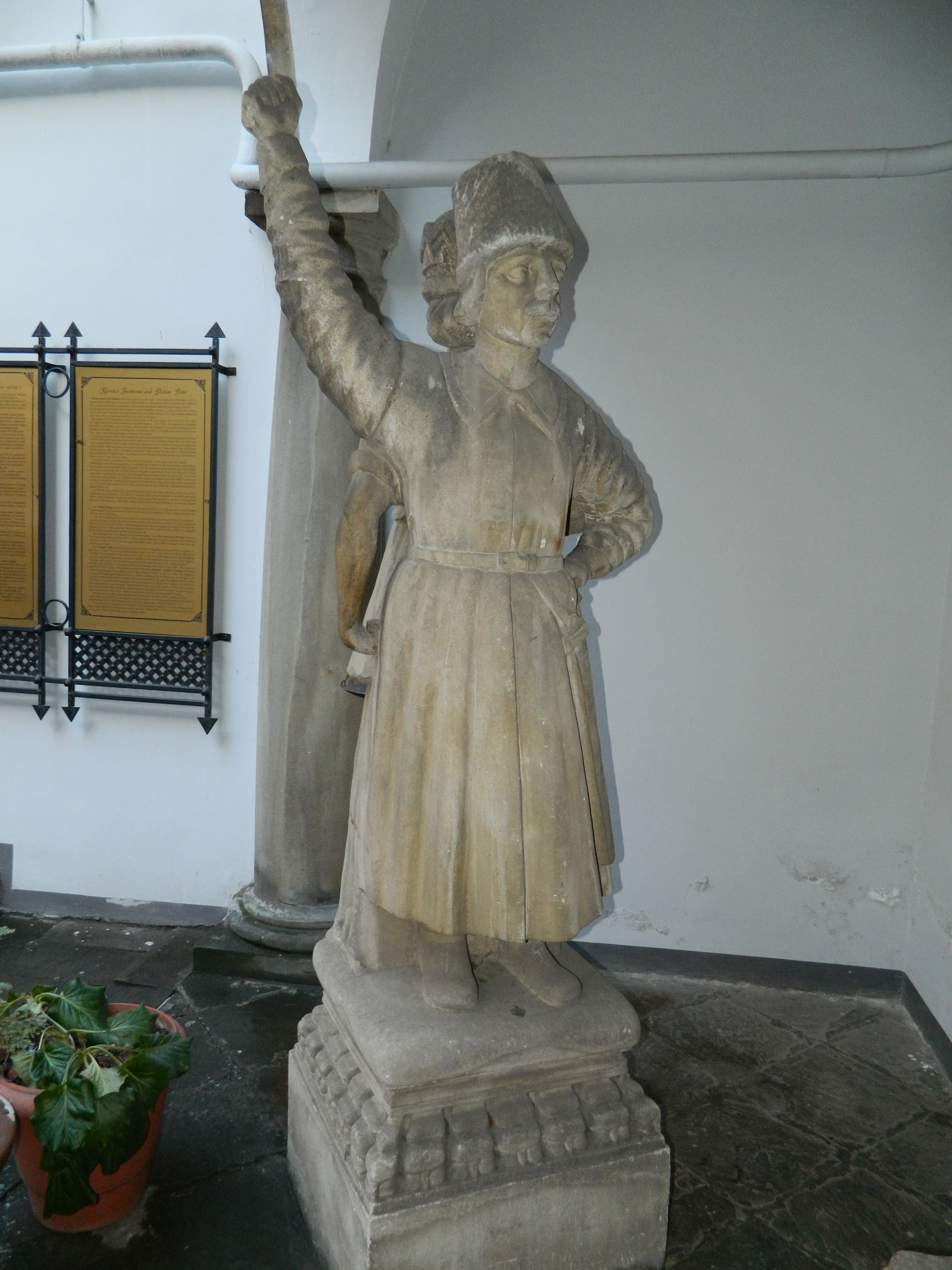

Street hooliganism and murders in fights were common in medieval Lviv, usually committed in a state of severe alcohol intoxication. Fights between servants of different lords, between burghers and nobility, between garrison soldiers and city guards, fights over debts, gambling, women, and even fights involving priests were not uncommon. In 1537, Greta Kokhnova and her daughter Małgorzata severely beat the rector of the Lviv cathedral school, master of jurisprudence Jan Tucholczyk (moreover, the women, thanks to lawyer Mateusz Kaszer, even won the court case where Tucholczyk demanded three thousand Hungarian gold coins from them as compensation). In 1578, on Rynok Square in the presence of King Stephen Báthory himself, field clerk Wacław Wąsowicz and rotmistrz Temruk fought. In 1580, at the Anna Łącka's wedding, representatives of two famous and respected Lviv families fought: Urban Ubaldini and Paweł Jeleonek.

At the end of the 16th–beginning of the 17th century, the criminal situation in Lviv got worse. The city and suburbs were flooded with adventurers and mercenaries gathering here into detachments for campaigns to the Tsardom of Russia, Wallachia, and the northern borders of the Ottoman Empire. Often, after revelries, mercenaries committed rapes, robberies, and even murders.

There were many abuses in the profitable alcohol trade. Unscrupulous tavern keepers diluted and short-poured beer, mead, and wine; some merchants smuggled cheap beer from the suburbs and expensive Hungarian wines into the city (brewing beer was allowed only within the city walls, and the transportation of imported wine was a monopoly of the magistrate). Many tavern owners mixed high-quality Hungarian wines with cheaper varieties from Wallachia and used special containers that held less drink than the norm. To combat this, the position of controller was established in Lviv, who monitored the volume of barrels, bottles, and mugs, fining violators. As claimed by Polish ethnographer and medieval historian Jan Stanisław Bystron, drunkenness was extremely widespread in Polish cities. To prevent the use of furniture in drunken fights, benches in taverns were made very massive and heavy.

Riots on religious grounds were most often directed against the Jewish community of Lviv. However, open attacks on the Jewish quarter almost did not occur during the High Middle Ages, but began only in the Late Middle Ages – in 1572 and 1592 (Jewish pogroms, known in Lviv as tumults, became even more frequent in the 17th–18th centuries). The main instigators of the pogroms were students of the cathedral school. Jews were forced to buy off the rioting Catholic youth, giving both money and goods. Lviv Jews who were tavern keepers and moneylenders suffered the most, having a bad reputation due to the peculiarities of their professions.

During the princely period of Lviv's history, many sorcerers, soothsayers, and fortune-tellers lived in the city. In the Krakow suburb lived the Armenian warlock and master of alchemy Dmitry, known far beyond the city. People even came from Western Europe to study with him. Information has been preserved about the visit to Lviv by the Prague alchemist Bartholomew and the German warlock Leonard, who asked Dmitry to share with them the secret of obtaining the "philosopher's stone". Dmitry kept his knowledge secret but gave the guests a letter of recommendation to a certain "Greek school" located near Tabriz.

Many Lviv alchemists engaged in apothecary business, selling their clients not only medicines but also sugar, spices, "protective" amulets, and "miraculous" potions. Another popular group was astrologers, magicians, mystics, and other esoterics, among whom foreigners predominated. But the time of their triumph came after the end of the Middle Ages (in the 16th century, the Maltese Friedrich Joachim Megelino shone in Lviv, in the 18th century the city was visited by the famous Alessandro Cagliostro).

=== Prostitution ===
In medieval Lviv, prostitution, although considered a crime and ungodly activity, existed almost legally. Visiting a brothel and trading one's body were immoral phenomena but were not actually punished (some Lviv guilds prescribed in their charters a ban on visiting the "house of debauchery" for members of the association). Already at the beginning of the 15th century, some Lviv prostitutes went to work in Kraków and other Polish cities.

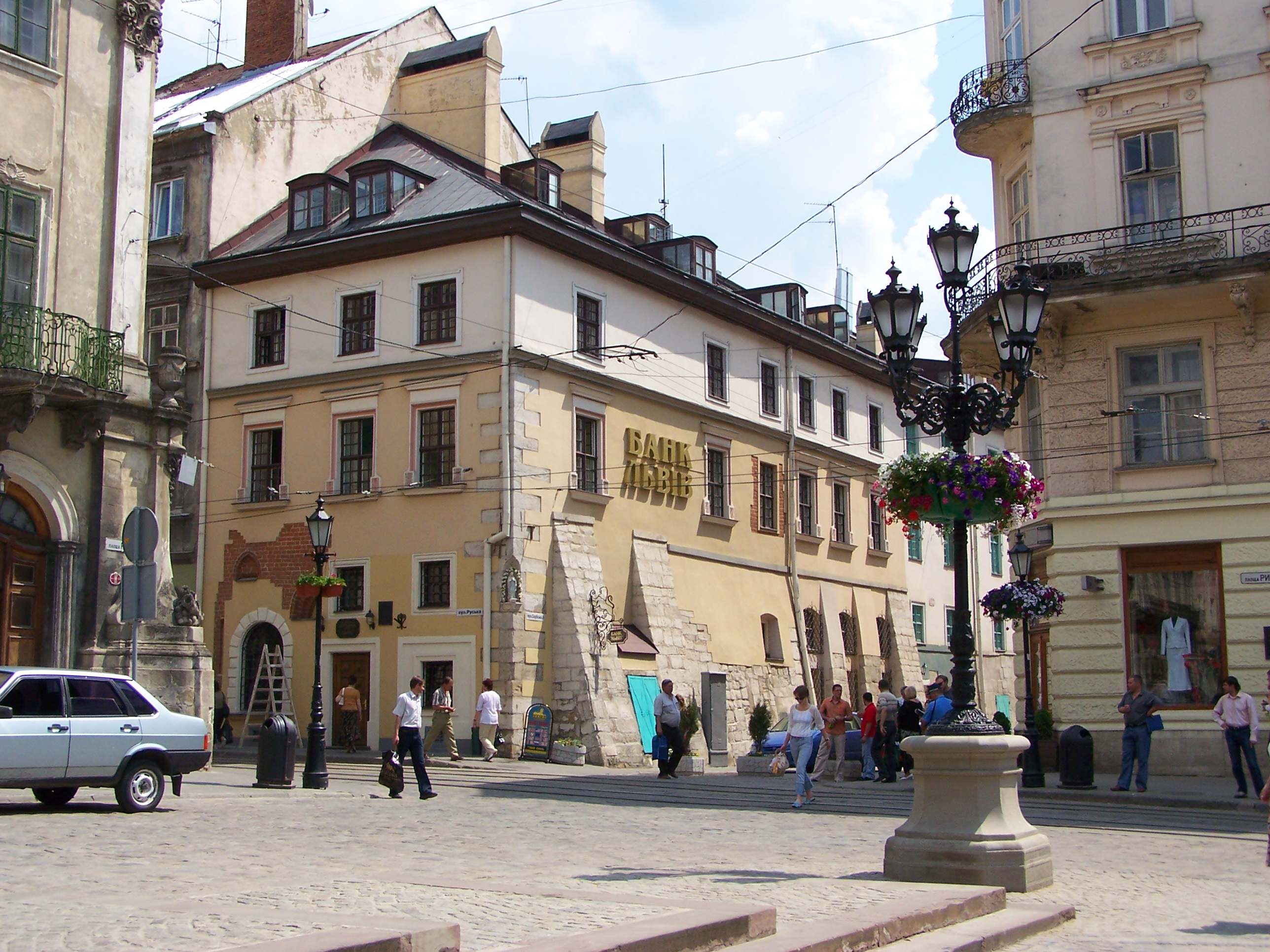
House No. 2 on Ruska Street

The first mention of a Lviv brothel (lupanar) dates back to 1450. In archival documents, there is a record of repairing the water supply in the city brothel, for which 12 groszes were allocated. Another brothel opened in 1473 in the Jewish quarter, on the site of the current ruins of the Golden Rose synagogue. According to archival records, the owner of the brothel was presumably the merchant from Bergamo Rusetto, who lived for a long time in Kaffa and was engaged in slave trade. He transported caravans of slaves through Lviv several times, mainly from Abkhazia, Mingrelia, and the Balkans. Another well-known slave trader was also an Italian, Giannetto Lomellino from Genoa, who in 1474 bought a batch of women from Rusetto and received special permission to export the slaves from the city.

In the 16th century, a popular lupanar was located near the city arsenal, opposite the horse mill. Previously, it was a rural tavern, which was bought with magistrate funds, dismantled, transported to Lviv, and reassembled here. The building burned down during the fire of 1571, but a detailed description of it has been preserved (around the main room were six "working" rooms, the brothel had two exits to reduce the likelihood of guests meeting each other). After the fire, the "merry house" temporarily moved to the tower of the Ribbon Makers and Turners at the arsenal, and then was located in the house of Yuri Wojnar (modern house No. 2 on Ruska Street).

The Krakow suburb was also famous for brothels, where the main clients were visiting merchants and employees of the Low Castle (the fame of the local lupanars, but already in the 17th century, was written about in one of his poems by the famous Polish poet Jan Andrzej Morsztyn).

=== Gambling ===
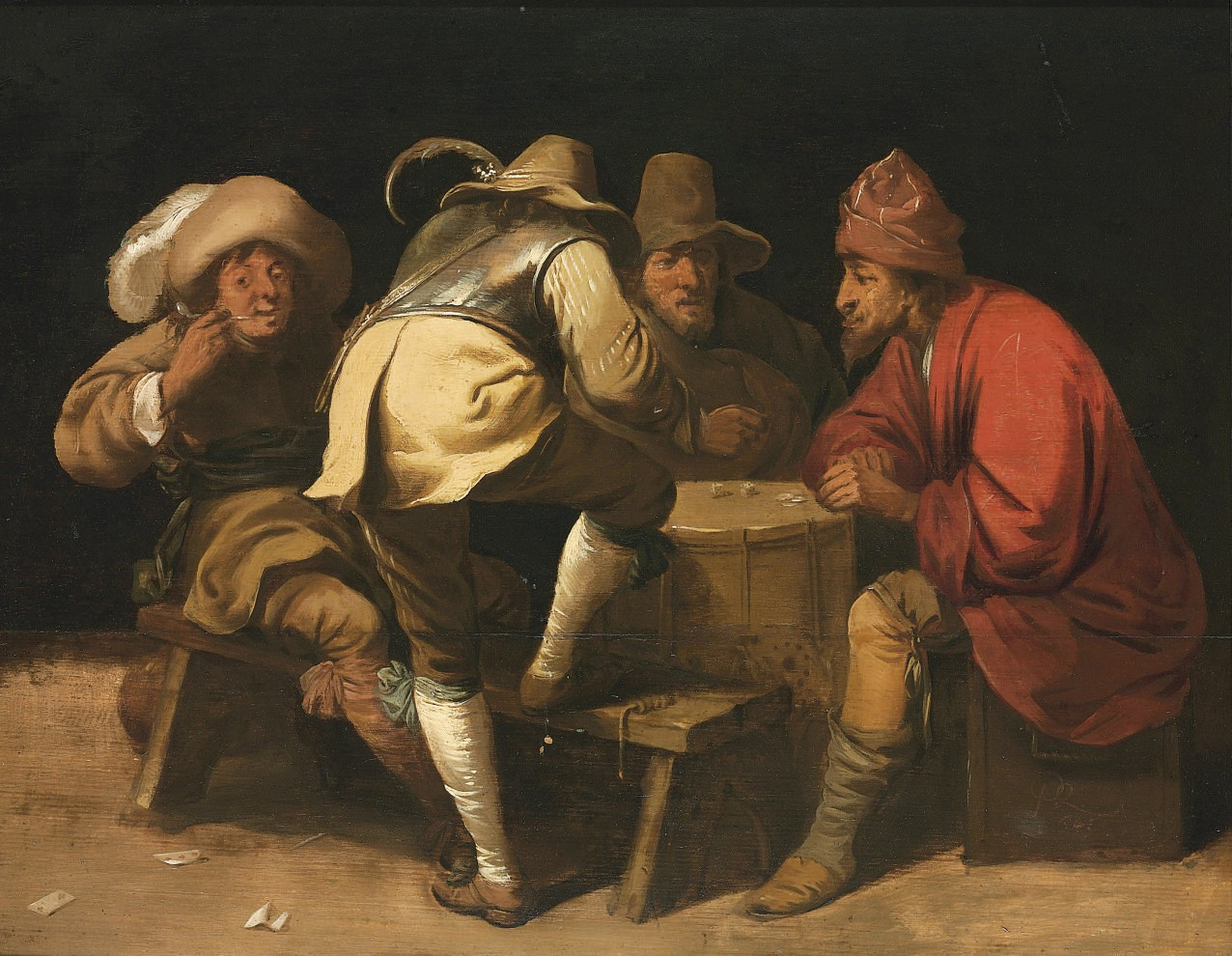
Soldiers playing dice. 1643 painting

From the mid-14th century in the Kingdom of Poland, including in Galicia, the game of dice began to gain popularity. In 1387, the Lviv magistrate issued a special order prohibiting dice games for money within the city walls. If detected, violators were fined 48 groszes, and all players had to return the won amounts to each other. Tavern keepers in whose drinking establishments the game was conducted were punished even more severely: after two warnings, the magistrate took away their trading rights and closed the tavern. Despite prohibitions and moral condemnation, dice remained a common entertainment among soldiers and the city lower classes throughout the Middle Ages.

In Lviv, there was a group of professional "dice players" (cheaters in dice games), and in Polish, the name "koster" eventually transferred to professional card players (only in the 16th century did the German word "sharper" begin to spread). To deceive a partner, a die with a cavity filled with mercury was used. Thus, the cheater's die always landed on the winning side. Having dice in a private home used for divination and predicting the future was not considered reprehensible.

Card games spread in Lviv in the 16th century. Colored playing cards came to Poland from the Middle East through Germany and Czechia. In the poem Roxolania published in 1584 in Kraków, Sebastian Fabian Klonowicz tells about the popularity of card games in Galicia, that card players played for flicks, nuts, and money, and about varieties of cheating at that time (mentions "random witnesses" who intervened in disputes during the game or peeked at players' cards and signaled them to their accomplices using a system of conditional signals). Like dice, cards were considered a game of the city lower classes and in the Middle Ages had not yet become an attribute of secular salons. Decks of cards of various types (German, French, Kraków, and Wrocław) were sold in bookstores and shops with household goods.

=== Beggars and paupers ===
From 1471, Lviv had an official community of beggars (żebraki or didy), who gathered "na Bajkach" (in the area of modern Kyivska Street). Beggars asked for alms near churches, monasteries, and cemeteries both in the city and suburbs (the highest concentration was observed near the St. George's Cathedral and the Church of St. Stanislaus), as well as near roadside crosses and figures installed on trade routes to Lviv. Public law regulated the position of beggars in the constitution of 1496. They were divided into three categories: those whom the city officially allowed to beg; those who could not work due to physical or mental disabilities; and those who did not want to work honestly and earned by deception. The first two categories were left alone by the authorities, while the latter were detained and sent to repair city fortifications (if there were too many "illegal" beggars in the city, the wójt was fined heavily).

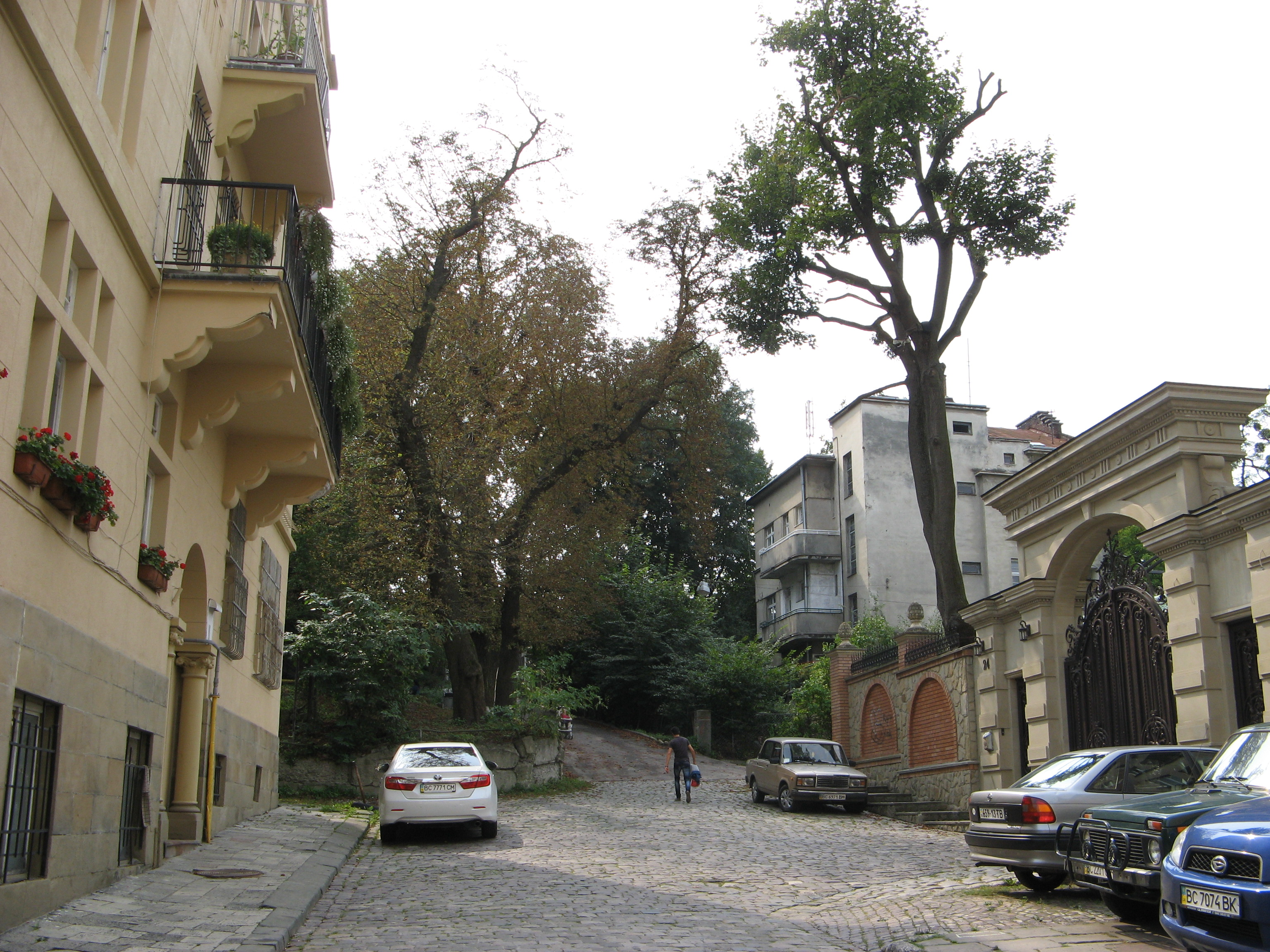
Kalicha Hora Street

At the beginning of the 16th century, Lviv already had a corporation of beggars with its own emblem and the right to keep a guild book (this was the only city professional association that did not discriminate against its members based on religious or national affiliation). (Note: The only restriction for Rusyns was the ban on visiting the city bathhouse.) In 1515, the position of "women's wójt" (also called "elder of the poor" or "elder of the grandfathers") was introduced in Lviv. Elected from among their own, he headed the Lviv paupers, vagrants, and beggars, and also expelled outsider beggars beyond the city limits, receiving three groszes a week from the magistrate for this. Traditional places of residence for beggars were Żebracza Hora (now Akademika Kolessy Street) and Kalicha Hora (now the street of the same name) in the area of the modern citadel, as well as the Krakow suburb. The most successful days for paupers were when a church was founded, a military victory was celebrated, a state or religious holiday, or when a high guest arrived in Lviv. There was a widespread belief that a person who did not give alms to a beggar could fall ill.

In Lviv's hospitals (almshouses), paupers were provided with temporary overnight stays. All monasteries and Catholic monastic orders of the city (especially Franciscans, Dominicans, and Bernardines) fed beggars and paupers with lunches or dinners, distributed bread, and transferred donations to the magistrate for the poor. The largest shelters in Lviv were the hospital at the Church of St. Elizabeth on the site of modern Ivan Pidkova Square (from the beginning of the 15th century it was known as the Hospital of the Holy Spirit) and the Monastery of St. Lazarus on Kalicha Hora (at the beginning of the 17th century moved to its current location). Only during times when Lviv was threatened by epidemics did the authorities clear the city of crowds of paupers. In 1548, the position of supervisor for compliance with sanitary norms was introduced, who in the morning, accompanied by guards, drove beggars outside the city walls. The Sejm constitution of 1588 confirmed the provisions of the 1496 constitution and additionally introduced responsibility for magistrate officials for insufficient fight against "illegal" beggars.

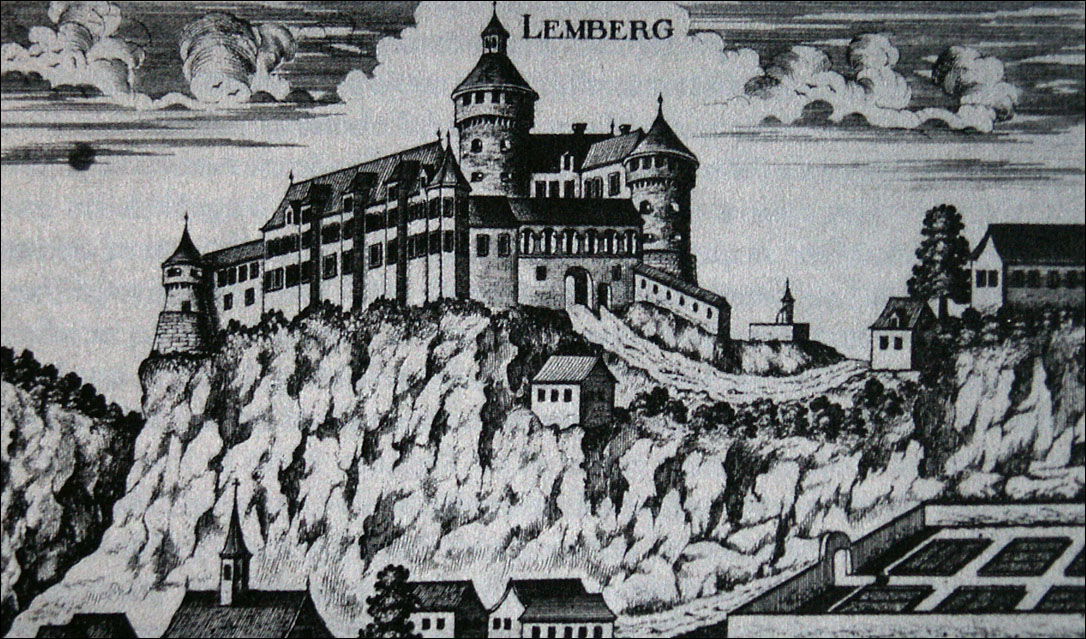
Depiction of the High Castle. 17th century

Depending on the method of begging for alms, beggars were divided into several groups. The most numerous were cripples and invalids who claimed to have received injuries either in war or in Muslim captivity for refusing to renounce Christianity. Another category begged for "ransom" from Turkish captivity for relatives or even themselves, "released on parole" (such beggars demonstrated shackles in which they were allegedly held and various documents in unknown languages).

The religious-mystical direction was represented by paupers hung with icons and amulets who told of their pilgrimage to Palestine or Rome. Along the way, they sold jars with "Jordan water", splinters of the "True Cross" and pebbles from Calvary. Such beggars knew the main church songs and understood questions of religious dogmatics.

A separate category of beggars consisted of lepers, who lived in a shelter outside the city walls (information about it dates back to the beginning of the 15th century). These sick people begged for alms at the city gates, they wore special gloves and used baskets attached to long sticks so as not to approach healthy people. Polish writer Sebastian Fabian Klonowicz wrote a poem Judas's Bag about Galician beggars, in which he detailed all the subtleties of this profession.

=== Theft of property ===
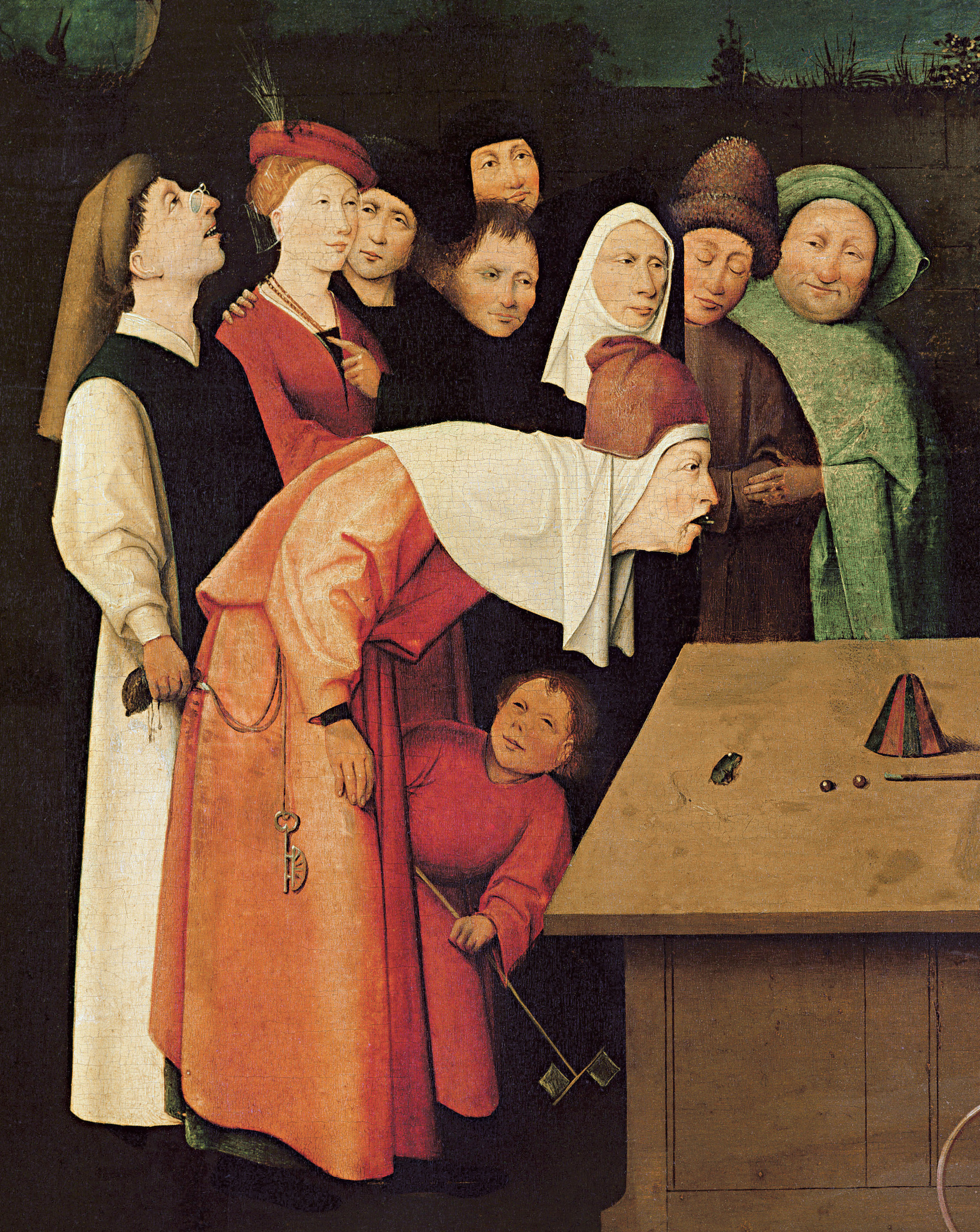
Theft of a purse in a painting by Hieronymus Bosch. 15th century

Medieval legislation paid great attention to property crimes, which were initially united under the general name "theft". Later, in the qualification of crimes, lawyers began to distinguish robberies and banditry. Among the most popular crimes in medieval Lviv were thefts of personal property and horse theft. According to calculations by Polish historian Adam Karpiński, crimes against property accounted for about 60% of all crimes committed in Lviv in the 16th–17th centuries. Moreover, if earlier attacks involving violence dangerous to the life or health of the victim were considered rare, by the end of the Middle Ages, robberies already accounted for almost a quarter of all property crimes.

Lviv city authorities considered all persons arriving in the city without a specific profession and accompanying documents as potential offenders. The magistrate repeatedly appealed to Lviv residents not to let unknown strangers into their homes. However, many citizens took in strangers hoping to earn money by renting a corner or room.

Among the high-profile crimes of the 16th century stands out the complaint of Moldavian hospodar Peter IV Rareș to the Lviv magistrate against burgher Senko Popowicz (1541), who allegedly robbed the ruler of a large sum while at court. The list of stolen items included 12 caftans with gold buttons (each worth 20 thousand aspres), two sabers and four daggers with precious finishes, a gold goblet valued at 50 Hungarian ducats, and a bag of coins. The city conducted its own investigation and acquitted Popowicz, who received a royal charter prohibiting further prosecution in this case.

In the 16th century, the Krakow suburb was "famous" for its robbers and bandits. For example, Dawid's gang nicknamed "Confederate" robbed passers-by and caravans along the busy road to Hlyniany. For a time, the criminal "kings" of the Krakow suburb were Abram Dankowicz and Heshel Józef, who in 1591 robbed and killed the wealthy entrepreneur Szymon Solomonowicz in broad daylight. In addition to the bandits themselves, the authorities persecuted and severely punished those who hid and then sold stolen goods.

=== Corruption and noble arbitrariness ===
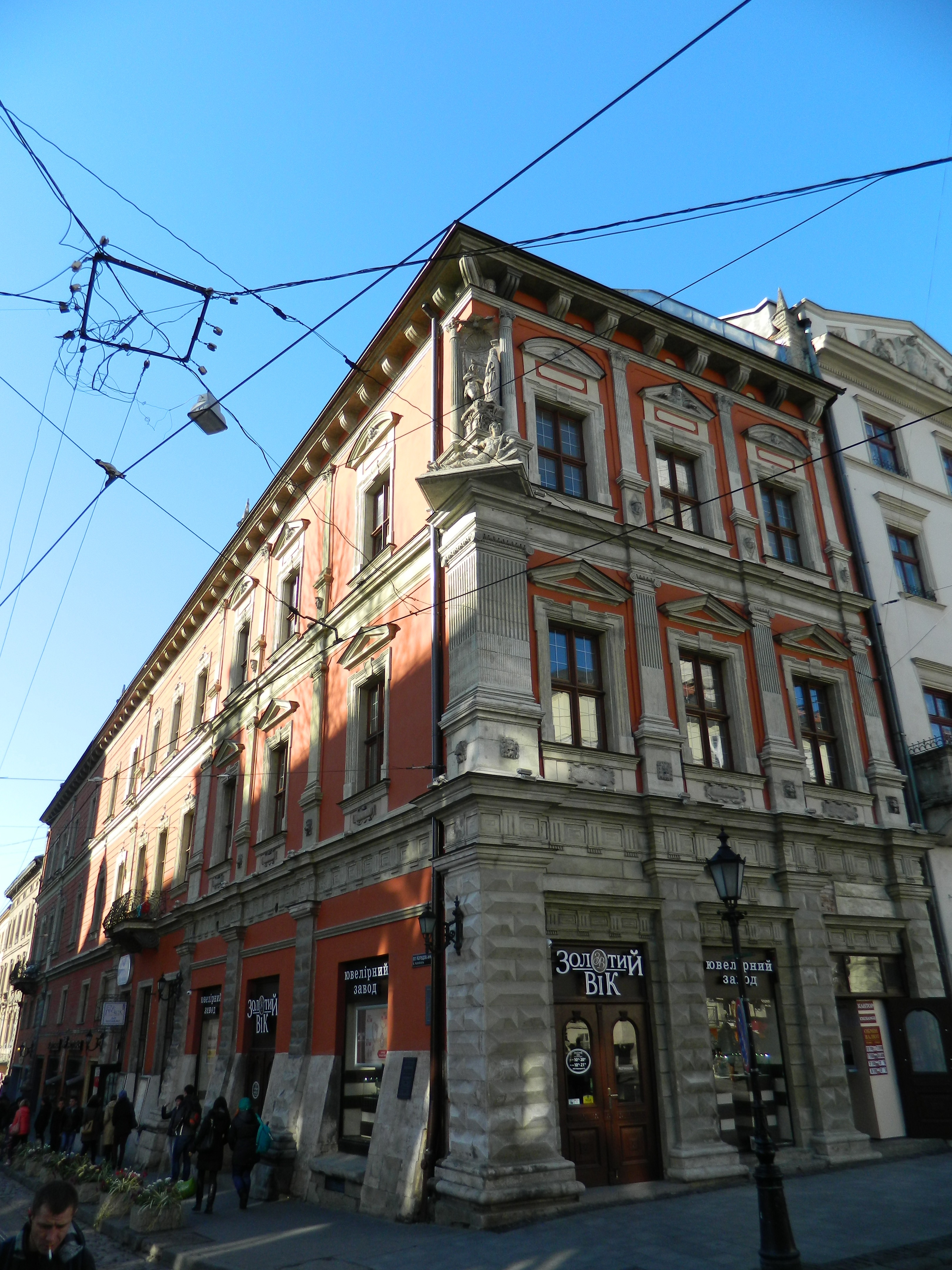
Scholz-Wolfowicz House

The Lviv's city governmental system created favorable opportunities for various abuses. Membership in the magistrate, initially elective, became lifelong from 1519. (Note: After long court disputes in 1577, the king confirmed the lifelong status of city council members. The city community received the opportunity to create a "college of 40 men", which included representatives of merchants and artisans. Although the college was considered a supervisory body, it had no real power. A special commission (longeria) was also created, before which the magistrate reported on the use of funds.) At the same time, the election of new city council members to vacant positions was conducted by acting rajcy (radźca or rajca, analogous to ratmann). The candidate had to have higher education and real estate within the city walls, but the main thing was that he had to pay a significant sum in favor of the acting council members. The elders of the magistrate tried not to accept newcomers into their ranks, preferring relatives of deceased rajcy. Thus, a closed system of dynastic oligarchy formed in the Lviv city council.

The city council obstructed control over expenditures from the Lviv treasury in every possible way. Officials often appropriated city property, used city servants and vehicles for personal purposes. Many rajcy lobbied for the interests of certain breweries and taverns, and also used magistrate carts to transport their own goods. At the same time, fighting for their rights and privileges, rajcy strengthened the self-governing status of the city and limited the power of the nobility and clergy.

In 1576, Lviv residents complained to King Stephen Báthory about burgomaster Wolf Scholz, who placed his relatives in key positions (he made one of his sons wójt, the others rajcy, and his sons-in-law – court assessors). But the greatest scale of abuse of power was reached under the leadership of Paweł Kampian and his son Martin in the magistrate. The Kampians, natives of Koniecpol, settled in Lviv in the mid-16th century. In 1560, Paweł Kampian received city rights, quickly became rich through medical practice, and took the post of burgomaster. By the mid-1590s, he was already one of the richest citizens of Lviv. When the city found itself in a difficult situation, Kampian lent the magistrate a thousand zlotys secured by city mills, further multiplying his capital on this deal. Martin Kampian, who also became burgomaster, in the first third of the 17th century became the largest landowner, moneylender, and holder of Lviv's debts. In addition, he forced artisans and surrounding peasants to work for him, and imprisoned the dissatisfied in the cellars of the town hall and his private prisons (in 1628, a long court process began, ending with Martin being deprived of Lviv citizenship).

Royal starostas of Lviv often distinguished themselves in the field of abuse of power, who, with the help of garrison soldiers and their servants from the Low Castle, extorted goods, products, and monetary offerings from Lviv residents and out-of-town merchants (commandants of the High Castle sometimes engaged in the same). Almost throughout the Middle Ages, Lviv suffered from the arbitrariness of mercenary troops, who, due to irregular payment of salaries, robbed citizens or imposed various levies on them.

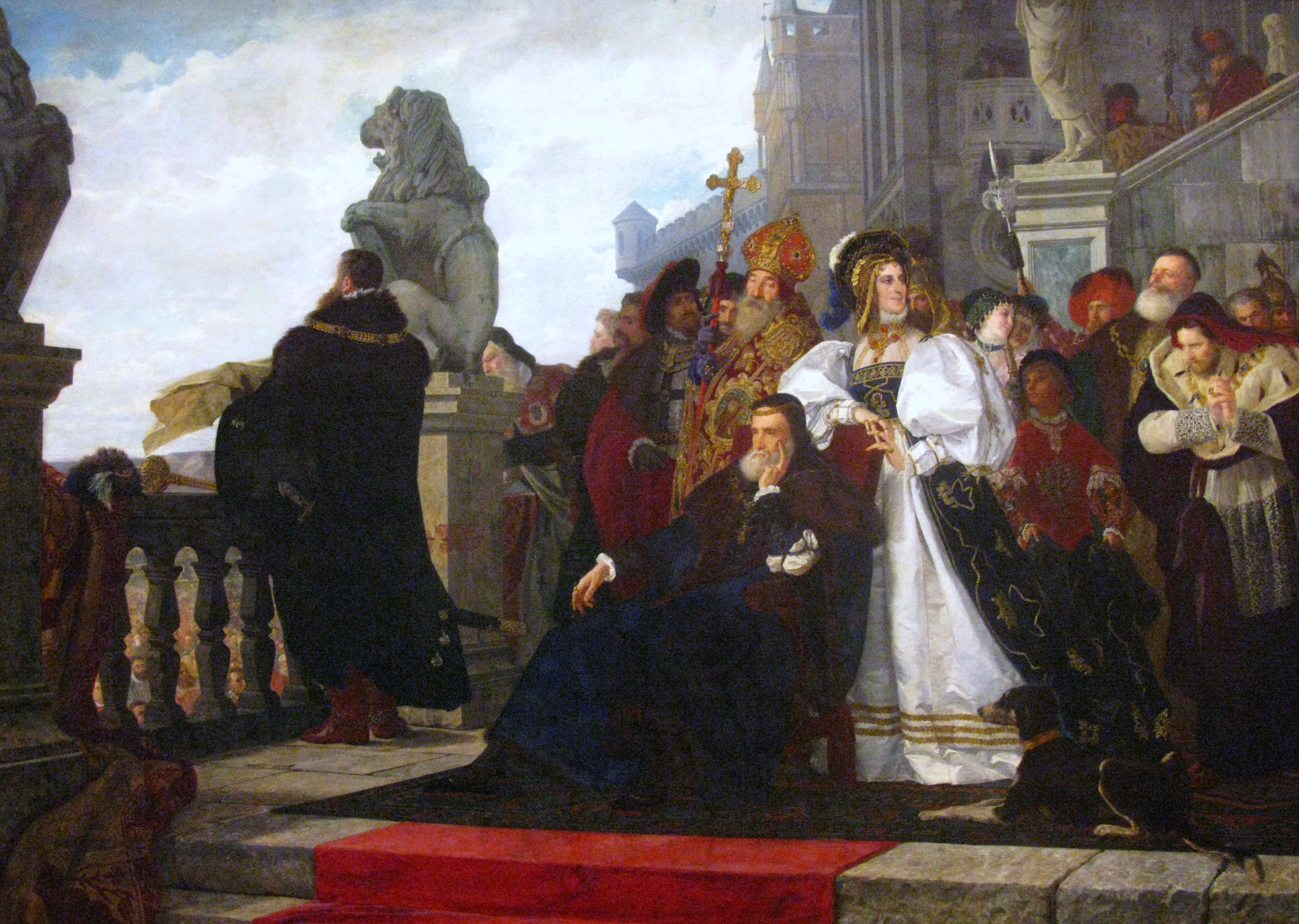
Sigismund I before the nobility in the Low Castle. Painting by Henryk Rodakowski. Warsaw National Museum

Lviv and its surroundings suffered especially during the so-called "chicken war" (wojna kokosza) or "hen war". In the spring of 1537, Polish King Sigismund I called on the nobility to join the militia and march on Moldavian hospodar Peter IV Rareș. By summer, about 150 thousand people gathered around Lviv, the main military camps stood near the Church of St. George, na Bajkach, Zboishcha, and Znesinnia. However, instead of participating in the war, the nobility rebelled, declaring rokosz (therefore, the "chicken war" is also known in history as the "Lviv rokosz"). The opposition to the king was led by Crown Great Marshal Piotr Kmita, whom Sigismund I personally came to pacify in mid-July, staying in the Low Castle of Lviv.

The king rejected all the nobility's demands, after which the rokosz turned into a series of rallies and negotiations with mutual accusations and threats. In September 1537, Sigismund I reconciled and dismissed the nobility home without starting the war. During this confrontation, detachments of nobility and their servants greatly "managed" in the suburbs of Lviv, exterminating all chickens within a radius of several kilometers around the city (it is for this reason that Polish magnates and Lviv burghers mockingly called the war "chicken"). The numerous army robbed villages, outlying estates, shops, warehouses, and merchant caravans heading to Lviv.

In 1590, the nightmare of Lviv and the suburbs at night became brothers Wojciech and Mikołaj Białoskórski, the elder sons of the burgrave of the High Castle Jan Białoskórski. At night they robbed passers-by, and during the day hid in the castle, where they kept the loot. All complaints from Lviv residents to the burgrave and royal starosta remained unanswered. Then Lviv rajcy Paweł Jeleonek and Stanisław Hęsorek took the complaint to the regional assembly of the nobility of the Ruthenian Voivodeship – the sejmik in Sudova Vyshnia. At the sejm, the brothers denied everything, and after it, they ambushed and tried to kill the rajcy. This outrageous case forced the king to order the starosta to investigate the conflict. The court sentenced the Białoskórskis to death in absentia, the old burgrave died of shame, and soon news came of the brothers' death in a drunken fight.

However, very often nobles who committed crimes against burghers remained unpunished. Even in cases where the offender was imprisoned in the cellars of the city town hall, he bombarded all possible instances with complaints about "violation of his noble rights". On the other hand, conflicts between nobles often escalated into "private wars" involving large numbers of armed servants, friends, and even soldiers. Often, Lviv Armenians or Jews from the Krakow suburb resisted noble arbitrariness (they were more organized and bolder than their coreligionists from Lviv's Jewish quarter).

=== Counterfeiting and forgery of goods ===
A common type of crime in medieval Lviv was the production of counterfeit coins. Since counterfeiting coins was considered a state crime, it was punished very severely – the guilty was burned at the stake, and for intentional circulation of counterfeit money, the hand was cut off. The mass appearance of counterfeit coins in Lviv is known from the beginning of the 15th century. In 1421, a royal decree was issued, according to which a special commission was created in Lviv from nobles and rajcy, which thoroughly checked the currency circulating in the city. During the inspection of all houses and trading points, commission members detected many counterfeit coins. Some of them were melted down, and the silver obtained was returned to the owners, while in counterfeits made of lead and copper, holes were simply made so that such coins could not be put back into circulation.

The appearance of counterfeit money in the city was publicly announced on Rynok Square, and a detailed description of the main signs of counterfeits was hung on the doors of the town hall. The authorities closely monitored monetary circulation and thoroughly investigated all cases where there was even a suspicion of law violation (especially when certain persons began to buy or melt old silver coins). In 1521, a local Armenian was burned in Lviv for making counterfeit coins, in 1579 –jeweler Leonard Matiasz and his accomplice Jacko Rusin, in 1602– another jeweler. In 1523, Jan Gnat, suspected of counterfeiting, managed to justify himself in court and prove the falsity of the accusations against him.

Jewelry was also counterfeited in Lviv by adding more ligature to the precious metal than required by technology. Another way of deception was imprinting a fake stamp of the Lviv guild of goldsmiths on low-grade items, which guaranteed high quality of jewelry. The prevalence of jewelry counterfeiting cases is indicated by the fact that in 1599, the Lviv goldsmiths' guild, to strengthen control over product quality, established a special guild mark in the form of a lion cub (a nationwide system of supervision over the content of precious metals in jewelry was introduced in the Commonwealth only in 1678).

Counterfeiting wine and other alcoholic beverages brought large incomes. Cheap young wines were turned into semblances of old noble varieties through clever manipulations and then sold at higher prices. The main methods were coloring to the desired color and giving the desired taste through blending and additives. Dyes used included fading fabrics, straw, and bark; to reduce the unpleasant taste of wine stone, sulfur, lime, gypsum, salted lard, and raw eggs were thrown into barrels; to give a piquant taste, pigeon droppings were added to wine. In addition, wax and expensive oriental fabrics were counterfeited in Lviv. To increase volume during melting, ground peas were added to wax, and since wax was expensive and an important export item for the magistrate, counterfeiting it was punished by burning at the stake (archival documents describe this type of execution for this crime in 1558).

=== Espionage ===
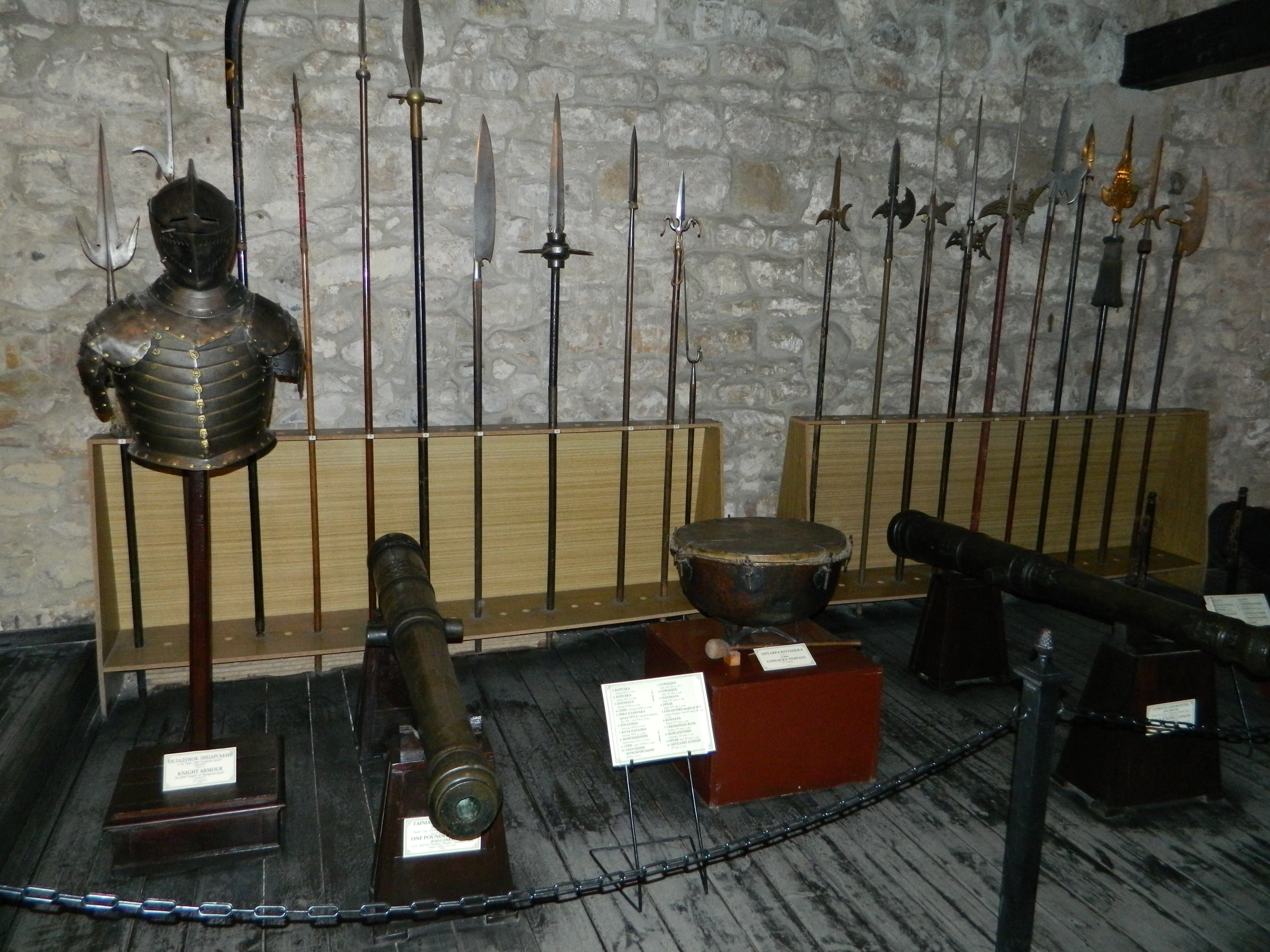
Medieval weapons. City Arsenal

In conditions of medieval state isolation and absence of permanent diplomatic relations, scouts collected not only secret military and political information but also general data about countries, their geography, population, and economy. Sent spies reported to their masters on the number and armament of troops, the state of the treasury and trade ties, as well as all court intrigues and gossip. The first professional scouts and counterintelligence officers were merchants and translators.

The department of translators created at the Lviv magistrate is first mentioned in documents from 1441. The department employed 12 people, mainly Armenians and Greeks. The level of Lviv translators was so high that at the beginning of the 16th century, the royal chancellery sent part of the diplomatic correspondence for processing from Kraków to Lviv. In addition, some Lviv translators worked permanently in the capital. Armenian merchants and translators who knew Eastern languages often performed diplomatic assignments, especially in the territory of the Ottoman Empire and Principality of Moldavia.

In 1469, two merchants were sent from Lviv to the court of hospodar Stephen the Great under the guise of concluding a free trade agreement, who were to find out if the Turks were planning a war against Poland. In Lviv, King Casimir IV himself awaited the return of the merchants, which testifies to the importance and secrecy of the mission.

In turn, city authorities ensured that foreign merchants arriving in Lviv did not pry into state and commercial secrets. Every arrival was questioned at the translators' department about the purpose of the visit. In addition, Lviv officially prohibited foreigners from establishing trading factories in the city and maintaining permanent trade representations. However, foreign merchants still penetrated Lviv, usually under the patronage of high-ranking officials from the capital. For example, the Lviv factory of Constantinople merchant Mordechai Kogan, who received from the sultan monopoly rights to export Malvasia to Poland, was lobbied by Crown Great Chancellor Jan Zamoyski (later, with the help of influential Lviv merchant Konstanty Korniakt, this factory was still closed).

== Justice ==
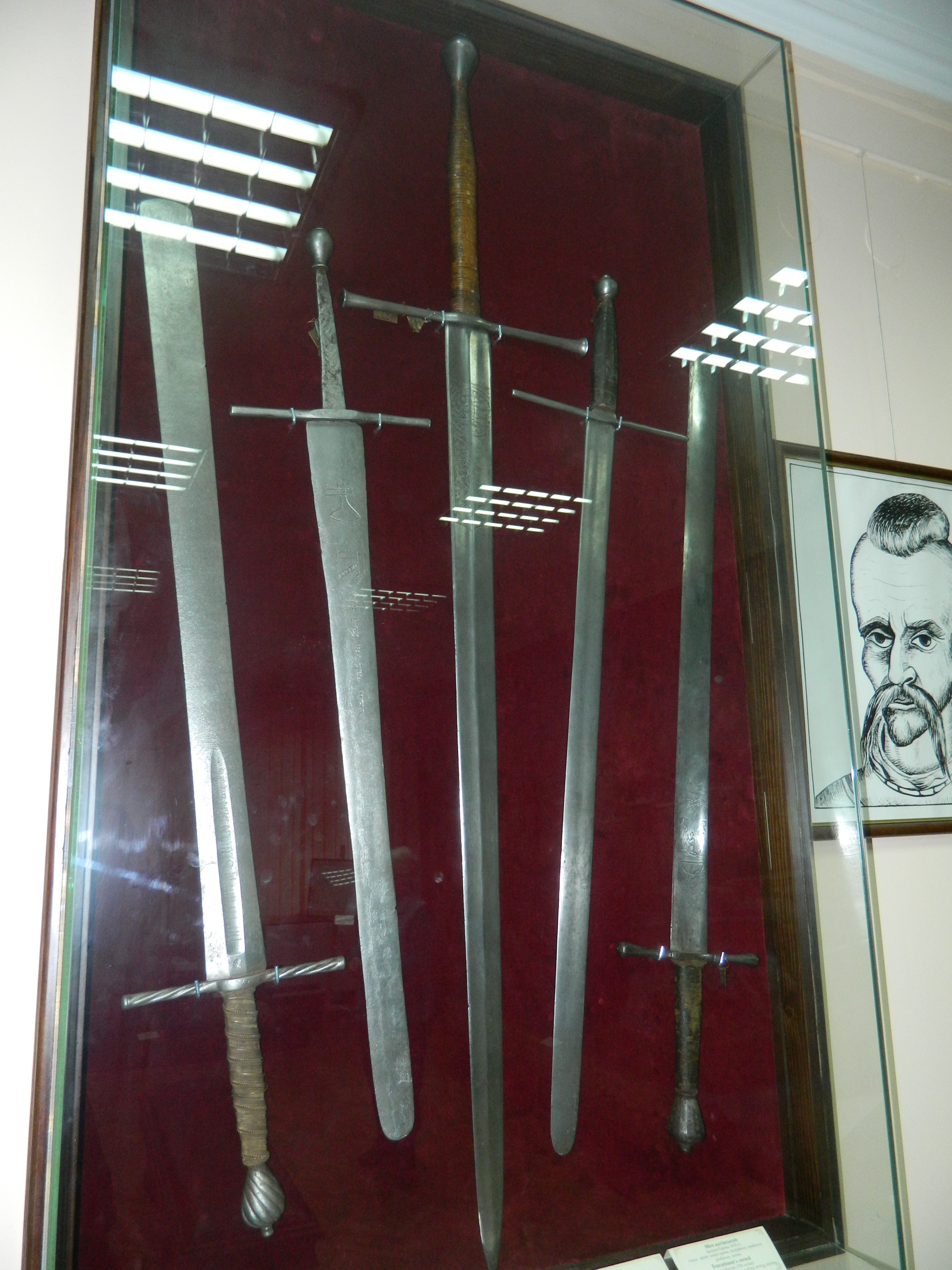
Executioner's swords (right and left of the center). Lviv Historical Museum

Justice in medieval Lviv consisted of judicial bodies and advocacy, as well as law enforcement agencies maintaining order, city and royal prisons where detainees were held, and execution bodies that carried out court sentences. Catholics absolutely dominated in the judicial and executive authorities, but Lviv Armenians and Jews within their self-government had partially autonomous judicial bodies that dealt with cases within ethnic communities.

The institution of lawyers appeared in Lviv with the introduction of Polish law norms and operated based on the Wiślica Statute. The Sejm constitution of 1538 prohibited clergy from performing defense functions, the 1543 constitution for the first time officially allowed payment for advocacy. Defenders who received money for providing legal assistance were called "procurators". According to Magdeburg Law norms, lawyers were prohibited from refusing a case they had accepted. Lawyers could not be Jews, priests, women, mentally ill, persons under 14 years old, as well as judges and lavniks who participated in the case consideration.

Interrogations and tortures were common in pre-trial investigations. During interrogations, two types of torture were applied to suspects – stretching on a special device and searing with hot iron. They stretched on a bench, ladder, and in the air until bones were dislocated from joints, in some cases to intensify pain, the victim was placed on special iron rakes (na jeżyka). To psychologically break the suspect, before starting torture, they showed him for a long time how everything would happen or took him to cells where others were already being tortured.

=== Judicial authority ===
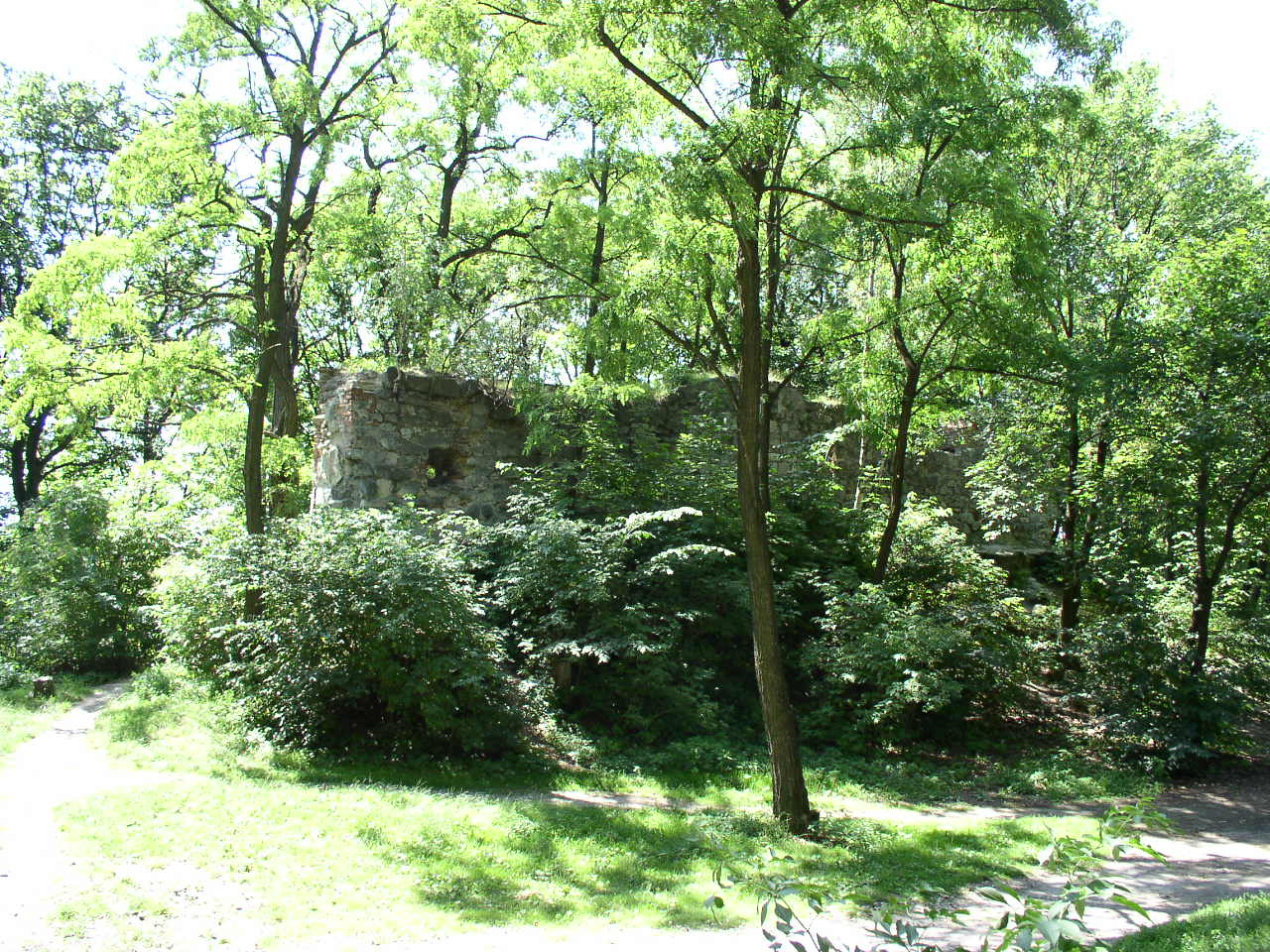
Ruins of the High Castle

In princely times, there were no special law enforcement agencies in Lviv, all judicial power was in the hands of the Galician-Volhynian prince. In the prince's absence, judicial functions on his behalf were performed by druzhina members or tiuns. The Lviv voivode was subordinate to the garrison of the princely druzhina and a small people's militia, assembled only during wars. Everyone collected evidence of a crime and presented charges independently.

After Lviv received Magdeburg Law (1356), judicial authority began to form in the city. Lviv was governed by rajcy –members of the council elected by burghers, as well as the wójt– elected head of the city court (initially this position was hereditary), and lavniks – members of the elected judicial collegium. The wójt, rajcy, and lavniks were responsible to the citizens for compliance with legislation and trade rules, monitored obtaining citizenship and inheritance of property, prices, and street order. The Armenian community of Lviv for some time had its own wójt (according to the royal decree of 1462, the Armenian wójt became completely independent from the city court, but at the end of the 15th century, the Armenian wójtship was liquidated).

During the rule of Władysław Opolczyk (1372–1378), the highest appellate court was formed in Lviv, in which under the starosta's leadership sat the provincial judge, Lviv voivode, Catholic and Orthodox bishops, Armenian wójt, four nobles, and three burghers. The Galician viceroy kept two-thirds of the income from executing criminal punishments (confiscation of property from those sentenced to death and fines for murder), and gave the remaining third to the city.

In the privilege of 1356, Casimir III noted that the wójt is subordinate only to the king or starosta. However, in 1387, Władysław Opolczyk's privilege made the positions of wójt and lavniks elective. In 1388, Władysław II Jagiełło confirmed this privilege, specifying that rajcy can elect the Lviv wójt, whose candidacy the king will approve (in July 1541, while in Vilno, King Sigismund I confirmed this decision again). In 1591, the Lviv city council decided to elect the wójt for a year alternately from among lavniks and council elders. A wójt could not be a mentally ill, mute, blind, deaf person, under 21 years old, born out of wedlock, non-Christian, or woman. The wójt began duties after taking the oath, the symbol of his power was a silver staff.

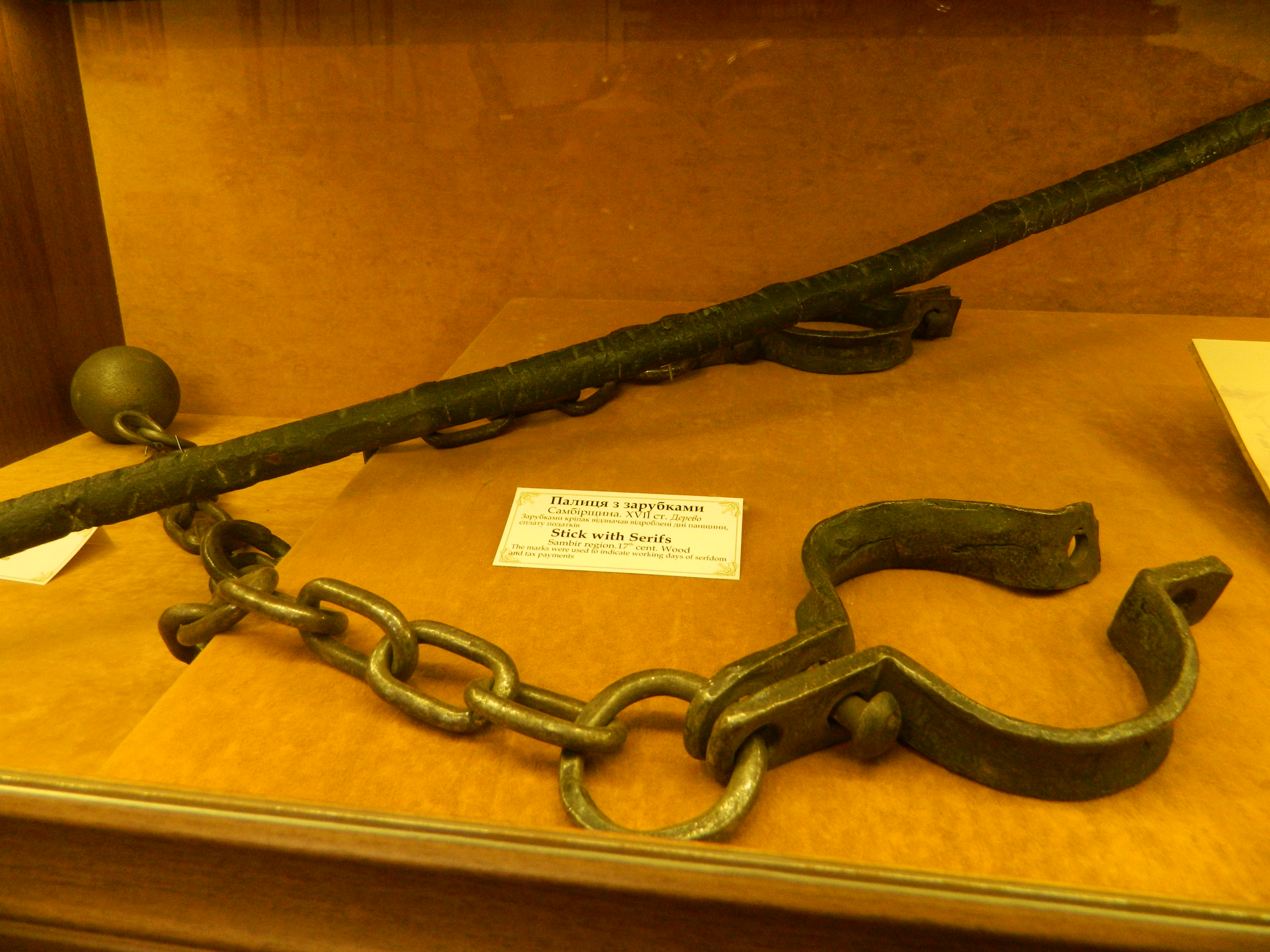
Shackles. Lviv Historical Museum

The city wójt participated in judicial investigations, was present at interrogations, tortures, and executions, considered criminal cases based on legal acts, appointed defenders for women, children, and disabled citizens (deaf, blind, and mute), as well as "witches" and "sorcerers", provided the accused with the opportunity to present evidence of innocence, fined for non-appearance in court or failure to maintain calm in the courtroom, prosecuted gamblers, and supervised the execution of sentences.

From the mid-14th century, the head of city self-government was the burgomaster (or proconsul). Burgomasters, like rajcy, performed administrative-judicial functions: resolved civil conflicts (especially those concerning commercial disputes, debts, guardianship, and inheritance), monitored prices and fire safety, punished guilty traders and artisans, collected some types of taxes. In addition to the regular one, there was a "night burgomaster" (also "night elder"), who supervised the city guard and checked if the Halych and Krakow gates were closed at night. His duties also included maintaining order during executions and floggings when crowds of citizens gathered in the square.

In 1434, as a result of the spread of the Polish legal system to western Ukrainian lands, the position of Ruthenian voivode was approved, appointed by the king, who led the Ruthenian Voivodeship and performed some judicial functions. In particular, the voivode controlled prices, scales, and measures in the city, oversaw compliance with Jewish rights, headed the veche court, which existed until 1578. Sometimes the voivode acted as a mediator in conflicts and disputes between burghers and the magistrate, nobility and clergy.

In July 1444, King Władysław III of Varna issued a privilege according to which Lviv received the right to catch criminals and murderers, escort them to the city, where to judge and punish them. Besides Kraków, no Polish city had such powers (however, Lviv's right extended only to the lands of the Ruthenian Voivodeship, while Kraków's – to the entire country). In the same 1444, the king established the dependence of all foreign merchants arriving in Lviv on city authority. The Lviv starosta recognized this jurisdiction of the city court only in 1460, which indicates that the existing Polish legal system was not distinguished by clear obligatoriness.

The competence of spiritual courts included cases of blasphemy and heresy. The Sejm constitution of 1543 established a procedure according to which cases related to witchcraft and witches were also considered exclusively by spiritual courts. (Note: An exception was cases where witchcraft served as a tool of crime and caused harm. Such cases were under the competence of the city court.) Church legislation was based on decisions of ecumenical and local councils. Lviv Dominicans, unlike Kraków ones, did not have an inquisitorial tribunal, did not conduct heresy trials, and did not burn heretics. The supremacy of nobility and patricians, as well as Magdeburg Law, limited the power of church-monastic justice. The Dominicans were only in charge of book censorship and their destruction.

Dungeons with fragments from the 14th – 16th centuries

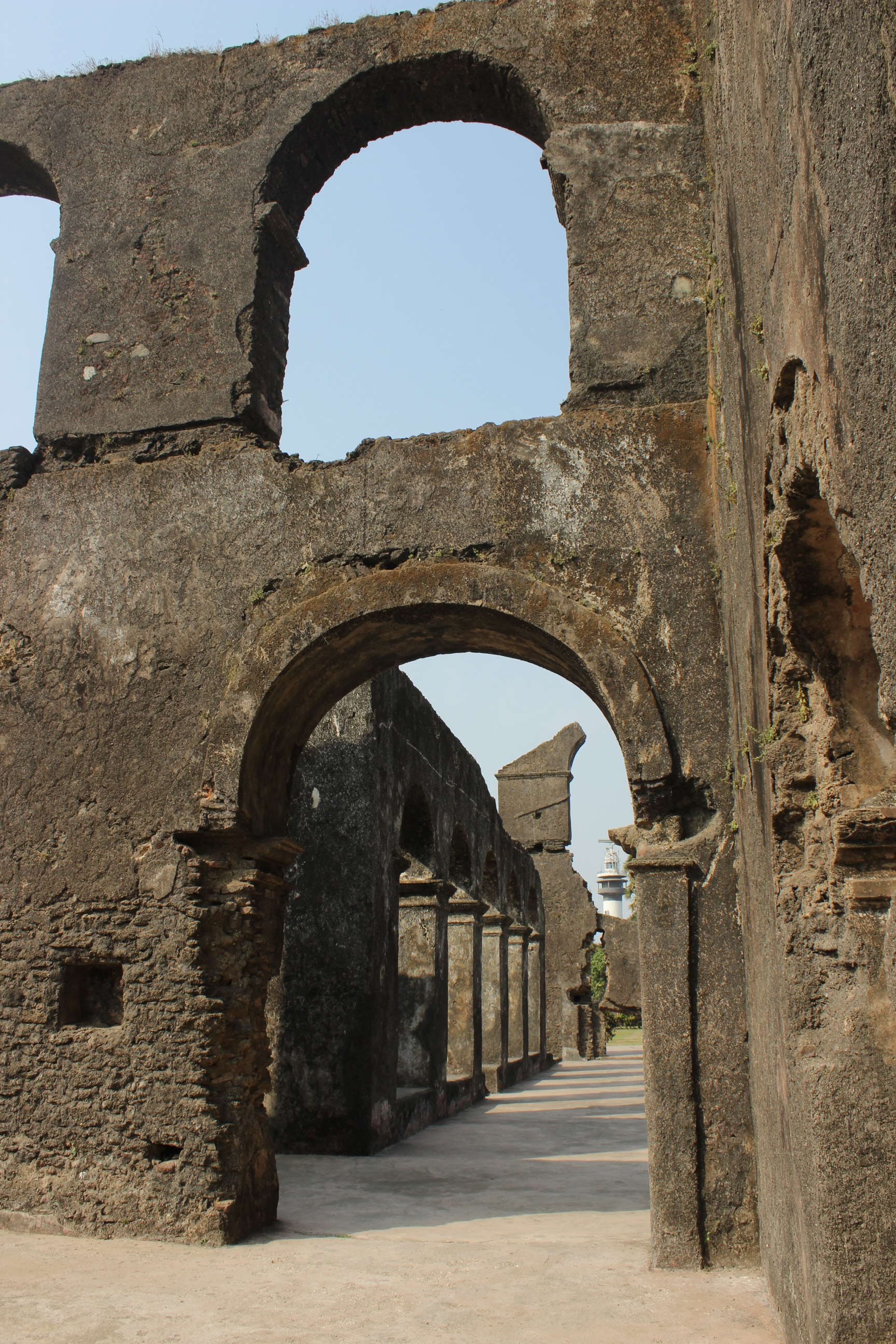
Dominican Monastery

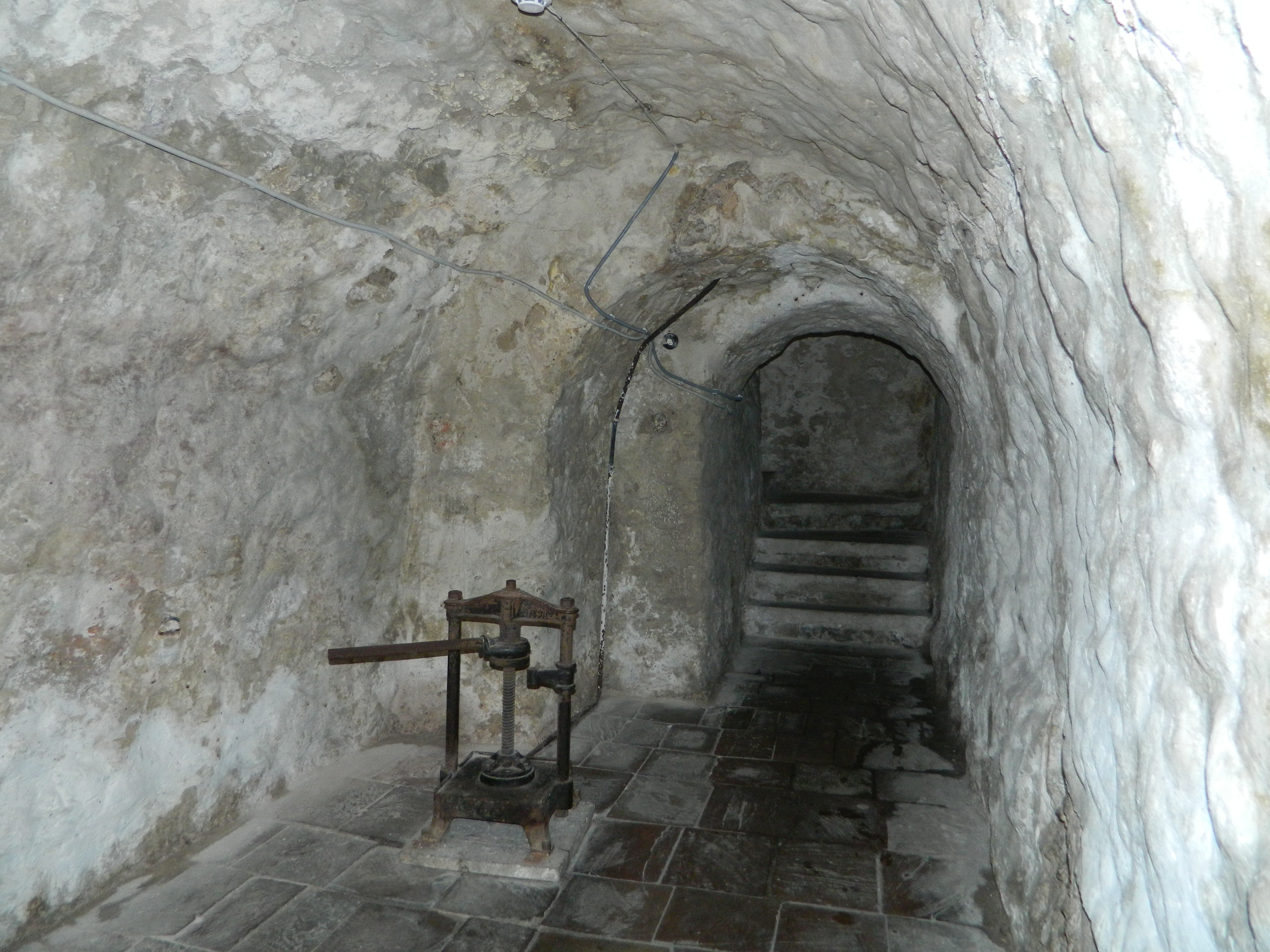
Pharmacy Museum

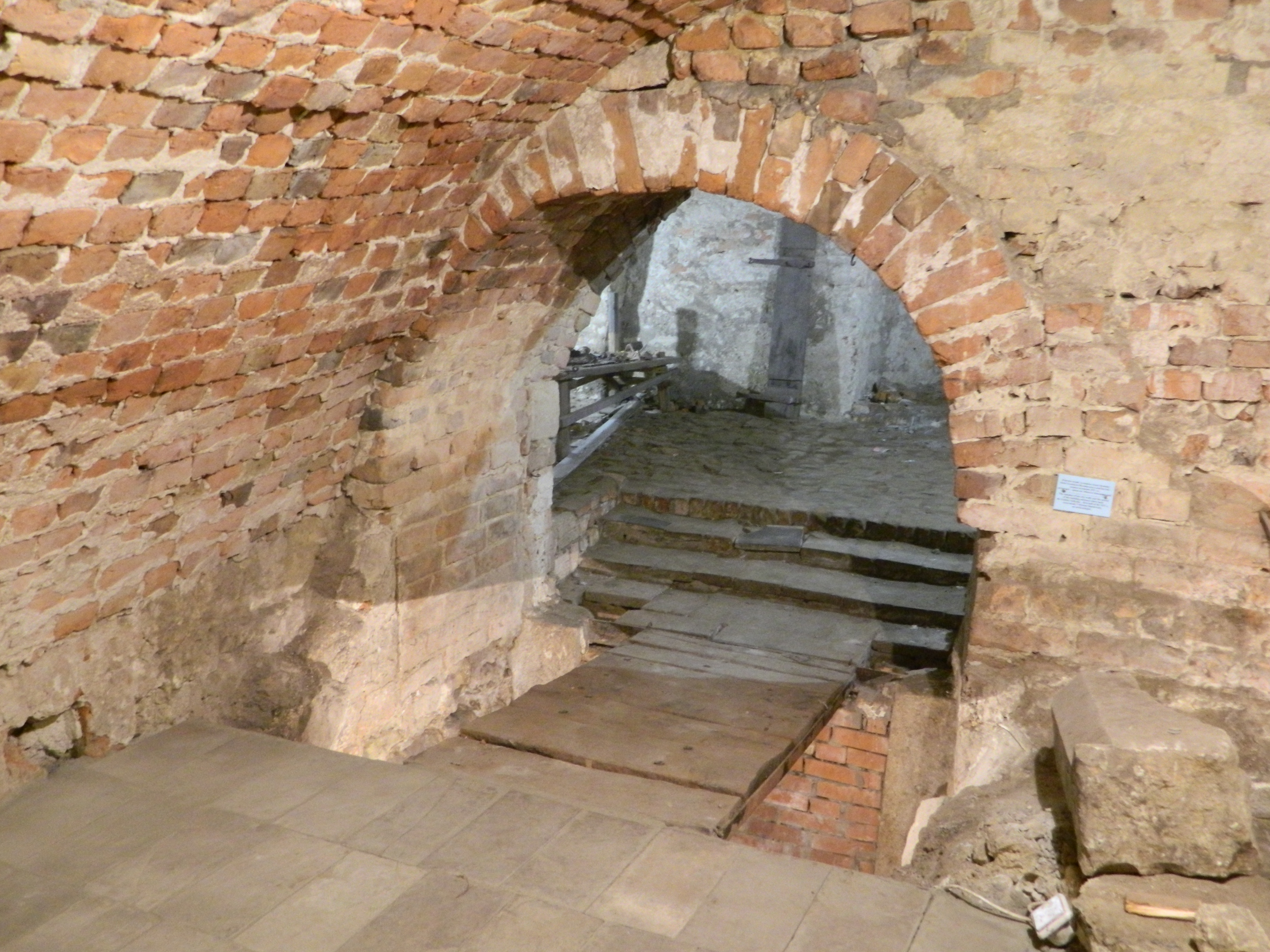
Jesuit Church

Thus, in medieval Lviv, there were three centers of judicial power: city (magistrate in the person of the burgomaster, rajcy, wójt, and lavniks), royal (in the person of the voivode, starosta, and castellan), and church (in the person of the Catholic archbishop, abbots of monasteries, cathedrals, and school rectors). The competence of the city court (wójt and lavniks court) included considering cases of burghers within the city walls of the midtown. Also in Lviv functioned grodzki court, ziemski court, and podkomorski court, which dealt mainly with criminal and civil cases of the nobility. In the structure of the city court, there were officials performing functions of investigators, inquirers, and court executors. The Lviv city court was an appellate instance for all city courts of the Ruthenian and Bełz Voivodeship.

The city court (lava) besides investigative functions also drew up wills and divided the property of the deceased. According to Magdeburg Law norms, the wójt could not pass sentence without coordination with lavniks, who were elected to their post for life. The court had its own chancellery and staff of scribes who filled judicial books (Inducta et protocolla officii civilis scabinalis). A scribe who made an incorrect entry could have his hand cut off, and for forging judicial books, burned at the stake. Lavniks' personal rights were practically the same as rajcy's. They received an annual share from the court's land property, as well as a share from court fees and fines.

City justice was carried out by several courts of different ranks. The great burgrave court (Burgrabialia seu magna), meeting three times a year, considered property and debt claims, cases of attacks on roads, cases against religion and the Church, approved sales and purchases of property, expelled criminals from the city. The hay court (Sąd gajony wyłożony or Iudicia exposita bannita), sitting twice a month, considered cases of property inheritance and debts, resolved property disputes, and approved gift records. The current court (Potrzebny sąd or Iudicia necessaria bannita), meeting three times a week consisting of the wójt and several jurors, mainly considered cases on wills. The guest court (Sąd gościnny or Opportuna vel hospitum bannita) consisting of at least three lavniks considered cases between burghers and foreigners. Almost every day sat the Hot court (Gorące prawo or Ardua criminalis seu manualis facti), which considered cases of persons caught at the crime scene. This court proceeded by abbreviated procedure: the criminal had no right to appeal and release on bail.

In the first half of the 16th century, the official code of laws of Poland became the "Saxon Mirror", from the second half of the 16th century, the code "Carolina" began to be widely applied in Polish courts.

=== Law enforcement agencies ===
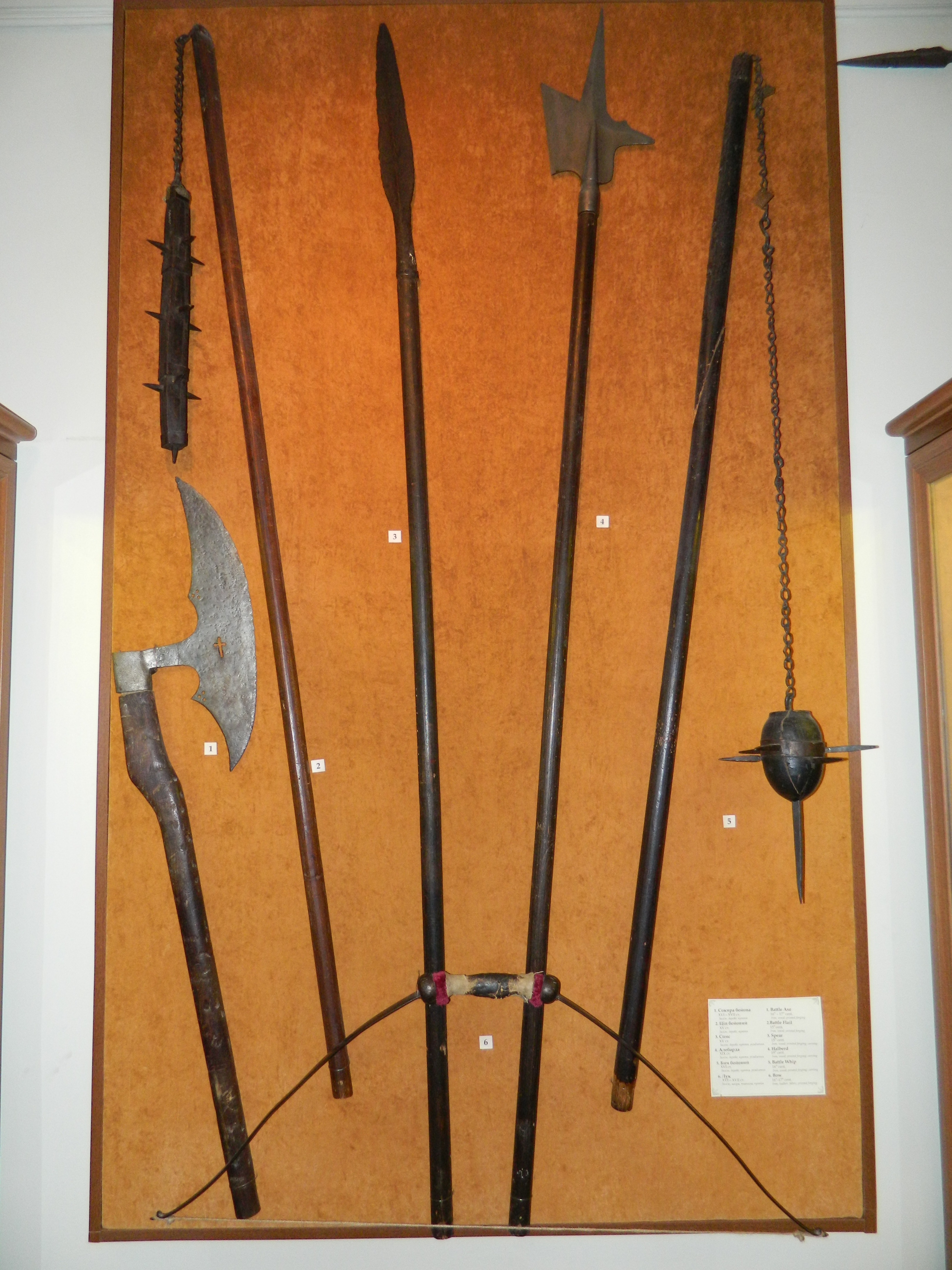
Battle flail (second from left). Lviv Historical Museum

In the 15th century, the first city police was created, armed with heavy battle flails (from which it got the name cepaki). Lviv guards were dressed in long blue caftans with red or green lapels and cuffs, edged with braided cords. Decurions wore red caftans with blue lapels, and over the caftans, cepaki wore cuirasses. On their heads, law enforcers wore fur bear hats with red patches, cords, and cockades with the city coat of arms. Due to limited funding, cepaki walked in rather worn uniforms; for sewing new clothes, the magistrate each time created special commissions.

Cepaki monitored order on streets and during mass events, were used as honor guards, sometimes accompanied officials to other cities. The striking weight of the battle flail was studded with iron spikes, for which it was called the "scourge of sinners". If necessary, cepaki received helmets, and from the end of the 16th century – bandoliers (short guns similar to elongated pistols). In addition, the guards had several saluting cannons used during celebrations. Deceased cepaki were buried by the magistrate at its expense, and their families received small monetary assistance from the city. Candidates for cepaki were recruited on the recommendation of city guard veterans, only after checking and oath were newcomers accepted into service.

While on duty, cepaki slept in the basement of the town hall, where they awaited alarm signals about theft or robbery. In winter, when cepaki ran out of firewood, they often simply went home, leaving the prisoners of the city prison and the city itself without protection. Sometimes the magistrate sent cepaki to suburban villages to force peasants to pay taxes or perform corvée, often cepaki participated in arrests in the suburb territory. Initially, in the 15th century, there were only four cepaki, in the 17th century – at least eight, and by the arrival of Austrians in Lviv at the end of the 18th century, there were 15 city guards. During enemy siege of Lviv or other threat to public order, with magistrate permission, the ranks of the city guard were supplemented by volunteers.

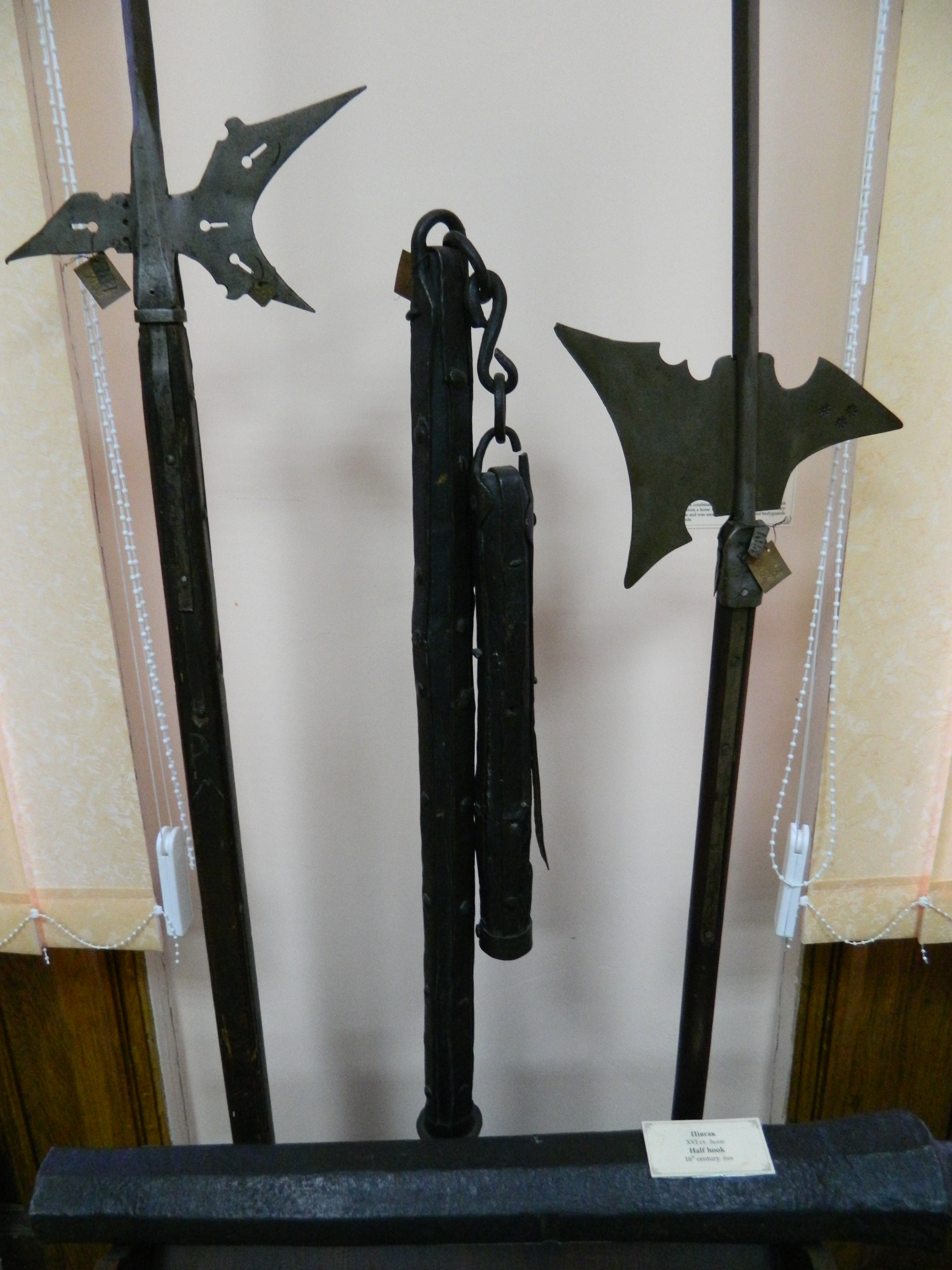
Variant of battle flail (in the middle). Lviv Historical Museum

The poor discipline of cepaki is evidenced by archival documents, which several times report fights arranged by guards in the Jewish quarter, or brawls between cepaki on one side and servants of the royal starosta from the Low Castle and Lviv garrison soldiers on the other. The burgomaster was also subordinate to two personal bodyguards (ceklarze), who not only added authority to the official but also carried out his secret and delicate assignments. Order on the outskirts of Lviv was monitored by landwójts or "night elders", assisted by elected "seniors". Every evening after closing the city gates, they patrolled their districts and assigned streets.

The magistrate had the institution of woźnys, who searched for and arrested criminals, ensured execution of court decisions, brought conflict parties to court, recorded victim statements, conducted searches in private homes, confiscated crime tools and other evidence, supervised prisoners. Also, woźny publicly announced royal decrees, city authority decisions, court decisions on suspect search, and criminal case verdicts in the most crowded places of the city. The woźny was elected by the wójt and lavniks, he was allowed to carry and use weapons (in fact, many investigative and search actions the woźny conducted together with the wójt and lavniks). In criminal cases, the woźny acted as a public prosecutor, his testimony equated to that of two witnesses (and this despite the fact that the city court did not accept testimonies of "people of the Ruthenian rite" at all). Due to frequent abuses of power (especially the right to use force), the city pospolstwo treated woźny mostly unfavorably or disdainfully.

From the 16th century, Lviv had a special trade police subordinate directly to the city translator. The competence of this unit included ensuring no one traded on holidays, as well as guarding the magistrate translator who was present at all deals involving foreign merchants.

=== Prison system ===
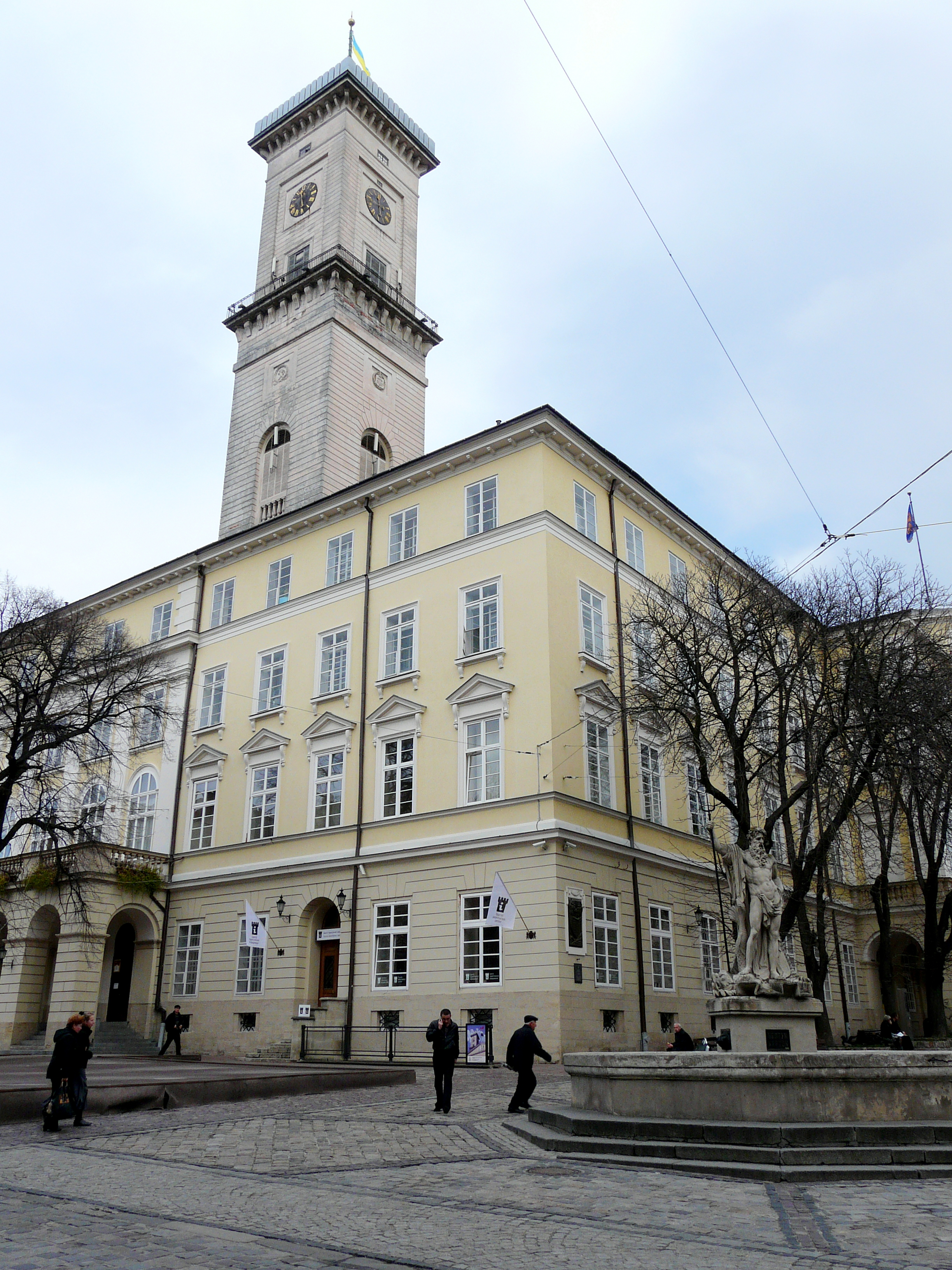
Modern view of the town hall

In medieval Lviv, imprisonment was not an independent type of punishment. People were imprisoned in the city prison during investigation, as well as for minor offenses, for example, at the guild's request for violating the charter, for suburban villagers' refusal to perform duties imposed by the magistrate, or for non-payment of debts. The main prison was located in the dungeons of the town hall; the "Shala" prison was on the first floor of the town hall and sometimes used for court sessions; the "Behind Bars" prison ("Za kratą") was located above the entrance to the magistrate house; the "Above the Treasure" cell ("Nad skarbem") was next to the wójt's office.

In various periods, defensive towers of the city wall or rented rooms in private houses (for particularly important persons) were used as prisons. For example, cells existed in the Halych Gate tower and the tower over the Bosacka wicket, and Ivan Pidkova was held in Mateusz Korynniak's house before execution. Prisoners under the royal starosta's jurisdiction were held in cells of the High and Low Castles. In the High Castle, prisoners were kept in the five-story Noble (Szlachecka) and four-story Lazy (Hultajska) towers, in the castle house cells, and in collars in the castle courtyard. Prisoners and their food were lowered by rope to the basement floors of the towers. In the Low Castle, which simultaneously served as the royal starosta's residence and meeting place for the starosta court, nobility was held in the corner "Rynza" tower, and prisoners from the common people – in the house near the gate tower. In the 16th century, some arrested were held in the starosta's house basements (Lviv residents jokingly called these cells "tavern").

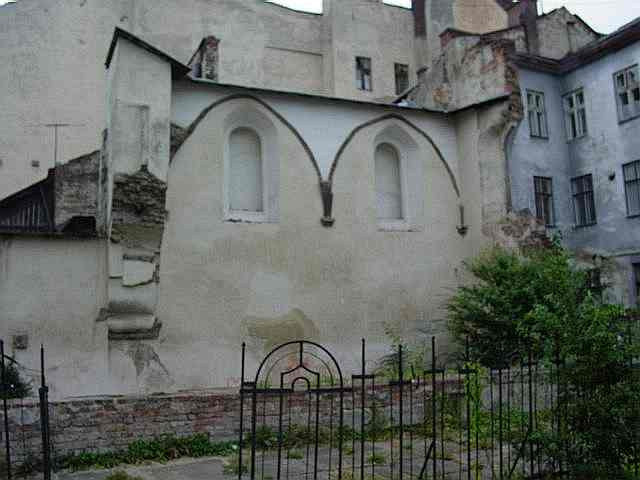
Site where the "Golden Rose" synagogue was located

Besides the magistrate and starosta prisons, Lviv had separate prisons for the largest national communities – Ruthenian, Armenian, and Jewish. For minor offenses, mainly of property or disciplinary nature, Ruthenians were briefly imprisoned in the prison near the St. George Monastery or in cells on the top floor of the Korniakt Tower (the first served as a place of imprisonment by decision of the Lviv Orthodox bishop, the latter was often used by the Lviv Dormition Brotherhood). The Jewish prison was at the Golden Rose synagogue (here was also a place where offenders were chained by the neck).

Lviv city and starosta prisons were characterized by poor sanitation and ventilation, they were rarely cleaned and repaired, cells were dark, damp, and foul-smelling. The magistrate did not allocate money for prisoner food, so relatives fed them (sometimes – compassionate guards). Parcels were not checked, and sometimes even alcohol got into cells. Drunken prisoners who decided to riot or sing songs were forcibly subdued by overseers from among cepaki. Prisoners in the High Castle ate from one kitchen with guards, beer was even brewed there for important persons. If the burgrave's servants (draby), guarding High Castle prisoners, deliberately released a prisoner, they had to serve the fugitive's punishment.

In 1408–1411, in a High Castle cell sat King Władysław II's personal prisoner Jakub of Kobylany, accused of adultery with the queen. In 1410–1412, German crusaders captured in the Battle of Grunwald were held here awaiting ransom, in 1559 – Princess Halszka Ostrogska. In June 1423, the entire Lviv city council was imprisoned in the Low Castle prison for refusing to pay one of the royal taxes.

=== Criminal punishment ===
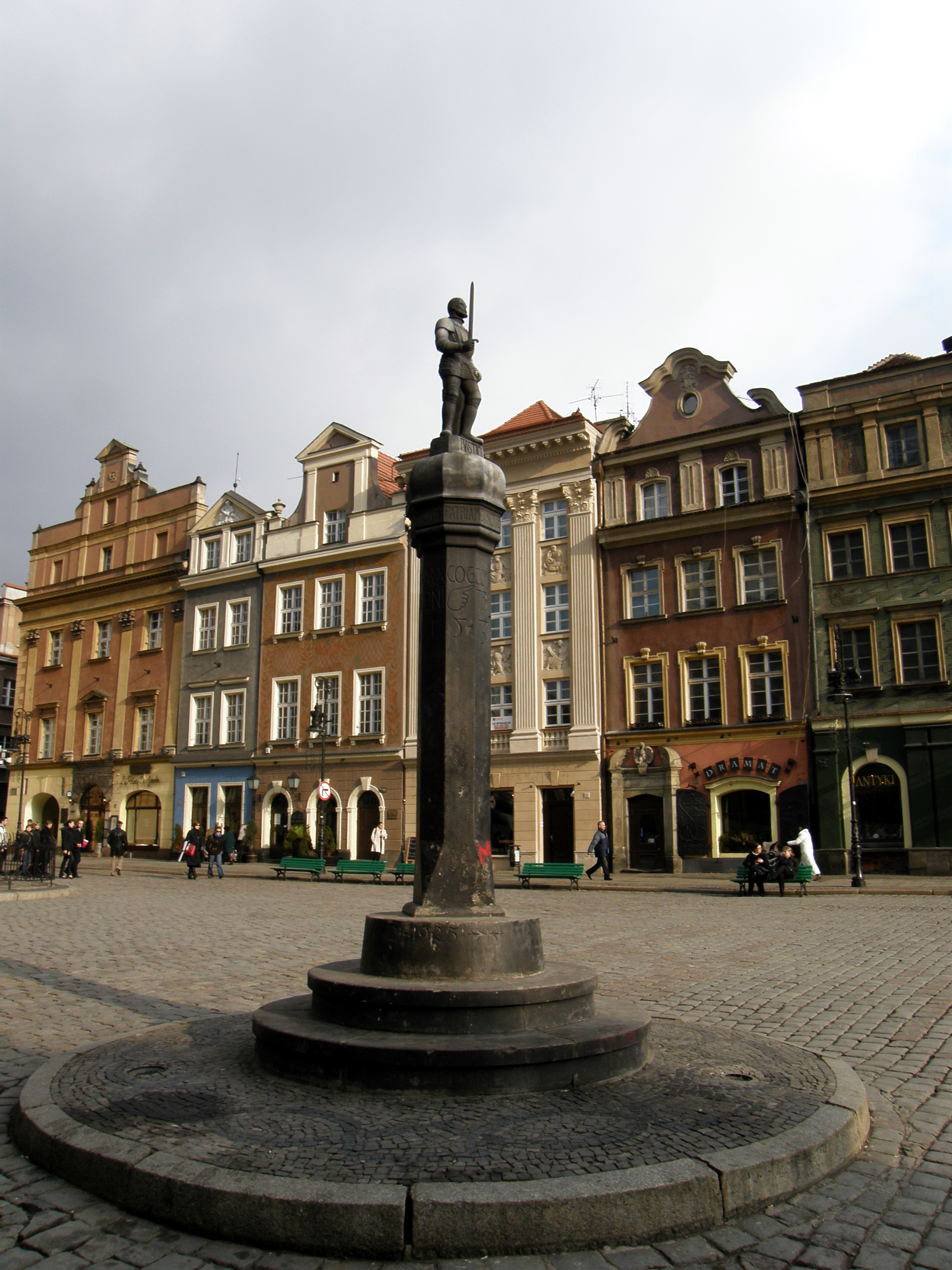
Typical medieval pillory (Poznań)

For the princely era, mild punishments were characteristic, usually in the form of fines. The death penalty was rather an exception.

In the Polish period, death penalties or corporal punishments were executed by the city executioner (kat or pan malodobry), (Note: Other epithets were "executor", "master" or "master of justice".) who received additional payment from the magistrate for each execution. There were no fixed rates. For example, in 1531, for beheading, the executioner received 12 groszes, and in 1548 – already 7.5 groszes. In addition, the city authority separately paid for swords, hanging ropes, shackles, firewood for burning, and construction of gallows, as well as services of guards present at the execution, night burgomaster, voivode or his deputy, gravediggers, and clergy. Sometimes the cost of execution was deducted from the executed's property. Although the executioner was under the legal protection of the king and magistrate, he and his family members could not participate in the city's public life. Guild charters prohibited concluding contracts with the executioner, even in the temple a special place was allocated for him.

It was considered shameful to help the executioner perform his professional duties. Lviv guilds, which the magistrate obliged to escort those sentenced to death to the block, constantly tried to get rid of this duty. The first information about Lviv executioners dates back to the beginning of the 15th century. Most often, vagrants, beggars, and other citizens of low social status became them. Another category of persons whom the authority forced to become executioners were criminals themselves sentenced to death. "Death row inmates" were faced with a choice: either be executed by a visiting executioner or execute death sentences themselves.

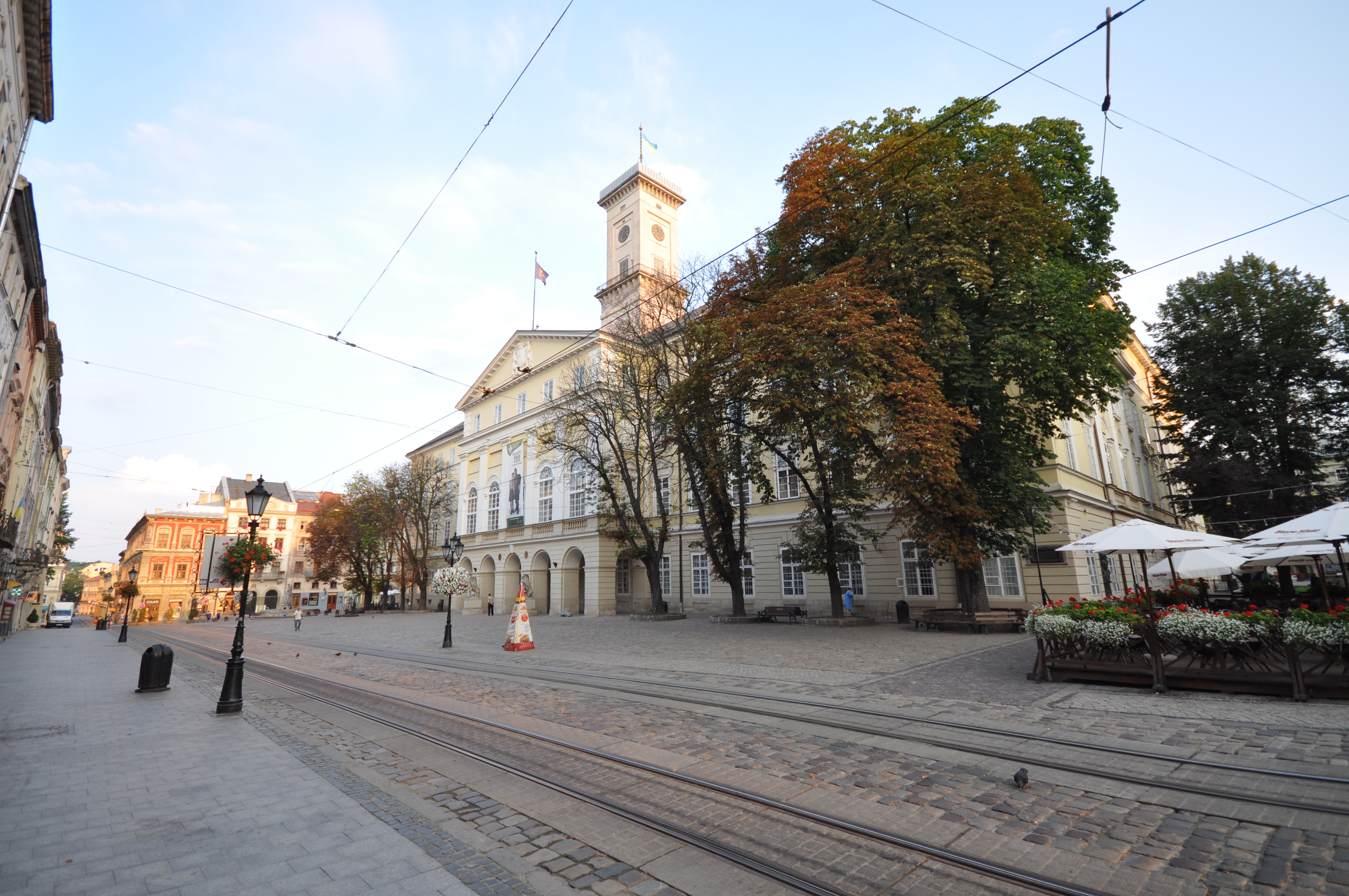
Rynok Square

Besides executing death sentences and corporal punishments, the city executioner's duties included torturing suspects, supervising prisoners, escorting accused to court and sentenced to the place of execution, burying those who died in prison or during torture and had no relatives. Sometimes the executioner and his assistants for additional pay monitored order in city markets and streets, were involved in cleaning garbage, manure, and dead animals. Some executioners moonlighted as treating the sick or petty trade. The executioner was on the magistrate's staff and reported directly to the Lviv wójt. The city also paid for the services of two executioner's assistants, provided the executioner with a house and housing repairs (according to archival documents, families of Lviv executioners lived in the Jewish quarter or between the walls of the Halych Gates).

The death penalty was executed by beheading (most often), hanging, burning, breaking knees, quartering, and impaling. Sometimes to humiliate the executed's honor, his severed head was raised on a pole and left for public view. In special cases, parts of quartered criminals' bodies were hung on poles at the entrance to Lviv. Nobles and wealthy burghers were executed on the western side of Rynok Square, where executions took place at a wooden pillory (pranger), installed near the town hall in 1425. In 1598, a stone pillar was installed, topped with sculptures of an executioner with a sword in his hands and the goddess Themis with scales of justice (this pranger stood in the square until 1826, and is now stored in the Lviv Historical Museum). In 1594, on Rynok Square near the salt shop, a chain with a collar appeared "for quarrelsome women" (those guilty of violating public order were left in the collar for several hours, which had more of an educational purpose than causing physical pain).

Beheading was for various offenses: attempting to enter the city over the wall, banditry, murder (including a guard while performing official duties), and even bigamy. The executioner's sword (sword of justice) had a wide two-handed handle and a straight blade with the tip cut off almost at a right angle. The blade depicted the city coat of arms and gallows (several preserved swords are exhibited in the Lviv Historical Museum). In 1508, a case occurred when the executioner failed to behead a noble with one blow and immediately declared it a sign from above. The "death row inmate" was pardoned, but after treatment, he sued the city for violating his rights.

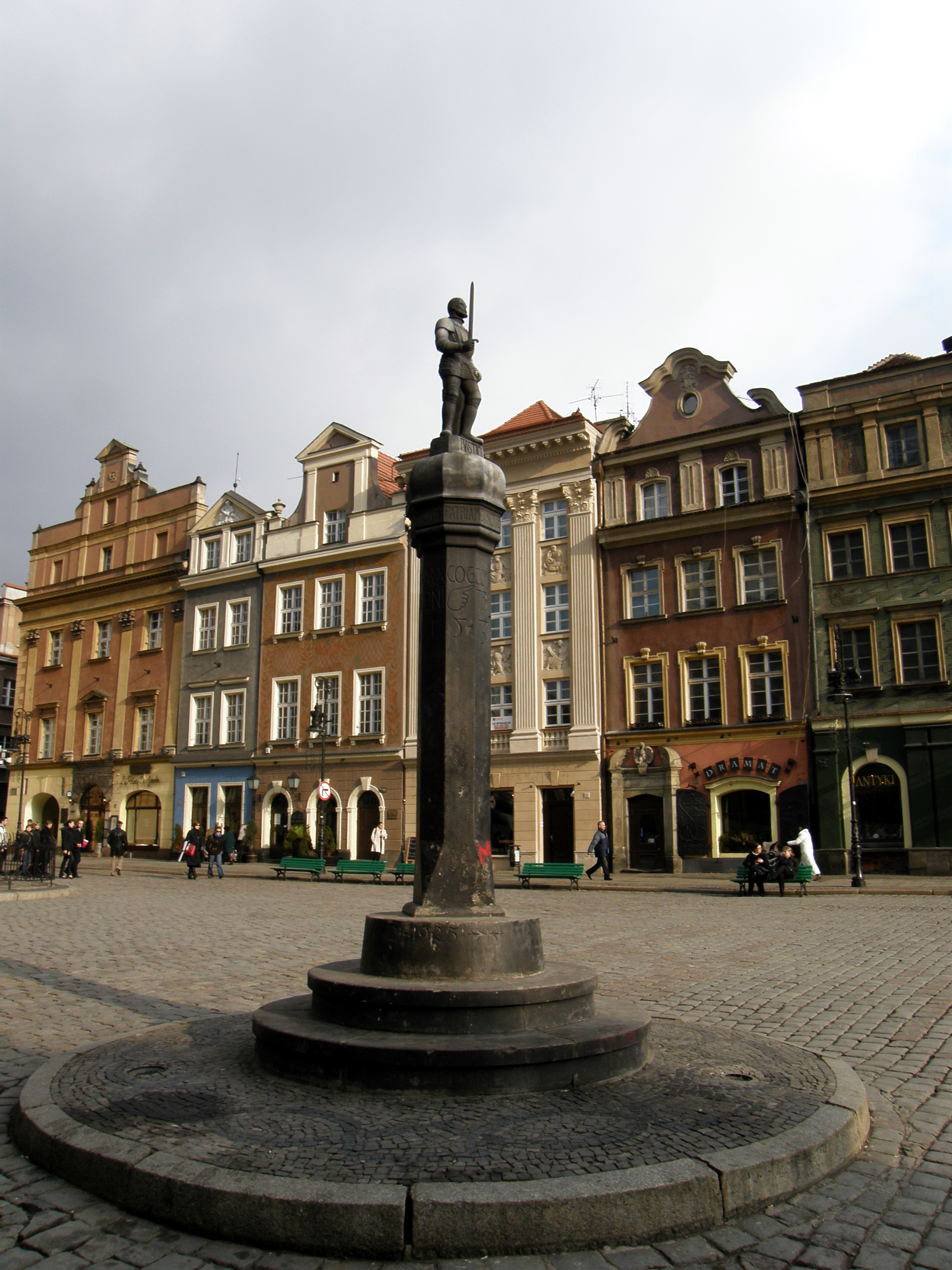
Monument to Ivan Pidkova in Lviv

On May 5, 1564, on Rynok Square, the deposed Moldavian hospodar Ștefan Tomșa was beheaded. He tried to secretly pass through Galicia to Hungary, but near the town of Stryi, he was detained by the local voivode and imprisoned in the Lviv town hall prison. Tomșa's body was buried in the Orthodox Monastery of St. Onuphrius. In June 1578, in Lviv on Rynok Square, Ivan Pidkova was executed – a pretender to the Moldavian throne who with hired Cossack detachments campaigned on Iași. Retreating into the Commonwealth, Pidkova was arrested and sentenced to death at the demand of Murad III. Pidkova was held in a rich private house, given a glass of wine before execution, and after beheading buried in the basement of the Dormition Church. The execution was observed by the arrived sultan's ambassador, while King Stephen Báthory, who was visiting the city at the time, left for hunting the day before the execution.

In September 1582, in Lviv, the deposed Moldavian hospodar Iancu Sasul was beheaded. Taking the treasury, he also tried to break through to Hungary but was detained by the starosta of Sniatyn and delivered to Lviv. At Sasul's request, the execution was carried out not with the executioner's sword but with his own battle sword, which was kept in the town hall until the end of the 17th century (the hospodar's body was buried in the Bernardine Monastery). According to a legend circulating in Lviv, Sasul's severed head was sewn to the body by his wife with her own hair. In 1583, in Lviv by court decision, several captured Cossacks were beheaded simultaneously.

Hanging was considered the most humiliating method of execution, most often sentenced to it were thieves, robbers, and bandits. Often, to "deter" potential offenders, hanged bodies were left hanging until the rope rotted or the corpse decomposed. A permanent stone gallows stood outside the city walls on the Hill of Executions (area of intersection of modern Kleparivska, Zolota, and Pstraka streets), but there were also temporary gallows. The underground part of the structure made of hewn stone resembled a well, into which the executioner threw the remains of the executed, and the upper part was stone pillars on which the sentenced were hung.

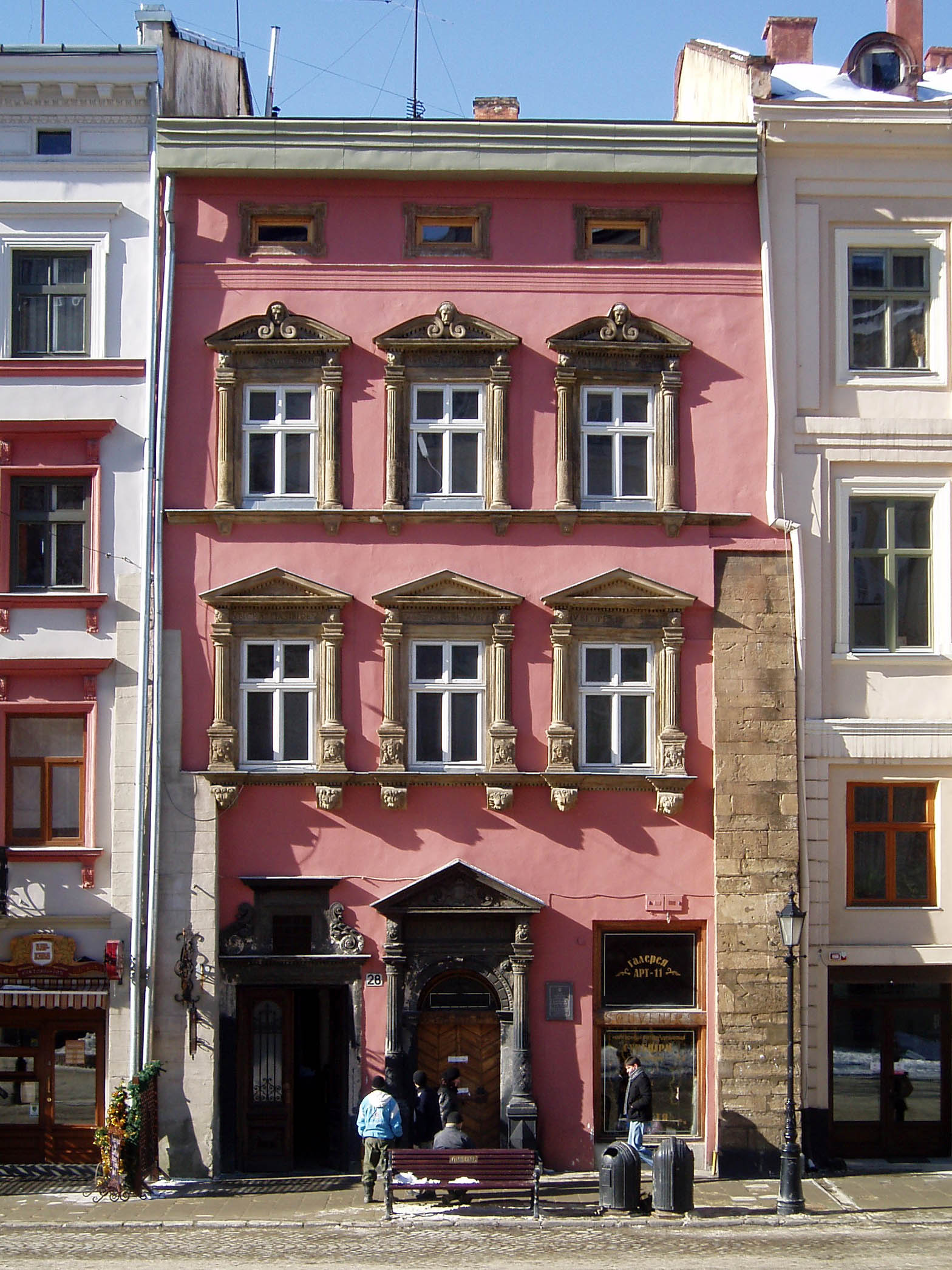
Hepner House

Burning executed heretics, blasphemers (including those who committed theft from a church), apostates, arsonists, counterfeiters and makers of fake wax with city stamp, women who committed theft, poisoned someone or killed a close relative, as well as for sexual contacts between representatives of different confessions (the only such case in 1518 was later challenged in the royal court).

Knees were broken for those who committed premeditated murder (especially family members), including murder with poison, robbed a temple or cemetery, committed night arson, caused serious bodily harm to the victim, or participated in incest. Quartering was also for serious crimes (including banditry), sometimes sentenced only to cutting off hands and head. Relatively rarely criminals were impaled, mainly women who killed their minor children were sentenced to this (in addition, for killing a newborn, a woman could be buried alive or drowned). Strictly, up to the death penalty, punished for incest, bigamy, and rape (the Church insisted on such sentences, monitoring citizens' morals).

Executions on Rynok Square and the Hill of Executions always took place with a large gathering of citizens and residents of suburban villages (often the crowd actively supported or cursed the sentenced). Besides death penalties (punishments "on life"), city executioners practiced cutting off organs, beating with batogs and whips, shackling in stocks (punishments "on body"). Hands were cut off for intentional wounding that made a person crippled, for false oath, and counterfeiting coins by reducing their weight; tongue cut off for lynching, and ears or nose – for pimping or petty theft.

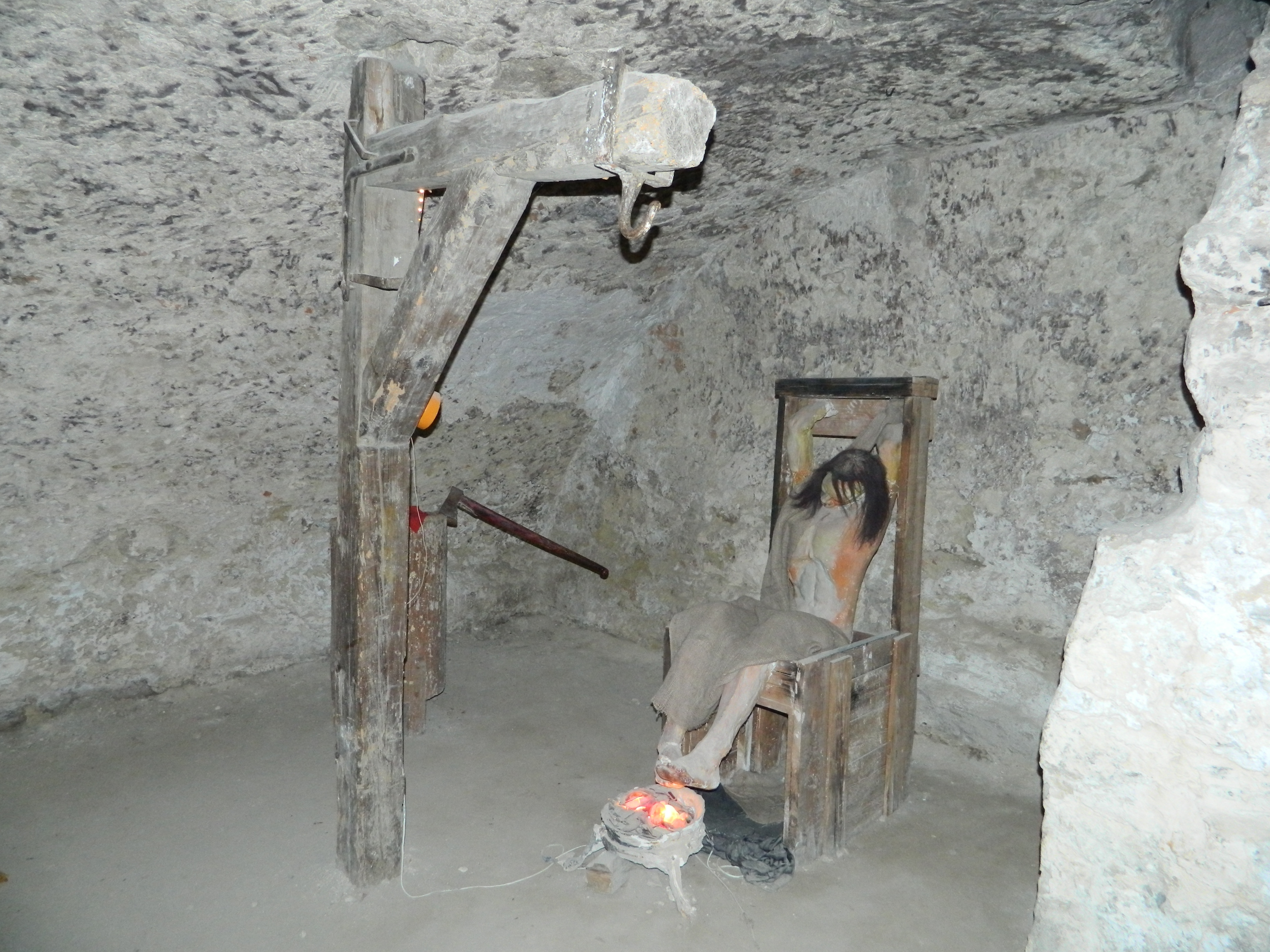
Reconstruction of gallows and heat torture in the basement of the Dominican Monastery

For prostitutes (kurwy), sentenced to corporal punishments, all civil rights were preserved. Those who kept a brothel (lupanar) or engaged in pimping were beaten with batogs at the pillory or on the town hall steps, and expelled from the city. Magdeburg Law allowed a husband to arrange lynching if he caught his wife with another man (in such circumstances, the guilty could be wounded or killed with impunity). Adultery on the man's side was limited to censure, he was punished only when he had two or more wives. For cruel beating of wife or children, punished with whips, fine, or imprisonment.

Very often on the steps before the town hall or Low Castle flogged for thefts, violence against servants, hooliganism, refusal to perform labor duties, or negligent performance of duties (for example, a woźny who acted biasedly, or a lawyer who deliberately harmed his client). The orczyk punishment was hanging the offender by arms twisted behind the back. Such execution was applied, for example, to bakers who made poor-quality bread. For crimes by negligence, punishment was mild. Exempted from criminal liability for thefts and robberies were minors (under 14 years), as well as those who committed petty theft due to hunger.

== Bibliography ==
- Bilostotskyi, S. (1999). Правові аспекти функціонування посади ката у Львові. Том II. Частина I [Legal Aspects of the Functioning of the Executioner's Position in Lviv. Volume II. Part I]. Ostrog: Ostrozka akademiia. Naukovi zapysky.
- Bilostotskyi, S. (1999). Посадові особи війтівсько-лавничого суду Львова та їх процесуальний статус у XVI-XVIII ст [Officials of the Lviv Magisterial Court and Their Procedural Status in the 16th-18th Centuries]. Lviv: Spetsialnyi vypusk Visnyka Lvivskoho universytetu.
- Zaiats, O. (2012). Громадяни Львова XIV-XVIII ст.: правовий статус, склад, походження [Citizens of Lviv in the 14th-18th Centuries: Legal Status, Composition, Origin]. Lviv: Instytut ukrainskoi arkheohrafii ta dzhereloznavstva im. M. S. Hrushevskoho NAN Ukrainy. p. 558. ISBN 978-966-02-6391-8.
- Isayevych, Ya.; Lytvyn, M.; Steblii, F. (2006). Історія Львова. Том 1 [History of Lviv. Volume 1]. Lviv: Tsentr Yevropy, Instytut ukrainoznavstva im. I. Krypiakevycha NAN Ukrainy. p. 296. ISBN 966-7022-59-5.
- Kapral, M. (2010). Привілеї національних громад міста Львова (XIV-XVIII ст.) [Privileges of National Communities in the City of Lviv (14th-18th Centuries)]. Lviv: Lvivskyi natsionalnyi universytet im. I. Franka. p. 576.
- Kozytskyi, A.; Bilostotskyi, S. (2001). Кримінальний світ старого Львова [The Criminal World of Old Lviv]. Lviv: Afisha. p. 230. ISBN 966-7760-90-1.
- Kozytskyi, A.; Pidkova, I. (2007). Енциклопедія Львова. Том 1 [Encyclopedia of Lviv. Volume 1]. Lviv: Litopys. p. 656.
- Kozytskyi, A. (2008). Енциклопедія Львова. Том 2 [Encyclopedia of Lviv. Volume 2]. Lviv: Litopys. p. 608. ISBN 978-966-7007-69-0.
- Kozytskyi, A. (2010). Енциклопедія Львова. Том 3 [Encyclopedia of Lviv. Volume 3]. Lviv: Litopys. p. 736.
- Kozytskyi, A. (2012). Енциклопедія Львова. Том 4 [Encyclopedia of Lviv. Volume 4]. Lviv: Litopys. p. 816. ISBN 978-966-8853-23-4.
- Lożynskyi, R. (2005). Етнічний склад населення Львова [Ethnic Composition of Lviv's Population]. Lviv: Lvivskyi natsionalnyi universytet im. I. Franka. p. 358. ISBN 966-613-378-4.
- Ostrovsky, G. (1982). Львов [Lviv]. Leningrad: Iskusstvo. p. 239.
