= Woźny =

Woźny is a Polish surname. Notable people with the surname include:

- Eugene Wozny (1915–1972), American college basketball coach
- Grzegorz Woźny (born 1946), Polish politician
- Paweł Woźny (born 1971), Polish diplomat
- Tomasz Woźny, Polish Paralympic volleyball player
