= Banks in Lviv =

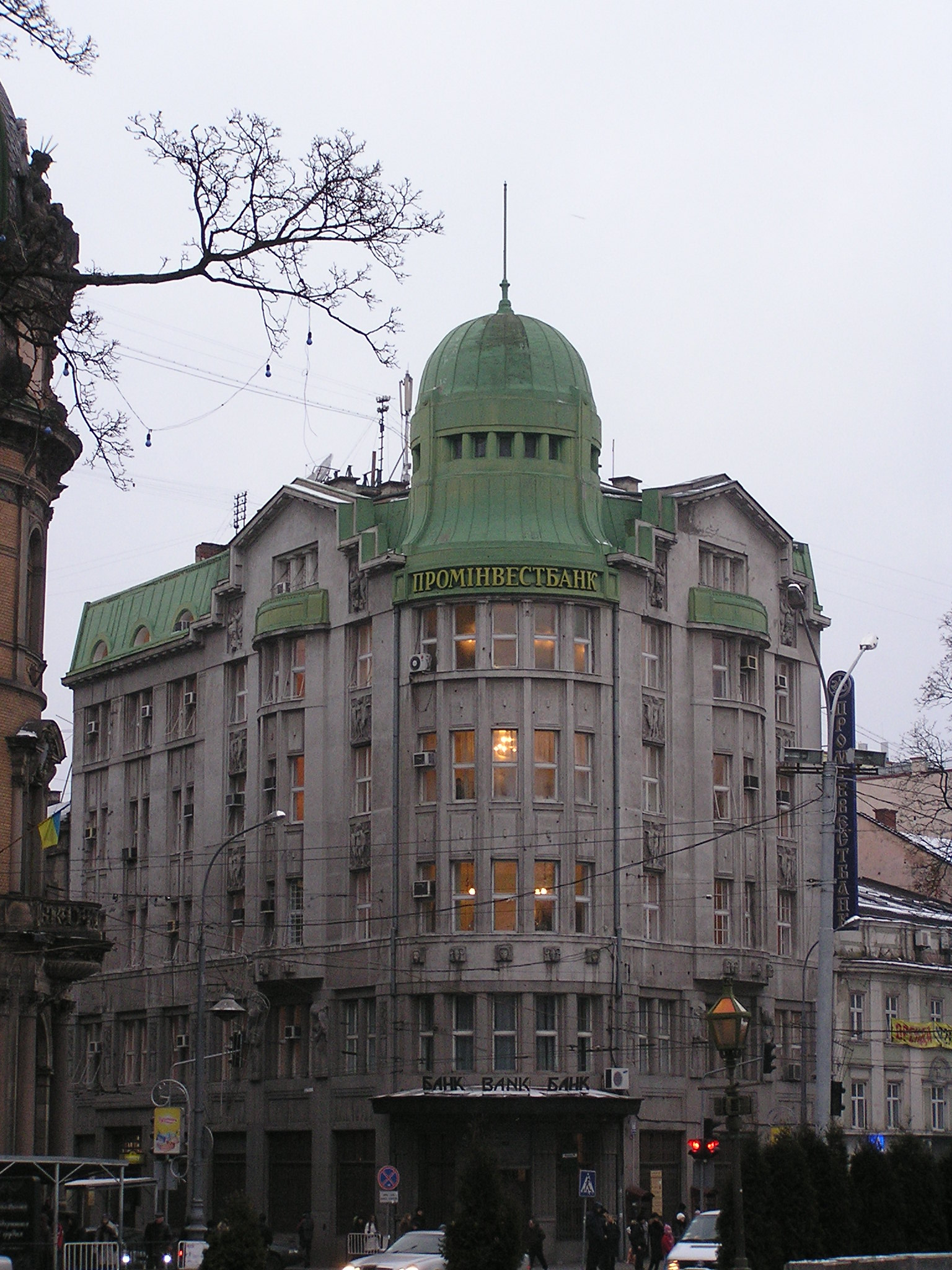
The building of Prominvestbank at 17, Svoboda Avenue

Banks in Lviv covers the history of banking in Lviv, Ukraine. Banking emerged during the Middle Ages and actively developed after Galicia became part of the Habsburg Empire. Initially, loans secured by property were provided by wealthy burghers. Later, the first credit institutions emerged under the largest Lviv confessions, which were eventually replaced by classical banking organizations. During the Austrian period, Lviv's banking system played an important role in the development of regional railway transport and oil production. Additionally, many banks commissioned the construction of monumental buildings for their headquarters and branches.

By the beginning of the 20th century, Austria-Hungary had developed a specific financial system model in which banks were closely linked to industry and railway transport. This model resembled the German financial system, as it was influenced by German financial culture, but it also had its own peculiarities. In the multi-ethnic empire, there were several interconnected financial networks with their own centers in Vienna, Budapest, Prague, Krakow, and Lviv. The entire banking system of Galicia depended heavily on loans from the Austro-Hungarian Bank and foreign banks that operated in Lviv.

The First and Second World Wars caused significant damage to Lviv's banking sector. In 1939–1940, after the annexation of Western Ukraine by Soviet authorities, all commercial banks in Galicia were liquidated. During the Soviet period, regional branches of USSR state banks operated in Lviv, and the first commercial banks were opened in 1990. After Ukraine became independent, banks of various forms of ownership began operating in the city: private, state, and foreign (both local and all-Ukrainian). Lviv's banking system was negatively affected by the financial and economic crises of 1997–1998, 2008–2009, and 2014–2015.

== The first Polish period ==
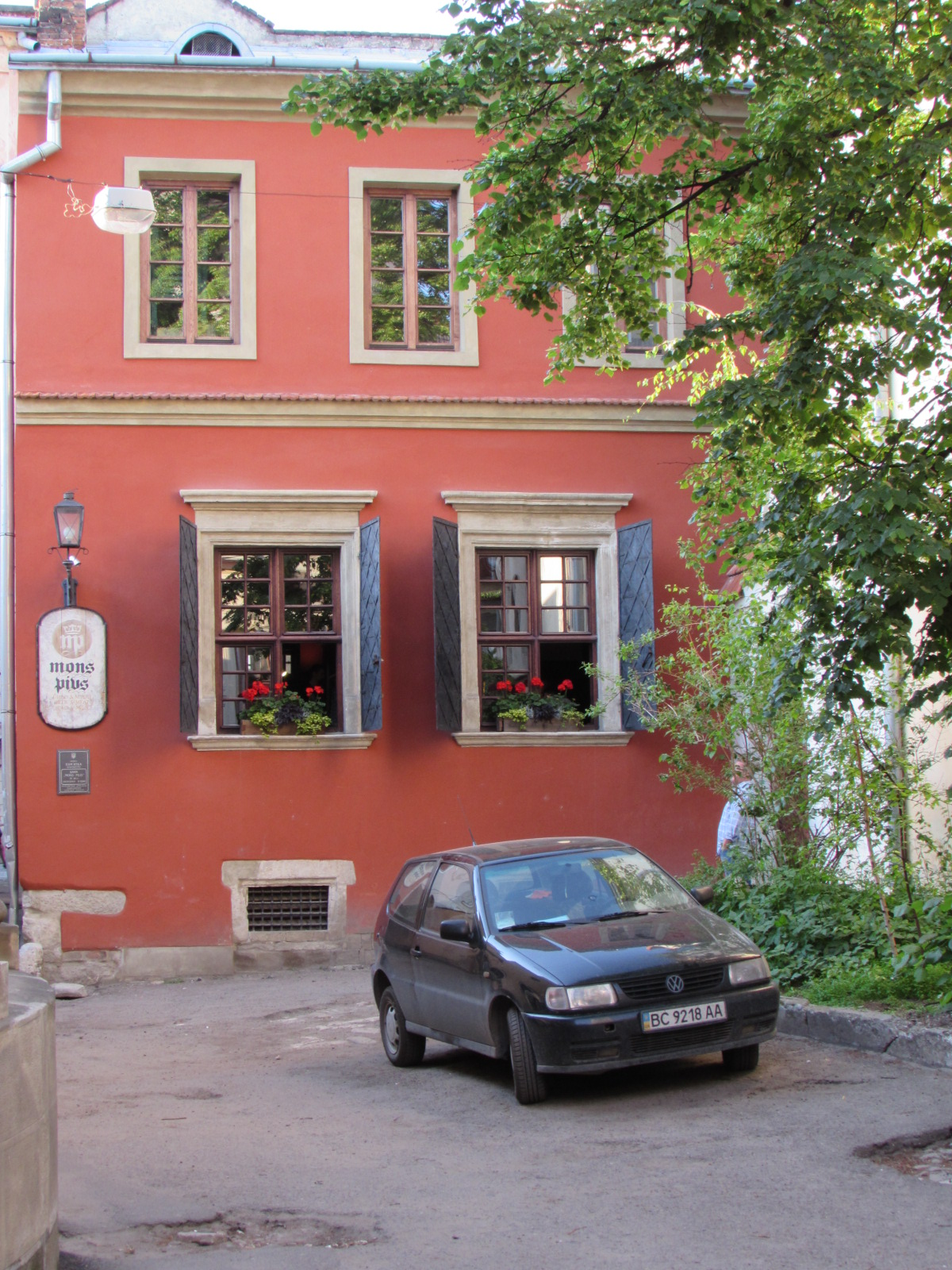
The building of the former Armenian Pious Bank, 14 Lesya Ukrainka Street

In the 15th to 17th centuries, lending to private individuals and city authorities (magistrates) was traditionally carried out by owners of large financial capital who possessed the greatest fortunes in Lviv. The most notable among them were the German Valerian Alembek, the Greek Konstanty Korniakt, and the Polish burgher family Kampianov. In the first half of the 17th century, charitable lending institutions, similar to European religious banks (known by their Latin name Montes pietatis, or Mountains of Piety), began to appear in Lviv, initially specializing in mortgage and short-term loans.

In 1640, St. Gregory's Brotherhood at the Armenian Cathedral founded the first financial institution in Lviv, the Armenian Pious Bank, which operated until 1939. In 1665, a pious bank was founded at the Lviv Catholic Cathedral (for some time, it operated in the Kampian Chapel at the Latin Cathedral). Additionally, since the mid-17th century, the Lviv Dormition Brotherhood assisted its members and later others with interest-free loans.

The charter of St. Gregory's Church Brotherhood, approved by Archbishop Mikołaj Torosowicz, detailed to whom, for how long, and at what interest rates money could be lent, what could be accepted as collateral, and how to deal with debtors. In the first decades of its activity, the Armenian Pious Bank granted loans only to members of St. Gregory's Brotherhood and only for one year, accepting gold, silver, and precious stones as collateral (the collateral had to be worth twice the loan amount). The interest rate at the Armenian Pious Bank was up to 8 percent per annum. If the loan was not repaid within the specified period, the brotherhood reminded the debtor three times; after that, the collateral was sold. After deducting the debt and interest, any remaining money was returned to the client.

In fact, pious banks, especially those established at Catholic cathedrals, were designed to combat the influence of numerous moneylenders (it is no coincidence that the first Lviv pawnbrokers also opened near the Latin Cathedral, operating under the patronage of the clergy and the magistrate. (Note: After a period of wars and decline, the Lviv Pawnshop was reorganized by the Burgomaster Bartolomey Zimorowic, and in 1668 the Catholic Archbishop of the city, Jan Tarnawski, approved a new statute of the institution, according to which the pawnshop was fully owned by the clergy.) Initially, these banks provided interest-free loans secured by real estate, but over time they began to charge customers a low interest rate. Larger loans were issued by Jewish qahal, as well as individual moneylenders among Lviv's Jews and Armenians (the activity of Jewish moneylenders often contributed to antisemitism among the city's residents).

In the second half of the 16th century, the Jewish moneylender Isaac Nachmanovich, who lent money to the Polish nobility and financed the construction of the Golden Rose Synagogue, along with Jewish wine merchants Chaim Cohen and Abraham de Mosso, held significant influence in Lviv. By the mid-17th century, Lviv's Armenian merchants amassed enormous wealth and wielded considerable influence in both the business and political spheres. For instance, the fortune of merchant Jan Varteresovich was estimated at 600,000 zlotys, while the fortune of the richest Polish merchant in the city, Jan Alternmayer, did not exceed 120,000 zlotys. Another Armenian merchant, Christopher Bernatowicz, lent King Władysław IV 300,000 zlotys, and during the siege of Lviv by Bohdan Khmelnytsky's troops in 1648, it was the Armenian community that paid a ransom of 90,000 zlotys.

Despite the establishment of three more banks in Lviv before 1728, under the Armenian brotherhoods of the Holy Trinity, Immaculate Conception, and the Immaculate Conception of the Virgin Mary of Yazlovets, the Armenian Pious Bank remained the largest and most popular among them. In addition to precious metals and stones, Armenian banks began to accept other valuable items, such as weapons, as collateral. For instance, in 1737, the wife of Armenian merchant Andrei Latinovich borrowed 1,080 zlotys from the Armenian Pious Bank, leaving several bronze cannons as collateral.

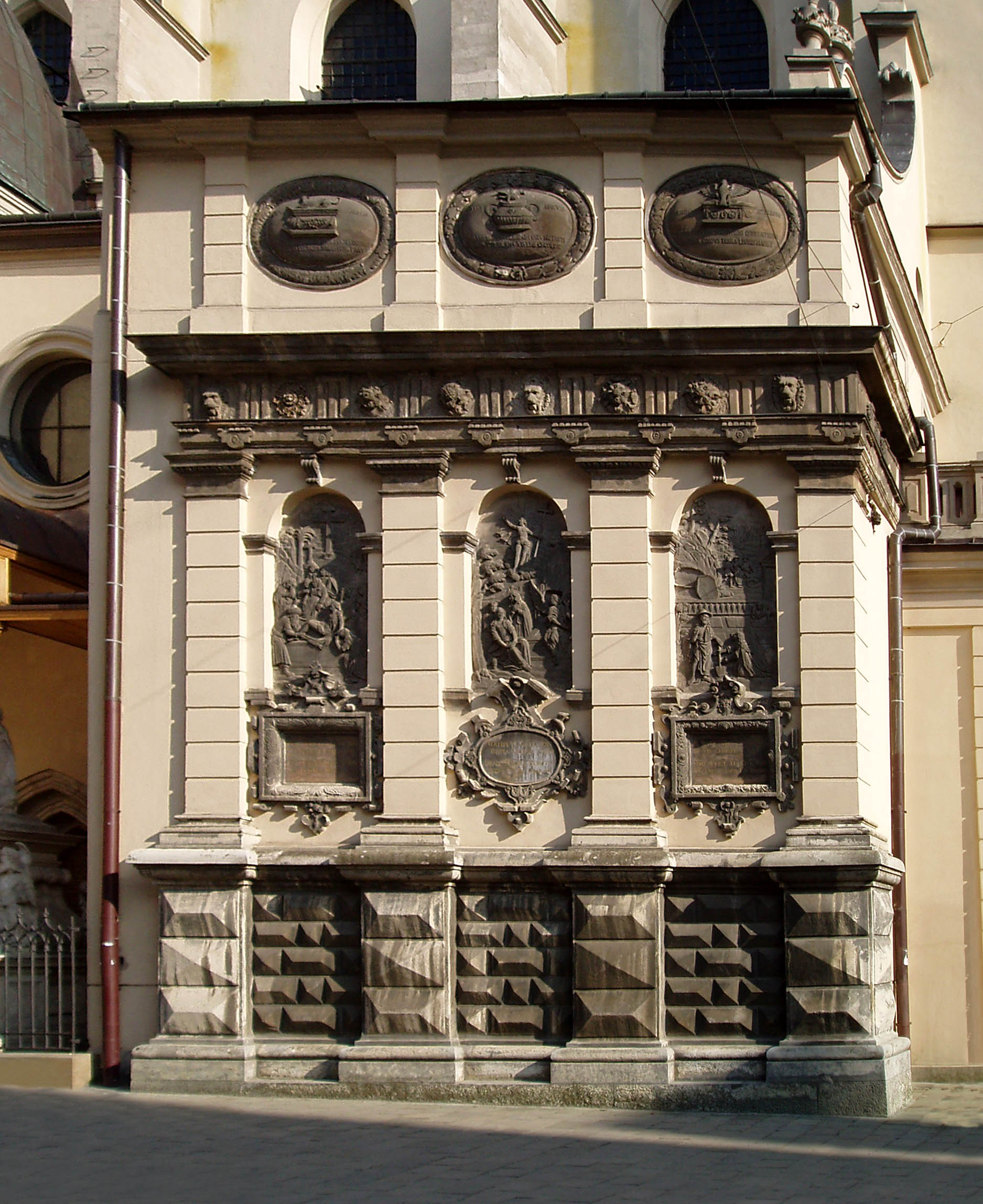
Campian Chapel on the Cathedral Square

Since 1702 to 1745 the assets of the Armenian Pious Bank in cash and pledges amounted from 14,946 PLN to 78,290 PLN. The profits from financial activities were not the only means of replenishing the banking capital of the Brotherhood of St. Gregory. It was not uncommon for the bank to receive donations or bequests of considerable sums. For example, in 1746, Dr. Szymon Krzysztofowicz, a doctor of medicine, donated 9,000 zlotys to the brotherhood (on average, donations ranged from 500 to 3,000 zlotys). Merchants and craftsmen, as well as representatives of the clergy and gentry, were among the clients of the Armenian Pious Bank. Notable clients included Lviv standard-bearer Józef Frantiszek Dzieduszycki, priest Yuri Godzemba Laskaris, influential princely families Lubomirski and Sapegi, and Armenian Archbishop Jakub Stefan Augustynowicz.

Before the first partition of Poland, private bankers were already operating in Lviv, for whom providing financial services had become the main occupation. Additionally, there were bankers' houses whose activities were not yet clearly distinguished from those of trading houses. There were also a number of small credit offices and savings banks that accepted deposits from citizens and residents of the surrounding villages and issued small consumer loans.

== Austrian period ==
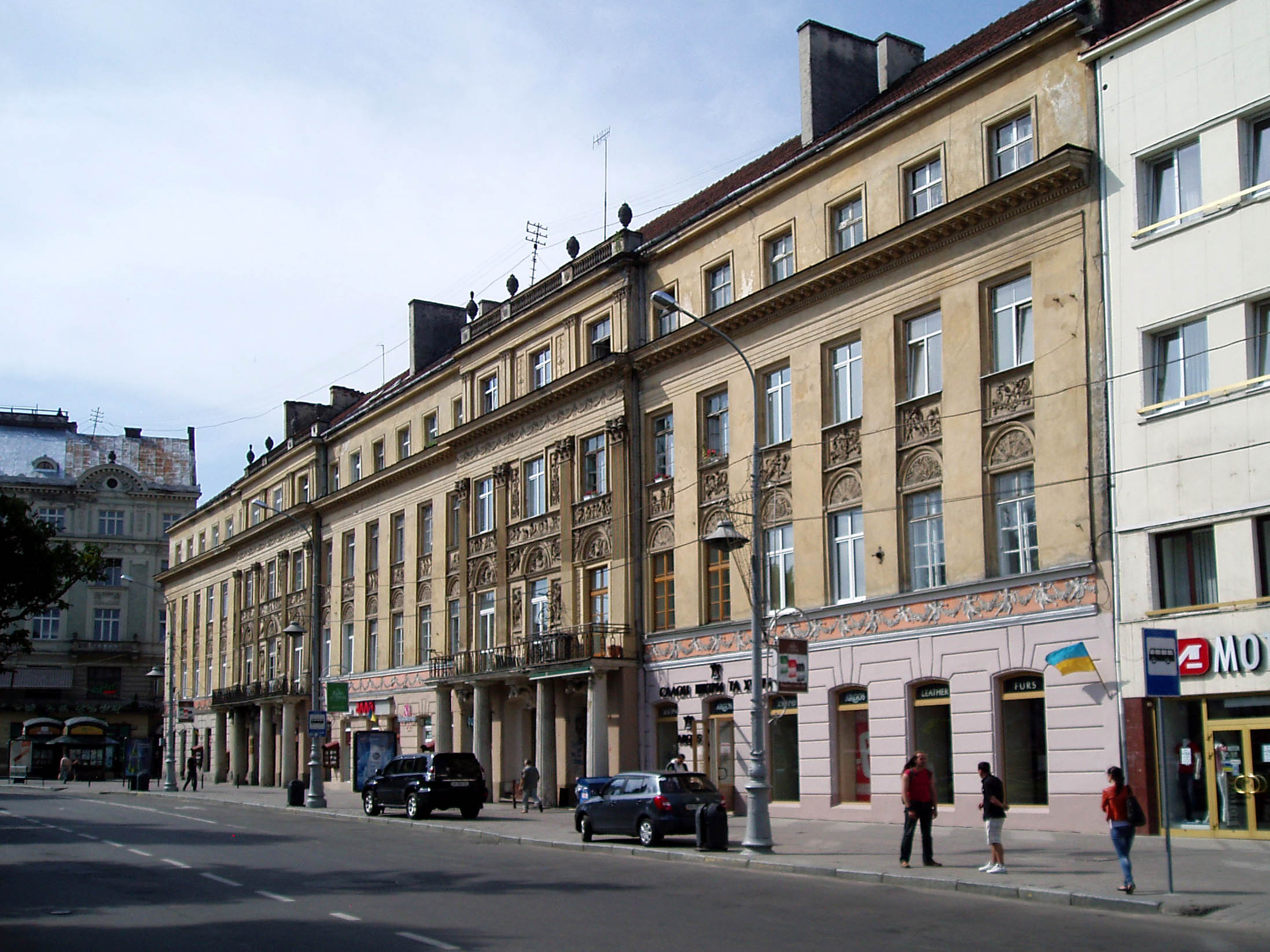
Svoboda Avenue, 1-3

At the end of the 18th century, after Lviv became part of the Habsburg Empire and the reforms of Joseph II, financial activities, including banking, intensified. Lviv Armenians united the capitals of four banks under ecclesiastical confraternities and provincial institutions, reorganizing the Armenian Pious Bank (approved in 1790). The archbishop appointed the director and members of the supervisory board, and the bank's income was divided among the archbishop, the chapter, and the parishes. Part of the income went to help poor parishes, churches, schools, and priests.

During the Napoleonic Wars, the Lviv banking system went through difficult times. In 1810, the Austrian authorities confiscated about 80 kilograms of silver from the Lviv Armenian community, which negatively affected the financial stability of the Armenian Pious Bank. In 1812, the Austrian Empire declared bankruptcy, which led to the bankruptcy of many Lviv banks, including the Armenian Pious Bank. In 1826, the Austrian Savings Bank started its activity in Lviv. In 1829, the first project of the Vienna-Krakow-Lviv railway was developed, supported by the Viennese banker of Jewish origin Solomon Rothschild (this line was intended for the export of salt from Galicia).

In the 1830-1840s there was a period of financial stability in the Austrian Empire, banks managed to regain the shaken confidence of customers. For example, the capital of the Armenian Pious Bank in 1842 exceeded 50 thousand florins (in 1860 it was 150 thousand florins, and in 1881 — 260 thousand). In 1843 the Galician Credit Institute began its activity (in 1868 it changed its name to Galician Land Credit Partnership). In the years 1843-1868 this financial institution was located in the Ossolineum building at 3 Ossolinskieh Street (now the Stefanik Scientific Library at Stefanik Street), in the years 1868–1914 in its own building at Karl Ludwig Street, 1-3 (Svoboda Avenue nowadays). (Note: After its construction in 1822, the building belonged to the merchant and banker house Gausner & Violand.)

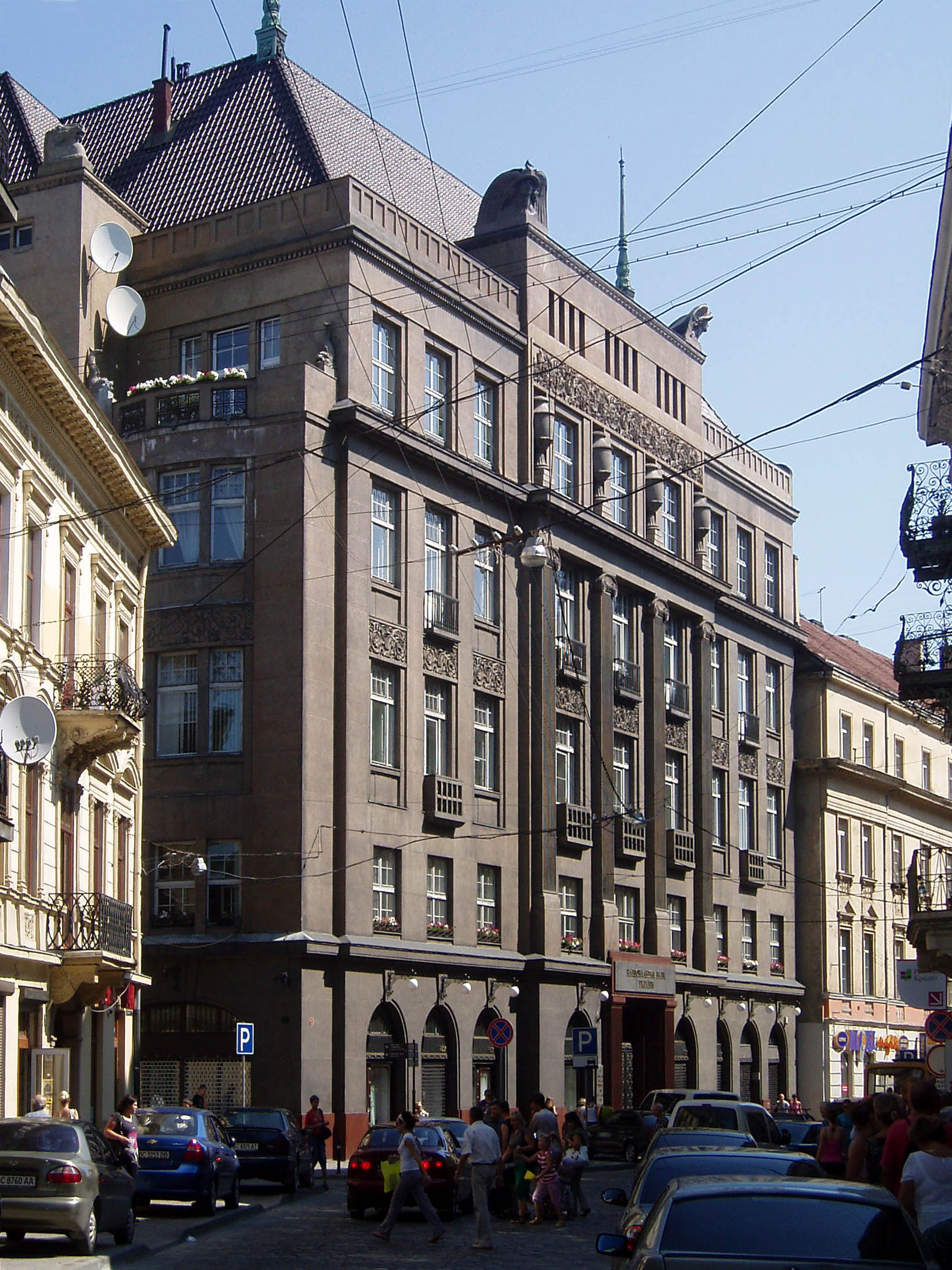
The building of the regional department of the National Bank on Kopernik Street, 4

In January 1844, the Galician Savings Bank was established to collect funds for the construction of the city and the development of industry. In 1846-1891 it was located at 2 Maerovskaya Street (today Sechevye Sagittarius Street), then it moved to Karl Ludwig Street 15 (the building of the bank was built according to the project of the famous architect Julian Zacharewicz, today it houses the Museum of Ethnography and Arts and Crafts). (Note: The sculptural group Berezhlivost in the attic of the building was designed by Leonard Marconi. The central statue holding a torch was influenced by the New York Statue of Liberty by the Frenchman Bartholdi.) Diet of Galicia and Lodomeria guaranteed the clients of the Austrian and Galician savings banks the timely payment of interest and the return of their deposits on demand. Against the background of the Revolutions of 1848 in the Austrian Empire (1848), the Empire began a massive outflow of private capital and the growth of the state budget deficit, which had a negative impact on the banking sector. In 1853, the National Bank of Austria opened a branch in Lviv.

In the first half of the 19th century, Lviv's credit institutions lacked financial resources, which hindered the economic development of the region. The absence of a central bank, the small number of private bankers, and the dominance of Jewish moneylenders made it difficult to provide credit to industry. The aristocracy, which owned large fortunes, preferred to invest abroad. From the mid-19th century, however, a new banking system began to take shape with the emergence of branches of Austrian banks and joint-stock banks. These banks were dominated by the Polish aristocracy, which diluted profits through high dividends.

In the second half of the 19th century, an important role in the financial and economic development of Galicia was played by the activities of such influential Lviv residents as the following ones:

- Prince Leon Sapieha (he was co-owner of the Anglo-Austrian Bank and a number of railroads, Lviv-Krakow and Lviv-Chernivtsi-Yassy);
- Count Aleksander Fredro (initiator of railway construction, one of the founders of the Galicia Land Credit Partnership and the Galicia Savings Bank);
- Count Casimir Badeni (one of the largest landowners in the region), his younger brother Count Stanislaw Badeni (served as vice president of the Galician Land Credit Partnership);
- Count Alfred Potocki (was a wealthy landowner and the builder of a lavish palace);
- Wenzel von Zaleski (was one of the initiators of the Galician Land Credit Partnership);
- Brothers Arthur and Hermann Mises (co-owners of a construction company and investors in a number of railroads, father and uncle of the famous economist Ludwig von Mises).

In 1857, a great financial crisis occurred, which "collapsed" the shares of many Austrian banks and companies. In the same year, the joint stock company Carl Ludwig Galician Railroad was founded by a group of Galician landowners and other Polish aristocrats led by Leon Sapieha, as well as the Rothschild financial group (Creditanstalt Bank and Northern Railway), joined by other Viennese bankers, Eduard von Todesco and Leopold von Lemel. In 1860, Abraham Mises, head of the Jewish community of Lviv, (Note: He was also the father of Arthur and Hermann Mises and the grandfather of Ludwig von Mises.) headed the branch of the Rothschild bank in the capital of Galicia.

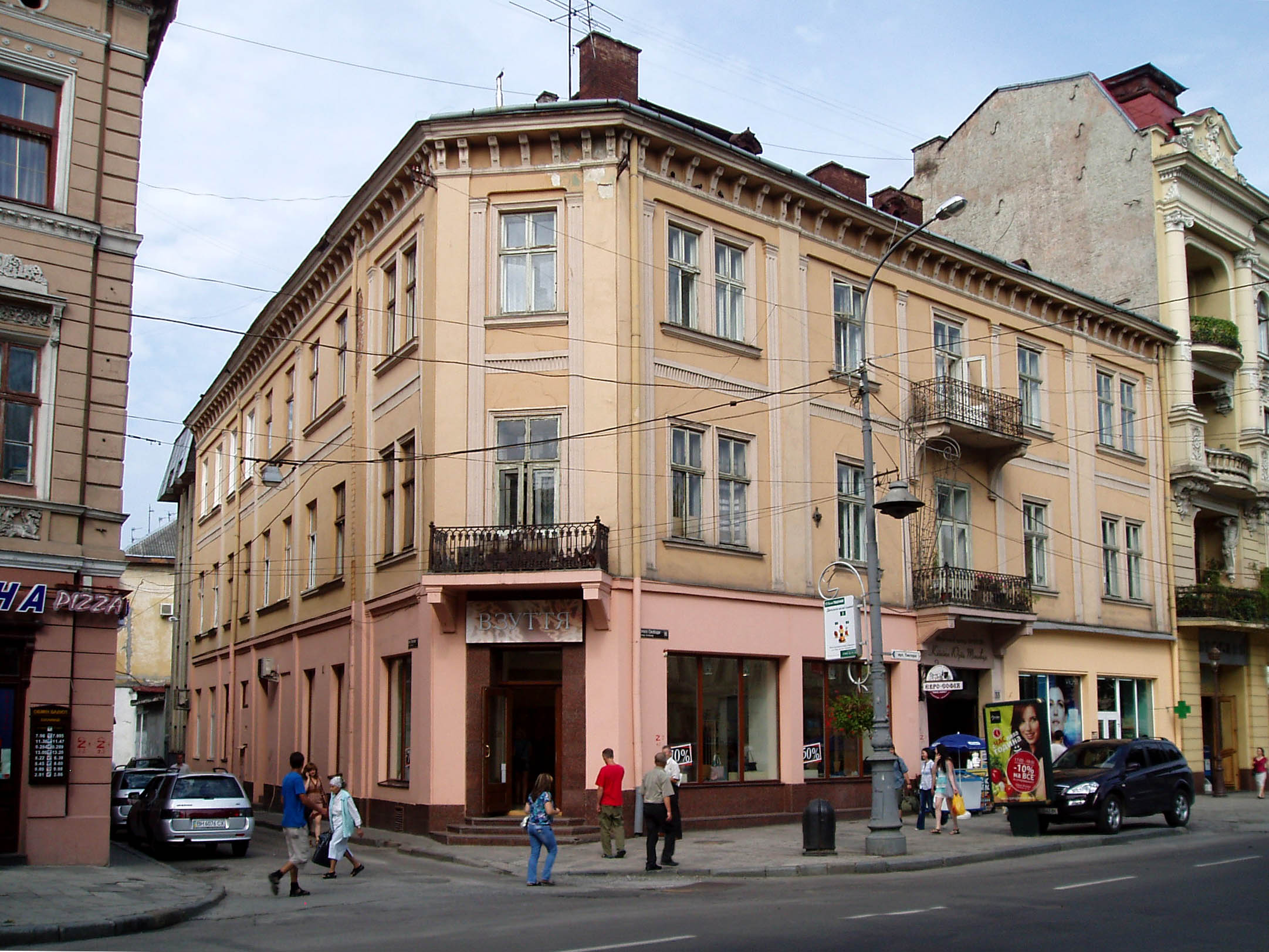
Svoboda Avenue, 33

In the 1860s, the construction of the railroad network in Galicia became a powerful catalyst of progress, which led to the rapid growth of the region's economy and, in particular, banking. On the wave of the "railway boom" in Lviv appeared financial joint-stock companies and branches of many commercial banks in Vienna. In 1866 the Empire was shaken by a new financial crisis, which affected many banks and stock exchanges. In addition, since 1866, when the era of city government began in Lviv, banks became increasingly involved in financing large construction projects and industrial enterprises in the city.

With the beginning of the formation of the modern credit and financial system in Galicia (1860s), mortgage credit was the most common form of credit. Before the emergence of large mortgage banks, loans against land and houses were granted by various types of savings banks and even insurance companies. The first mortgage banks were created by large landowners who secured long-term loans against land (among such banks was the Galician Credit Institute). As mortgage lending flourished in Lviv, mortgage bonds known as Galician bonds and their coupons began to circulate. In addition, in 1856, the National Bank of Austria established a mortgage department, which was also active in Galicia.

In 1862 a branch of the Austrian National Credit Institution for Trade and Industry was opened in Lviv, and in 1865 a branch of the private Viennese Anglo-Austrian Bank was opened, which financed the Lviv-Chernivtsi railroad. In 1867 a branch of the Galician Joint Stock Mortgage Bank was opened. (Note: With the luxurious Georges Hotel across the street, the bank, and especially its currency exchange, was in high demand by foreigners.) In the 1860s the banking houses of Oziasz Horowitz and Schelenberg appeared. In 1869, the Galician Credit Peasant Institution and the Galician Regional Bank, later transformed into the State Regional Bank, began their work. This bank initiated the creation of other banks, such as the Parcellation Bank, the Melioration Bank and the Land Bank, as well as the first investment fund in the region.

In 1869, a branch of the Cracow-Galicia Bank of Commerce and Industry was opened in Lviv at 3 Jagiello?ska Street. In 1872, the General Land and Credit Institution of Galicia and Bukovina was established at 45 Rynok Square. The panic on the Vienna Stock Exchange in 1873 led to a stock market crash and the beginning of the "long depression". In the same year, the Galicia Credit Bank was established, which was located at 4 Walowa Street until 1884, and then at 3 Jagiellonska Street until 1899.

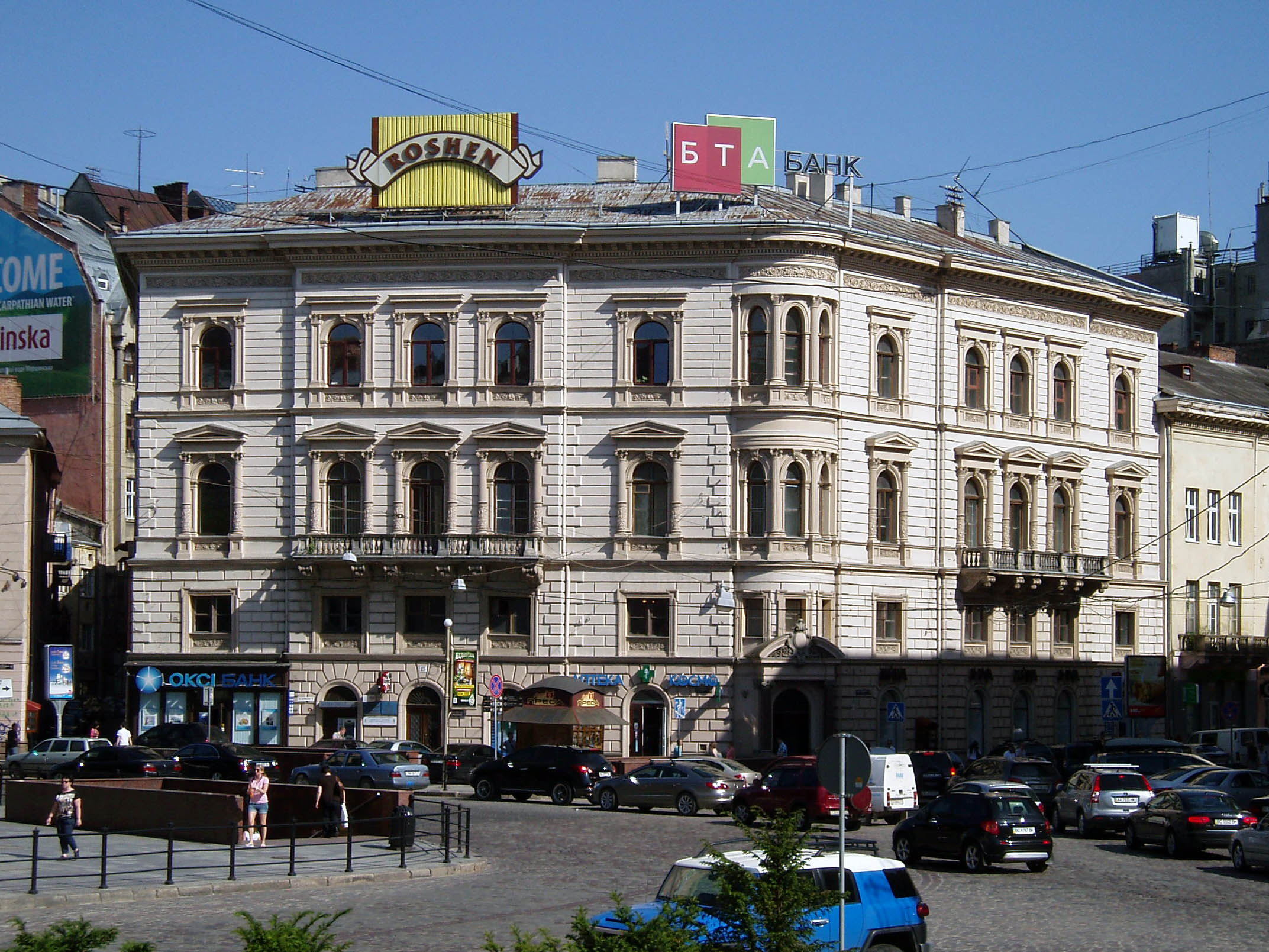
Halytska square, 15

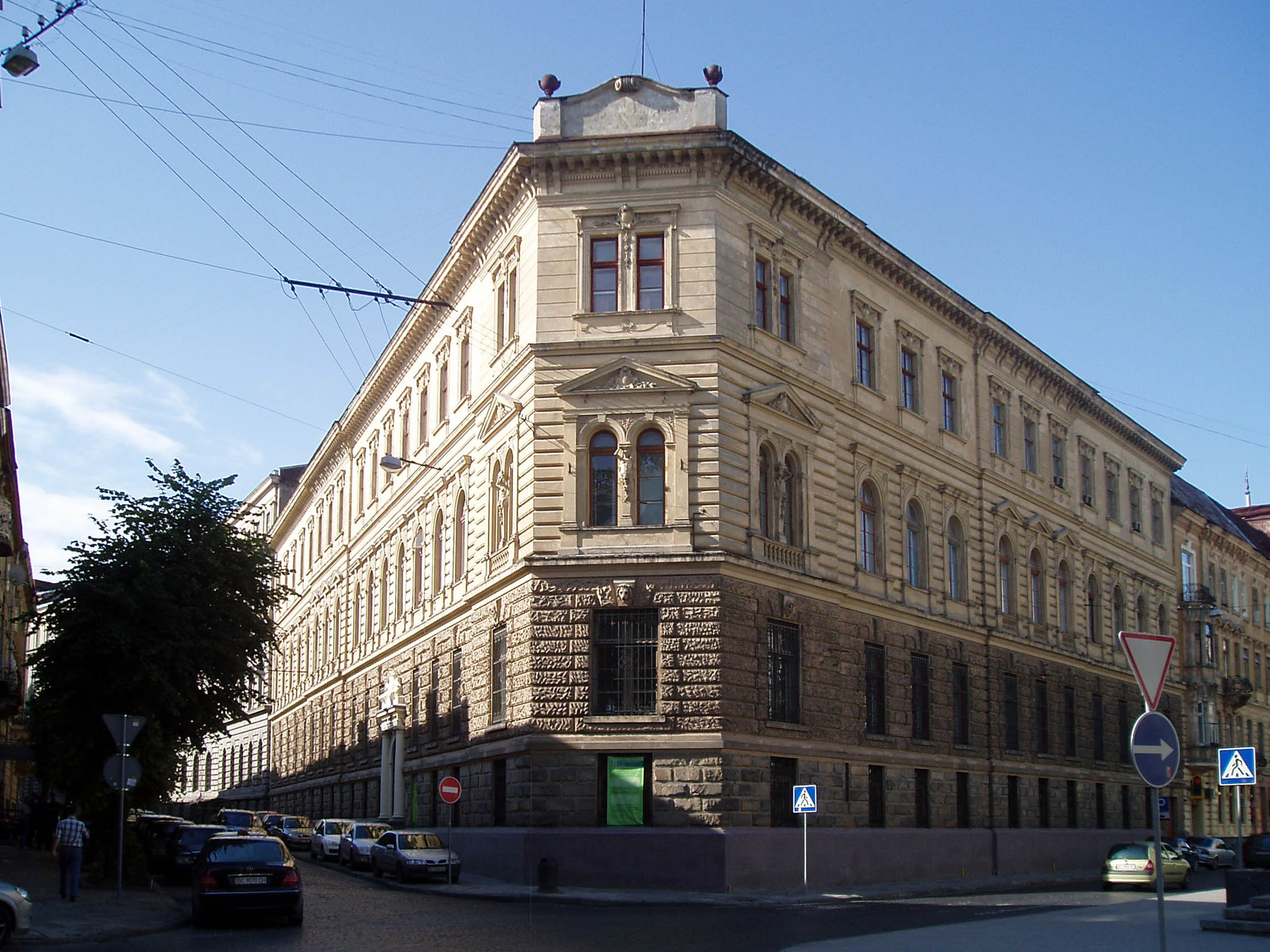
Hryhorenka Square, 2

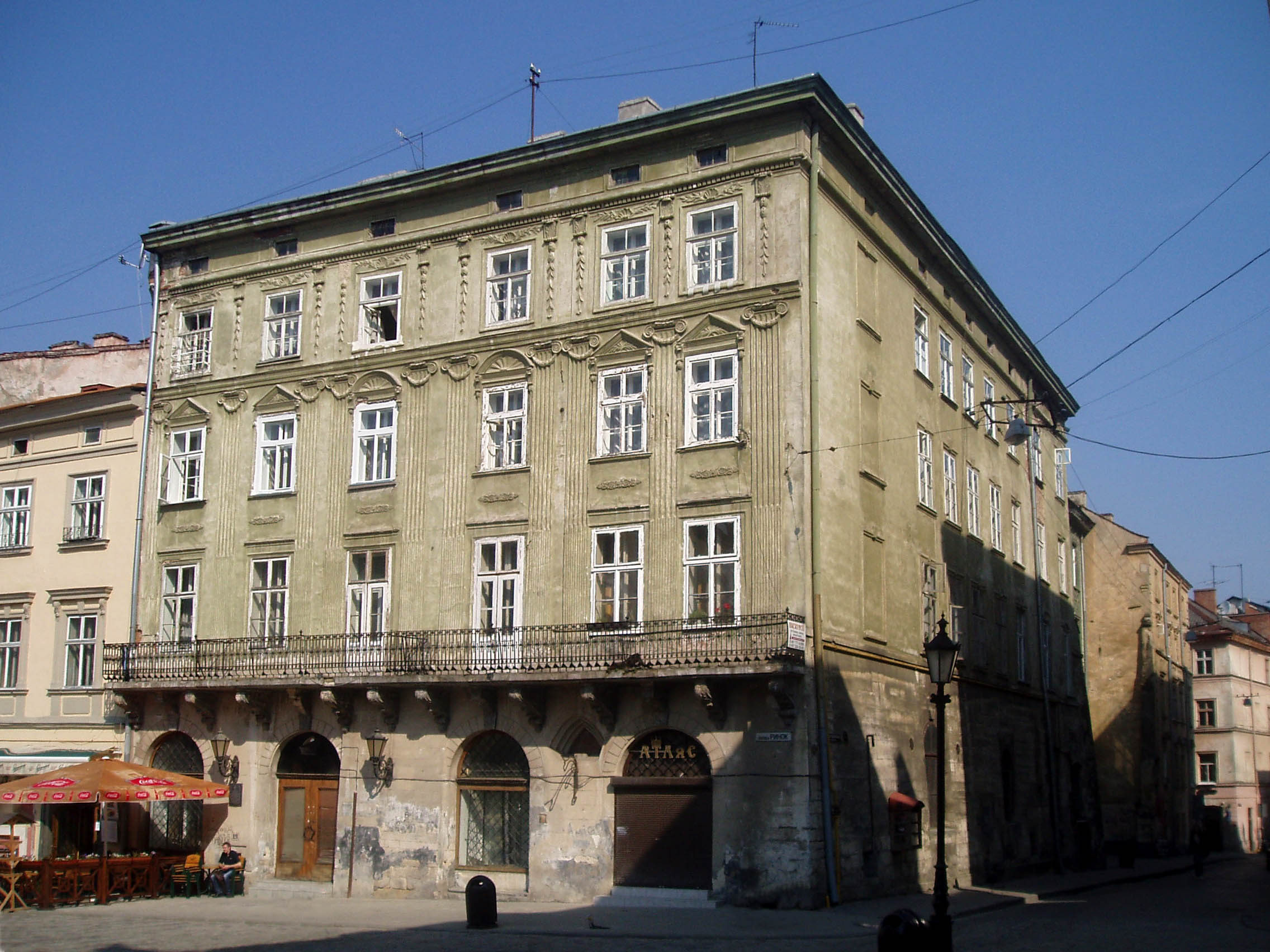
Lviv Market Square, 45

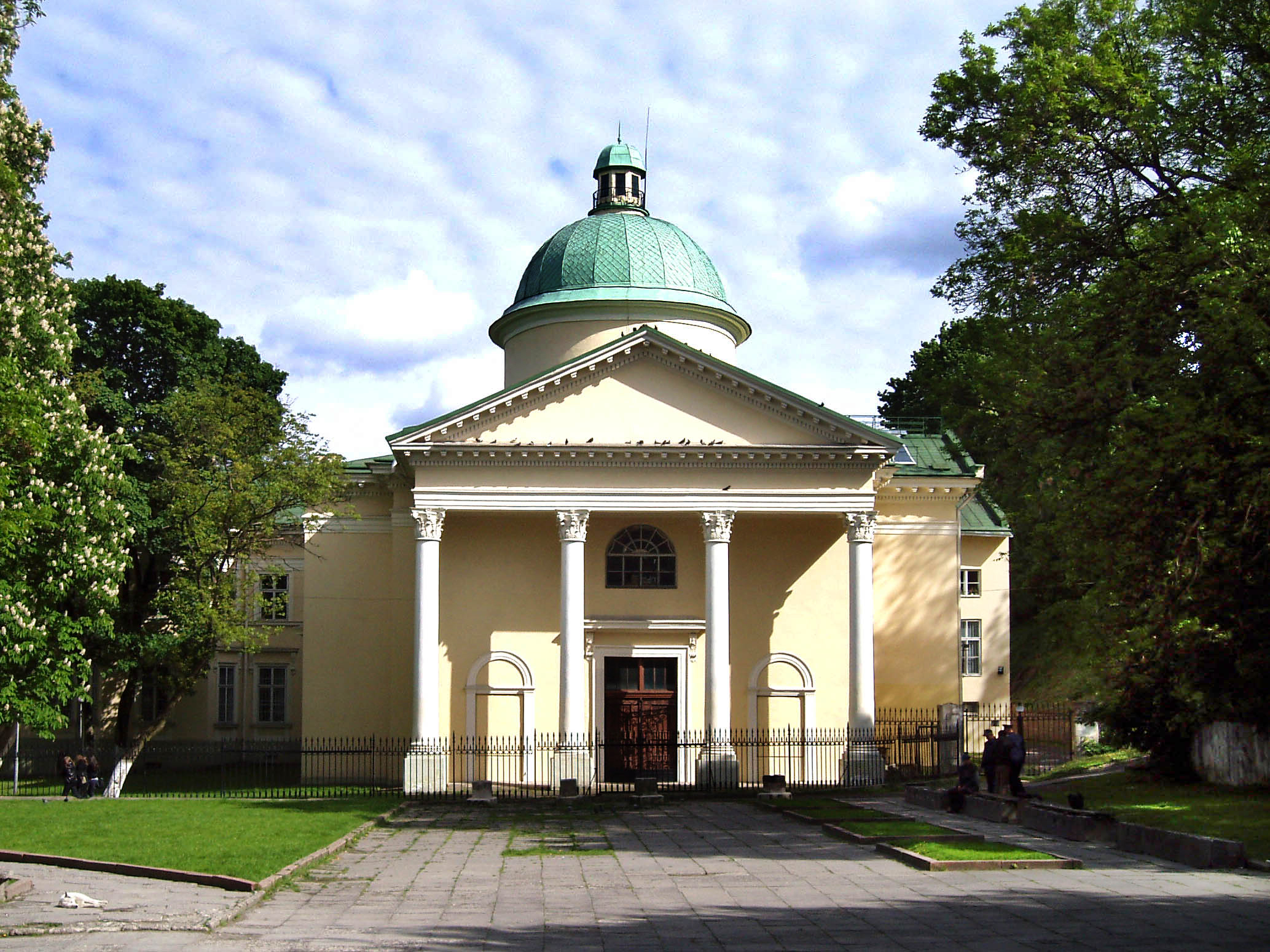
Stefaninka Street, 3

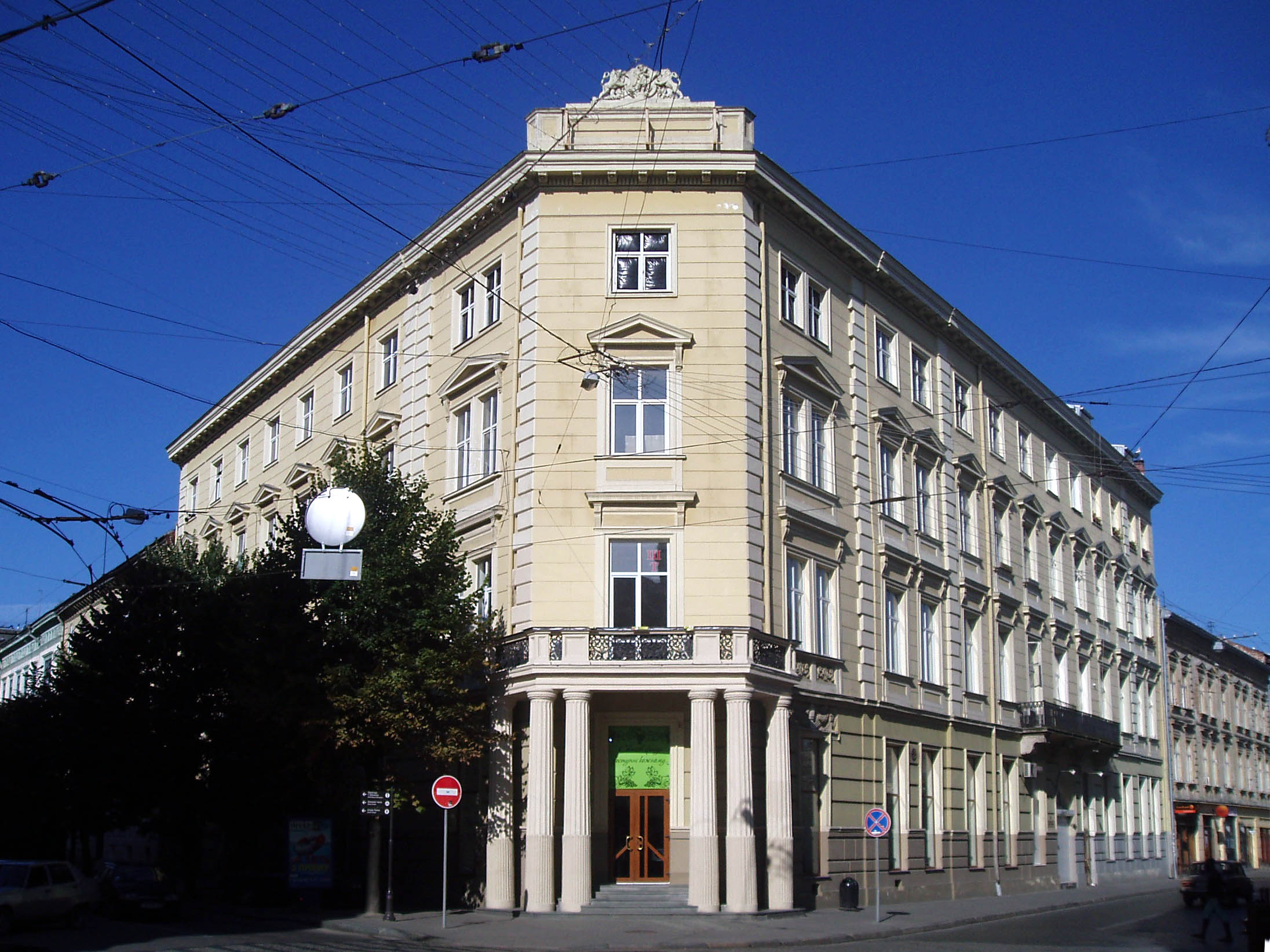
Sichovykh Striltsiv, 2

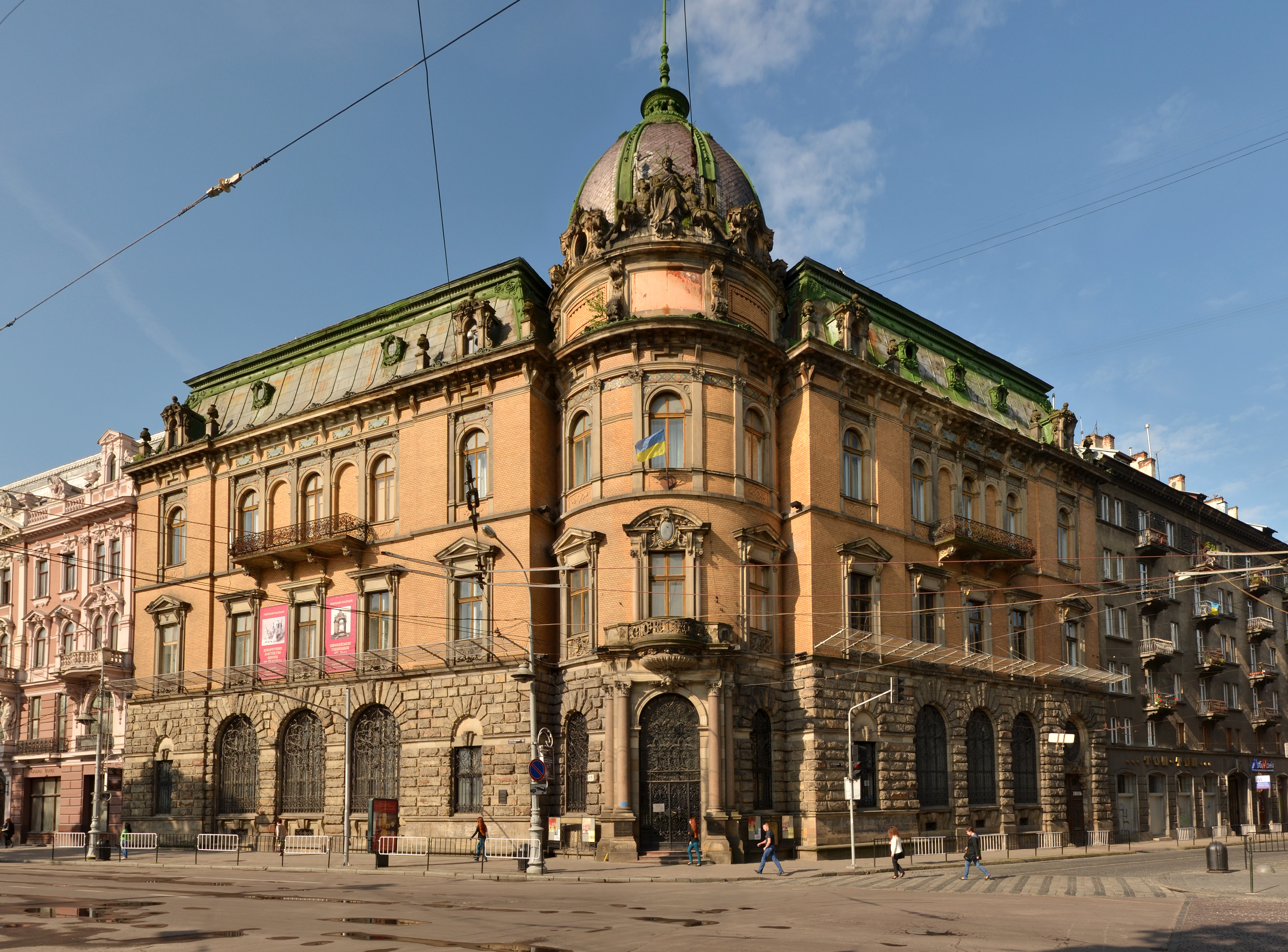
Svobody Avenue, 15

During the financial crisis of 1873, the Galician Joint Stock Mortgage Bank, which granted mortgages to landowners, suffered. The crisis led to the ruin of joint-stock companies and the suspension of railway construction, but a stabilization loan from the Rothschilds prevented the collapse of the system. In 1875, a branch of the Austrian Credit Institution opened in Lviv, as well as the Krakow Mutual Protection Partnership and the Galicia General Protection Partnership. In 1878 the Austro-Hungarian Bank, which had a monopoly on issuing banknotes, began to operate. The Lviv City Credit Partnership, the Industrial Bank and the Petroleum Bank were also established at that time. In 1875, a branch of the royal privileged Austrian Credit Institution for Trade and Industry was opened in Lviv (Karl Ludwig St., 33). In the same year, the Krakow Mutual Protection Society was opened in the city (Karla Ludwig St., 3). Its competitor was the Galicia General Protection Partnership, which insured citizens and their property (located at Skarbkowska St., 2 which is now Lesia Ukrainka St.)

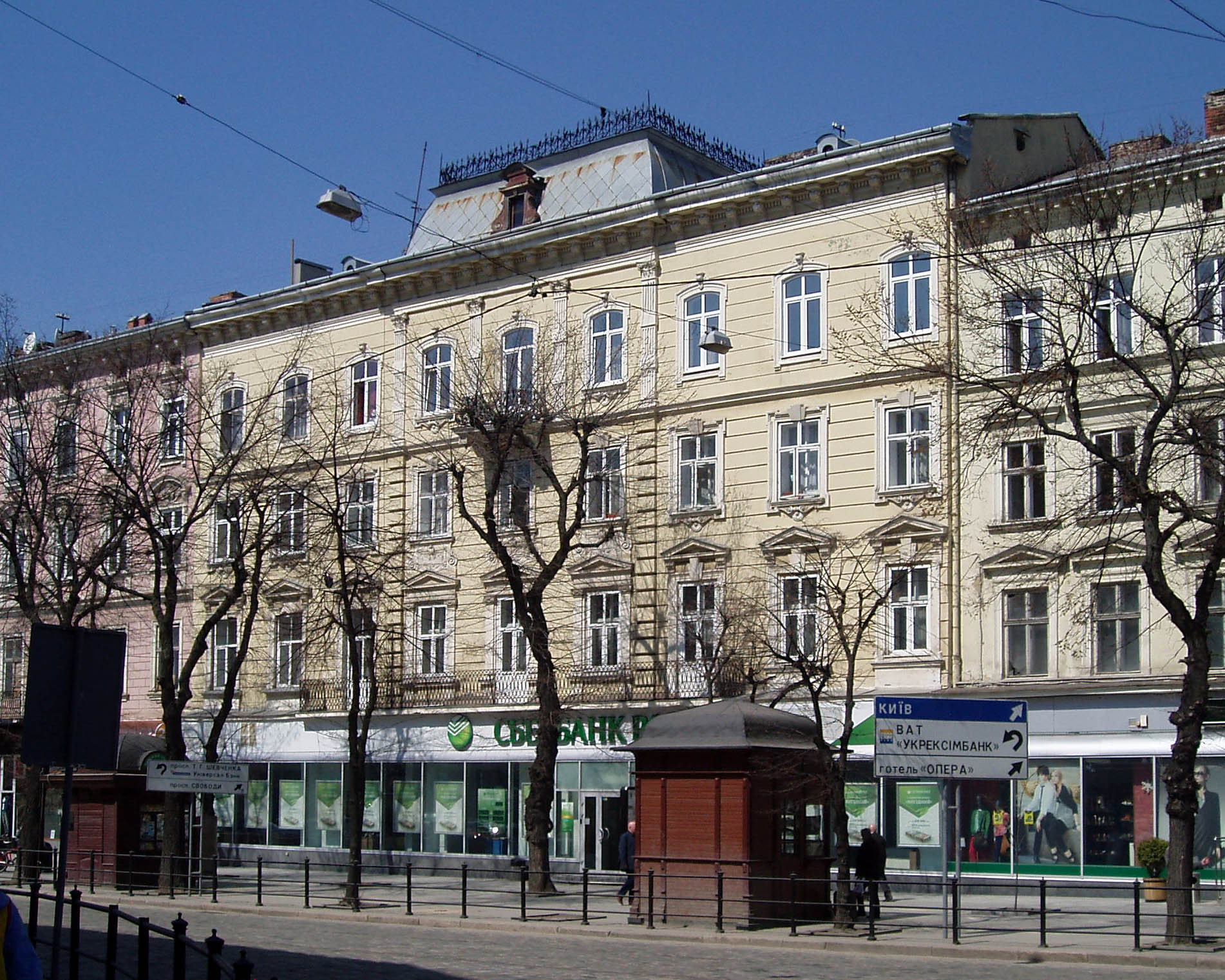
Valova Street, 4

In 1878, the Austro-Hungarian Credit Institution for Trade and Industry was opened in the city. In 1889-1894 it was located at 10 Mariacka St. (today the modern office of Ukrsotsbank is located in the place of the old house), and until 1914 — at Kosciuszko St., 7. In the same year a branch of the newly established Austro-Hungarian Bank, which had a state monopoly on issuing Austrian banknotes, began to operate in Lviv. At first it was located at 1-3 Karl-Ludwig Str. In 1891, it moved to 9 Maerovskaya Str. (this house, designed by Julian Zakharevich, was built by the Viennese office of Helmer and Fellner, today it houses the regional directorate of Oschadbank). In 1912, the Austro-Hungarian Bank moved into a house built especially for it at Mickiewicza Street, 8 (today: November Uprising or Listopadowy Chinu Street), the architects of which were Michał Lużecki and later Edmund Zychowicz. In addition, in 1878 in Lviv began its activities Lviv City Credit Partnership and Industrial Bank of the Kingdom of Galicia and Lodomeria. In 1880, the joint-stock Oil Bank was founded, and in 1881, the Land Bank opened (first located at Karl Ludwig Street 1, moved to Maerovskaya Street 2 in 1890, to Smolka Square 5 in 1895, and now on General Grigorenko Square — the old building has not survived, and the new one houses the Lviv spiritual theater Resurrection). In 1914, it relocated to Kopernik Street, 20. Between 1883 and 1888, an agrarian crisis broke out in Galicia, leading to the ruin of many farms and a reduction in mortgage lending against agricultural land. In 1892, to provide loans for the purchase of land plots, the Parcelation Society Zemlya was founded (in 1924, the society was renamed the Cooperative Bank Zemlya, which existed until 1938).

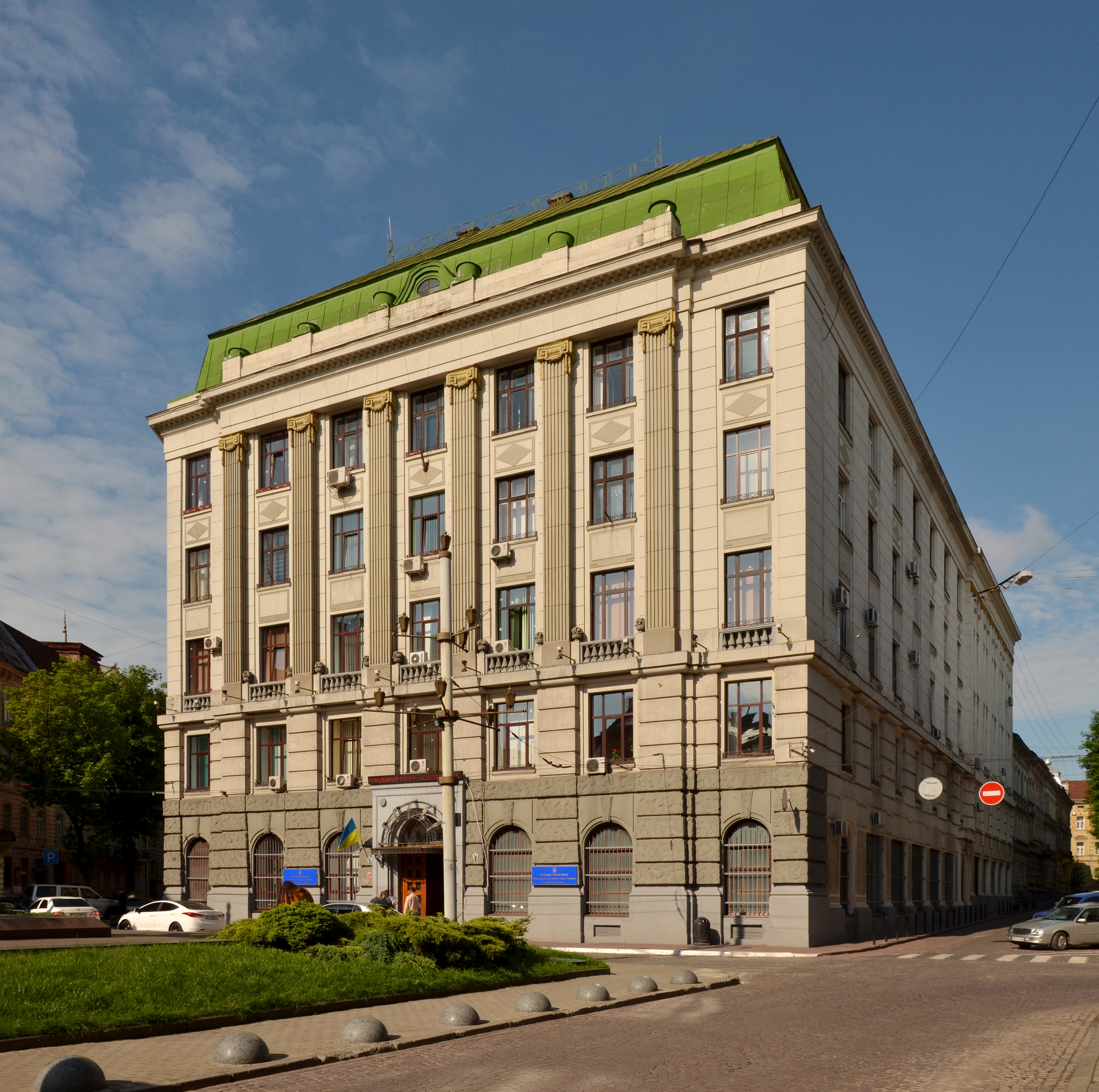
Hryhorenka Square, 3

In 1884, the bankruptcy of the royal privileged Galician Peasant Credit Institution, better known as the Rustikalny Bank or Peasant Bank, caused a great resonance. Created to provide credit to small landowners in Galicia and Bukovina, it specialized in long-term (up to 14 years) and short-term (one year) loans secured by land. Long-term loans were issued with mortgage certificates, while short-term loans were issued in cash. The bank also issued bonds and mortgage notes, and its shares were listed on the Vienna Stock Exchange. Among the initiators of the Peasant Bank were the brothers Zygmund and Nikolai Romashkany, the president of the Lviv-Chernivtsi Railroad, Prince Karol Yablonovsky, Metropolitan Spyrydon Lytvynovych, and Julian Lavrovsky, an advisor to the Supreme Regional Court. During its existence, the Peasant Bank granted more than 70 thousand loans totaling 30 million crowns, and the volume of mortgaged peasant lands amounted to 600 thousand morg. Every twentieth peasant in Galicia was a debtor of the bank, and every twelfth farm that borrowed money was sold for debt, which ultimately caused the prices of pledged agricultural land to collapse.

In 1886, the General Agricultural and Credit Institution of Galicia and Bukovina, better known as the Kryloshansky Bank, went bankrupt due to numerous unsecured loans, insolvency of debtors, unprofessional management, and speculative activities of employees. It issued loans with mortgages on land and houses, mainly in small towns. In 1884, when the bank and thousands of its shareholders were threatened with ruin, the priest and writer Ivan Naumovich, known for his Muscovite sympathies, undertook to help the institution. In August 1884, Naumovich went to St. Petersburg and negotiated a loan of 600,000 German marks. When this was not enough, in early 1885, he went again to the capital of the Russian Empire and convinced Alexander III to allocate another 650,000 marks. (Note: In addition, Lviv banker Adolf Lilien tried to save the bank with 60,000 marks. Lilien's son Edward was a friend of the writer Ivan Franko, who covered the bank's bankruptcy in the press.) However, all these injections did not save the Kryloshansky Bank, which was at the epicenter of a severe agrarian crisis that affected Galicia.

In 1887, by decision of the Galician Sejm, a fund for industrial aid was established. At the end of the 1880s, the National Bank of Austria began investing in the authorized capital of companies in Galicia, which the authorities considered important for the national interests of the Empire. At the same time, the oil industry in Boryslaw and Kolomyia began to gain momentum, with the development of wells, refineries, and railroads. Many European banks (mainly through their branches and representative offices in Lviv) participated in financing oil companies. For example, the Warsaw Trade Bank lent money to Standard-Nobel. Local industrialists Stanislav Szczepanowski and Ignacy Lukasiewicz, Counts Turn-and-Taxis, and even Metropolitan Andrey Sheptytsky became wealthy from the extraction and refining of Galician oil.

At the end of the 19th century, credit, consumer, and trade cooperatives, savings banks, and credit unions of the Schulze and Raiffeisen systems were actively established in Lviv. Along with Austrian and Polish banks, Ukrainian financial institutions successfully operated in the city. In 1889, the Ukrainian Land Bank was opened at Armianskaya St., 2 in 1892, the Dnestr Mutual Protection Partnership (Podvalnaya St., 11) began its work, and in 1894, the Dnestr Cooperative Bank (located at the same address as the Partnership). In 1895, the Dnestr Cooperative Association and the bank of the same name moved to Rynok Square, 10 to the Lubomirsky Palace, which was bought by the Ukrainian company Prosvita, and in 1906, they moved to their own building at Russkaya Street, 20. This building was constructed on the site of the former palace of Orthodox metropolitans, which Lviv Bishop Yosyf Shumlyansky bought from a Greek merchant at the beginning of the 18th century (today it houses a polyclinic).

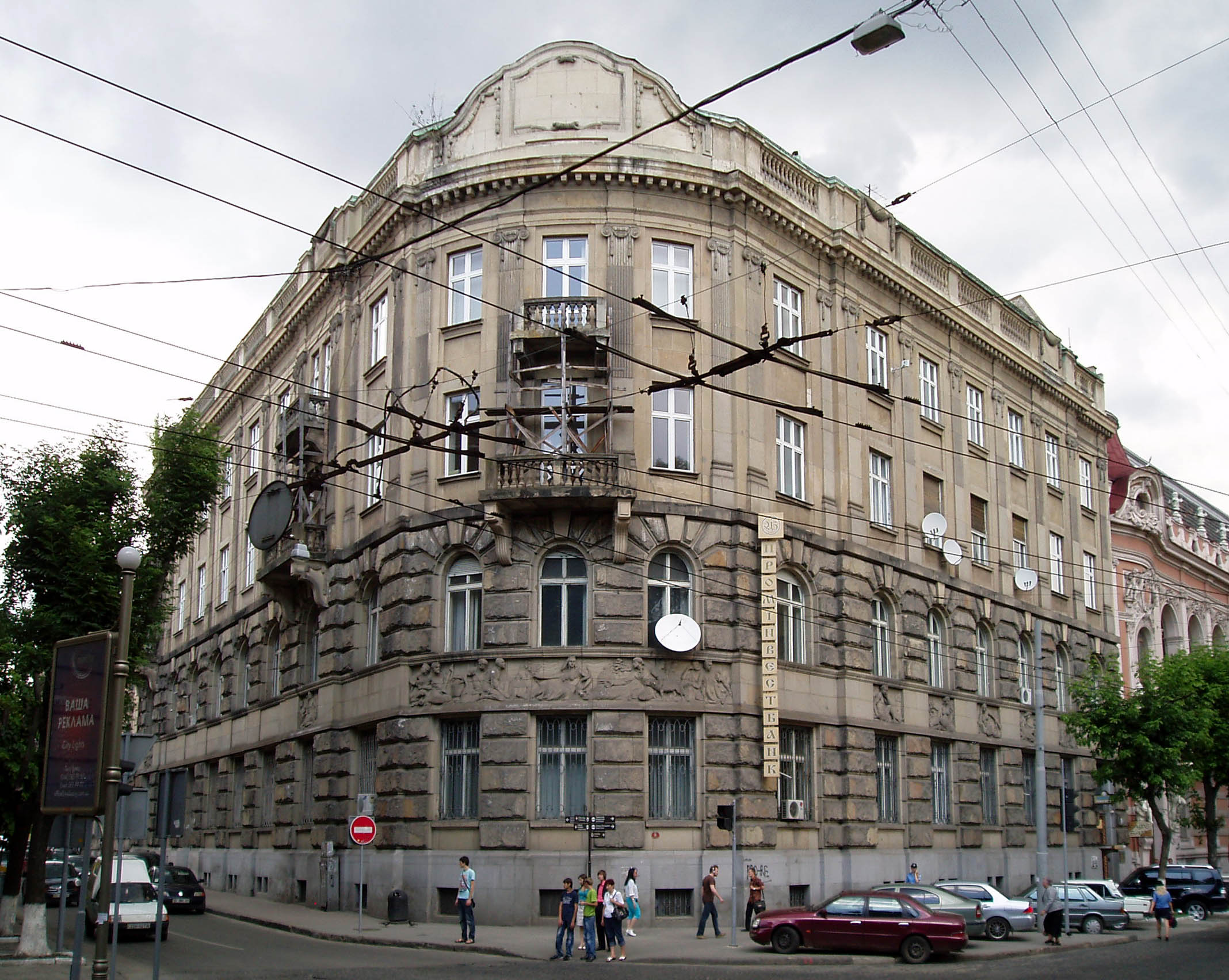
Noyabrskoye Vosstaniye Street, 8

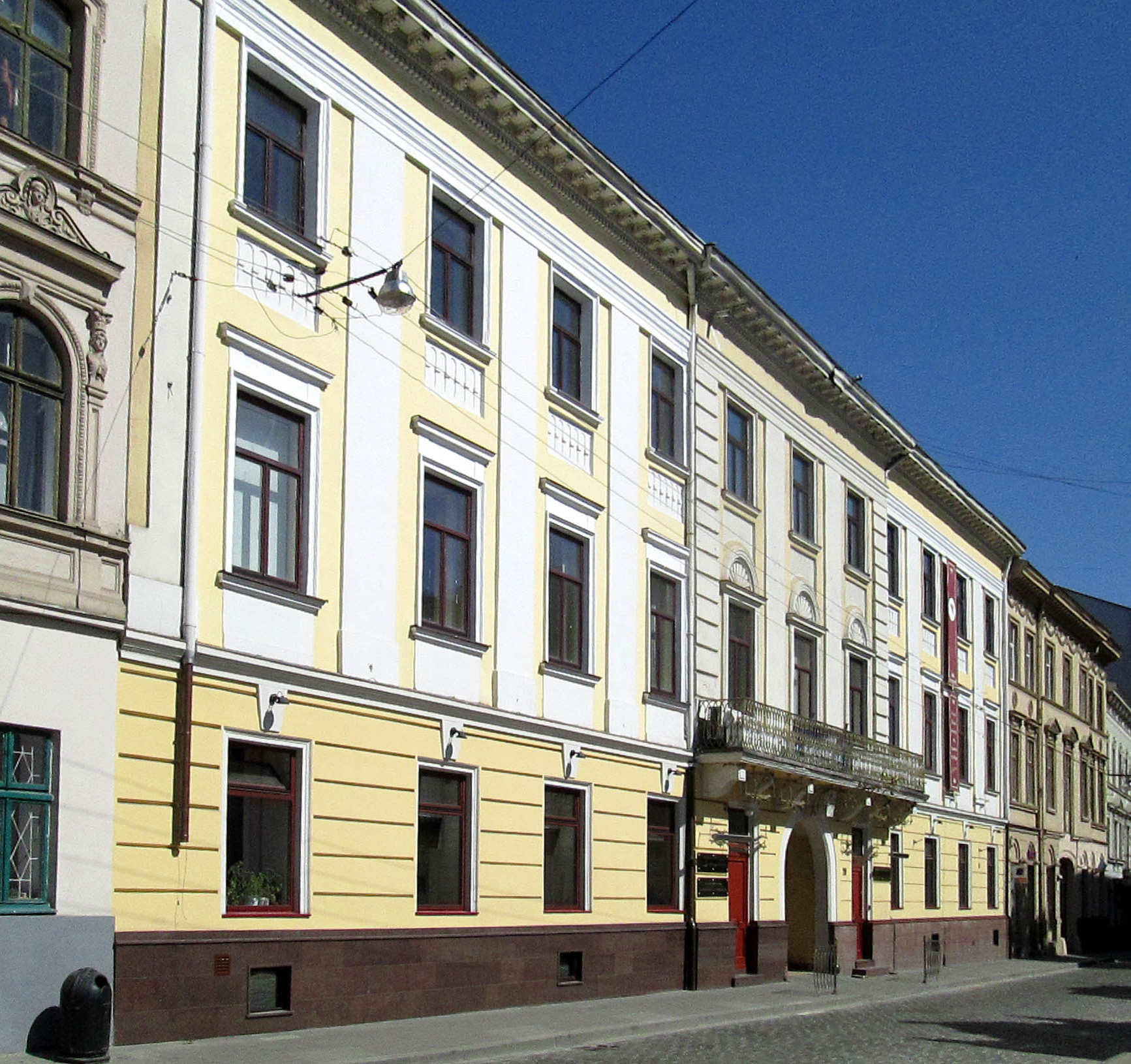
Kopernyka Street, 20

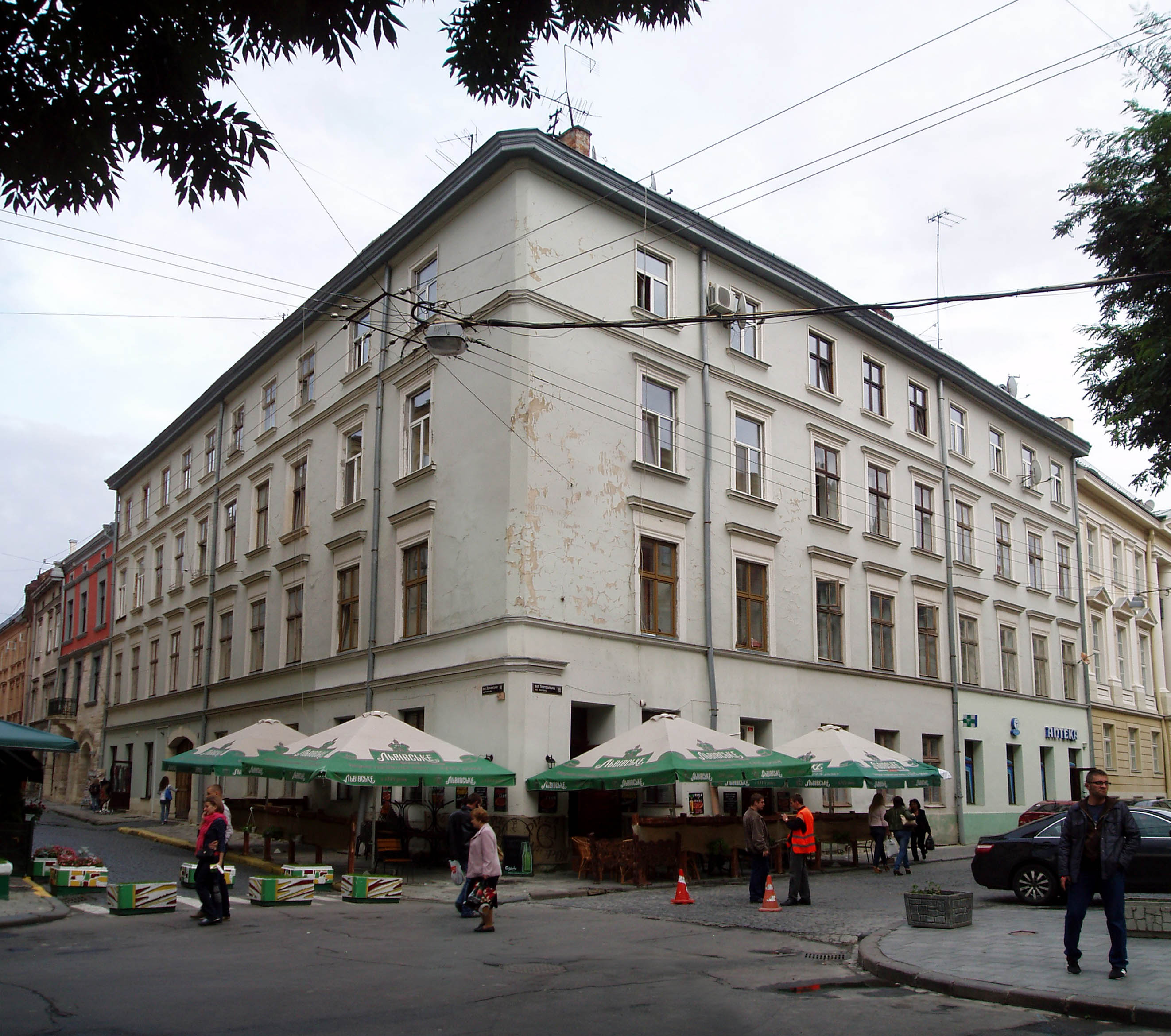
Armyanskaya Street, 2

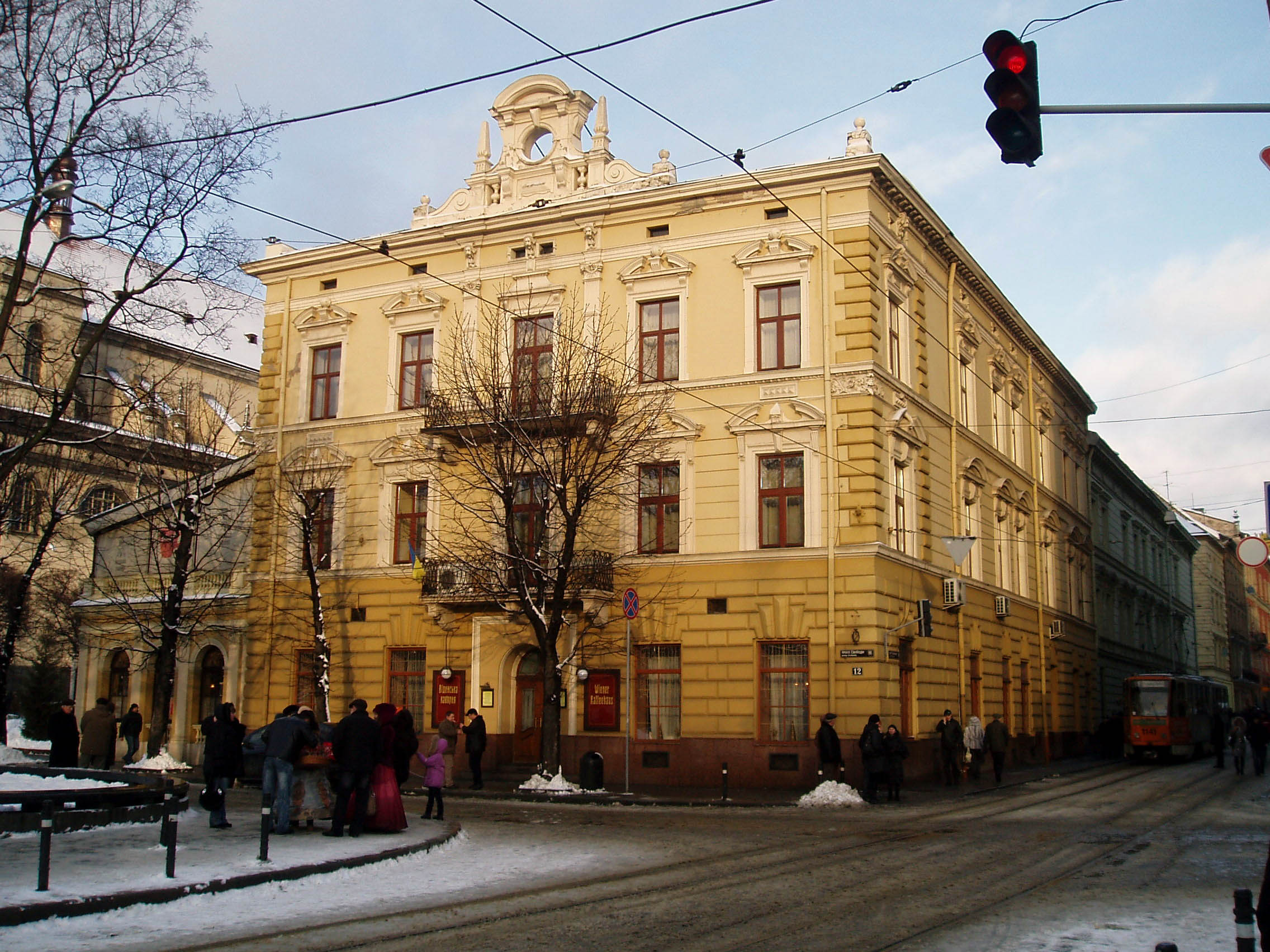
Svoboda Avenue, 12

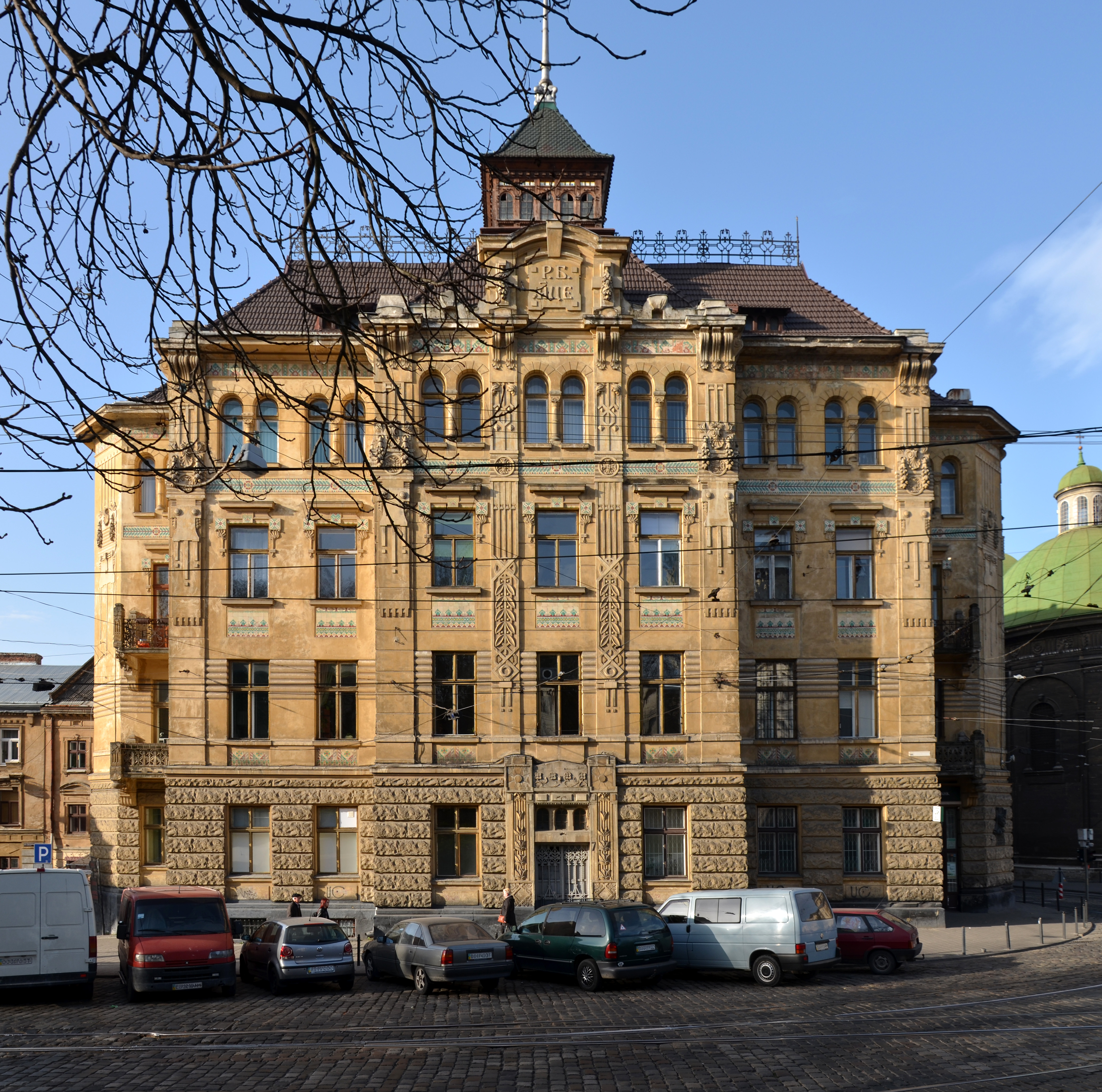
Russkaya Street, 20

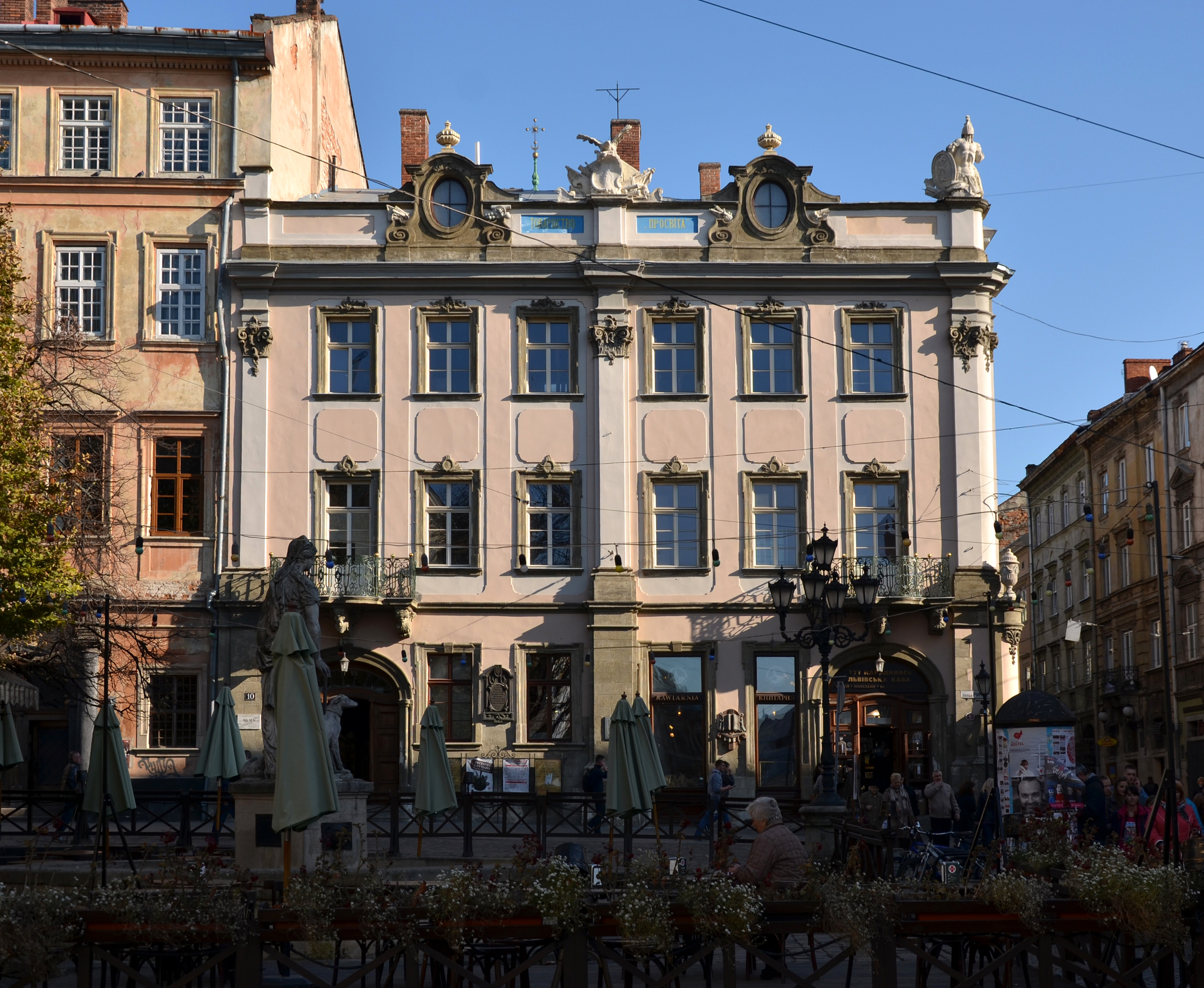
Rynok Square, 10

In 1894, the Advance Bank, the Prague Mutual Protection Bank, the Max Gustav Banking House and the Lviv Branch of the State Agricultural Bank were established in Lviv. In 1896 the Bank of Sokal and Lilien appeared, in 1898 the Ukrainian Cooperative Regional Credit Union, and in 1900 the Bank of Schutz and Gajec. By 1900, there were five banks in Galicia, three of which were joint-stock banks. The share capital increased from 9.2 million to 22.3 million crowns and the issue of mortgage bonds from 255.5 million to 469.6 million crowns. The State Regional Bank doubled its capital to 7.1 million crowns and deposits to 35.4 million crowns in 10 years.

The most important bank was the Lviv branch of the National Bank of Austria-Hungary, which granted loans to enterprises and carried out mortgage transactions. At the beginning of the 20th century, almost half of the state bank's mortgage transactions were in Galicia. The largest local banks were the State Regional Bank and the Galician Joint Stock Mortgage Bank. The number of savings and credit societies increased from 119 in 1880 to 730 in 1901. In 1902, the total balance of Galician credit societies amounted to 4.3 million crowns.

The financial crisis of 1899–1902, also known as the Industrial Crisis or Crisis of Overproduction, had a significant impact on the economy of Galicia. There was a notable decrease in foreign investment in the region, the scale of many construction projects, which employed almost half of the workforce, was reduced, and the demand for oil dropped significantly. This led to a decrease in prices and revenues for oil companies and related banks (between 1900 and 1903, crude oil prices fell 2.4 times).

As a result of the financial crisis that ended the economic boom of the second half of the 1890s, the Galician Credit Bank, led by land magnate Adam Sapieha, the eldest son of Leon Sapieha, went bankrupt in 1899 (Adam had to return several million crowns to his depositors to salvage his shattered reputation). Additionally, Stanislav Szczepanowski's companies went bankrupt, bringing the Galician Joint Stock Mortgage Bank, closely linked to his industrial group, to the brink of collapse.

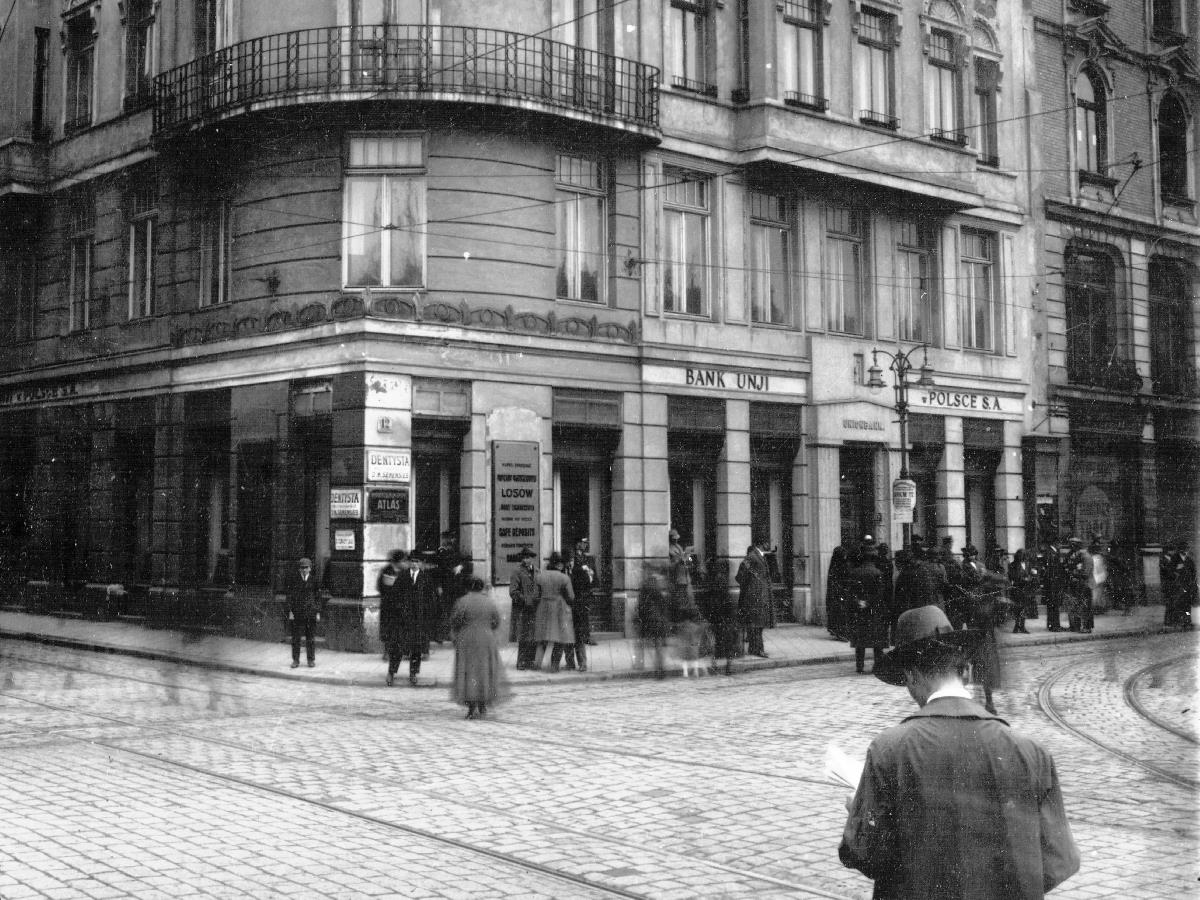
Union Bank building at 3, Berynda Street

In 1901, the Armenian Pious Bank collapsed, with Canon Jan Mordirosevich (also referred to as Mardorosevich) being held responsible. Appointed director in 1890, Mordirosevich abused the trust of Archbishop Isaac Isakovich and the Chapter by spending large sums from the bank's treasury on women, gambling, and various ventures. To cover the shortfall, he began speculating in oil stocks, resulting in a loss of 280,000 crowns, or half of the bank's total capital. When it became impossible to conceal the deficit, Mordirosevich surrendered to the police and was sentenced to 18 months in prison.

In the late 19th and early 20th centuries, remittances from numerous Galician emigrants who had settled in the United States, Canada, Austria-Hungary, the German Empire, and Denmark (totaling about 2 million emigrants who sent around 160 million crowns to Galicia each year) were of great importance to Lviv's financial system. The volume of these remittances was so substantial that it drove up land prices and increased savings in banking institutions, although it undermined mortgage lending. By the beginning of the 20th century, Lviv had developed entire "banking" streets: about 20 banks were located on May 3, 15 banks on Karl Ludwig and Hetmanska, and 7 banks on Kopernik.

The beginning of the 20th century saw the peak of the oil boom, (Note: In 1909, 2.1 million tons of oil were produced in Galicia, which was 5.2% of the world's production.) which was actively supported by major European banks (in 1913, 30% of investments in the region's oil industry were made by Austrian capital, 20% by English capital, and 15% by French capital). In 1902, the Banker's House Jacob Ulya (Note: From the same Jewish family came the Lviv architect Michal Ulam and the famous American mathematician Stanislaw Ulam.) and the Joint Stock Cooperative Bank were founded. The latter was initially located at 7 May 3 Street, then moved in 1911 to 3 Smolka Square, in a building specifically constructed for it (today, this building houses the regional department of the Ministry of Internal Affairs of Ukraine, designed by architect Alfred Zakharevich). (Note: The building was constructed of reinforced concrete and other technical innovations of the time. On the first floor of the bank there was a cafe Warsaw — a popular meeting place for Lviv financiers.) After 1924, it was located at 4 Akademicheskaya Street. In 1903, Lviv saw the establishment of the Trade Bank, located at 24 Akademicheskaya Street, and the Trade and Credit Bank, located at 4 Bernstein Street (now Sholom Aleichem Street). In 1906, the Swiss Schaffhausen Banking Union became a co-owner of the Anglo-Austrian Bank.

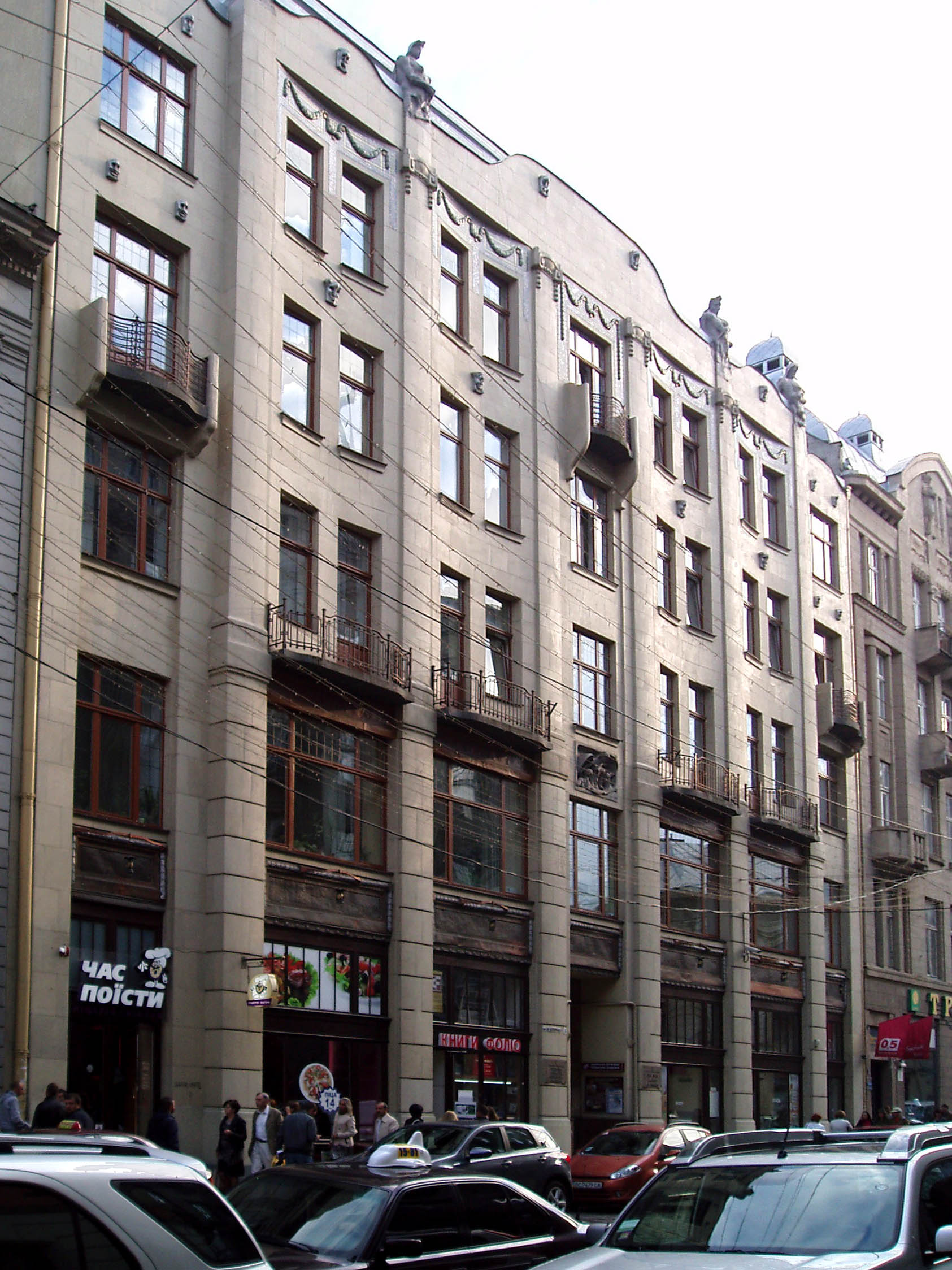
Kopernik Street, 3

In 1909–1910, the banking and insurance business developed actively in Lviv. In 1909, the Galician Merchant Bank was founded (in 1913 it was transformed into a joint-stock company). In the same year, the Austrian bank Niederösterreichische Escompte Gesellschaft became a major co-owner of the Industrial Bank of the Kingdom of Galicia and Lodomeria (share capital — 10 million crowns). In 1910 a representative office of the insurance company Assicurazioni Generali and several new financial institutions were opened: the Galician Zemstvo Credit Bank, the Galician Zemstvo Mortgage Bank (1 million crowns capital), the People's Bank of Agriculture and Trade, the Polish Industrial Bank in Lviv and the Lviv branch of the Industrial Bank of the Principality of Krakow (the modernist building was designed by architect Alfred Zakharevych on the company's order). (Note: During the Soviet period the building housed the Lviv Financial Technical School, and during the Ukrainian period — the Institute of Finance and Economics, the Financial Academy and the Department of Financial Management of Lviv University.)

In 1911, the Vienna Union Bank absorbed the Sokal and Lilien. In 1912, the City Savings Bank was opened in the Lviv City Hall. In 1914, the Galicia Land Credit Partnership became the Credit Partnership of Landowners of Galicia and moved to 4 Copernicus Street. In the same year the Galicia Commercial Bank and a branch of the General Land Bank of Poland were established. Before World War I, some other banks were also operating in Lviv: Land Protection, Construction Bank, Lviv Bank, General Deposit Bank, Union Bank, Prague Credit Bank, among others.

A characteristic feature of multi-ethnic Austria-Hungary was the existence of independent Austrian, Hungarian, Czech, Polish, Jewish, Ukrainian, and other business communities, including banking institutions. These institutions were founded and managed by members of the national financial elite and primarily served their ethnic communities. The main reason for the formation of these national business networks was the numerous barriers that prevented representatives of other ethnic groups from obtaining credit or insurance on favorable terms, as well as the significant role of personal connections in the financial environment of the empire.

The oldest business communities were the Armenian and Jewish, which traditionally controlled the provision of financial services (including petty usury). However, these communities were transnational and not strictly Lviv-based. Later, the Austrian, Hungarian, and Czech business communities gained influence and established their own banks with extensive branch systems. Subsequently, Polish and Ukrainian business communities emerged. Polish banks established close ties between Lviv and Krakow, which became part of the empire. The migration of wealthy Poles from Prussian Greater Poland and especially from the Russian Kingdom of Poland to the more loyal Austrian Galicia increased significantly after the Third Partition of the Polish-Lithuanian Commonwealth and the suppression of the Polish Uprising of 1830–1834.

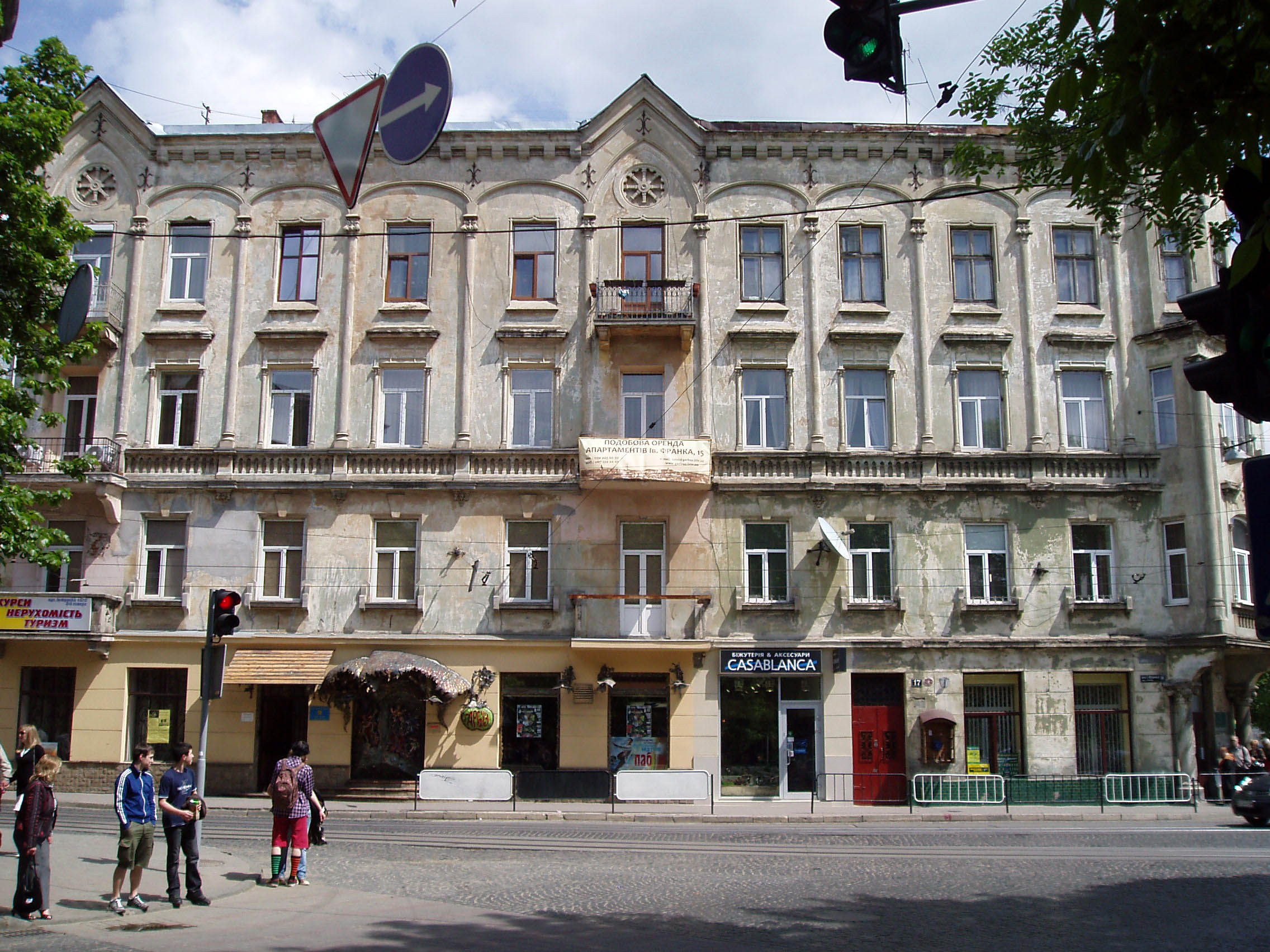
Ivan Franko Street, 15–17

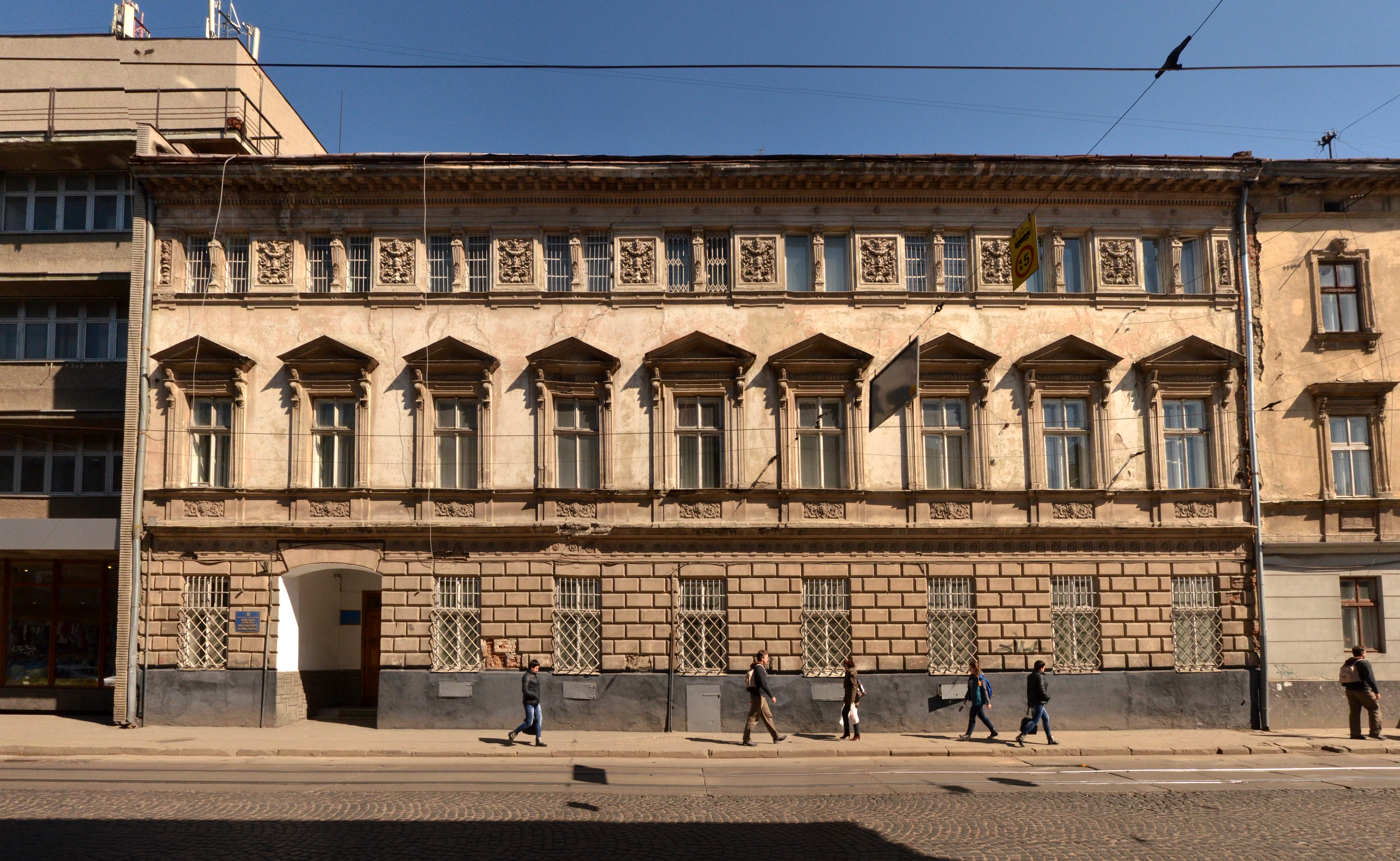
Ivan Franko Street, 25

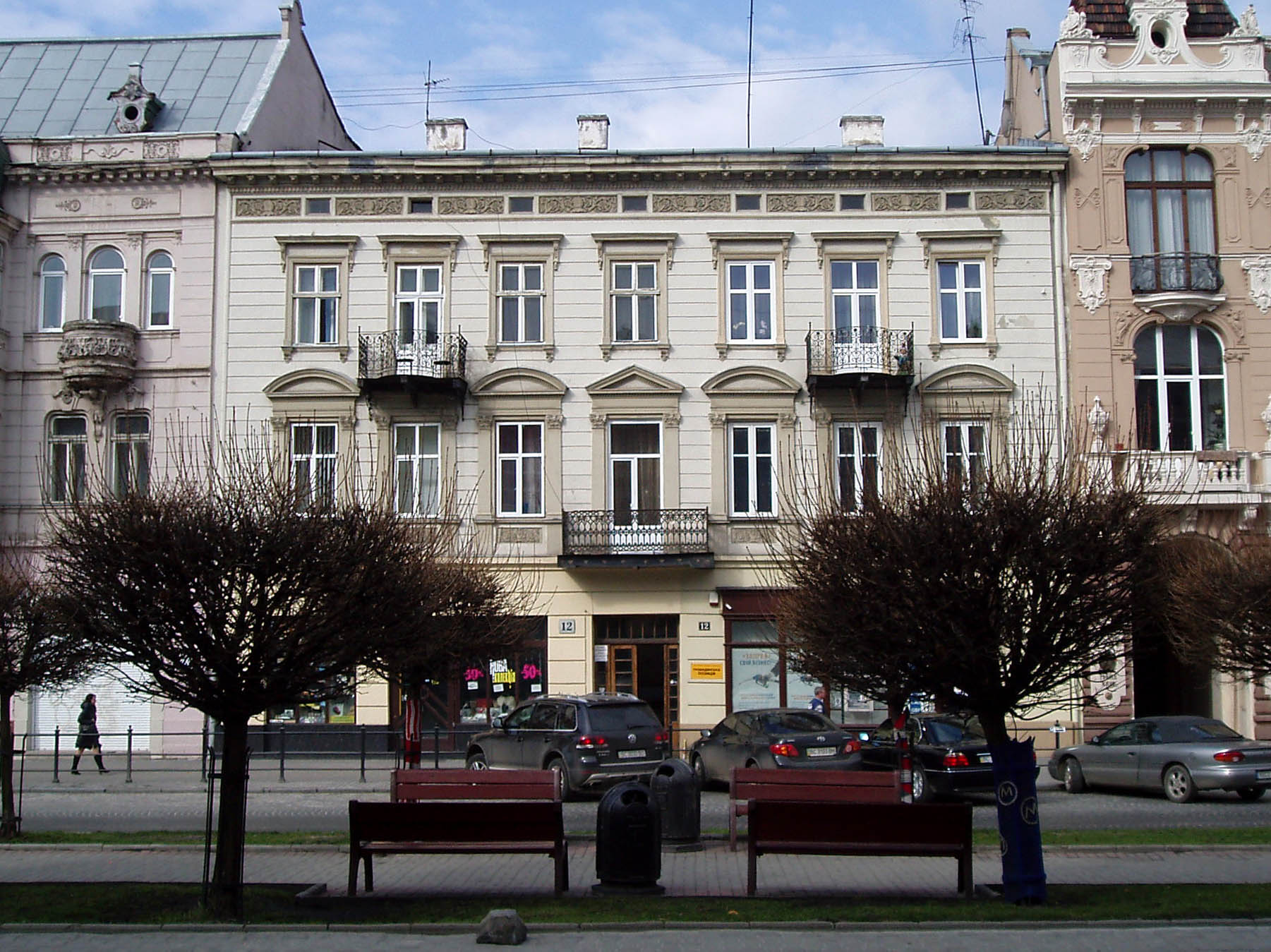
Shevchenko Avenue, 12

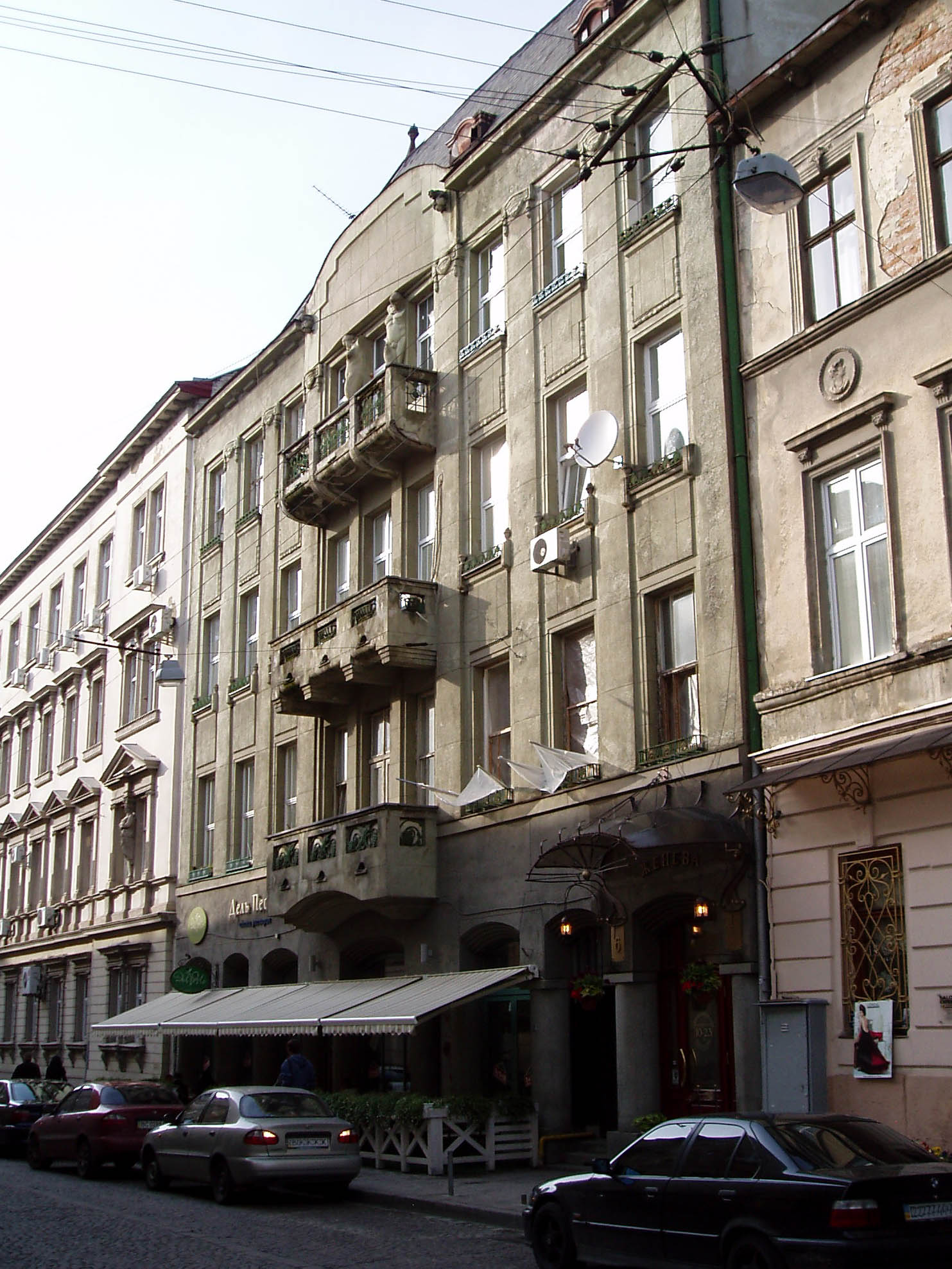
Kostyushko Street, 6

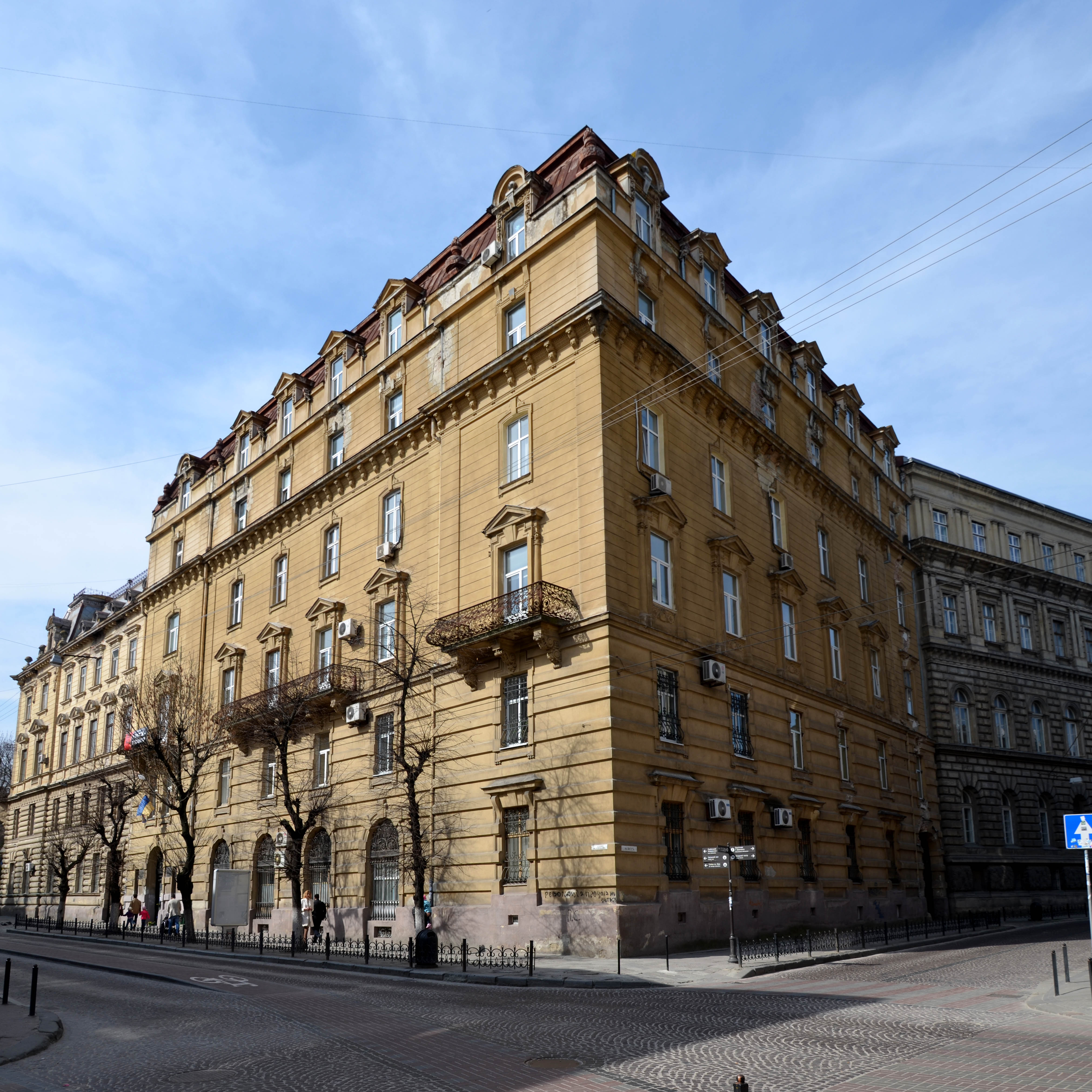
Sechevykh Streltsov Street, 14

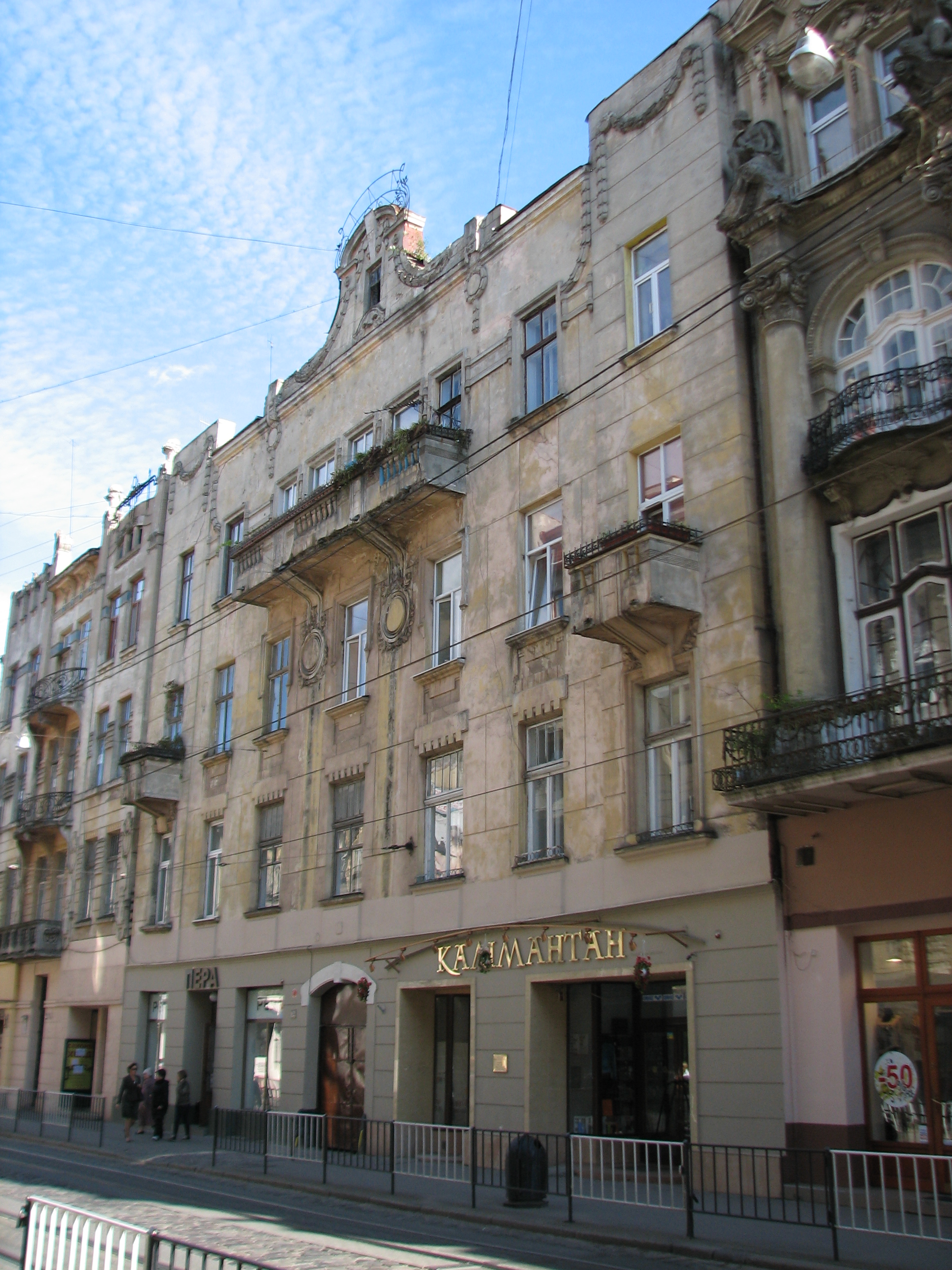
Dorochenko Street, 17

Lvov was dominated by a conservative Polish aristocracy, among the various officials there were many Austrians and Germans besides Poles, and commerce was in the hands of Jews. The Ukrainian middle class was a small and insular community in a state of confrontation with the Polish majority. In banking, the nascent Ukrainian institutions were pressured not only by Polish and Austrian banks, but also by the authorities. For example, the governor of Galicia, Count Alfred Potocki, opposed the creation of Ukrainian financial organizations and repeatedly refused to allow the establishment of savings banks. The consolidation of the Ukrainian middle class was facilitated by the widespread cooperative movement and the activities of the Prosvita company.

Among the shareholders and managers of Galician banks, Austrians and Poles predominated. The Ukrainian (Ruthenian) business community included the Galician Zemsky Mortgage Bank, the Zemsky Mortgage Bank in Lviv (its founder and main shareholder was Metropolitan Andriy Sheptytsky, (Note: Sheptytsky also owned large stakes in the insurance companies Dnestr and Karpatia, the oil companies Unia and Radova, and through an acquaintance of the Dutch lawyer Jan van Hangel, he invested in gold exploration in Sumatra, but the project never materialized.) with other co-founders including Bishop Stanislava Chomichyn and Priest Titus Wojnarowski), and the Dniester Cooperative Bank, which was created by the decision of the insurance company of the same name to profit from accumulated insurance premiums (only those who had previously concluded a contract with the parent insurance company could become members of the bank). The Zemsky Mortgage Bank in Lviv specialized in servicing the Ukrainian Greek Catholic Church and enterprises founded by Ukrainians. The bank also granted loans for 10–50 years to small landowners and peasants who wanted to buy land (the share of such loans was 71% of the portfolio in 1911 and 64% in 1913). Since 1914, the Zemsky Mortgage Bank in Lviv issued more than 1,800 loans amounting to 7 million hryvnia.

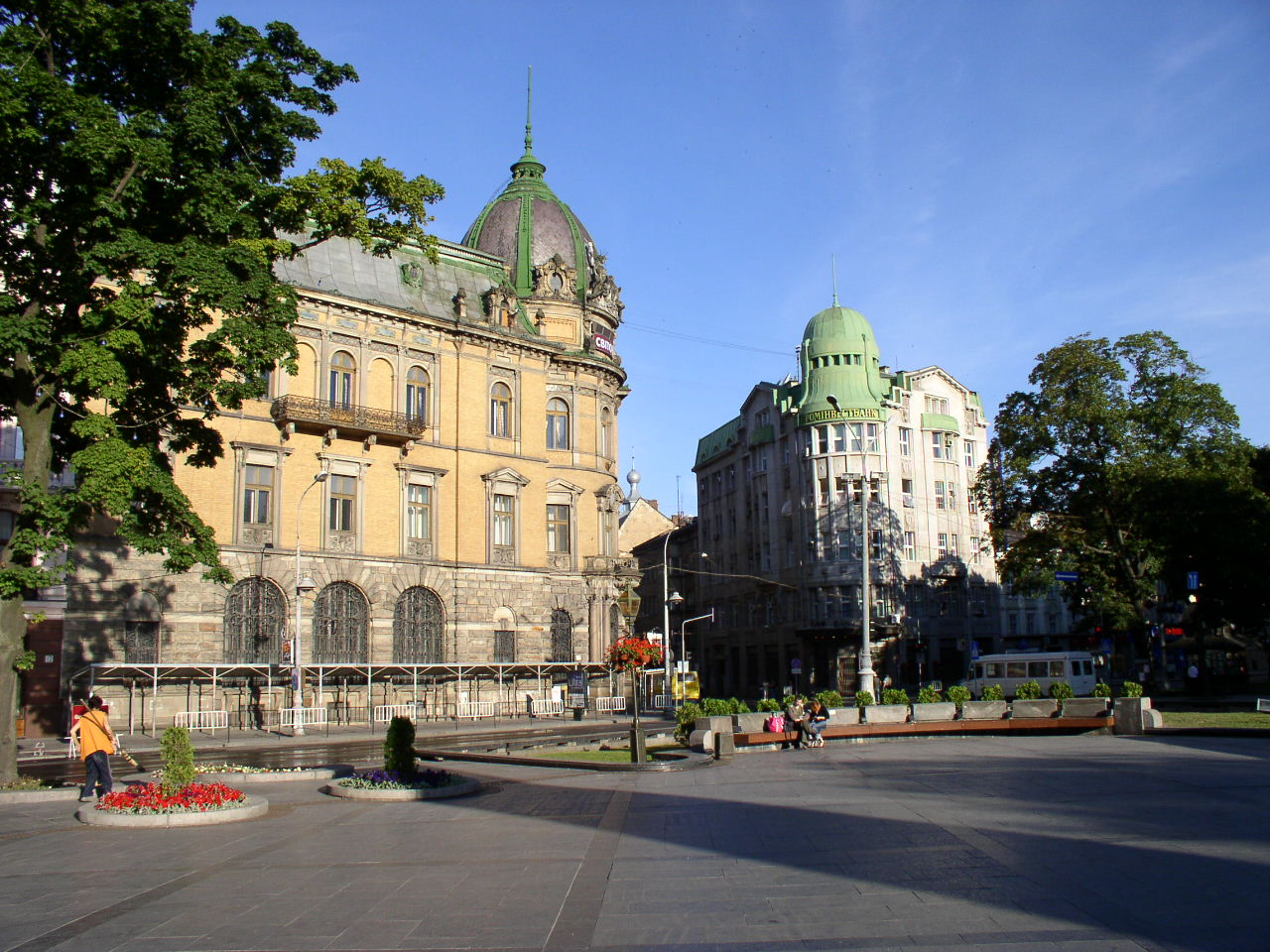
Svoboda Avenue, 15 and 17

The shareholders of the Galician Zemstvo Mortgage Bank included the Galician Credit Bank, as well as a number of landowners, merchants, and industrialists. It was the only large joint-stock bank of the Ukrainian business community. One of the shareholders and managers of the Galician Zemstvo Mortgage Bank was a prominent social and political figure of Galicia, Kost Levitsky. The bank issued mortgages on land and other real estate, lent against securities, traded in government securities, including promissory notes, engaged in money transfers, and handled operations with bank accounts.

In 1908, the Galician Mortgage Bank issued 2,500 shares for a total of 1 million crowns, which were purchased by the Ukrainian population within a few weeks (until then, the Galician market was dominated by securities of Austrian and Polish institutions). By 1913, the Galician Zemstvo Mortgage Bank had issued long-term and short-term loans totaling 12.6 million crowns to secure urban real estate, 3.8 million crowns to secure land owned by large landowners, and 0.8 million crowns to secure peasant land.

Despite the presence of several banks and insurance companies, the Ukrainian business community was primarily based on credit unions and cooperatives, which, however, did not have significant financial resources. These included rural credit cooperatives and kassa, known as Raiffeisen cash offices and Stefchik cash offices. They provided loans to peasants at 10% and quickly ousted private moneylenders from the credit market. Representatives of the Greek Catholic Church also actively participated in the consolidation of the middle class, recommending parishioners to invest their savings only in Ukrainian banks and other financial institutions. In addition, church representatives themselves kept parish funds in the credit cooperatives General Credit Institution for Galicia and Bukovina (founded in 1873), People's Trade (founded in 1883), (Note: In addition to Narodnaya Torgovlya, Lviv architect Vasyl Nagorny participated in the creation of the society of Ukrainian craftsmen, industrialists and merchants Zarya, the insurance company Dnestr and the Galician branch of the sports movement Sokol.) and Rural Host (founded in 1899, which at the peak of its activity had 32,000 members), as well as in the cooperative bank Dniester, Zemsky Mortgage Bank in Lviv, and Galician Zemsky Mortgage Bank. The coordinator and initiator of many credit unions and cooperatives was the Prosvita society, which led the Ukrainian national movement in Galicia.

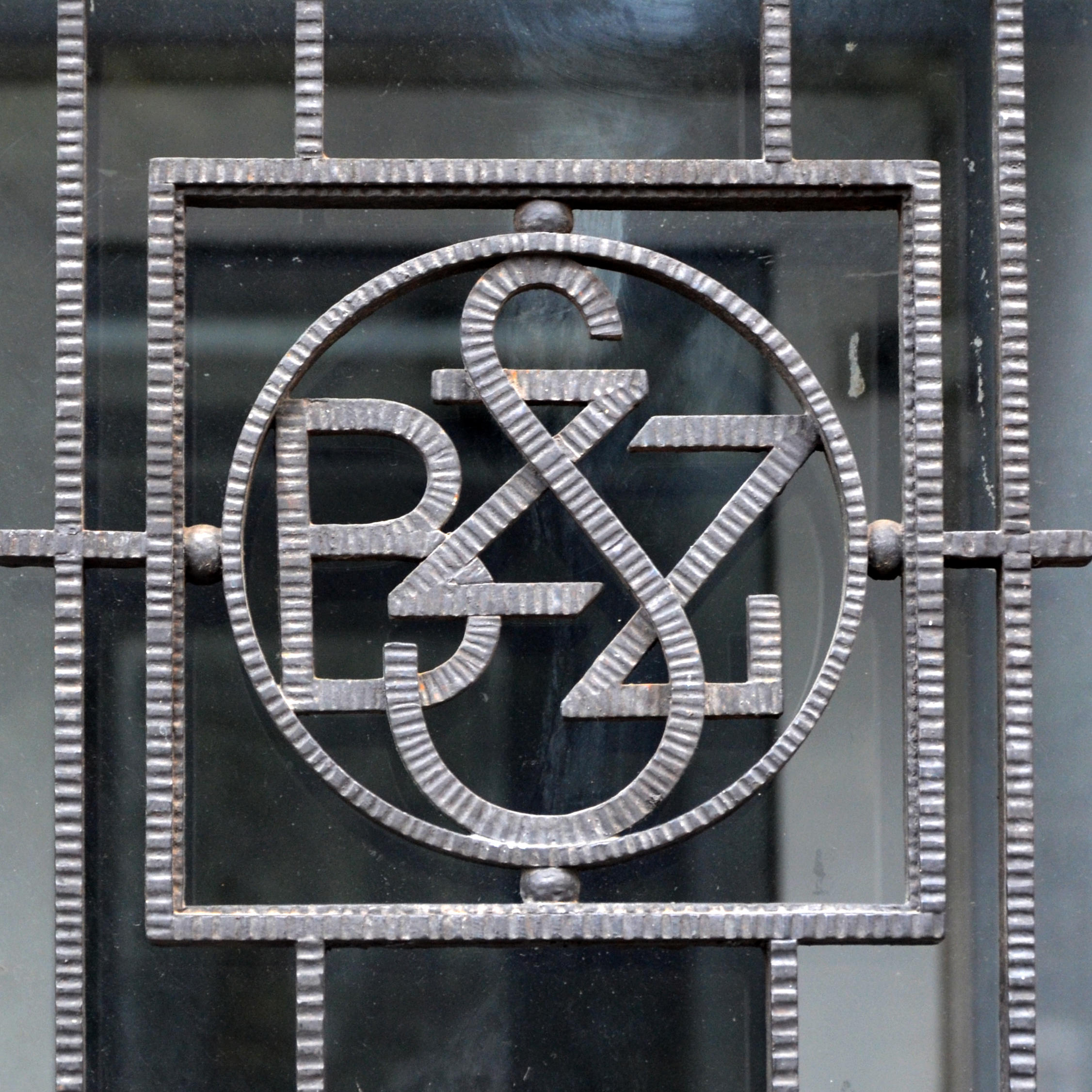
The Bank Związku Spółek Zarobkowych logo on the grille of the building. Galicia Square, 7

In 1894, the famous lawyer Theophilus Kormosh founded the Ukrainian credit cooperative Vera, which served mainly the urban middle class (the model of Vera was soon followed by the cooperative bank Dniester). In 1896, the Union of Zadatkovy Partnerships was established to supervise the work of non-bank credit organizations in Galicia. It was later renamed the Regional Credit Union, which united all Ukrainian credit cooperatives (its activities were financed by the Galician Zemsky Mortgage Bank). In December 1903, by the decision of the board of directors, it was renamed the Krai Revision Union, which was engaged in audit and control, as well as publishing a specialized magazine, Economis.

From the moment of its establishment until the early 1940s, Kost Levitsky was the head of the Krai Revision Union. The union, which had about 400 members, not only inspected credit institutions but also provided them with financial assistance if necessary to stabilize their situation. By 1912, Galicia had more than 2,900 credit unions of all types, over 1,500 credit cooperatives, 27 rural and 24 urban savings banks, including 428 Ukrainian credit unions with a total capital of 8.4 million crowns (from 1898 to 1913, the total number of credit cooperatives grew 16 times, and their capital 58 times).

Savings banks in Lviv not only invested free capital in various securities but also provided short-term loans secured by real estate and movable property (mainly houses, land, and jewelry). The largest were the Galician Postal Savings Bank, Central Savings Bank, and City Municipal Savings Bank. The total amount of deposits in savings banks grew from 187 million crowns in 1900 to 324 million crowns in 1912 (accounting for almost a third of all deposits in Galicia's financial institutions, which reached 1 billion crowns).

Since the beginning of the 20th century until the First World War, oil production in Galicia acquired mass character, and the industry was dominated by large joint-stock companies with foreign capital. Initially, the oil industry in the region was dominated by Austrian capital, which, due to the lack of external colonies in Austria-Hungary, moved to the periphery of the empire. Among the largest Austrian investors was the Viennese bank Creditanstalt, a member of the Rothschild financial group.

German, French, British, American (including John Rockefeller's company), and Polish capital was also present in the industry. Prague banks also invested in the oil industry—Merchant Bank for Bohemia and Moravia, Prague Credit Bank, and Zivnobank (the first was a co-founder of the Galician Mining Joint Stock Company based in Lviv). In 1903, on the initiative of Creditanstalt Bank, the Petrolea Syndicate was created, which united the largest oil companies, but during the overproduction crisis of 1907, when oil prices fell, the syndicate broke up.

In addition to the oil industry, Czech banks actively provided municipal loans to small towns in Galicia, worked with the population (the most extensive branch network was that of the Czech savings bank Sporobank), and invested in railroads and sugar production (for example, the Merchant Bank for Bohemia and Moravia was a co-owner of the Galicia Joint Stock Company of Sugar Industry, and Zivnobank owned securities of railroads in Galicia).

Shortly before World War I, Lviv's financial system was on the rise. For example, the fixed capital of the Galician Joint Stock Mortgage Bank grew to 20 million crowns, the reserve capital to 9 million crowns, the volume of loans in 1914 amounted to 207 million crowns, and the annual dividends for the bank's shareholders were at the level of 5-10%.

The largest bank was the State Regional Bank of the Kingdom of Galicia and Lodomeria, founded to reduce the cost of mortgage lending and to intensify agrarian reform (in addition, the bank actively lent to municipalities and rural communities). Initially designed for small peasant farms, in practice, large borrowers prevailed among the bank's clients (the share of loans over 20,000 crowns amounted to 76% of the total portfolio). Under the control of the Galicia Regional Sejm, which appointed the members of the bank's board, the capital of the financial institution grew from 2 million crowns in 1881 to 15 million crowns in 1907 (by this indicator, it became the leader among the banks in Galicia). As of 1913, the State Regional Bank owned 30% of all banking capital in Galicia, 33% of short-term loans, 60% of mortgages, and 70% of all deposits.

Leaders involved in the development of Lviv's banking system

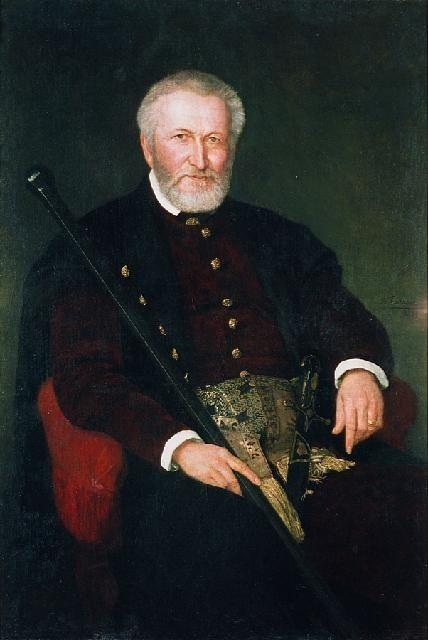
Leon Sapieha

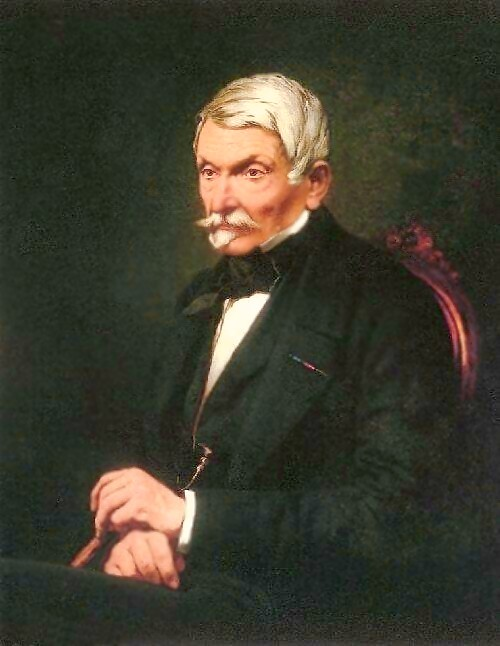
Aleksander Fredro

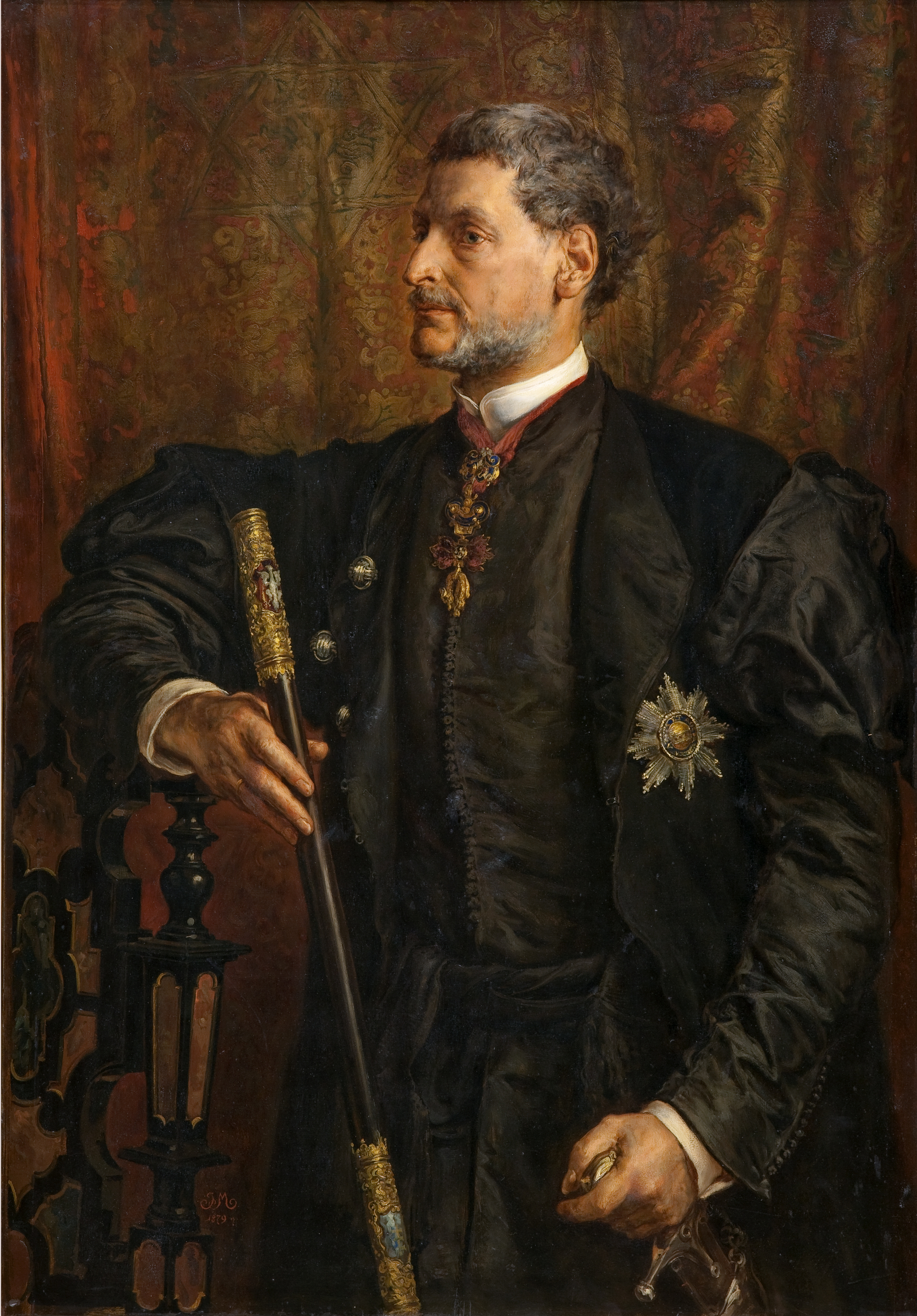
Alfred Józef Potocki

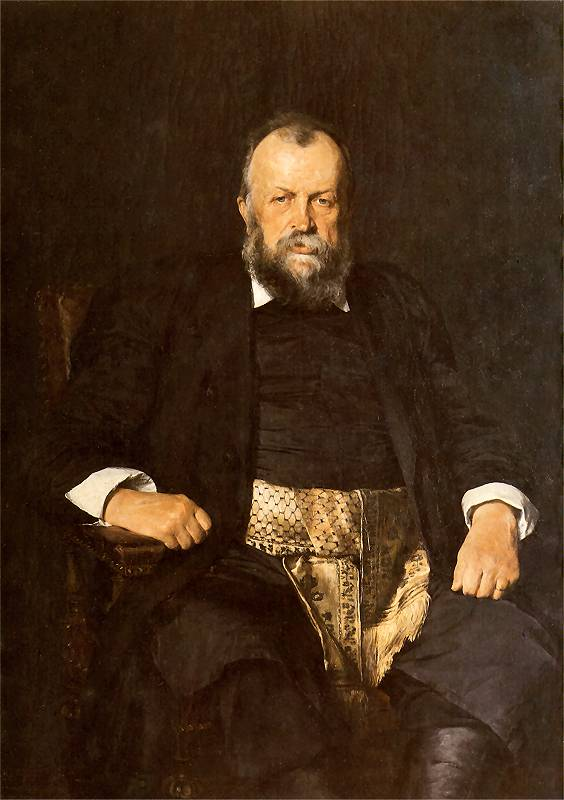
Vladimir Dzeduszyckiy

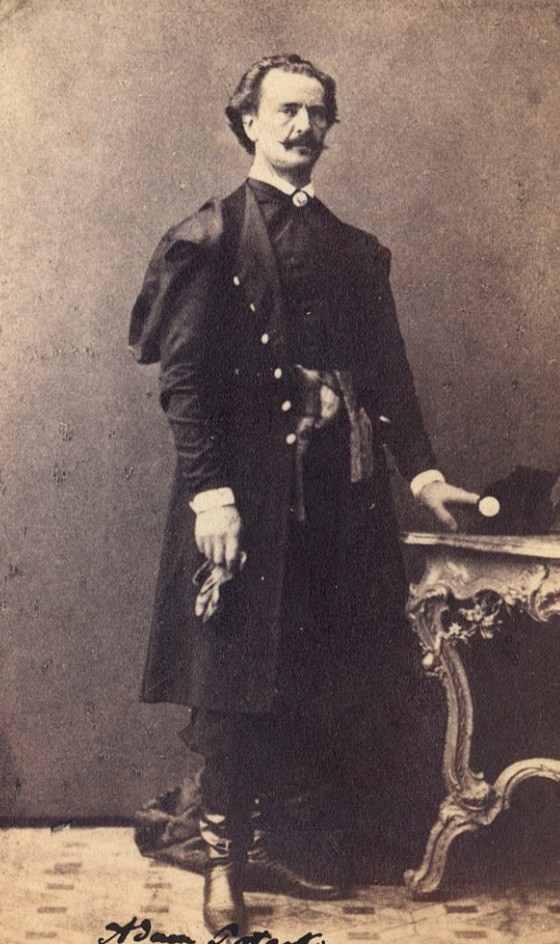
Adam Potocki

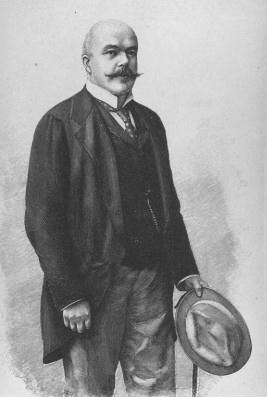
Kasimir Badeni

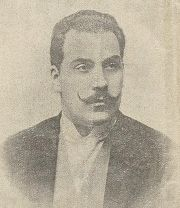
Waclaw Zaleski

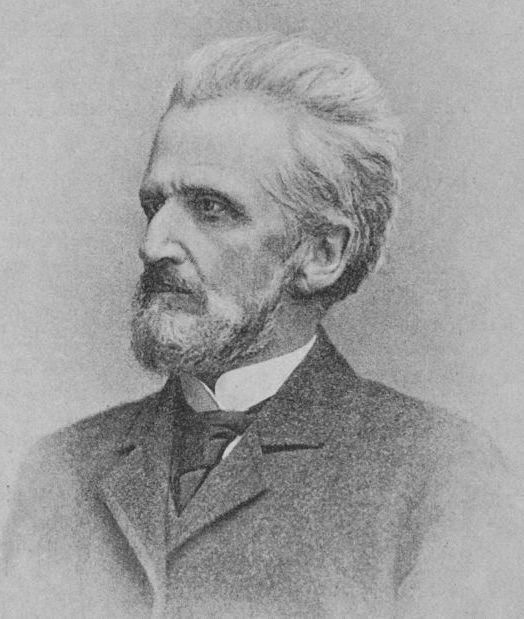
Adam Sapieha

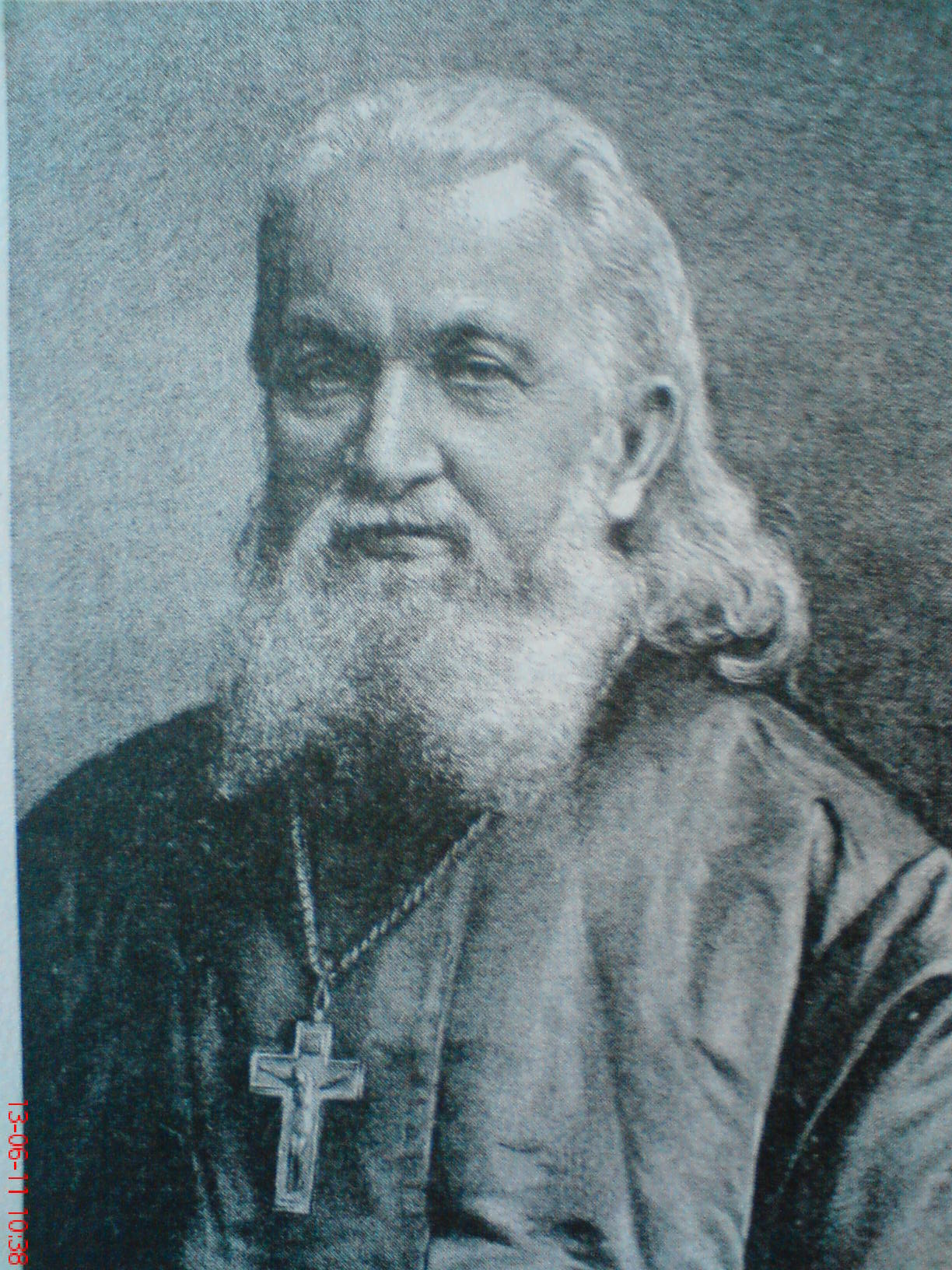
Ivan Naumovich

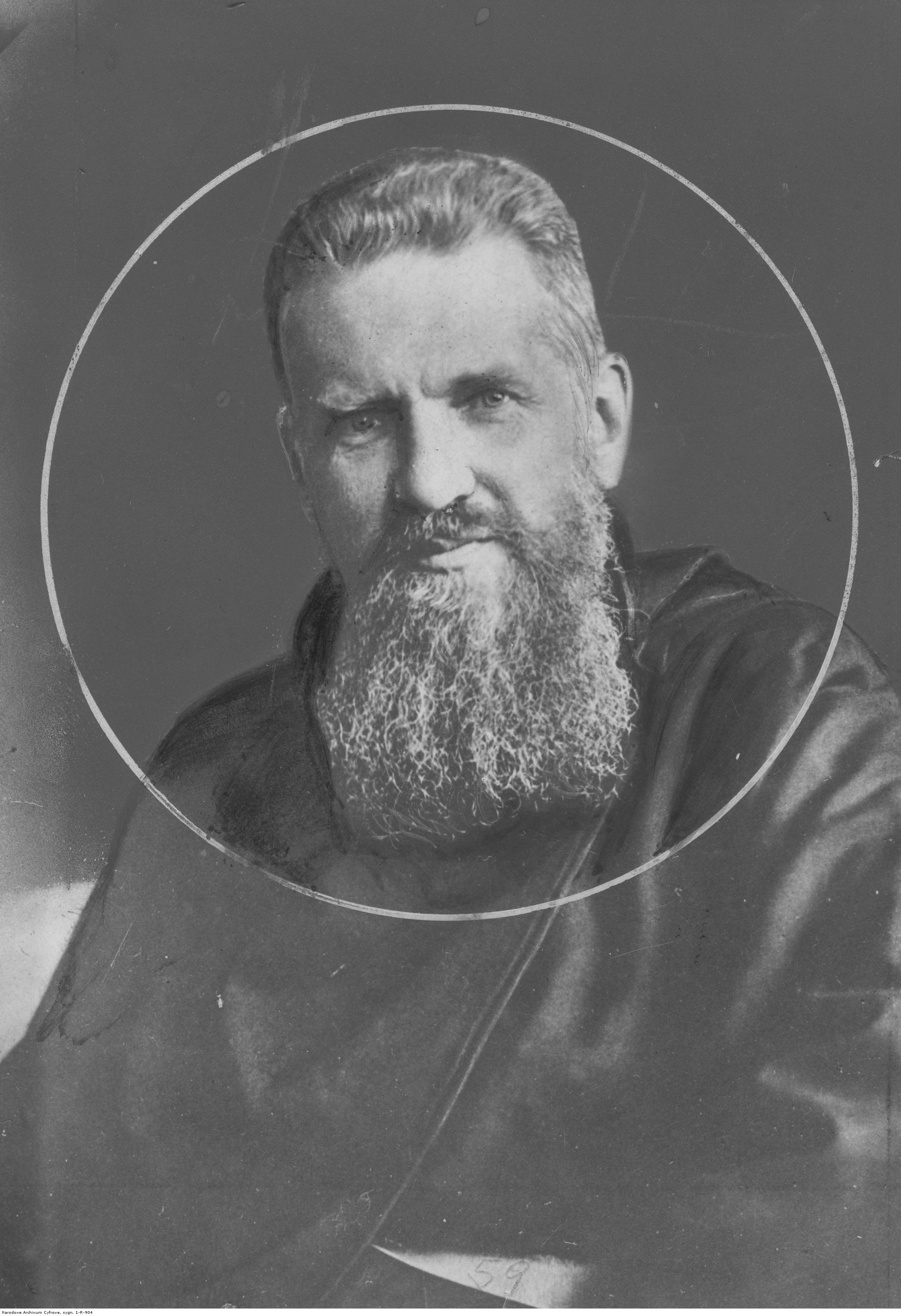
Andrey Sheptytsky

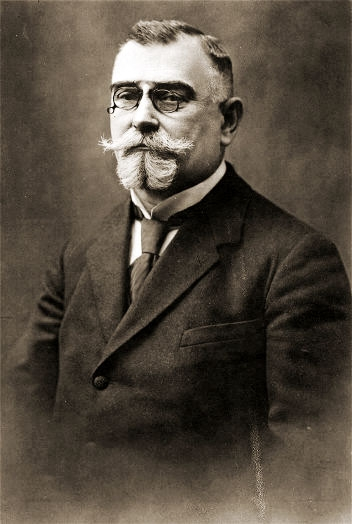
Kost Levytsky

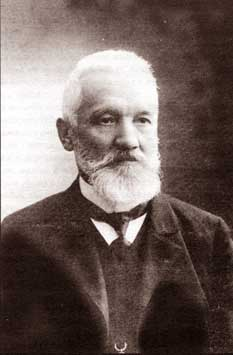
Vasily Nagorny

=== Stock market ===
The Galicia stock market was formed after the region joined the Habsburg Monarchy. Initially, the Viennese City Bank's banknotes (bancocettels) bonds appeared in Lviv, but gradually their credibility began to decline, ultimately destabilizing the empire's financial system. War loan bonds issued by the Ministry of Finance for the Napoleonic Wars and “silver rents” were also in circulation. In March 1811, the Austrian treasury defaulted and devalued the bancocettels.

The National Bank of Austria was founded in 1816 by the initiative of Count Johann von Stadion to remove depreciated banknotes from circulation and exchange them for new money. The new financial institution issued shares, which also circulated in Lviv, redeemed war loan bonds, and minted new coins, eventually normalizing money circulation. In 1848, serfdom was abolished in the Austrian Empire, and starting in 1853, Galician landowners began receiving redemption compensation, issued through indemnity bonds with annual repayment.

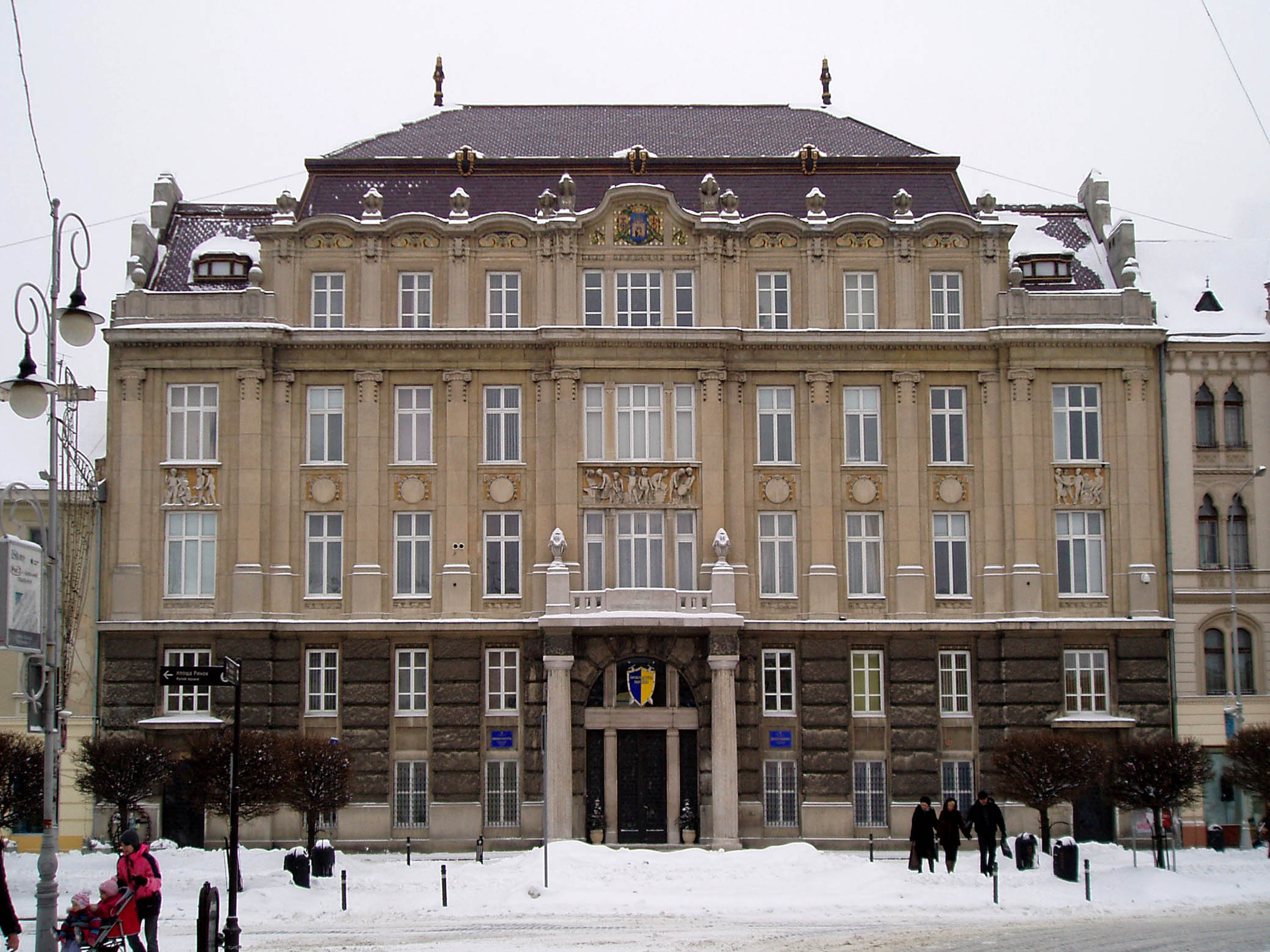
Shevchenko Avenue, 17. Former building of the Chamber of Commerce and Industry, where the stock exchange operated.

In 1854, indemnity bonds worth 20.3 million guilders were in circulation in Galicia (for comparison, the volume of mortgage-backed securities during the same period amounted to 12 million guilders). These Galician indemnization bonds were actively traded on the Vienna Stock Exchange. Mortgage bonds from mortgage banks were the second most popular, with their main issues taking place between 1843 and 1870. In the second half of the 19th century, bonds from railroads, steamship companies, banks, and military loans were also actively traded in Lviv. The Galician Regional Sejm used railroad bonds as collateral for loans from banks. Most of the bonds in circulation in Lviv were Austrian, though some were Polish, Hungarian, and even foreign (Dutch, Swiss, Serbian, and Turkish). The Galician Joint-Stock Mortgage Bank issued not only mortgage certificates but also "regional" bonds.

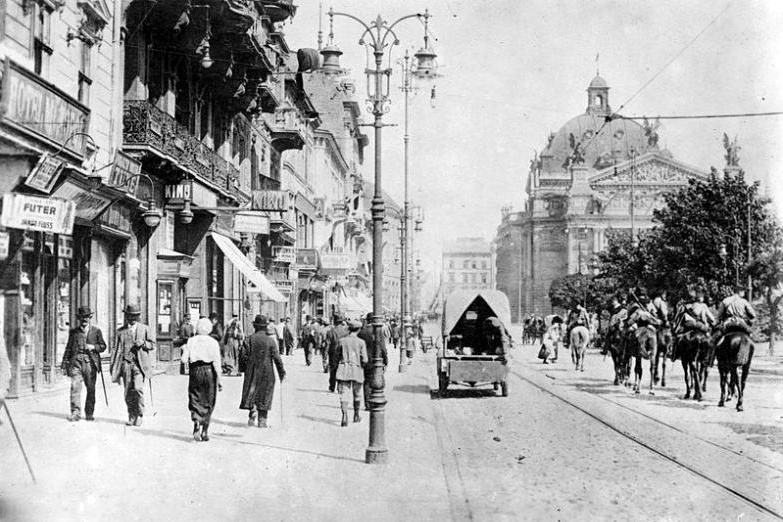
Svoboda Avenuein the beginning of the 20th century

Several railway and oil companies in Galicia were listed on the Vienna and London stock exchanges, with their primary investors being English and Belgian buyers, along with German and Austrian banks, such as Darmstadt Bank. Among the issuers of securities within the Ukrainian business community, the most notable were the Galician Zemstvo Mortgage Bank and the societies Prosvita and Zarya (the latter issued interest-free "debt certificates"). Before World War I, the Galician stock market was dominated by government bonds and mortgages, while the equity market was rather underdeveloped, with shares being traded mostly in Polish banks and occasionally in oil companies. The general population held a significant number of securities, including bonds and bills of various types, as well as lottery tickets and insurance policies, which were common among middle-income families. In 1913, per capita securities in Galicia amounted to 25 dollars (compared to 95 dollars in Austria-Hungary and 39 dollars in the Russian Empire).

In 1850, the Chamber of Commerce and Industry was established in Lviv, which later initiated the creation of the Lviv Stock Exchange in 1868. The legalization of securities trading was driven by the fact that nearly all operations with Galician indemnity bonds and mortgage papers had been monopolized by the "black stock exchange," located on the Hetman's Walls. The main volume of quotations on the Lviv exchange consisted of mortgage bonds from local banks, indemnification bonds, bonds and shares of railroads and banks in Galicia, as well as bonds from municipal loans in Lviv and Krakow. However, securities transactions were irregular and of secondary importance, with the exchange being predominantly commodity-based. Securities rates were published in the Gazeta Lwowska.

In 1912, the Chamber of Commerce and Industry and the Lviv Stock Exchange moved to a specially constructed building at 17 Akademicheskaya Street (now Shevchenko Avenue). The monumental neoclassical building was designed by architects Jozef Sosnowski and Alfred Zacharewicz. During the Soviet period, it housed the Communist Party's City Committee, and in the Ukrainian period, it became the Lviv Regional Prosecutor's Office. As for the “black stock exchange,” which specialized in speculation with securities, predatory loans, and currency transactions, its peak activity occurred before World War I. Dealers of the “black exchange,” operating around the Archangel Michael monument and in nearby coffee houses (Imperial, Carlton, Grand, Vienna Café), often obtained news before it reached official authorities or bank managers.

== The World War I and the second Polish period ==
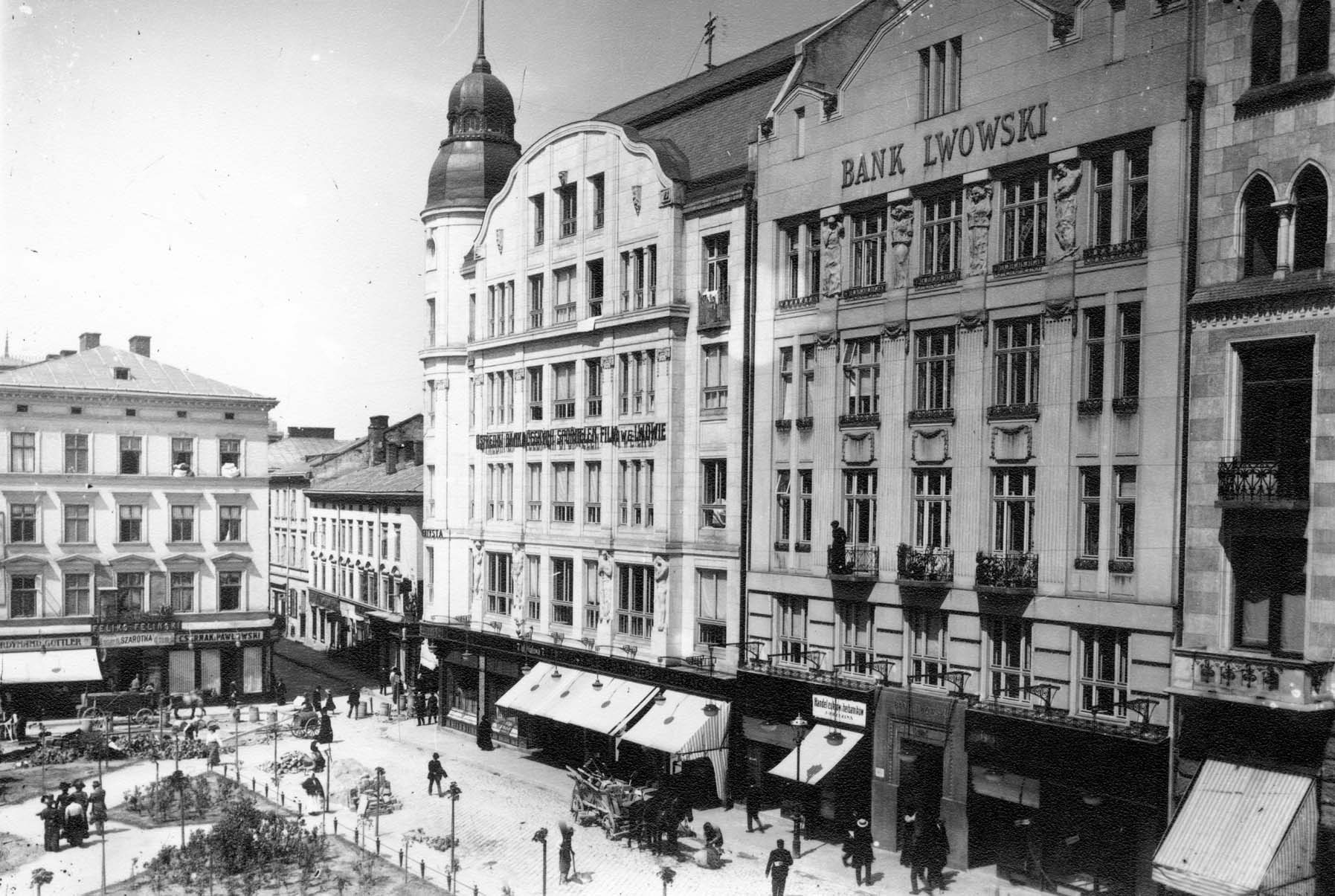
The Lviv Bank building, Valova Street, 9

The First World War severely impacted Lviv's financial sector, with many banks and companies suffering heavy losses due to the devaluation of the Austrian crown. During the Russian occupation of Lviv (September 1914 – June 1915), several banks continued operations: Aktsionerny Kooperatyvny Bank (Smolki Square, 3), Potrebitelsky Bank (Yagellonskaya St., 8), Zemelny Bank (Yagellonskaya St., 25), Narodny Bank Promyshlennosti i Kommertsii (Sikstuska St., 17), Commercial Bank (Kopernik St., 3), Lviv Bank (Valovaya St., 9), Zashchita Zemli Bank (Armenian St., 3), Dniester Bank (Russkaya St., 20), and Meshchansky Credit Union (Market Square, 10).

In 1915, the State Regional Bank established the Galician Military Credit Institution to fund job creation and reconstruction projects. After World War I (1918) and the defeat of the West Ukrainian People's Republic by Poland, Galician oil lost its former significance, leading to a partial outflow of financial capital from Lviv. The post-war financial crisis hindered the swift recovery of Lviv's banking sector. Many old banks did not survive the war and the dissolution of Austria-Hungary, others were forced to merge or shift their activities. Austrian and German capital was replaced by Belgian and French investors, while local credit institutions grew rapidly.

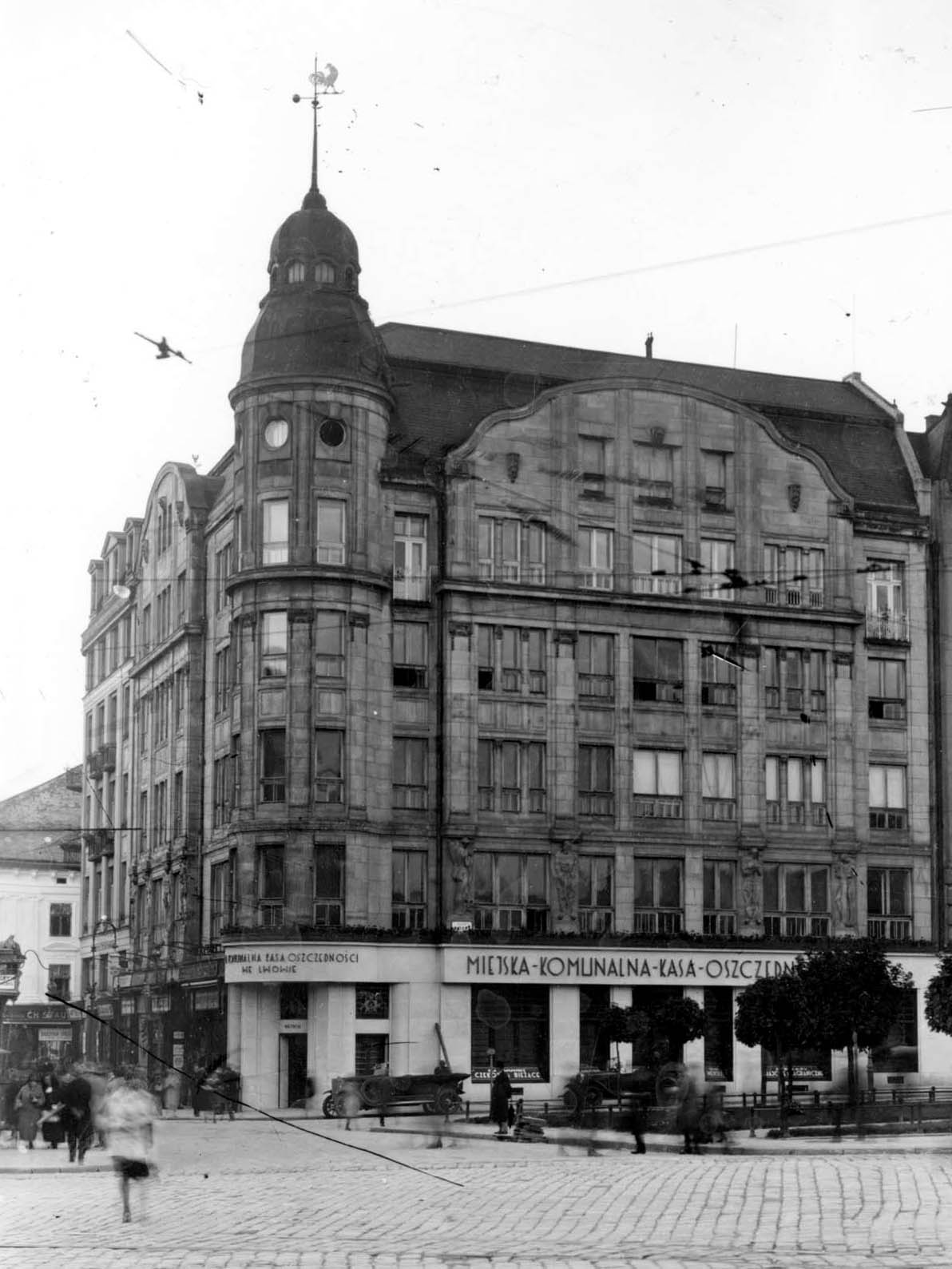
The building of the City Municipal Savings Bank on the corner of Galitskaya and Valovaya Streets

In 1919, the Agricultural-Industrial Bank, a Lviv joint-stock bank, began operating. In the same year, the Prague Credit Bank and the Prague Agrarian Bank became major shareholders of the Galician Zemstvo Mortgage Bank. By 1920, there were 40 joint-stock banks in Galicia, of which 35 were located in Lviv. Due to the hyperinflation of the Polish marka in the early 1920s, many banks lost capital. However, after the stabilization of the zloty in 1924, the financial situation improved. For example, in 1930, the annual balance of the Armenian Pious Bank amounted to nearly 290 thousand zlotys. Since 1924, the Ukrainian Provincial Credit Union functioned as the Central Provincial Bank and was housed in the Lubomirski Palace. In the same year, the Galician Merchant Bank was reorganized into the Bank of Polish Merchants, with an office in Lviv at Kopernik Street, 3. The City Municipal Savings Bank also relocated to Valova Street, 7 (this modernist house was designed by architects Alfred Zacharewicz and Jozef Sosnowski). (Note: In 1909-1911, Alfred Zakharevich built an ensemble of two buildings on Valovaya Street. The house 7 was built for an insurance company by order of Theodor Balaban, and the neighboring house 9 was built for the Lviv Bank. Today the first floors of both buildings are occupied by Oschadbank.)

Apart from these institutions, during the Second Polish-Lithuanian Commonwealth period in Lviv, there were several other notable banks. The Discount Bank was founded in 1919 at Hetmanska 10, and the Industrial Bank was established in 1920, initially located at 3 May 15 and later moved to 3 May 9. The Bank of Polish Land was located at Batory 12, and the Poznan Sugar Industry Bank, founded in 1922 at Jagiellonska 1, moved in 1930 to Akademicheska 7. Other significant banks included the Polish Trade Bank at Galitska 19, the Merchant Malopolska Bank at Hetmanska 8 (which moved in 1930 to Valovaya 5), and the Prague Guarantee Bank at Zyblikevicha 12. Additionally, the State Land Bank was situated at 25 Pilsudski Street, and the Warsaw Trade Bank was at 10 Hetmanska Street. The Warsaw Discount Bank operated at 14 May 3rd Street, while the Polish Bank was located at Mickiewicz Street, 8. The Central Cooperative Bank was housed in the Hausmann Passage, 7. The Cooperative Bank for Small Trade was at 27 Legions Street, and the Dnestr Bank was situated at Russkaya Street, 20. Additionally, the Postal Savings Bank was located at May 3rd Street, 8.

In 1933, the Dniester Bank had more than 10,000 members. Its own funds amounted to 968,000 PLN, working capital exceeded 3.6 million PLN, and loans totaled over 3 million PLN. In 1935, Polish authorities restricted the activities of Ukrainian financial institutions, depriving Dniester of its license to insure houses against fire. In the 1930s, the share capital of the Galician Zemstvo Mortgage Bank was about 5 million PLN. At the beginning of 1939, the Central Bank had almost 1,900 members, including 113 Ukrainian banking institutions, and working capital of 70 million PLN. Since 1935, the Cooperative Industrial Bank (Prombank) operated in Lwów, financing various industrial and commercial enterprises. At the beginning of 1939, Prombank's capital amounted to 627,000 PLN. Among the smaller financial institutions, the Povetnoe Kreditnoe Tovarishchestvo (Sikstuska, 38), the Mieszczanski Kreditowy Sojuz (Russkaya, 3), and the Narodna Torgovlya cooperative (Rynok Square, 38) were active.

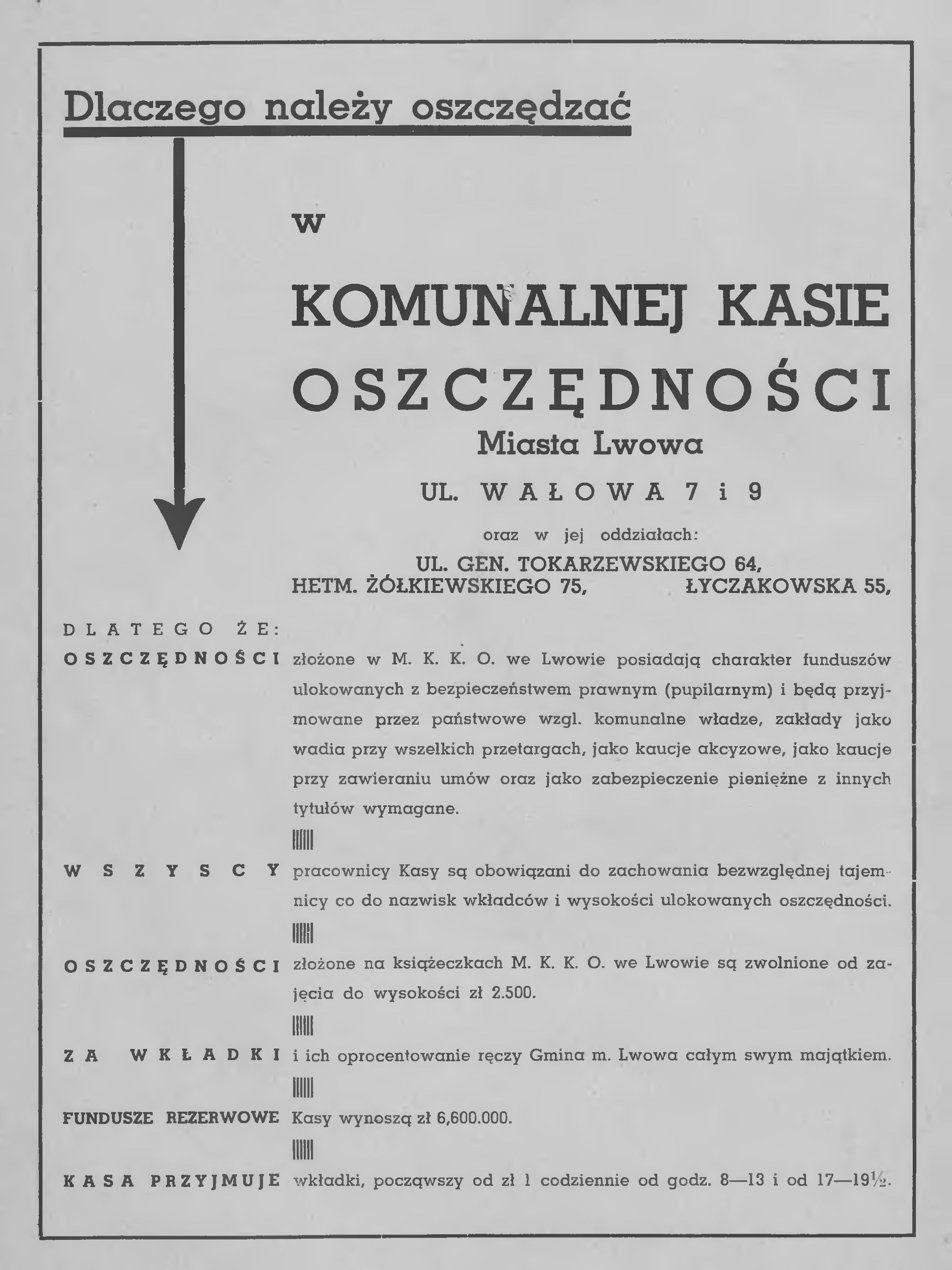
Communal Savings Bank advertisement, 1939

In the 1920s and 1930s, Jewish financiers in Lviv, many of whom had studied in Vienna, Budapest, Berlin, and Trieste, and honed their skills in Europe's largest banks, wielded significant influence in the city's banking sector. Nearly all the Jewish bankers were members of the public organization Leopolis B'nai B'rith, a branch of the global B'nai B'rith network, and were involved in charitable activities. Many supported various Jewish initiatives in British Palestine through Keren ha-Yesod and other foundations. Notable figures included Emil Grabscheid, director of the General Credit Bank, president of the Malopolskie Union of Banks, a member of the Council of the Union of Banks of Poland, vice-president of the Lviv Stock Exchange, and a founder of the Banking Gazette; Bernard Ziff, director of the Lviv branch of the Warsaw Trade Bank, vice-president of the Lviv Merchant Society, and president of the Society of Jewish Labor Intellectuals; Herman Horowitz, director of the Joint Stock Mortgage Bank; and Mauritius Bergner, director of the Lviv branch of the Lodz Discount Bank. Gustav Weintraub, who had extensive experience with Rothschild banking institutions, headed the Lviv branch of the Warsaw Discount Bank. Another director at the same bank was Jozef Halperin, a former captain in the Austrian army. Jakub Zach served as director of the Lviv Banking Society and was a board member of the Union of Poles of the Jewish Faith. Marzelius Friedman, who successfully led the Lviv branch of the Riunione Adriatica di Sicurtà, later oversaw the insurance company's operations across Poland.

== The World War II and the Soviet period ==
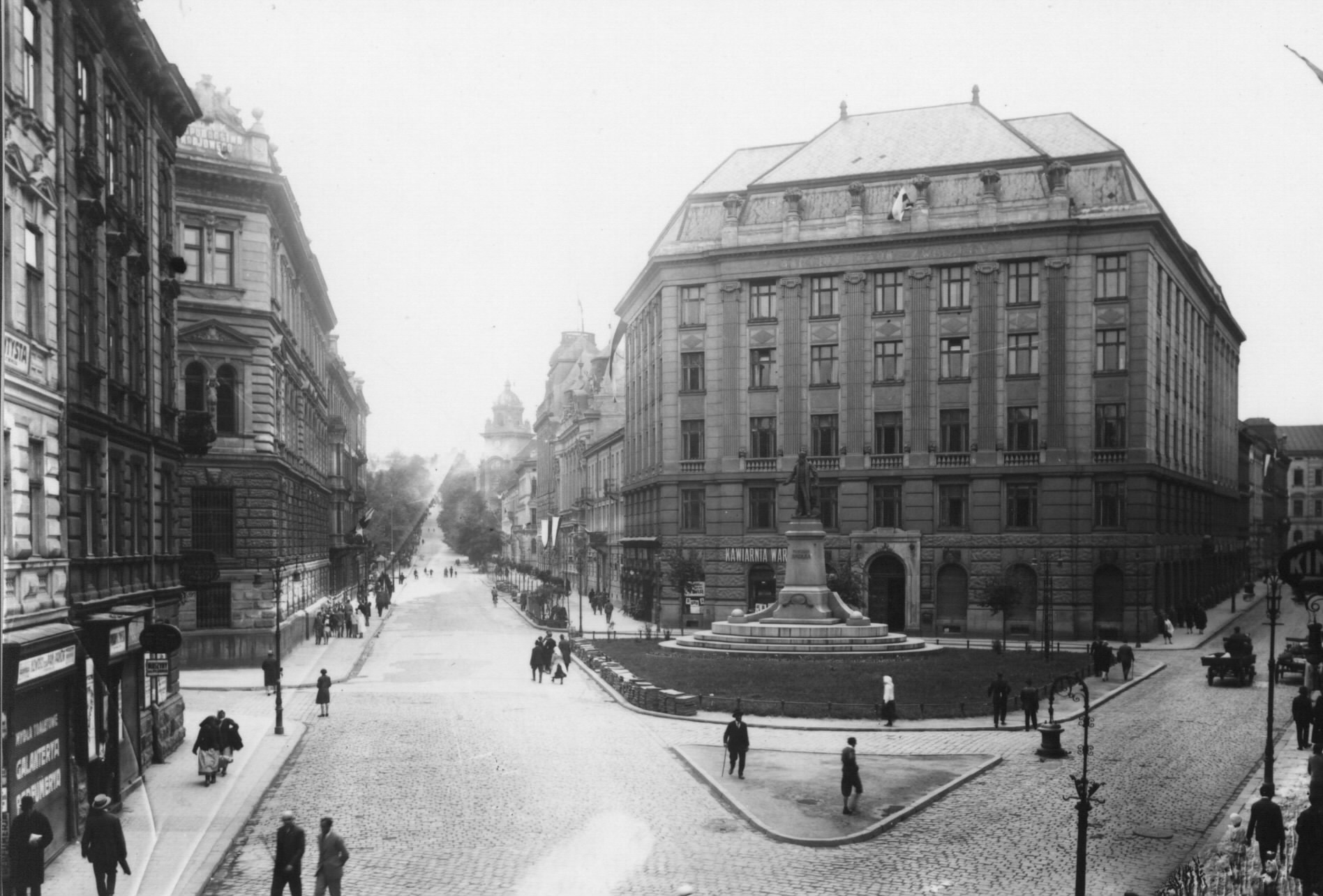
The building of the former Joint Stock Cooperative Bank, occupied during the Soviet period by the Ministry of Internal Affairs

In September 1939, following the outbreak of World War II, valuables from Poznan's Mons Pius Bank were transferred to Lviv's Armenian Pious Bank. These valuables, which included gold bars, jewelry, and diamonds, were partly hidden by the Poznan bankers in the Armenian bank and the rest in a Dominican monastery. During the Fifth Partition of Poland, the Red Army occupied Lviv. The Soviet authorities nationalized or liquidated all banks, expropriated their assets (including buildings), and closed the stock exchange. Once Polish underground structures were established in the city, Adam Bogdanovich, the canon of the Armenian Chapter who had custody of the Poznan valuables, handed them over to the partisans. The gold was sold in small portions on the black market, with the proceeds used to support the underground.

In March 1940, the NKVD began arrests within the Polish underground and soon discovered the Poznan valuables. Those involved with the gold, including Adam Bogdanovich and Kvapinski, the director of the Armenian Pious Bank, were captured. After enduring torture, they revealed the location of the remaining valuables and were subsequently executed. From June 1941 to July 1944, Lviv was occupied by Nazi troops and served as the administrative center of the Galicia district. During this period, branches of Berlin-based Deutsche Bank and Vienna-based Creditanstalt operated in the city. According to various documents, these banks were indirectly involved in the Holocaust, including facilitating financial transactions for concentration camp prisoners, managing accounts for companies using slave labor, and insuring equipment and buildings of labor camps.

Most of the money and jewelry seized from the Jews was transferred to the Reichsbank, with some funds also deposited by the Nazis into accounts at the Krakow Kommerzialbank, which was controlled by the German Dresdner Bank. The building of the Joint Stock Cooperative Bank at 3 Smolka Square was repurposed to house the German Criminal Police Department. In 1945, the main regional office of the State Bank of the USSR was located at Copernicus Street, 4 with the adjacent street renamed Bankovskaya. During the Soviet period, savings banks were widely represented in Lviv, along with specialized institutions such as Selkhozbank, Stroybank, and Vneshtorgbank. After the 1987 reform, representative offices of Sberbank, Promstroybank, Agroprombank, Zhilsotsbank, and Vnesheconombank also operated in the city. Savings banks played an active role in the Soviet monetary reforms of 1947 and 1961 and distributed state loan bonds. In 1963, all savings banks were transferred from the Ministry of Finance of the USSR to the structure of Gosbank, became fully self-sufficient in 1972, and were transformed into Sberbank institutions in 1988. Starting in 1989–1990, Lviv saw an intensive establishment of commercial banks of various ownership forms, including early examples such as Karpaty, Dnestr, West Ukrainian Commercial Bank, and Lviv.

== The period of Ukraine's independence ==
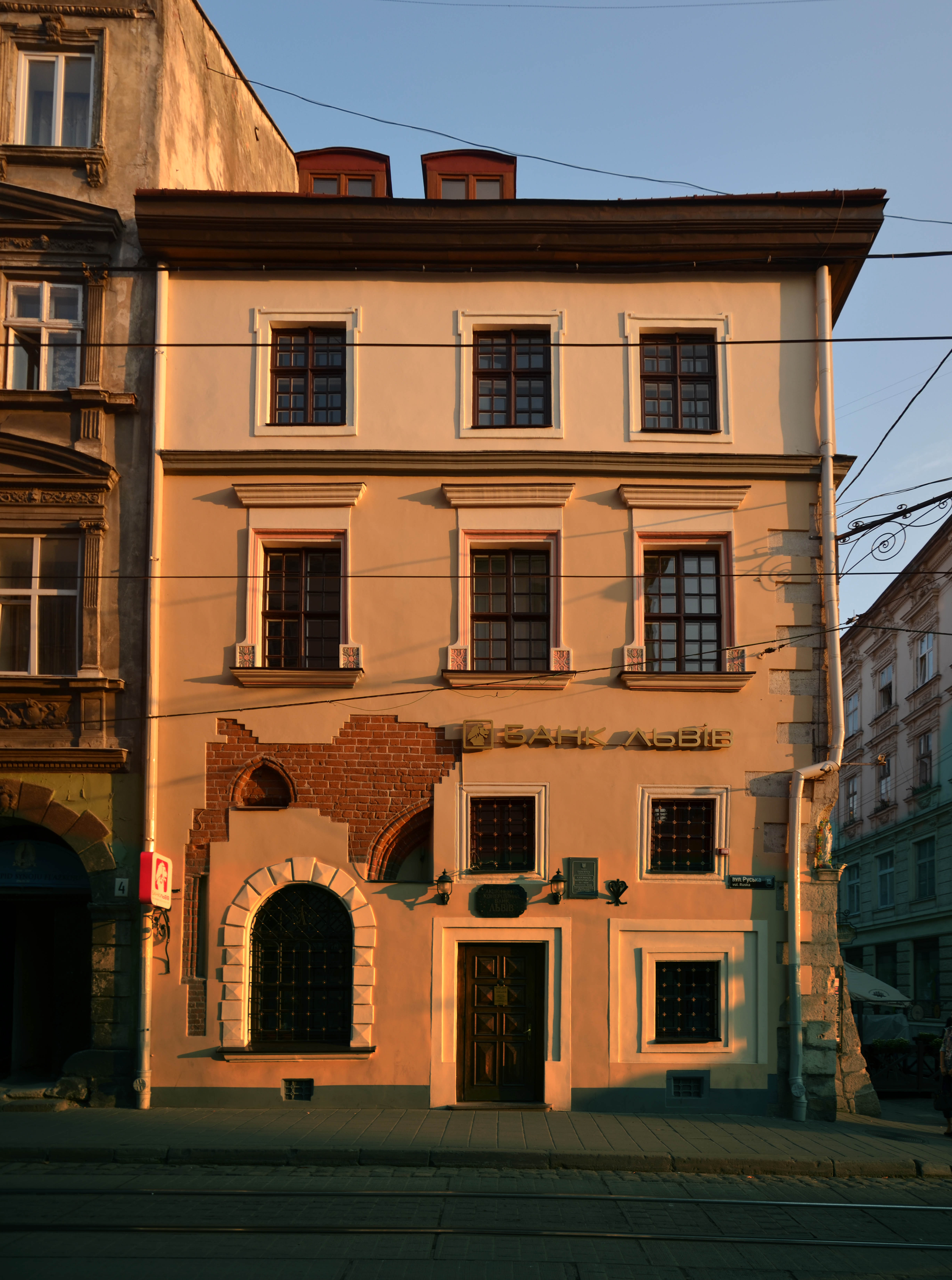
Lviv Bank's building, 1, Serbska Street

In 1991, all Ukrainian banks previously registered in the USSR State Bank were reorganized in the National Bank of Ukraine, and the Ukrainian branches of the former all-Union banks became independent (Oschadbank was spun off from Sberbank, Prominvestbank from Promstroibank, Agroindustrial Bank Ukraine from Agroprombank, Ukrsotsbank from Zhilsotsbank, Ukreximbank from Vnesheconombank).

In 2000, the Lviv Institute of Banking, subordinate to the National Bank of Ukraine, was established on the basis of the Lviv Banking College. At the beginning of 2001, in the Lviv region, there were 79 banking institutions, including four banks (legal entities), as well as 524 off-balance branches (the total amount of funds attracted by banks from individuals and legal entities amounted to 803.7 million hryvnias). In 2005, architect Oleksandr Baziuk designed a modern office center for Ukrsotsbank, which changed the appearance of Mitskevicha Square (at that time the bank was owned by influential businessman Viktor Pinchuk, son-in-law of Ukrainian President Leonid Kuchma).

In 2006, the central building of the State Export-Import Bank of Ukraine branch, facing Mitskevich Square, was built on the site of the former Hotel Europa, known in the Soviet period as Hotel Ukraina, based on old photographs and engravings. In May 2010, in the presence of Lviv Governor Vasyl Horbal and Lviv Mayor Andriy Sadovyy, the new building of State Export-Import Bank of Ukraine was inaugurated (formally it is also located at 4 Mickiewicza Square, but the actual entrance is located on the Voronogo Street side).

Among the largest banking centers of Ukraine, Lviv is in sixth place, traditionally behind Kyiv, Dnipro, Kharkiv, Donetsk, and Odesa. A characteristic feature of banking in Lviv was that the majority of all-Ukrainian banks, while developing a branch network in Western Ukraine, opened their regional centers in the city, which were subordinated to branches in other western regions (Volyn, Zakarpattya, Ivano-Frankivsk, Rivne, and Ternopil). As of October 2013, 90 banks out of 176 operating in Ukraine were functioning in Lviv region (for comparison, in 2009 - 77, in 2010 - 81, in 2011 - 96, in 2012 - 95). All banks that at that time belonged to the group of the largest banks in the country opened their institutions in the region.

As of October 2013, there were 1,142 banking institutions in the Lviv region, including 14 balance sheet institutions and 1,128 off-balance sheet branches. The concentration of banks per 10 thousand people was 4.5 (for comparison, in 2009-2010 it was 4.34, and in 2011-2012 it was 4.66). Almost half of the region's bank branches were concentrated directly in Lviv, where the concentration of banks per 10 thousand people was 7.27. From 2009 to 2013, 23 new banks started operating in the region, and the number of branches increased by 3.6% (during the same period, 56 bank branches were closed and reorganized into off-balance sheet branches).

As of October 2013, banks in Lviv region issued loans for UAH 15.25 billion, and customers' funds in banks amounted to UAH 24.47 billion. 84% of the resource base were deposits of individuals, half of them — in national currency. The average amount of liabilities per structure amounted to UAH 18.05 thousand (67% growth since 2009). After the crisis of 2008–2009, many banks reduced branches, optimized costs, but it became easier for small banks to open branches due to lower costs. At the beginning of 2014, there were 5 legally independent banks, 14 banking institutions and 1,128 off-balance sheet branches in Lviv region. Loan claims decreased by 6.8% to UAH 15.5 billion. Investments in national currency decreased by 10%, and in foreign currency by 2.3%. The share of loans in foreign currency increased from 41.2% to 43.2%.

By type of economic activity, the distribution of loans granted to economic entities was as follows: industry (29.9%), trade (28.7%), agriculture, forestry, and fishing (11.4%), transport and logistics (10.4%), construction (5.4%), and real estate (5.3%). Long-term loans accounted for 70.9% of the total volume of credit investments (their share has been growing continuously since 2005, but in the period from the beginning of 2013 to the beginning of 2014 it decreased by 5 percentage points).

Since 2012, more than half of long-term loans were issued by banks in the Lviv region in hryvnia (in 2012 - 54.1% of the total volume of long-term loans, in 2013 - 52.6%). In the structure of long-term loans, industrial companies were the leaders (30.4%), followed by trade companies (24.7%), transport and logistics (15.3%), real estate companies (8.2%), and construction companies (7.2%). While the volume of long-term loans decreased by 13.5% compared to the beginning of 2013, the volume of short-term loans increased by 14.7% over the same period.

Short-term loans accounted for 29.1% of the total volume of issued loans (67% of short-term loans were issued in hryvnia). By types of economic activity, trade accounted for 35.1% of the total volume of short-term loans, industry — 29.1%, agriculture, forestry and fishing — 24.8%. In the fourth quarter of 2013, the weighted average interest rate on loans was 18.5% in national currency and 10.6% in foreign currency (in the fourth quarter of 2012 — 21.7% and 9.3%, respectively). In general, in 2013 financial (mainly banking) and insurance companies in the Lviv region reduced their financial results more than five times compared to the previous year, the share of loss-making companies in the financial and insurance sector amounted to 38.6%.

In December 2014, the first regional office of the European Bank for Reconstruction and Development in Ukraine was opened in Lviv. From 1997 to the end of 2014, it financed various projects in Lviv for a total of €250 million (including private sector projects for €190 million and municipal projects for €60 million). As of October 2015, foreign investment in Lviv's financial sector accounted for 57.3% of the city's total foreign investment.

=== Lviv banks ===
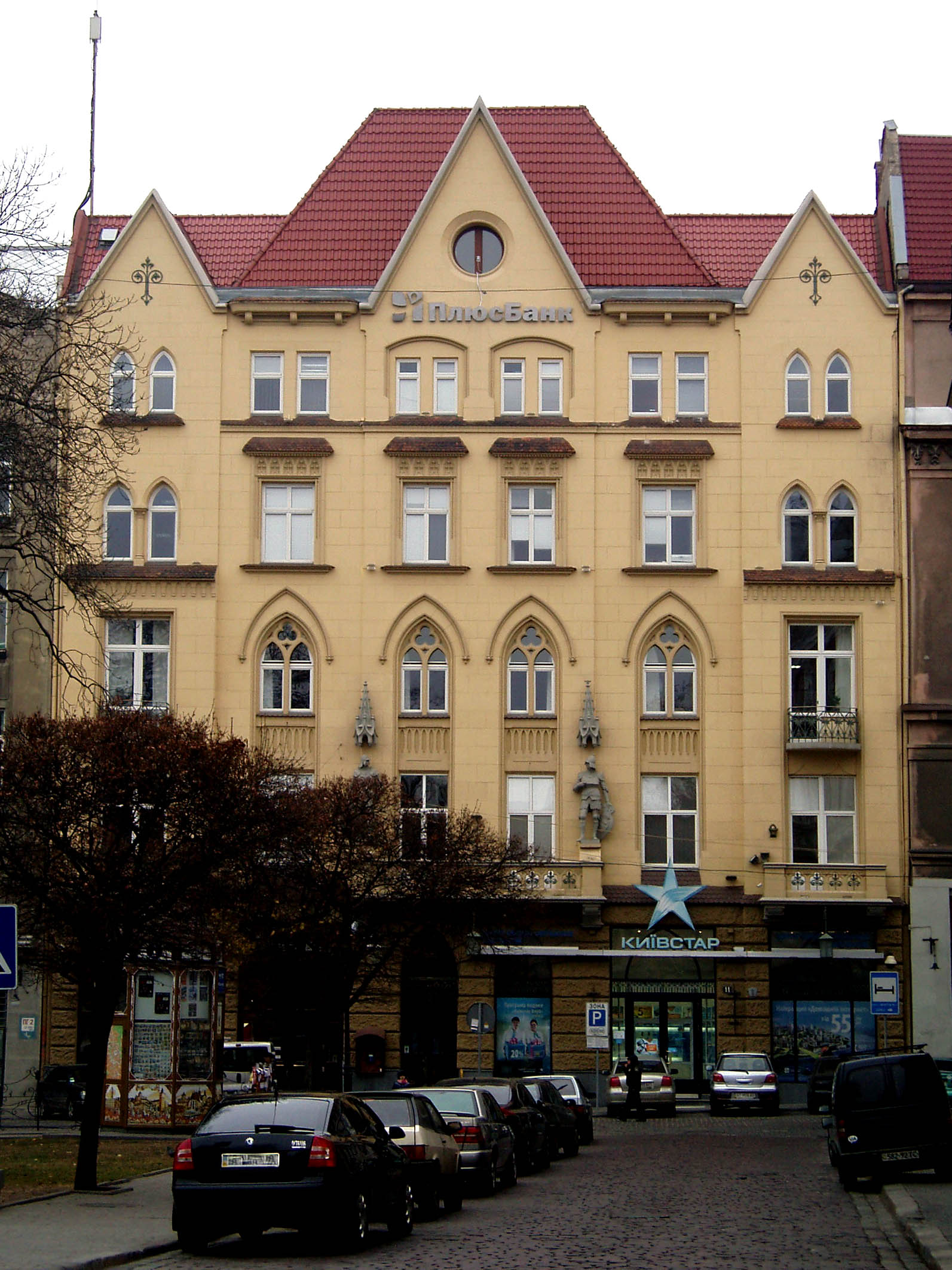
Idea Bank building, 11, Valovaya Street

Four medium-sized banks are based in Lviv: Kredobank (78 Sakharova Street), Bank of Lviv (1 Serbska Street), Idea Bank (11 Valovaya Street), and OKSY Bank (17 Gazovaya Street):

Kredobank was founded in 1990 as West Ukrainian Commercial Bank. In 2004, Kredyt Bank S.A. sold Kredit Bank (Ukraine) to the largest banking group in Poland, PKO Bank Polski, after which, in 2006, the name was changed to Kredobank. In 2007, PKO Bank Polski bought out the stake of the European Bank for Reconstruction and Development and became the sole owner of Kredobank. In 2014, the former chairman of the board of Kredobank, Stepan Kubiv, briefly served as the head of the National Bank.

Bank of Lviv was founded in 1990. In 1992, it acquired a 16th-century emergency house located at the intersection of Serbska and Russka Streets, which it began restoring for its central office (opened in 1998). In 2006, a controlling stake in Bank Lviv was acquired by New Progress Holding, a company owned by Icelandic investors (the largest Icelandic investment in the financial sector of the Ukrainian economy). In 2018, a controlling stake in Bank Lviv was acquired by Swiss asset management company responsAbility Participations, whose shareholders include Baumann & Cie, Raiffeisen Switzerland, Swiss Re Foundation, and Vontobel Beteiligungen.

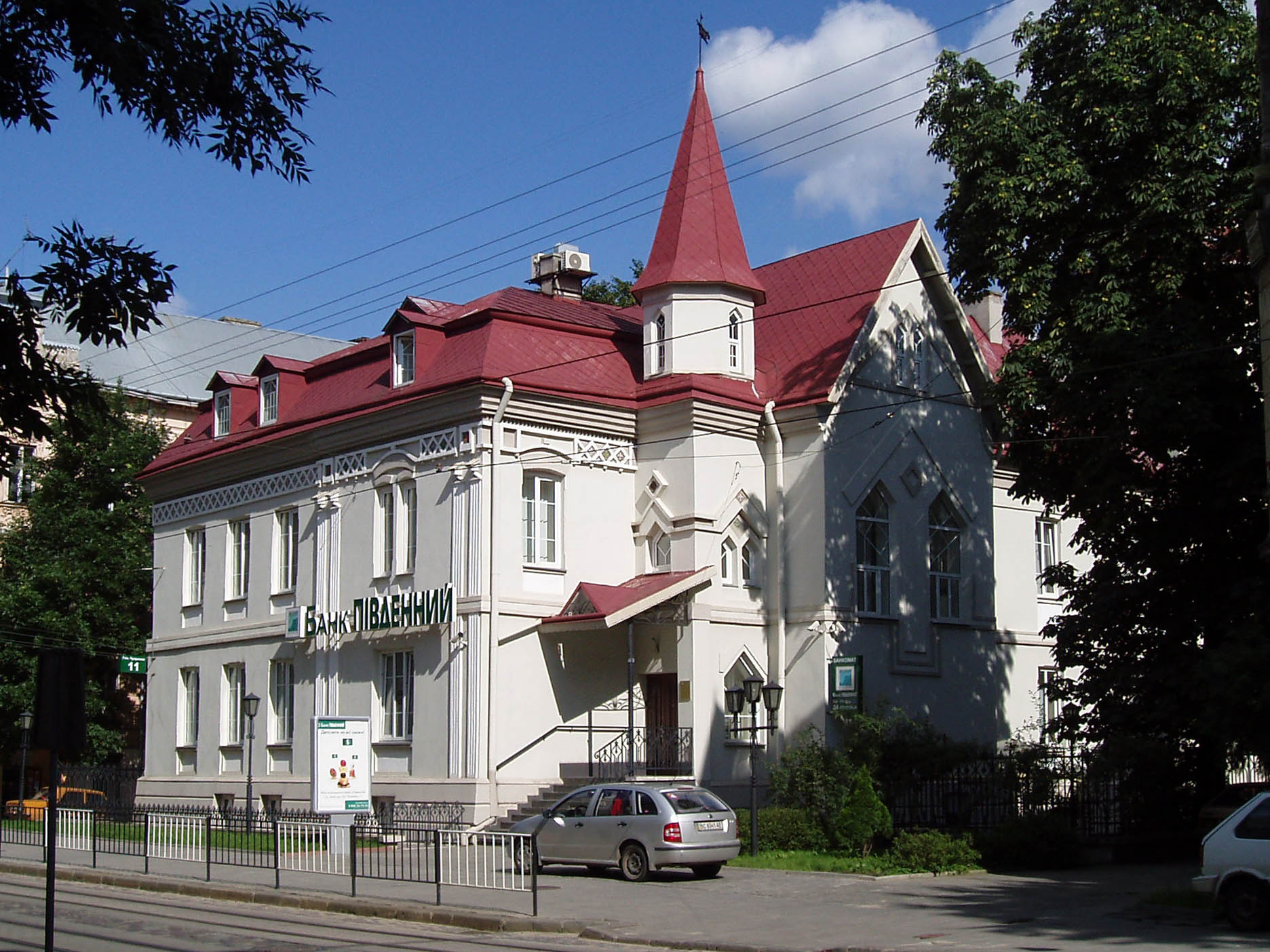
Pivdenniy bank office, 11, Chuprinka Street

Idea Bank was founded in 1989 as Prikarpatlesbank. In 1995, it was reorganized into Prikarpattya. In 2007, the controlling stake in the bank was bought by the Polish financial group Getin Holding, which renamed the institution Plus Bank. In 2011, the bank was renamed Idea Bank and moved its headquarters from Ivano-Frankivsk to Lviv. The bank's headquarters is located in a house built in 1910 by order of the Finkler family for the American Union Insurance Company.

OKSY Bank was founded as a commercial bank GALS in 2008 (it has been under its current name since 2009). Its main shareholder is considered to be local businessman Oleg Balyash, who also owns the vodka brands Getman and Derzhava, electronics store chains Shok and Krez, and several office centers. Unikombank was founded in 2002 as the commercial bank Perspektiva. In 2006, it was renamed Universal Commercial Bank, and in 2007 it received its current name. The largest shareholder of the bank was Kyiv-based businessman Andriy Radkevich (over 40% of shares). Until December 2014, Unikombank was based in Donetsk, then it was re-registered in Lviv. In October 2015, the National Bank of Ukraine recognized it as insolvent.

=== Ukrainian national banks ===
All major banks of the country are represented in Lviv: PrivatBank (Hutsulska Street, 11a), Ukreximbank (Mitskevicha Square, 4), Oschadbank (Secheviye Streltsov Street, 9), Prominvestbank (Hnatiuka Street, 2), Raiffeisen Bank Aval (Mateyko Street, 8), Sberbank of Russia, Alfa Bank (Market Square, 26), FUIB (Grunvaldska Street, 5a), UkrSibbank (Kulisha Street, 30), OTP Bank (Franko Street, 20), Ukrgasbank (Stryyska Street, 98), Credit Agricole Bank (Pekarska Street, 23), ING Bank and Pivdennyi (Chuprinka Street, 11).

Of the largest Ukrainian banks represented in Lviv, a significant portion is owned by foreign capital (including Russian banks: Prominvestbank, Sberbank of Russia, Alfa Bank, Ukrsotsbank, and VTB Bank Ukraine; Austrian — Raiffeisen Bank Aval; French — UkrSibbank and Crédit Agricole Bank; Hungarian — OTP Bank; Dutch — ING Bank). After the annexation of Crimea and the start of the war in Donbas, banks with Russian capital came under the scrutiny of Ukraine's regulatory authorities. Additionally, there was an outflow of deposits from these banks, nationalist forces called on the population to boycott banks with Russian capital, and several branches of these banks were attacked.

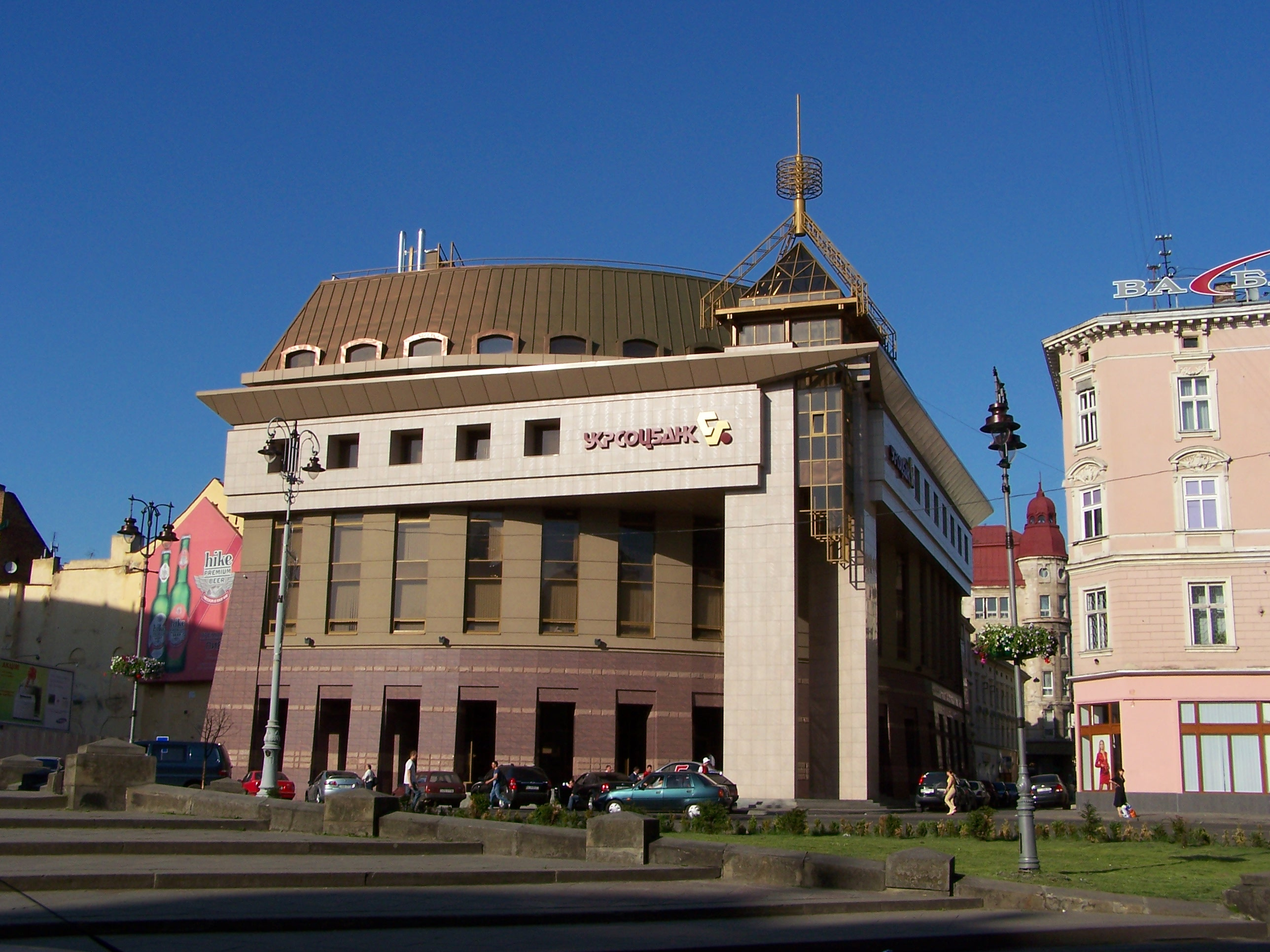
Ukrsotzbank office, Mitskevich Square, 10

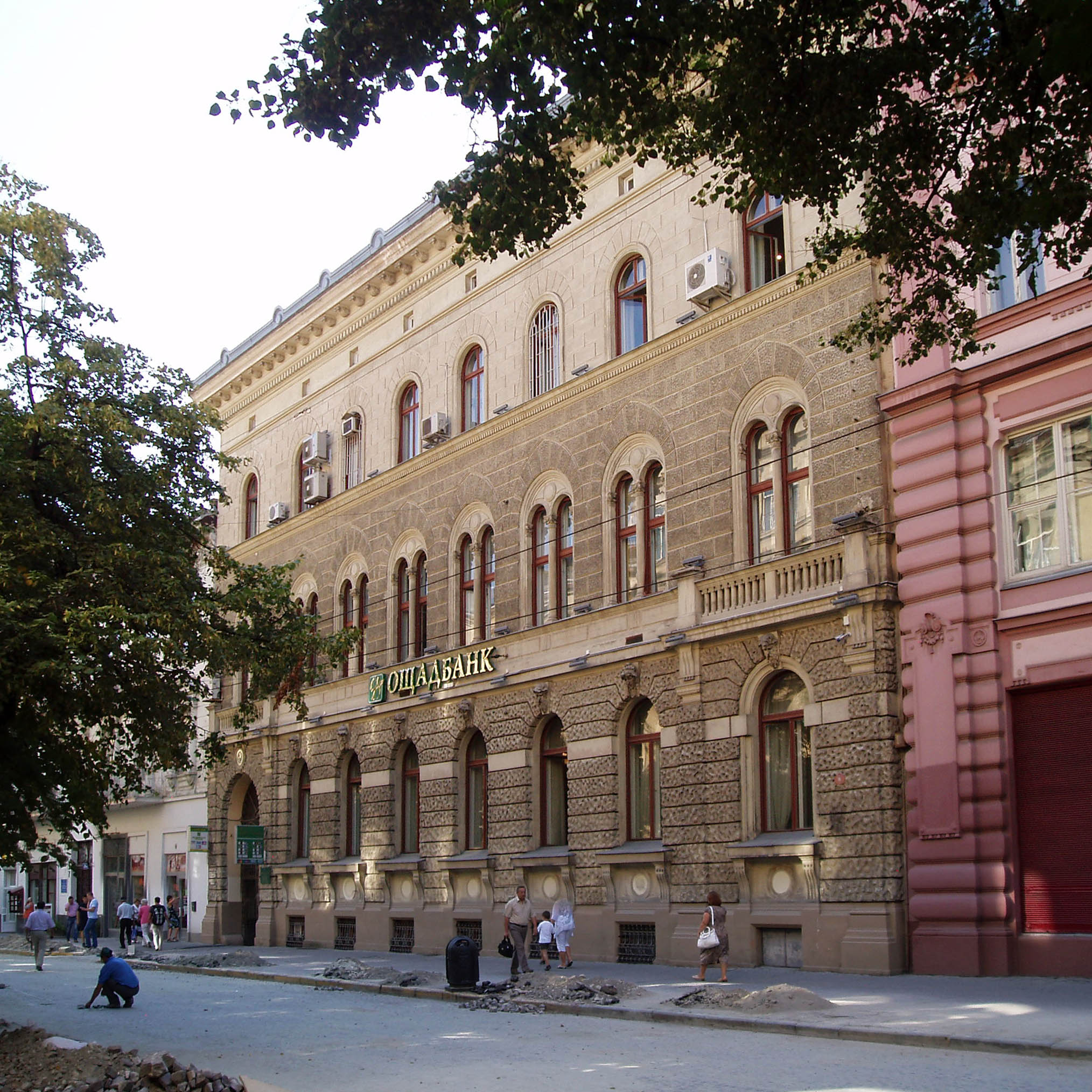
Oschadbank office, Sechevy Streltsy Street, 9

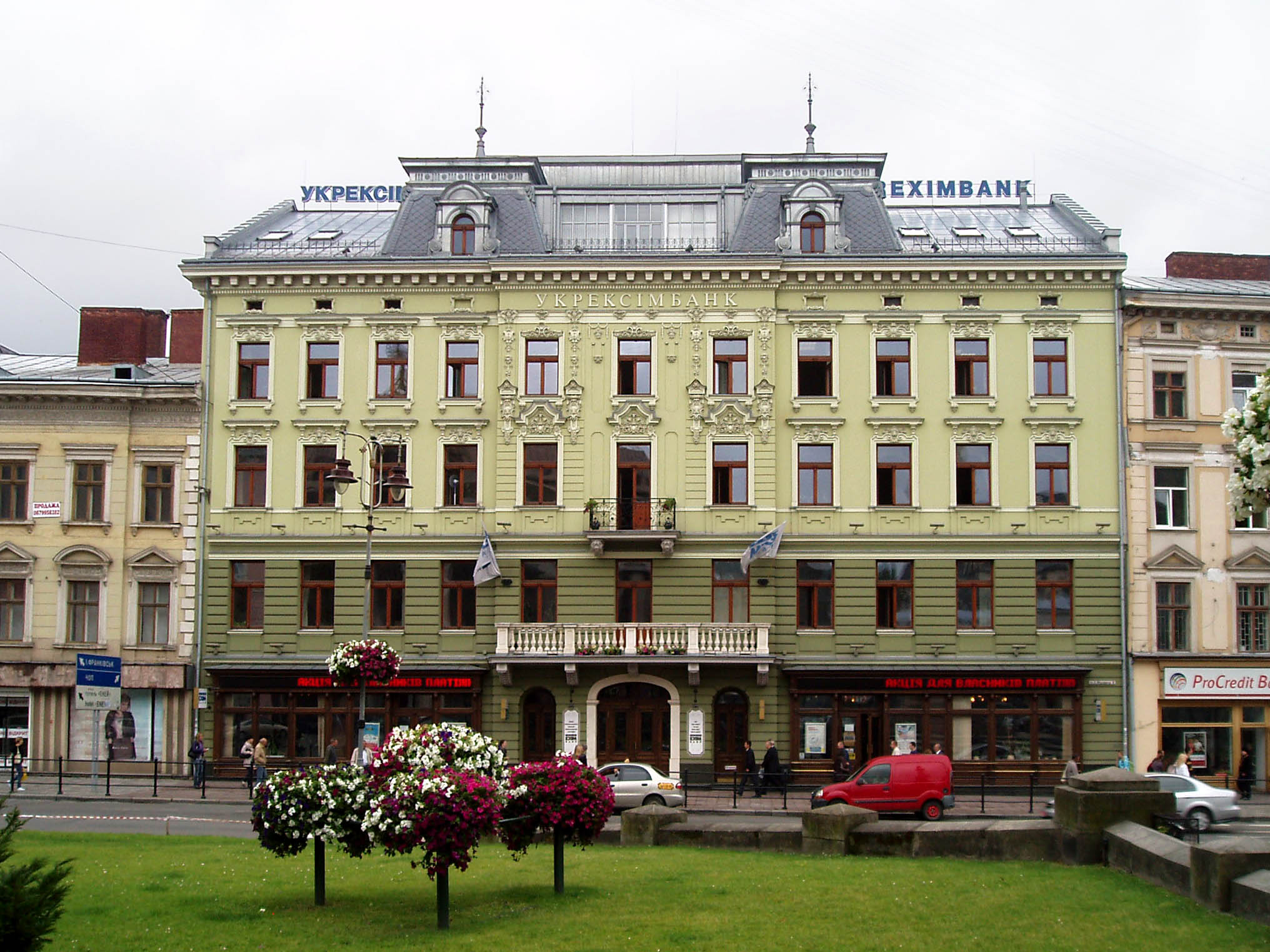
Ukreksimbank office, Mitskevich Square, 4

Only in 2015, four of the largest banks represented in Lviv — Delta Bank, Nadra Bank, Finance and Credit, and Financial Initiative — as well as large Imeksbank, VAB Bank, and Ukrinbank were recognized as insolvent (in addition, in 2014, Brokbusinessbank, Kyivska Rus, and Forum were liquidated among the banks widely represented in Lviv). In 2016, a large bank, Khreshchatyk, was recognized as insolvent.

== See also ==
- Lviv during the Middle Ages

== Bibliography ==
- Biryuliov, Yu. (2008). Архітектура Львова: час і стилі. ХІІІ-ХХІ століття [Architecture of Lviv: Time and Styles. 13th and 14th centuries] (in Ukrainian). Львів: Центр Європи. p. 720. ISBN 9667022773
- Grudzevich Ya., Komarinska Z. (2002). Банки Львова: минуле і сучасне [Banks of Lviv: past and present] (in Ukrainian). Львів: ЛБІ НБУ. p. 223.
- Kozitskiy A., Pidkova І. (2007). Енциклопедія Львова [Encyclopedia of Lviv] (in Ukrainian). Vol. 1. Львів: Літопис: Літопис. p. 656.
- Kozitskiy, А. (2008). Енциклопедія Львова [Encyclopedia of Lviv] (in Ukrainian). Vol. 2. Львів: Літопис. p. 608. ISBN 978-966-7007-69-0.
- Moshenskiy, S. (2014). Финансовые центры Украины и рынок ценных бумаг индустриальной эпохи [Financial Centers of Ukraine and the Securities Market of the Industrial Era] (in Russian). Лондон: Xlibris. p. 503. ISBN 1499089201
- Gerald, D. (2015). Feldman. Austrian Banks in the Period of National Socialism. Cambridge University Press. p. 600. ISBN 9781107001657.
