= List of tallest buildings in Ukraine =

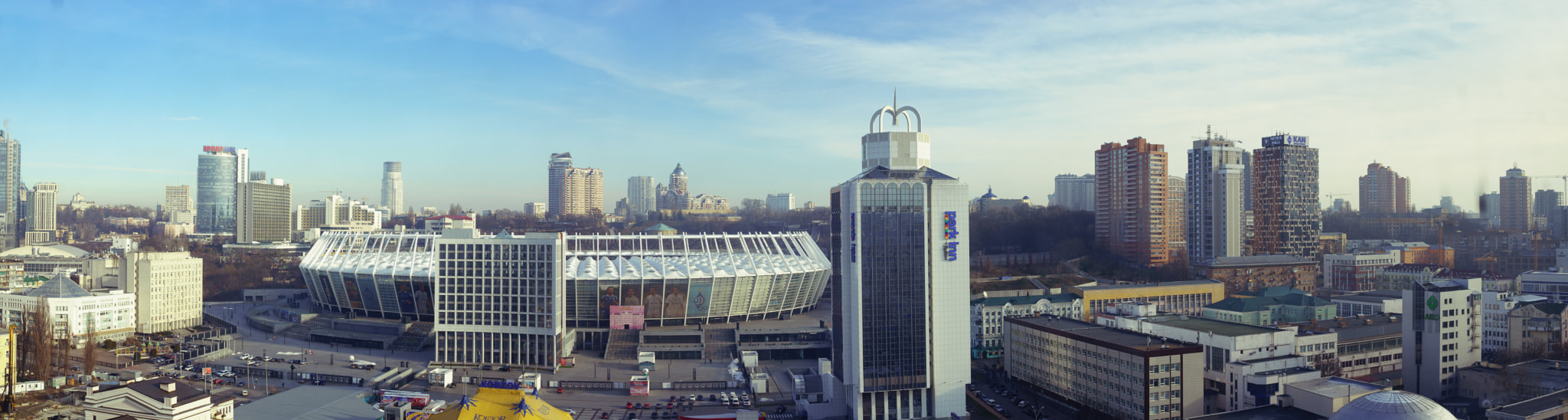
Kyiv's skyline in 2018.

This is a list of the tallest buildings in Ukraine. Buildings are ranked according to their architectural height. Most of Ukrainian high-rises are situated in its capital city, Kyiv. Ukrainian minimal skyscraper height since 2009 is considered to be 100 metres and higher.

The current tallest building in Ukraine is the 168-metre tall Klovski Descent 7A, an apartment building that was completed in 2012 and opened in 2015. Also, the unfinished Sky Towers business centre was planned to have 214 metres, but the construction was put on hold in 2016 with only half of the building done.

== Tallest buildings ==
Was the tallest building in Ukraine upon completion

This list ranks completed and topped-out buildings. An equal sign (=) following a rank indicates the same height between two or more buildings. The "Year" column indicates the year in which a building was or will be completed.

Rank	Name	Image	Location	Year	Height (m)	Floors	Notes
1	Carnegie Center Tower		Kyiv 50°26′18.7″N 30°32′21.1″E	2011	168.0	47	Originally planned as a 32-story building, later the owner decided to increase the height. Topped out in 2012.
2	Gulliver		Kyiv 50°26′19.8″N 30°31′26.5″E	2012	160.1	35	Original project was called City Plaza, later the name was changed to Continental, then to Esplanade, until it got its nowadays name. Topped out in 2008.
3	Jack House		Kyiv 50°26′04.0″N 30°31′55.3″E	2018	152.5	39	Topped out in 2017. Shelled by Russia in 2024.
4	Parus Business Centre		Kyiv 50°26′15.5″N 30°31′37.9″E	2006	136.0	34	Formerly known as Elsburg Plaza. Topped out in 2006.
5	Mayak		Dnipro 48°27′55.2″N 35°03′55.1″E	2025	135.0	36	Tallest building in Dnipro. Topped out in 2023.
6	Taryan Towers		Kyiv 50°25′09.8″N 30°32′01.3″E	2026	131.8	35	Topped out in 2019.
7=	Pokrovskyi Posad		Kyiv 50°27′42.8″N 30°29′37.1″E	2015	130.0	29	Topped out in 2012.
7=	Manhattan City		Kyiv 50°26′53.1″N 30°28′48.1″E	2023	130.0	36	Topped out in 2019. Shelled by Russia in 2022.
8=	Korona		Kyiv 50°24′02.6″N 30°36′59.6″E	2008	128.0	37	
9=	Korona 2		Kyiv 50°24′07.5″N 30°37′50.5″E	2008	128.0	37	
9	Court of Appeals		Kyiv 50°25′50.0″N 30°28′17.4″E	2006	127.0	27	Formerly known as Ministry of Water Management. The construction was put on hold for some time. Topped out in 2005.
11	Bashty		Dnipro 48°27′46.4″N 35°03′53.0″E	2005	123.0	30	
12	Parus		Kyiv 50°29′26.2″N 30°31′40.0″E	2011	122.3	30	Topped out in 2010.
13	Ministry of Infrastructure		Kyiv 50°26′58.3″N 30°28′52.0″E	1986	120.0	28	Reconstructed in 2003.
13	Bartolomeo Resort Town		Dnipro 48°26′54.8″N 35°04′37.0″E	2023	117.8	32	
14	101 Tower		Kyiv 50°26′20.9″N 30°29′47.1″E	2012	116.1	28	Originally planned as 123.5 m high building. Topped out in 2011. Shelled by Russia in 2022.
15=	TsarSky		Kyiv 50°25′39.9″N 30°32′45.6″E	2008	115.0	29	
15=	Mega City		Kyiv 50°25′51.5″N 30°38′04.4″E	2014	115.0	36	The construction of this building is considered to be illegal. Topped out in 2012.
15=	A136		Kyiv 50°25′09.9″N 30°31′06.0″E	2025	115.0	33	Topped out in 2024.
16=	Kyivska Venetsiya		Kyiv 50°26′19.2″N 30°36′35.6″E	2016	114.0	36	Topped out in 2014.
16=	Metropolis		Kyiv 50°22′08.9″N 30°27′48.0″E	2024	114.0	34	
16=	Parus Hotel		Dnipro 48°28′38.5″N 35°02′11.6″E	—	114.0	32	Topped out, put on hold in 1994.
17=	King's Tower		Donetsk 47°59′45.9″N 37°49′03.4″E	2008	112.0	29	Tallest building in Donetsk.
17=	Royal Tower		Kyiv 50°26′06.2″N 30°30′44.0″E	2016	112.0	30	Ukraine's first building with garden on the roof.
17=	Delmar		Kyiv 50°24′41.8″N 30°32′40.0″E	2019	112.0	32	
18	Elegant		Kyiv 50°26′31.2″N 30°29′48.4″E	2014	111.5	32	The construction of this building is considered to be illegal. Shelled by Russia in 2022.
19	Silver Breeze		Kyiv 50°25′43.6″N 30°35′40.1″E	2009	110.2	32	Two buildings were completed in 2009, third one was topped out in 2012 and still remains unfinished. Shelled by Russia in 2025.
20=	Proviantska Street 3		Kyiv 50°27′04.9″N 30°28′19.2″E	2003	110.0	29	
20=	Lesi Ukrainky Boulevard 7		Kyiv 50°25′58.2″N 30°32′02.0″E	2012	110.0	31	Topped out in 2009.
20=	Mirax		Kyiv 50°27′45.5″N 30°29′45.6″E	2026	110.0	31	Original project was called Capital Center, later the name was changed to Mirax Plaza Ukraine, until it got its nowadays name. Originally planned as 192.0 m high building. The construction was put on hold for eight years. Topped out in 2019.
21=	Mykhaila Hryshka Street 9		Kyiv 50°23′43.4″N 30°38′02.1″E	2006	108.9	32	
21=	Sun Rivera		Kyiv 50°27′01.2″N 30°35′10.8″E	2018	108.9	31	Topped out in 2017.
22=	Volodymyr Ivasyuk Avenue 12Zh		Kyiv 50°30′23.3″N 30°30′45.6″E	2005	108.0	27	Topped out in 2004.
22=	Ark Palace		Odesa 46°26′19.1″N 30°45′30.9″E	2008	108.0	25	Tallest building in Odesa.
22=	Dniprovski Vezhi		Kyiv 50°29′52.8″N 30°34′46.2″E	–	108.0	35	
23	Revutskoho Street 9		Kyiv 50°25′08.8″N 30°38′33.2″E	2014	107.0	34	
24	Congress Hall		Donetsk 47°59′56″N 37°48′19″E	2011	106.0	27	
25	Azure Blues		Kyiv 50°26′39.5″N 30°36′14.7″E	2011	105.6	26	
26	Hilton Kyiv		Kyiv 50°26′43.1″N 30°30′17.7″E	2014	105.4	26	Topped out in 2012.
27=	Olimpiiskyi		Kyiv 50°25′57.8″N 30°30′52.6″E	2005	105.0	31	
27=	Victory V		Kyiv 50°26′47.9″N 30°29′12.2″E	2019	105.0	34	Topped out in 2018.
27=	Slavutych		Kyiv 50°23′43.5″N 30°36′16.5″E	2021	105.0	33	Topped out in 2019. Shelled by Russia in 2023.
28	Oleksandra Mishuhy Street 12		Kyiv 50°23′44.6″N 30°38′11.3″E	2010	104.4	33	
29	Panoramnyi		Donetsk 47°59′49.4″N 37°48′50.3″E	2012	104.0	26	Topped out in 2011.
30	Illich Avenue 19Z		Donetsk 48°00′02.1″N 37°49′47.2″E	2008	103.4	25	
31	Novopecherski Lypky		Kyiv 50°24′32.1″N 30°32′45.5″E	2024	102.3	31	Topped out in 2012.
32	Bohdana Khmelnytskoho Street 41		Kyiv 50°26′51″N 30°30′09.1″E	2004	101.5	26	
33	Pivnichnyi		Donetsk 48°02′18.5″N 37°46′53.3″E	2012	100.6	25	Topped out in 2011.

== Tallest buildings under construction, approved and proposed ==
=== Under construction ===
Name	Image	Location	Year (est.)	Height (m)	Stories	Notes
Sky Towers		Kyiv 50°26′54.9″N 30°28′37.5″E	—	214.3	47	Formerly known as ZAGS. Put on hold in 2016, during 28th floor assembly.
Nver		Kyiv 50°26′01.2″N 30°31′56.5″E	2027	161.5	42	
The One		Kyiv 50°26′16.6″N 30°31′57.6″E	2028	156.75	40 (38 residential)	Currently on a stage of floors assembly.
St. Michael's Cathederal Belfry		Cherkasy 49°26′03.0″N 32°03′26.0″E	2020	134.0	14	Construction canceled in 2020, topped out on 10 floor and 50 meters.
Christ Resurrection Cathederal		Kyiv 50°24′31.1″N 30°31′39.6″E	—	120.0	9	Put on hold in 2017, during 2nd floor assembly.
National Medical University		Kyiv 50°27′14.5″N 30°27′21.2″E	—	112.8	25	Put on hold in 2012, during 22nd floor assembly.
Oasis		Kyiv 50°28′29.2″N 30°31′55.2″E	2023	112.0	32	Currently on a stage of floors assembly.

=== Approved and proposed ===
Rank	Name	Image	Location	Planned height (m)	Stories
1	Tryzub		Kyiv 50°27′12.4″N 30°35′43.9″E	465.0	101
2	Odvichne Syaivo		Kyiv 50°28′29.2″N 30°31′55.2″E	300	63
3	Victory Towers		Kyiv 50°26′53.1″N 30°28′48.1″E	285	54
4	Kadets'kyi Hai		Kyiv 50°26′41.1″N 30°28′42.1″E	215	60
5	Brama		Dnipro 48°28′04.3″N 35°02′58.3″E	210	54

== Cities with buildings over 100 metres ==
City	≥300 m	≥250 m	≥200 m	≥150 m	≥100 m
Kyiv	-	-	-	3	41
Donetsk	–	–	-	-	6
Dnipro	–	–	–	-	3
Odesa	–	–	–	-	2
