= Gulliver (building) =

- frontal view of the office part of the building as seen from Baseina Street
- Former names: City Plaza (2003–2006); Esplanade (2006–2008); Continental (2008–2011)

General information
- Status: Completed
- Type: mixed-use
- Location: Kyiv, Ukraine, Sportyvna Square 1A
- Coordinates: 50°26′19″N 30°31′23″E
- Construction started: August 2003
- Construction stopped: April 2010
- Completed: August 2012
- Opened: 4 October 2013
- Inaugurated: 30 November 2013
- Cost: $200,000,000
- Owner: Oschadbank (80%); Ukreximbank (20%)

Height
- Architectural: 160.1 m (525 ft)
- Roof: 141.8 m (465 ft)

Technical details
- Floor count: 35 + 4 below ground
- Floor area: 155,000 m^{2} (1,668,406 sq ft)

Design and construction
- Architects: Serhiy Babushkin; Tetiana Hryhorova
- Developer: TRI O; Mandarin Plaza Group; Alliance Novobud
- Main contractor: Interwood

Website
- gullivercenter.com/en

The Gulliver multifunctional complex is a state-owned 35-story mixed-use skyscraper in Kyiv, the capital of Ukraine.

It is located at the very center of the city near Palats Sportu metro station (municipal address: 1, Sportyvna Sq). It is the second-highest building and the highest office building in the country.

The complex consists of a 35-story office building and an adjoining 10- to 16-story shopping mall with movie theaters, restaurants and other business and entertainment spots.

The building switched several names over the course of construction before in 2011 it was named 'Gulliver' after the eponymous hero of Jonathan Swift's novel Gulliver's Travels.

== History ==
The current site of Gulliver used to be occupied with private housing since the 19th century. In 1958–1960 the Kyiv Palace of Sports had been built nearby and the future building location was cleared to organize a park next to the complex, the tram line was extended there and further into Pechersk. In 1989 the park territory has been used as a construction site for Palats Sportu metro station. After the construction's end the park was restored and the fountain was built in it.

In 1995 development company TRI O tried to build a gas station on a part of the park on Esplanadna street but was forced to stop the work after a media backlash. In 1997 the company was sold and Turkmen businessman Vagif Aliev became one of its owners.

In 1998 the tram line has been moved from the street, separating trams and automobiles. On a place where the park has been the tram terminus was built but it did not last long since the tram lines in the city centre had been dismantled in 2001.

9 November 2002 Vagif Aliev, who just recently opened his first mall Mandarin Plaza, ordered two new projects nearby from head architect of Kyiv Serhiy Babushkin. One project was an office tower Elsburg Plaza (future Parus Business Centre) and a four-floor shopping mall City Plaza (future Gulliver). In the process of design two more floors were added to the mall.

In March 2003 the project was presented at the meeting of Kyiv Architecture Department. While City Plaza was criticized for its size, it managed to get an approval thanks to Babushkin's authority.

The construction began in August 2003. Building's large size caused problems with surrounding infrastructure, this resulted in construction progress slowing down and its value increasing. Engineering networks relocation costed $3 million, then the permission from Kyiv City State Administration had to be granted to demolish the public toilet that interfered with the project. It took four years to build an underground parking lot, which was completed in July 2006.

Looking for the ways to increase the profitability it was decided to redesign it into a skysraper. Fearing that finding tenants for two business centers located next to each other would be impossible, it was decided to make the tower residential. The new project had a white concrete facade with glass floors on top and the mall section had a park on its roof. City Plaza has been renamed to Esplanade after the street it was located on.

6 July 2006 Bureau Veritas was contracted for technical and financial control of the construction.

The same year office buildings started growing in demand and a lot of offices in Elsburg Plaza were rented out before the construction was completed. This made Aliev change his mind and reconceptualize the complex once again, the tower was now planned to become a business centre. In June 2007 the project simplified the facade, making it all-glass. New project added a smaller tower behind the main one and both of them received metal roof structures.

In December 2007 the first piece of glass facade was installed on the office part by EVB. In March 2008 the final 35th floor was assembled and the technical floor was finished in April.

In 2008 JLL Inc. was hired to consult TRI O in finding tenants, the company advised to rename the complex to Yevropeiskyi Kvartal (Ukrainian: Європейський квартал, European Quarter), but Aliev did not like the name and called it Continental instead. In August Furshet supermarket chain became the first tenant of the mall.

In October 2008 ThyssenKrupp installed the elevators in the building. In November work on the mall section has been started. In March 2009 the cranes were dismantled.

Due to the financial crisis rental stakes fell, so it was decided to delay the construction once again to change the project once again, metal structures and the rooftop park were removed while the top floors of the mall had expanded. Continental was one of the few construction projects in Kyiv that hadn't been put on hold during the crisis. It was planned to finish the building until the Autumn in 2010 but after the change of ownership it was postponed to 2011.

In 2011 the complex got renamed to Gulliver and the opening date got pushed back to second quarter of 2012. In August, the completion certificate had been received making Gulliver Ukraine's newest tallest building.

In February 2013 Pioneer Design Studio presented the project of Gulliver's advertisement banners and their nighttime illumination.

In April 2013 signs were installed onto the building. In May work on entrances and surrounding area began. In August Blachere Illumination LED LCD has been installed at the towers, throughout the next month it undergone the test run. 4 October Gulliver was opened, the official ceremony took place 30 November-1 December.

In July 2019 the advertisement banners had been taken down from Gulliver. Instead of them in October Media Display installed the 4000 m² screen onto the mall that became Ukraine's largest media facade.

== Projects ==
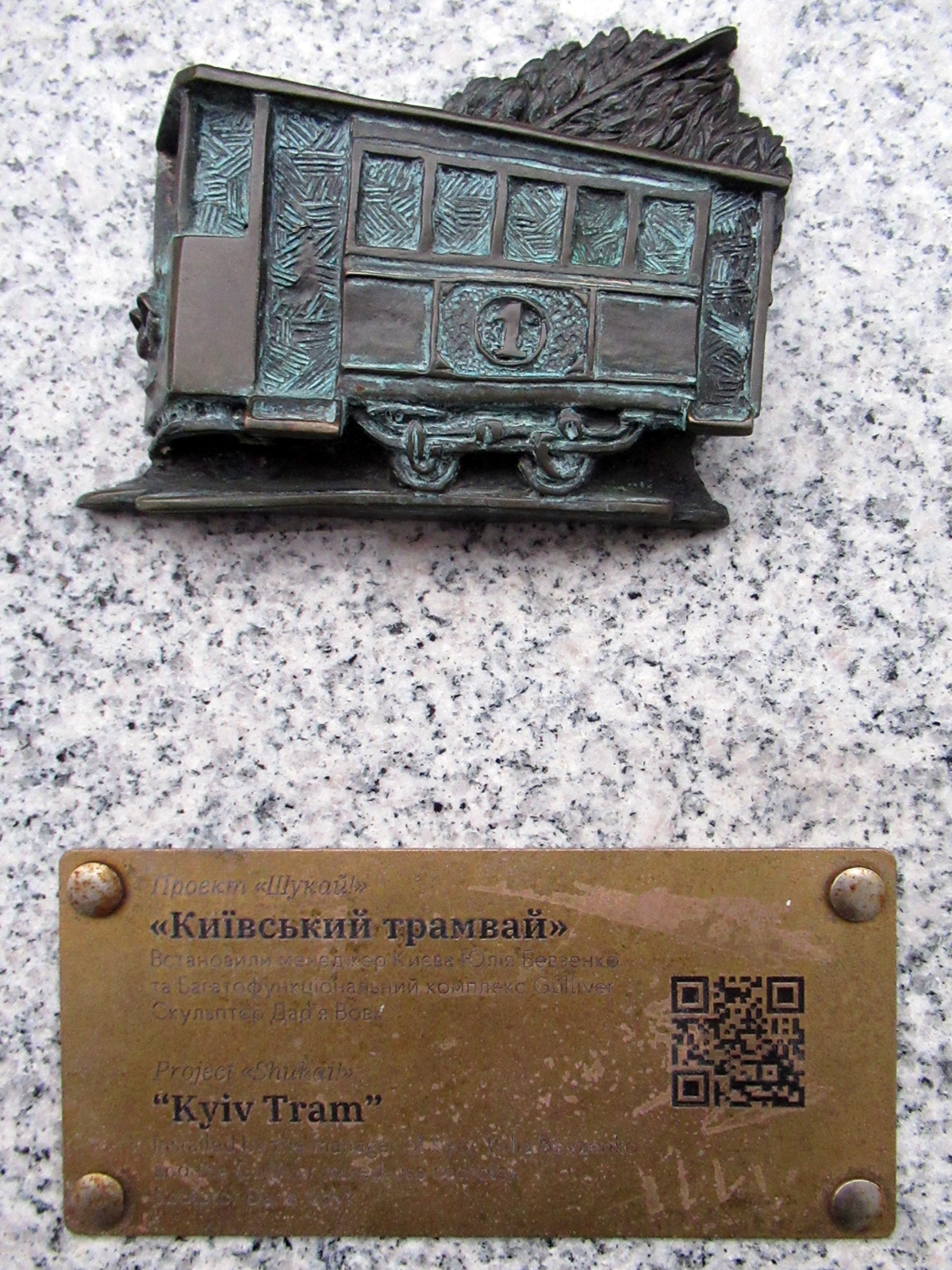
'Kyiv Tram' sculpture by Daria Vovk. Part of the 'Shukai!' art project.

As a part of 2014 Kyiv Day celebrations 'I ♥ Kyiv' photo zone had been installed at Gulliver entrance.

In 2015 head of Gulliver's PR department Tetiana Atadzhanova in collaboration with 'Common Victory' public organization (Спільна перемога) opened the Hollywood Walk of Fame-inspired 'Stars Square' in front of the mall with first nine autographs of Ukrainian celebrities. Nowadays the number rose up to 29.

Since 2016 the mall publishes Gulliver Times fashion magazine with its online version available at Gulliver's website.

In preparation for Eurovision Song Contest 2017 Gulliver organized the 'History of Eurovision' photo exhibition, the first one in event's history. The collection showcased the historical moments of the contest's 62 years of history.

27 May 2018 miniature sculpture art project 'Shukai!' (Search!) installed Daria Vovk's sculpture 'Kyiv Tram' on the entrance to Gulliver. It was opened by Kyiv's manager and project's author Yuliya Bevzenko. 'Kyiv Tram' became the sixth sculpture of the project, the mall was chosen as its location because it was built on a place of a former tram terminus.

15 September 2021 artists Vitaliy Hidevan and Yelena Noina drew a 16x8 mural called 'Cosmic Universe' on a technical floor of Gulliver at the height of 140 meters to celebrate mall's 8th anniversary. Book of Records of Ukraine expert Vitaliy Zorin recorded it as a mural drawn at the tallest point. The mural began a series of space-themed events as a part of celebration.

== Ownership controversies ==
In 1995 the sons of the future Mayor of Kyiv Oleksandr Omelchenko founded the TRI O development company. Brothers Oleksandr and Yan planned to build a gas station in the city center and purchased a land near the Palats Sportu metro station. This caused a controversy in the media and the preparation work had been suspended.

In 1997 TRI O was sold to Turkmen developer Vagif Aliev and Ukrainian politicians Oleksiy Kucherenko and Serhiy Veselov. New owners managed to buy an additional hectare of land for $2 million and hire Interwood construction company for the project. Aliev also owned Elsburg Plaza (now Parus Business Centre) located nearby which he sold prior to its completion in 2007 to invest in Gulliver, which was known as Esplanade at the time.

In 2005, while City Plaza has been redesigned into a residential complex TRI O took $34.5 million credit from Ukreximbank and Raiffeisen Bank Ukraine (now OTP Bank Ukraine). In October 2008 Ukreximbank and Oschadbank increased the credit line to $177.6 million.

The pledge were Veselov's and Aliev's stakes in British companies Graph Limited and Arch Consortium Limited respectively. In 2010 with agreement of Veselov Oschadbank sold them to another British company Unicon Development Ltd. This caused the conflict between the owners and in April 2010 Aliev had left TRI O and the construction was temporarily put on hold until the Autumn, when the company was taken over by Veselov. In December 2011 Supreme Economic Court of Ukraine cancelled Unicon's acquisition of TRI O.

In 2012 on the final stages of building's construction TRI O was sold to Victor Polishchuk, Ukrainian oligarch and a member of then-President of Ukraine Viktor Yanukovych's clan known as 'the Yanukovych family', he has been investing in construction since 2008. Next year he would start the Mykhailivskyi Bank that would have its office in Gulliver.

Soon after Gulliver's opening European Union–Ukraine Association Agreement failed which lead to Revolution of Dignity. During the revolution Yanukovych and a lot of his allies fled the country. In 2016, under the new government, Mykhailivskyi Bank's management stole ₴1.5 billion from the bank which lead to its bankruptcy. After that Polishchuk had left the country, leaving bank's customers and Gulliver's dept unpaid.

In September 2016 police suspected the ex-chairman of the Mykhailivskyi Bank Ihor Doroshenko. 14 November, as a part of the case, Gulliver had been arrested, the building kept working during the arrest. 25 November Security Service of Ukraine (SBU) conducted their investigation in Gulliver, during the procedure mall's security has been blocking the entrances. 10 January 2017 the arrest was lifted by Kyiv Court of Appeal. Throughout that time Polishchuk was never suspected, after giving a loan guarantee, Vyacheslav Ihnatenko became the new owner of TRI O. Gulliver's director since 2014 Iryna Kruppa would give an interview where she called Polishchuk's ties to the mall 'just a rumor'.

Throughout summer 2017 SBU has been conducting investigations on the floors of Gulliver that belonged to ex-Minister of Revenues and Duties Oleksandr Klymenko, who has been suspected in corruption and fled to Russia. Chief Military Prosecutor of Ukraine Anatolii Matios stated that at the floors 31–33 of Tower A offices of Klymenko's 'secret bank' were found. Following the investigation the floors were arrested and the control over them has been transferred to the Asset Tracing and Management Agency (ARMA).

In April 2018 Oschadbank began to restructurize the depts of the companies that belonged to Polishchuk who returned to Ukraine at the time. In September the bank used the Electronic Auctions of Seized Property System (SETAM) to sell Gulliver for ₴18.177 billion, ten participants would apply but all of them eventually had been declined for unknown reasons.

In 2020 TRI O restructured its dept and extended the credit's validity period to 2044. In 2021 ARMA-controlled floors were returned to the owner.

After Russia's full-scale invasion of Ukraine in February 2022 the mall closed down as many others and credit payments have stopped, causing Polishchuk to restart the restructurization negotiations. The mall reopened 2 April with schedule adapted to curfew.

In 2023 Bureau of Economical Safety (BEB) exposed the tax evasion of Iryna Kruppa, she had a dept of ₴145.8 million. At the same time the mall had been concluding fake contracts for works that weren't actually being made.

9 April 2024 Kyiv Court of Appeal issued an arrest on Gulliver for TRI O not paying the dept. 3 June Shevchenkivskyi District Court transferred the control over the complex to ARMA. Gulliver's administration then stated that they consider such actions a hostile takeover.

In October 2024 Gulliver's value was estimated by Business Consulting as ₴7.6 billion. 10 January 2025 ARMA hosted a new management contest for the complex, the companies registered were Millenium, Alacor City and Esplanade. Millenium has won the contest but eventually all the competitors had been turned down by ARMA for having ties to either the previous owner or Russia.

26 March 2025 the consortium of Oschadbank and Ukreximbank began the process of dept collection in form of gaining the control over Gulliver.

In April 2025 Ukrainska Pravda online newspaper tried to rent Gulliver's media facade to celebrate their 25th anniversary but mall's management, still affiliated with previous owner, denied the journalists because of their 2021 article on Victor Polishchuk called 'Steal the billions from the state and not become a criminal. The history of the Mykhailivskyi Bank'.

21 April 2025 ARMA announced another management contest with Millenium, Limex Express Kyiv and Alacor City signing up. Millenium has won once again causing the contest to fail.

26 July 2025 state banks announced that the dept collection process is completed with Oschadbank (80%) and Ukreximbank (20%) becoming Gulliver's new owners. Consortium invited tenants to contact Oschadbank's legal advisory company Sayenko Kharenko for re-registration of contractual relations due to lack of legal grounds to pay the former owner.

Following the announcement TRI O made a statement that back on 3 March 2025 they've initiated a financial leasing through Commercial Court of Kyiv so that the complex would remain under the banks' control until the dept is paid therefore making the change of ownership illegal. Contest winner Limex Express Kyiv also criticized the decision because, according to company's press release, after the win they've never been contacted to sign the ownership documents.

13 October 2025 ARMA announced that they are officially giving up the attempts of finding Gulliver a manager and returning the complex to the state. 17 October Oschadbank announced that the arrest of the building had been lifted.

30 October 2025 at 22:00 Oschadbank decided to close Gulliver for indefinite term. Bank stated that TRI O had blocked the access to mall's critical systems and technical documentation endangering both the visitors and the tenants. Police had been informed about the corporate conflict. 7 November Oschadbank stated that during the inspection critical systems were found to be sabotaged, particularly the electricity and water supply systems had been blocked, reserve supply equipment, cables and warning systems had been damaged, IT infrastructure and technical documentation was missing.

12 November 2025 Northern Economic Court of Appeal (PAHS) upheld Polishchuk's complaint about the legality of ownership transfer.

19 November 2025 Victor Polishchuk gave an interview to Ekonomichna Pravda where he stated that Gulliver has been unfairly taken over by the state because of Head of Office of the President of Ukraine Andriy Yermak not knowing that he stopped paying the dept to finance the repair of war-damaged critical infrastructure. According to Polishchuk, Yermak started the transfer by 'giving the command' to his former business partner Roza Tapanova who at the time was a head of Oschadbank supervisory board. Later that day Oschadbank responded with criticism, stating that the mall is being transferred not to the state but to state banks and that Polishchuk tries to make the issue seem political because they've recently filed a lawsuit against him in London Court of International Arbitration (LCIA) to collect the funds as well as the proceedings in Commercial Court of Kyiv on the bankruptcy of TRI O. The bank also provided statistics by which Polischuk has been changing the credit terms 67 times and the dept has been restructurized 29 times.

21 November 2025 TRI O announced that they are appealing against Gulliver's ownership transfer and are planning to appeal against their bankruptcy.

28 November 2025 Antimonopoly Committee of Ukraine (AMKU) has made a decision to allow the transfer of an undisclosed mall to a consortium of Oschadbank and Ukreximbank. The document is believed to be related to Gulliver.

2 December 2025 Oschadbank announced that the shopping part of Gulliver will be open on 12 December, while the decisions about the office part 'will be made in the course of liquidation of reasons for the possible emergency situation – the consequences of willful damage and negligent treatment of engineering systems of the complex by the previous owner'.

== Accidents ==
In 2021 offices of investment swindler Serhiy Ostapchuk opened in Gulliver at floors 10, 11, 12 and 32. After the protest was gathered against Ostapchuk's business school, complex' security brutally dispersed it injuring ten people. After owners and police didn't react, 6 April public organizations 'Stop Corruption' (Стоп корупції), 'New Capital' (Нова столиця) and 'Traditions and Order' (Традиції і порядок) gathered a new protest.

== Gallery ==
Gulliver and Parus

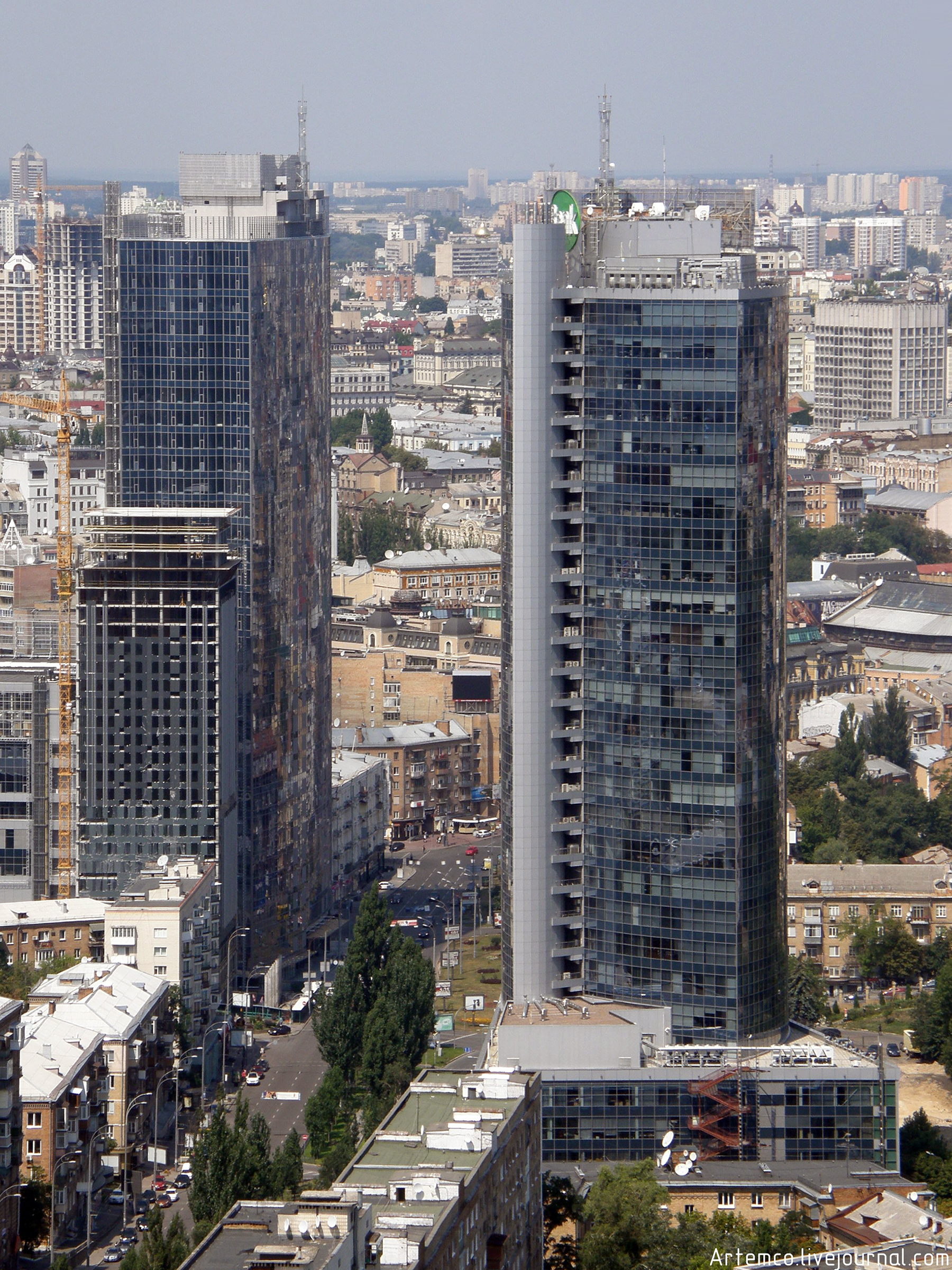
Gulliver, Parus and Aloft Kyiv (under construction)

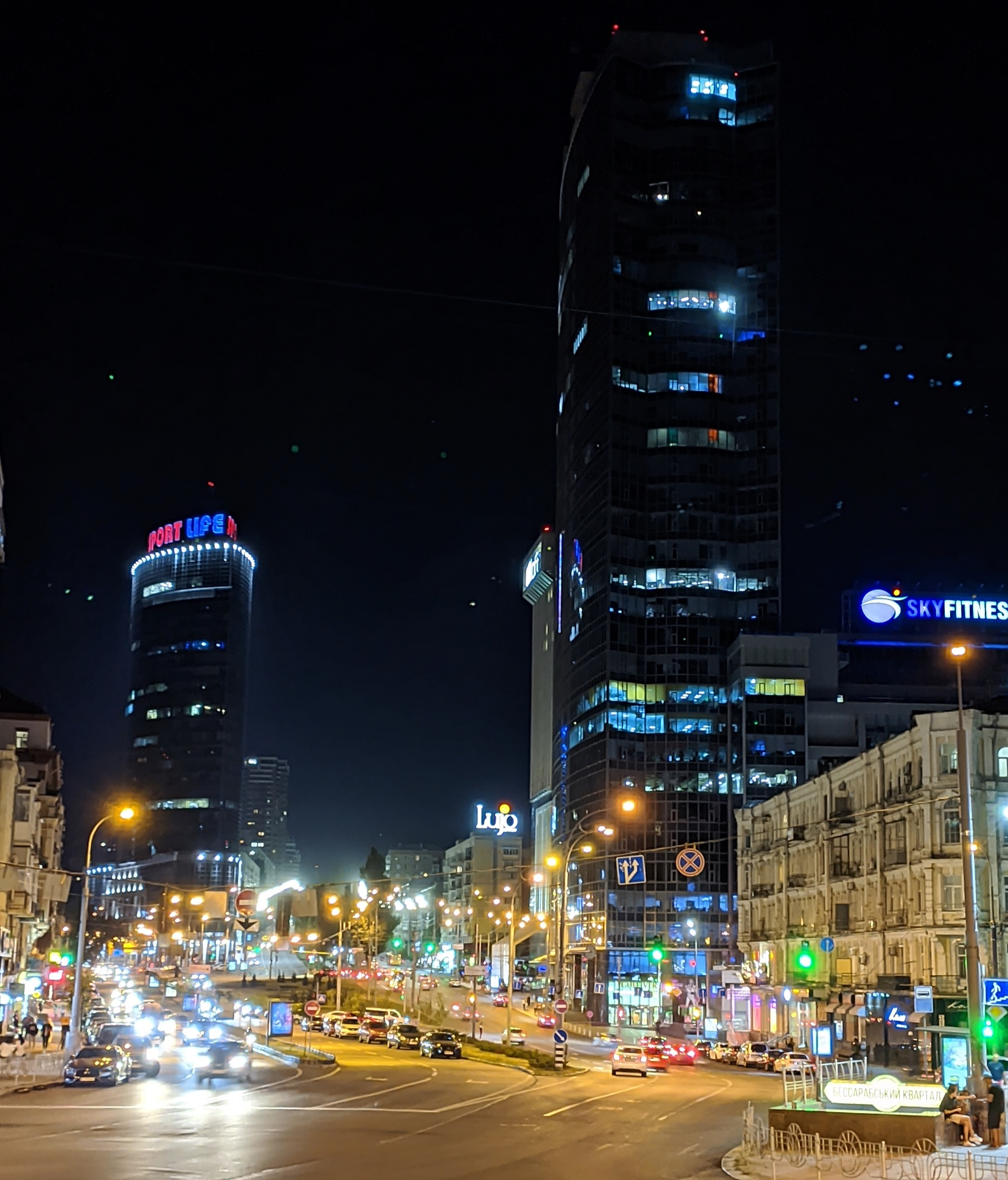
Gulliver and Parus at night

Gulliver at night

== See also ==
- List of tallest buildings in Europe

Records
Preceded by Parus Business Centre	Tallest building in Ukraine; 2012–2013	Succeeded by Klovski Descent 7A
Preceded by Parus Business Centre	Tallest building in Kyiv; 2012–2013	Succeeded by Klovski Descent 7A
