= 101 Tower (Kyiv) =

- 101 Tower in 2021

General information
- Status: Under reconstruction
- Type: Mixed-use
- Location: 57 Hetmana Pavla Skoropadskoho Street, Kyiv, Ukraine
- Coordinates: 50.43919035016632°N 30.496359645324347°E
- Construction started: April 2009
- Completed: May 2012
- Renovated: 2025–2026
- Owner: Valprym

Height
- Height: 116 metres (381 ft)

Technical details
- Floor count: 27
- Lifts/elevators: 10

Design and construction
- Architects: Oleksandr Koval; Ivan Ryabokon
- Architecture firm: Arkhitekturne Byuro A. Koval; Archimatika
- Developer: KAN Development
- Engineer: BIP-PM
- Main contractor: KAN Stroi
- Awards: CP Awards 2013

Website
- 101tower.com.ua

101 Tower is a 27-story high skyscraper in Kyiv, Ukraine, completed in 2012. The building was among the most prestigious office centers in Kyiv and included among its tenets the headquarters of Samsung in Ukraine and the visa department of the German Embassy.

In October 2022 the building was seriously damaged during Russian airstrikes against Kyiv during the Russian invasion of Ukraine and remained closed until 2026, when the reconstruction began.

== History ==
The original 34-floors-tall project has been made by the architectural bureau of Oleksandr Koval and was first presented at the meeting of Kyiv Architecture Department 19 September 2007. The project has been approved for further development.

The business center's construction began in April 2009. In October the project was modified by Archimatika's Ivan Riabokon, building's facade was simplified.

In 2010 KAN Development asked Ministry of Regional Development and Construction to approve a once again updated project, now lowered to 27 floors. The parking floors were planned to have a media facade.

In May 2011 first facade panels began to be installed. Instead of media facade the parking received the decorative glass and a big advertisement screen. In August the building was topped out. In November the building received the completion certificate, the cranes were dismantled in December. The construction work lasted until May 2012.

Following the end of construction KAN Development opened their headquarters at 26th and 25th floors, another six floors were rented Ukrainian branch of Samsung.

In December 2013 101 Tower won the annual CP Awards national real estate prize in the Business Centre category.

In January 2016 the GreenFuel W32A charge station was opened in the 101 Tower parking, therefore making it the first office building in Ukraine with its own EV charger.

When Russia invaded Ukraine in 2022 the building was badly damaged in an October missile attack. Owner of the KAN Development Igor Nikonov said that no one was hurt because the strike took place early in the morning, when the building was still closed, and if it was to happen a couple hours later the result would've been different. He also stated that the renovation would cost at least ten million dollars, but owners were still calculating the final cost so the repair work couldn't start immediately.

The building remained preserved until December 2025 when the preparations for renovation began. The work had started in March 2026.

== Ownership ==
In the late 2000s the two old buildings that were on the future skyscraper site were rented by the Eurozhytlogroup Company which is owned by Сур Rose Holding Limited based in Cyprus. It was reported that one of the beneficiaries of Eurozhytlogroup is Stepan Chernovetskyi, a son of the former mayor of Kyiv, Leonid Chernovetskyi.

In March 2020, it was announced that Сур Rose Holding Limited was being bought by Dragon Capital Investments Limited, also based in Cyprus.

== Accidents ==
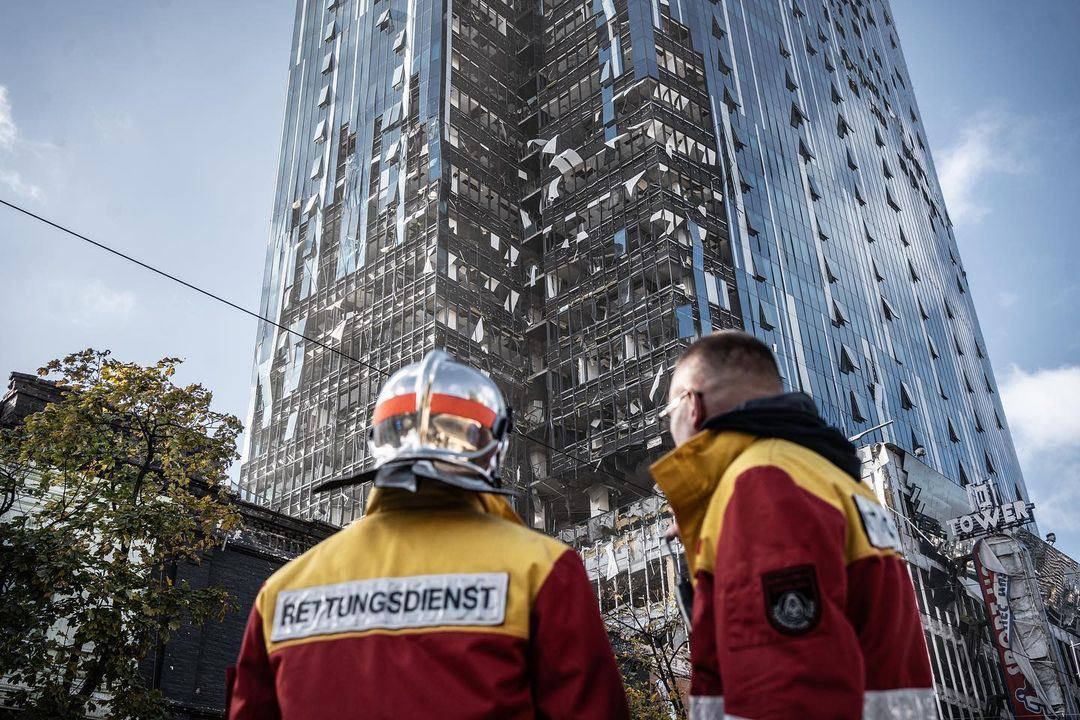
Aftermath of the October 2022 Russian bombing

On 25 June 2012, the balcony at the seventh floor of the building had caught fire due to short circuit in the fitness center. Firefighters arrived in 8 minutes and extinguished the fire in 15 minutes. No one was hurt, but fire destroyed the insulation.

During the 2022 Russian invasion of Ukraine the building suffered severe damage in air strikes in October, when Russia tried to destroy the nearby heating station. On 10 October, a missile fell behind the business center and the impact of its explosion seriously damaged building's facade and elevator shaft. Nobody was hurt inside the building. A week later, 17 October, Russia attacked Kyiv with kamikaze drones for the first time. A HESA Shahed 136 that was aiming for the same heating station has been shot down near the business center by police officers that were blocking the road because of the air raid warning.

== See also ==
- List of tallest buildings in Ukraine
