= Mirax =

Mirax may refer to:

- Mirax (medication)
- Mirax Group, Russian investment and development company
  - Mirax-Plaza Russia, a mixed use development in Moscow, Russia
  - Mirax-Plaza Ukraine, a 46-storey building under construction in Kyiv, Ukraine
- Mirax of Egypt, martyr
- Mirax Terrik, Star Wars Legends character
