= Ukraine and the World Bank =

Ukraine joined the World Bank in 1992, and over the 25 years since, the World Bank has committed $10 billion to over 70 projects in Ukraine. Ukraine is in a constituency with Armenia, Bosnia and Herzegovina, Bulgaria, Croatia, Cyprus, Georgia, Israel, Macedonia, Moldova, Montenegro, Romania, and the executive director of the constituency is Frank Heemskerk from the Netherlands.

== Ukraine Economy ==
Dating back to its constituency in the Soviet Union, Ukraine served as a crucial economic component with its membership, providing more than one-quarter of the Soviet Union's agricultural output. Since its independence in 1991, Ukraine began implementing reforms that liberalized prices and established a framework for widespread privatization. However, in part owing to controversy regarding the implementation of these reforms, the country has experienced a critical decline in its economic stability at numerous intervals, noting a 40% decline in economic output in 1999, compared to prior output in 1991. In 2009, the country experienced a 15% economic contraction, adding onto a plethora of additional economic challenges, including zero GDP growth in 2013, and an economic shrink of 6.8% in 2014. In 2014 the Ukrainian government said it needed $35 billion (£21 billion) to pay its bills over the next two years. At the urgency of outside institutions, such as the World Bank and the International Monetary Fund (IMF), Ukraine has begun to implement particular economic reforms, in the hopes of producing more buoyant economic activity.

== History ==
After the collapse of the Soviet Union, Ukraine obtained its independence in 1991. On September 3, 1992, Ukraine joined the World Bank. Ukraine's aspirations to social and economic reforms, with help from the World Bank, were always delayed due to difficulties in implementing reforms due to corruption and poor governance. The country's failure to properly implement policies due to corruption, made it difficult for the World Bank to carry out projects in Ukraine.

== The World Bank in Ukraine ==
=== Plans and Agreements ===
As a member in the World Bank, Ukraine holds 0.77% of the equities. In total, Ukraine has received approximately $7.4 billion from 50 loans from the World Bank, totaling an allocation of $10.1 billion. Furthermore, the World Bank also decided to provide additional assistance of $3 billion to Ukraine in March 2014. Currently, the World Bank and Ukraine, together, are realizing a total of 12 projects, aimed to improve infrastructure, road and traffic safety, power transmission, urban infrastructure development, and energy efficiency. Specifically, there are eight IBRD investments in place in Ukraine. The World Bank has placed particular attention to promote programs related to good governance and transparency in the Ukraine, as well as accountability in the public sector, and stability in the banking sector. Furthermore, the World Bank aims to reduce the cost of doing business, as well as promote more efficient methods of using public resources to provide critical public services. Current projects in Ukraine have also provided a focus on improving basic public services, which include water and sanitation, health, and social protection. In addition, the World Bank continues to promote the development of public infrastructure such as the power transmission networks and roads. The implementation of these institutional and structural reforms aim to provide impacting economic development of Ukraine.

=== Country Partnership Framework ===
The Country Partnership Framework for Ukraine aligns the goals necessary for the country's economic development. The development strategy includes goals aiming to provide fiscal consolidation, a moving flexible exchange rate, reforming energy tariffs, as well as enhancing transparency of public procurement. In 2014, the World Bank aligned $5.5 billion in two Development Policy Loan series, with seven new investment options aimed to bolster the private sector. The World Bank has also provided support for four budget support operations (MSDPL-1, MSDPL-2, FSDP -1, FSDPL-2) aimed at achieving good governance, accountability in the public sector, stability in the banking sector, reduction in the cost of doing business, and the provision of an efficient use of scarce public resources.

=== Effects ===
The World Bank's programs have had a notable impact on the economic status of Ukraine. Economic growth picked up to 3.4% in the first half of 2018, as well as positive growth in domestic trade, at about 5.8%. However, growth in manufacturing slowed by 3%, pointing to weaknesses in investor confidence. Household consumption continued to grow rapidly by 5.6% in the first quarter due to higher pensions and wages. The fiscal deficit remained on target at 2.3% of GDP in 2017. However, despite the on-target fiscal deficit, expenditures were up by 11.7%. The World Bank has noted a higher spending on social programs reaching a total 5.7% of the total GDP. Poverty remained at above pre-crisis levels in 2017. And unemployment remained at 9.7% from 10.1% in 2017.

=== Water ===
The World Bank's intervention in Ukraine has long been aimed at developing of Ukraine's infrastructure. Since late 2014 the World Bank has begun multiple projects in Ukraine aimed at improving roads, highways, municipal structures, waste management, and ultimately allowing Ukrainian markets to open up abroad. The cities of Ukraine all face problems with decades-old irrigation system that was inefficient in its use of energy as well as problematic in its dealing with waste. The International Bank for Reconstruction and Development (IBRD) gave Ukraine a $140 million loan, to assist it to deal with the decaying water and sewage pipelines, by replacing the older pumps with new efficient systems. The city of Kolomyia managed to install eight kilometers of new advanced water pipes and sewage disinfection system technologically, and became the first city in Ukraine to keep the water clean without the use of chlorine. In addition to developing new pipelines the World Bank has also loaned Ukraine $22.8 million for improvement of water pumps that will allow utility companies access to newer more efficient pumps which allow for deeper drilling for purer water.

=== Roads ===
Ukraine has many mountain roads, and as such tends to have many car accidents due to most drivers not being aware of how to drive on Ukraine's long mountain roads. Ukraine makes a great deal of capital from tourists who come to see the natural scenery from the mountains of Ukraine. The World Bank has begun projects to improve the safety of these mountain roads where many accidents take place. Ukraine has recently managed to widen roads, and install emergency sidetracks on the mountain highways, as well as increased warning signs to signal drivers to drive more cautiously along the mountains. According to the World Bank, the improvements of the roads of Ukraine will not only diminish the number of accidents, but also allow for easier transportation of goods throughout the country allowing the Ukrainian economy to grow. There has been a great deal of demand for the improvement of roads from private businesses to allow for the transportation of goods, the World Bank's involvement in safety improvement has also been an answer to the demands of many private businesses, particularity farmers who previously were limited in their capacity to transport goods. The development of roads allows for an increase of trade within Ukraine, and opens doors to exporters to gain access to trade abroad as well.

World Bank analysis indicated that the improvement of roads allows for the economic development within Ukraine. However, in order to further stimulate growth, the World Bank has worked directly with Ukrainian banks in order to provide long-term loans that will allow companies in Ukraine to begin exporting abroad. The World Bank has invested in Ukrainian exporters via the International Finance Corporation (IFC) to work with Ukreximbank, which is the trade bank of Ukraine in order to help Ukrainian exporters recover from the recession. The growth of the economy and benefits to exporters gave the World Bank incentive to further improve transport connectivity, road safety, and improve road network management in Ukraine, in order to allow for the growth of exporters throughout the country. However, the conflict in Crimea and Eastern Ukraine has resulted in the prevention of the completion of this project, as well as changes in planning
