= Sky Towers (Kyiv) =

Building in Kyiv, Ukraine

Coordinates: 50°26′55″N 30°28′37″E

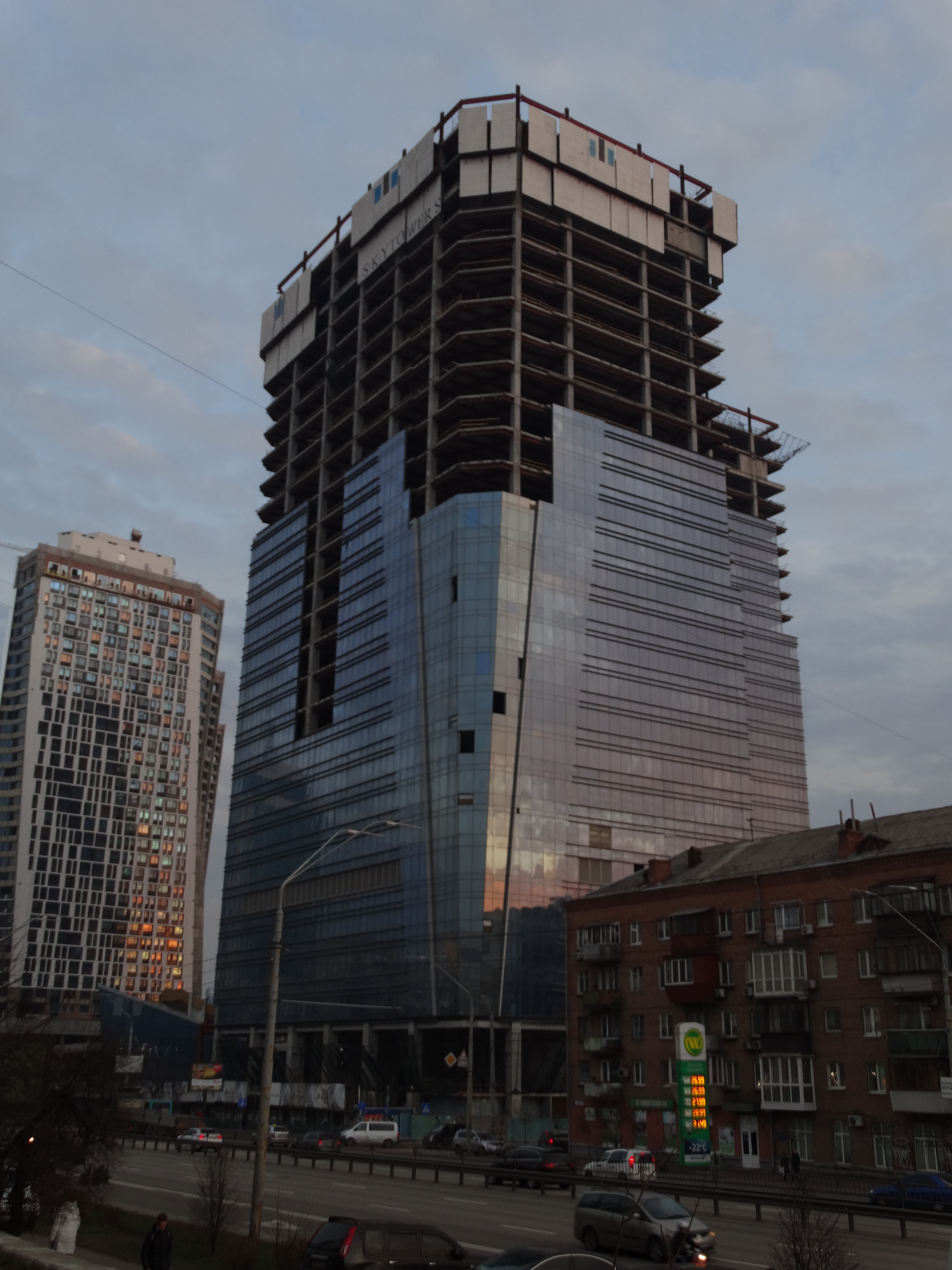
- Sky Towers construction site, Prospect Peremohy (now Prospect Beresteiskyi), February 2020
- Interactive map of the Sky Towers area
- Former names: ZAGS

General information
- Status: Under Construction (preparation works)
- Type: Mixed-use
- Location: Kyiv, Ukraine, 13 Prospect Beresteiskyi
- Construction started: January 2008; 18 years ago
- Construction stopped: January 2016; 10 years ago
- Cost: US$512.2 million
- Owner: TechInvestPostachPlus

Height
- Antenna spire: 220 m
- Roof: Tower A – 210 m (689 ft); Tower B – 165 m (541 ft)

Technical details
- Floor count: 34 and 47
- Lifts/elevators: 23

Design and construction
- Architect: Vitaliy Vasyagin
- Architecture firm: DLN Architects Limited; Vivas Architectural Bureau
- Developer: KDD Group
- Engineer: Volodymyr Kyrytsia
- Main contractor: Osnova-Solsif (2008–2010); Ant Yapi (2010–2016)

The Sky Towers multifunctional complex is a mixed-use building currently on hold in Kyiv, the capital of Ukraine. The project is designed to have two towers, ranging from 34 to 47 stories, and a two-story bank building. The gross area of the complex will be approximately 225,000 square meters. The project is also designed to have an eight-story underground parking area of approximately 51,630 square meters with 841 parking spaces. Around 1,594 square meters will be allocated for a retail area. Once completed, the 47-story office tower will be the tallest building in Ukraine.

== History ==
The project of building a skyscraper next to Kyiv's Central Civil Registry Office was originally proposed in 2005, named ZAGS after a Russian abbreviation for civil registry office. KDD Group (Kyiv Donbas Development) was an original developer for this project, while the official owner of the land was Ahentsiia Ofisnoho Budivnytstva (Office Construction Agency). The building was planned to be triangle-shaped, similar to Ministry of Transport building, that was on the opposite side of the street. Construction was planned to end in 2012, also there was a plan of opening a hotel in the tower.

Site cleanup began in March 2006. The final project was published in October, it was made by DLN bureau from Hong Kong and adapted for Ukraine by Vitaliy Vasyagin and his Vivas bureau. Later, the building was named 'Sky Towers'. In 2008 slurry wall were installed. Preparation for foundation pit began in 2009. In April 2010 construction of eight underground floors had started. The construction process went very slow, with pauses due to financial difficulties.

In October the Turkish company Ant Yapi became the project's main contractor. In October 2011 construction of zero floor began. 24 October the underground floors were finished and preparation for the first floor construction had started.

In May 2012 an American company, called Cimbrorum Holdings LLC bought the project, KDD Group took a credit from Ukreximbank to build the skyscraper. Also planned hotel inside the lower tower was cancelled.

In November the Tower A's first floor construction began, next month Tower B's zero floor was complete. In January 2013 the building rose above one floor, the construction went quickly. In May Tower A had ten floors and Tower B had seven. In June both towers reached 11 floors, which was a limit in Ant Yapi's contract, so construction was stopped for some time. In July the construction continued, since August both towers were being constructed concurrently. The building reached 15 floors in October and 20 in December. In January 2014 first glass was installed on facade of the Tower A.

After the revolution in Ukraine construction slightly slowed down. In March the building had 23 floors and was already taller than 100 meters. At the end of the month the building already had 25 floors. A glass facade was installed on Tower B, first escalators were set in the atrium. In April glass installation began on both towers. In the end of the month atrium's construction began, it was finished in May. Next month there were 27 floors ready and glass installation was ongoing. Next month construction of new floors was stopped, but the glass installation got faster. During July–August almost a half of the building already had glass installed.

2 August 2015 KDD Group, building's developer, went bankrupt, being unable to pay all the debts to Ukreximbank. For the rest of the year the work continued only on the facade and went very slow. 13 January 2016 the work on dismantling one of cranes began. By February both cranes were removed and the construction was put on hold.

Since 2017 there were plans to situate all the Kyiv City Administration in one building and the Sky Towers was one of the variants. In 2018 Kyiv Investment Agency's director Oleh Mistiuk stated, that they've reached the final stage in the negotiations about financing the building construction and need a contract from the government. However these plans didn't go any further.

In 2021 Ukreximbank decided to sell Sky Towers from OpenMarket auction for ₴7 billion however they failed. A second attempt at selling the unfinished skyscraper was made in 2023, this time in extremely adverse conditions of the ongoing full scale Russian invasion. The sale was to be conducted through a Dutch auction with a discount price starting from ₴5.53 billion and the lowest acceptable limit set at ₴827 million, the auction did not take place due to the lack of interested buyers. In 2024 an attempt was made to sell the building for ₴1.1 billion, ten participants applied but none of them paid ₴55 million guarantee fee, causing the auction to fail once again. In 2026 it was planned to sell the complex for ₴662 million but none of the six participants made a bid. The auction has been rescheduled to 8 April with price dropping to ₴562 million. Eventually the building has been sold for the same price to TechInvestPostachPlus. The company has been founded 10 months prior by Roman Chumak who until July 2025 had been a manager of Universal Company owned by a family of a corruption suspect Mykola Zlochevsky, former deputy of Party of Regions and the founder of now-defunct Burisma gas production company.

== Accidents and controversies ==
on, 16 September 2010, illegal workers from Turkey, Uzbekistan, Kyrgyzstan and Kazakhstan employed in the construction of the building were arrested.

On 17 February 2014, a 1.5 m long metal rod flew off the construction site and struck a car, piercing the roof and leaving one passenger with minor injuries.

== Gallery ==
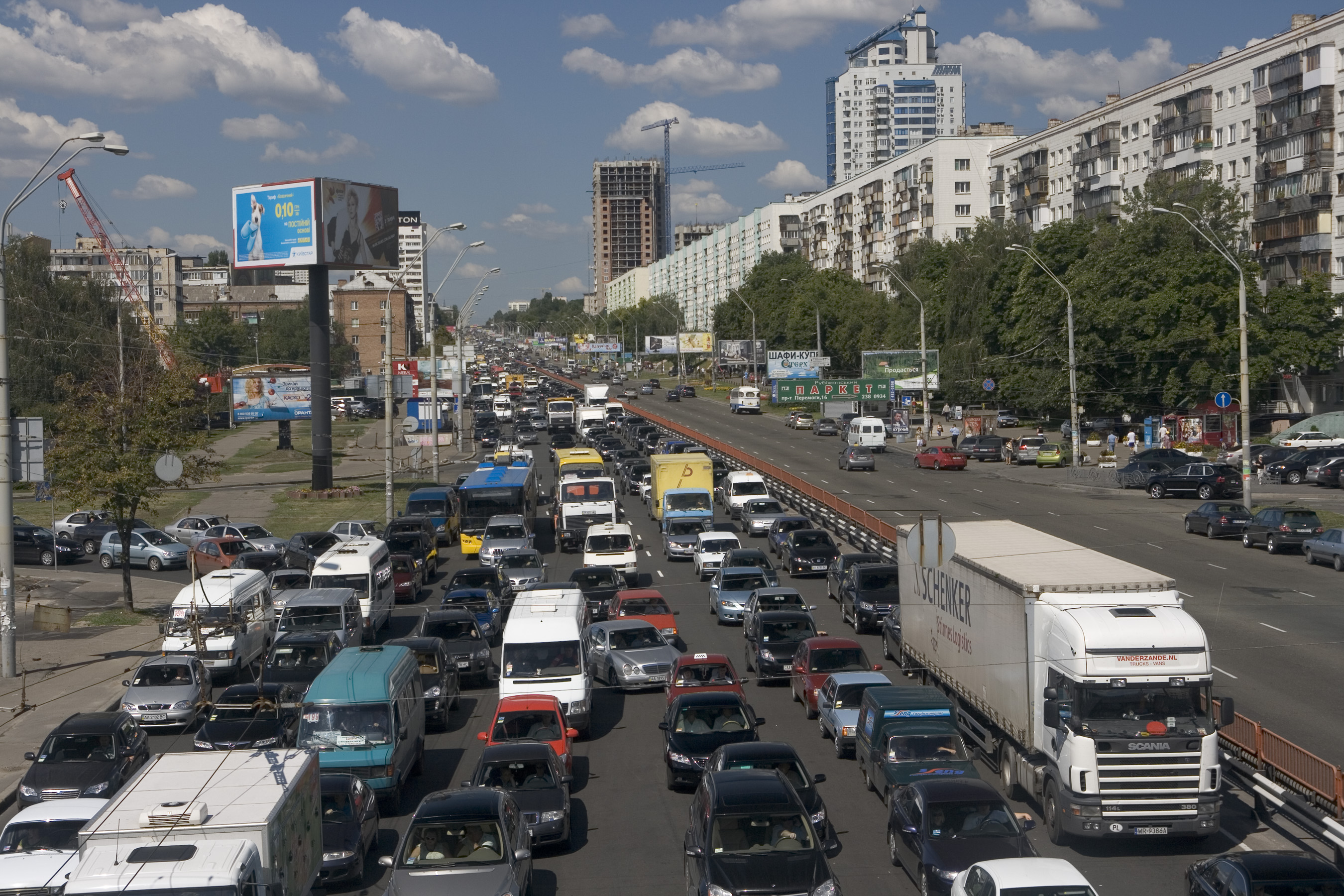
Early stage of construction in 2008 (left)

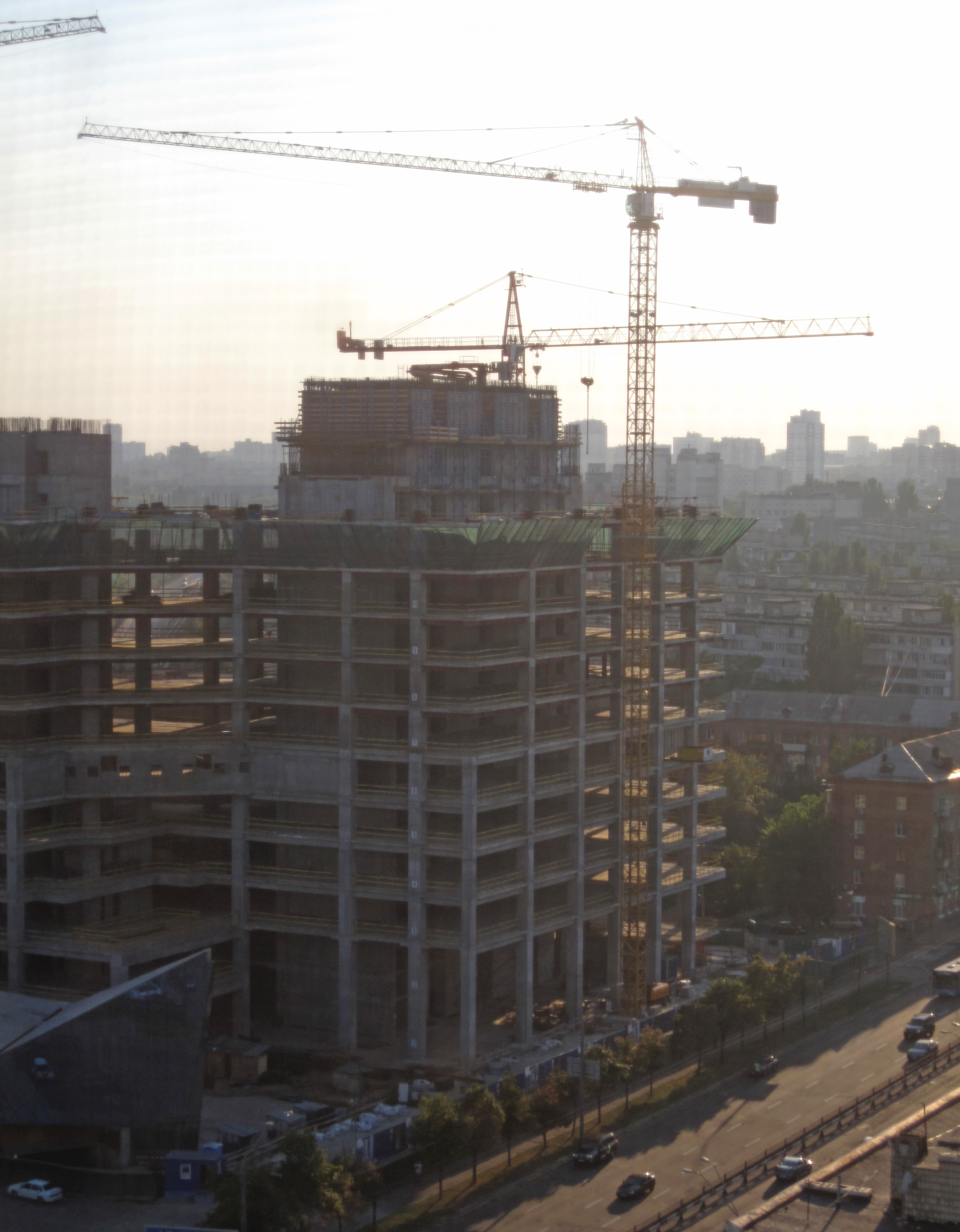
Construction in 2013

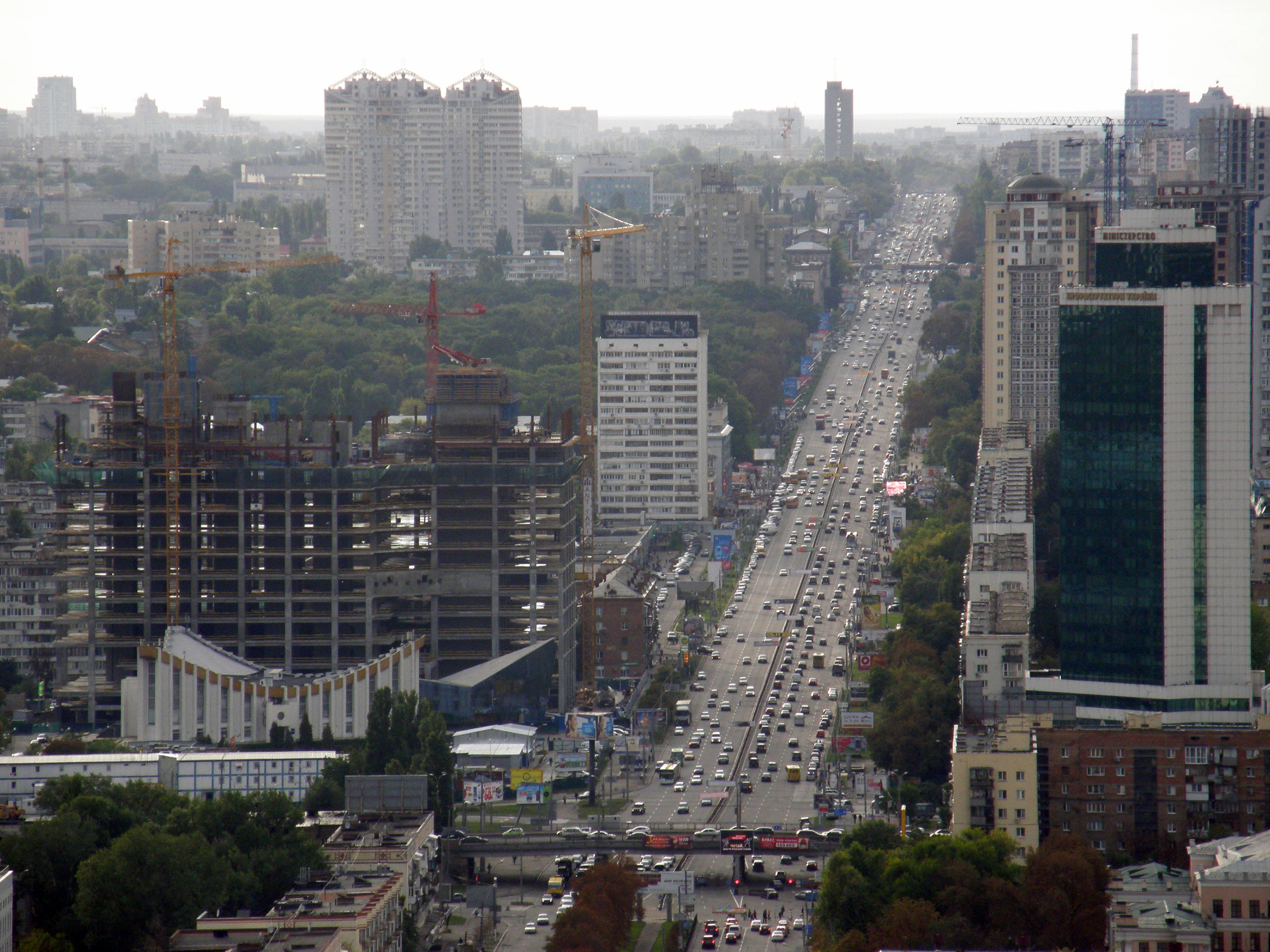
Construction in 2013 (left)

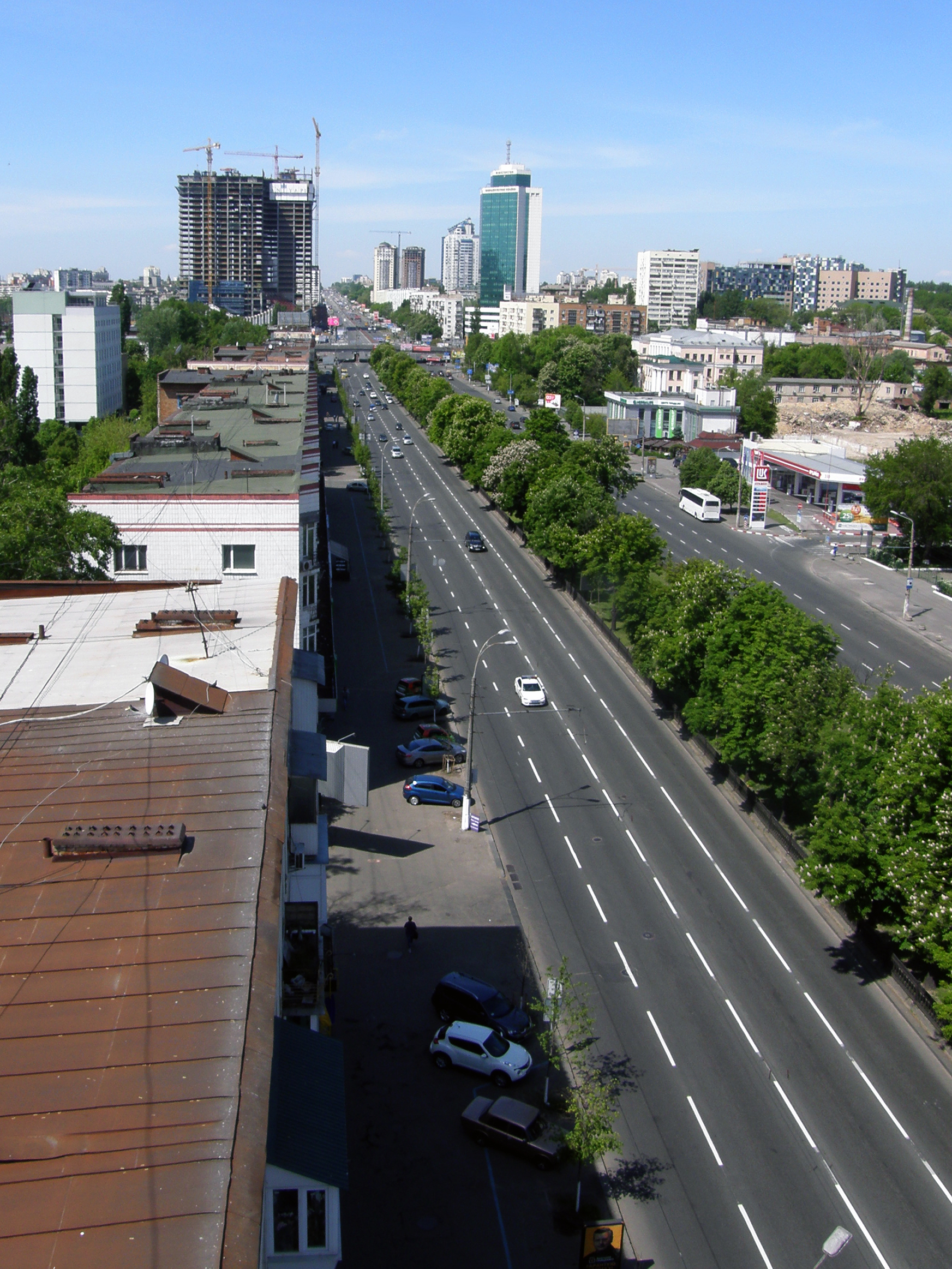
Construction in 2014 (left)

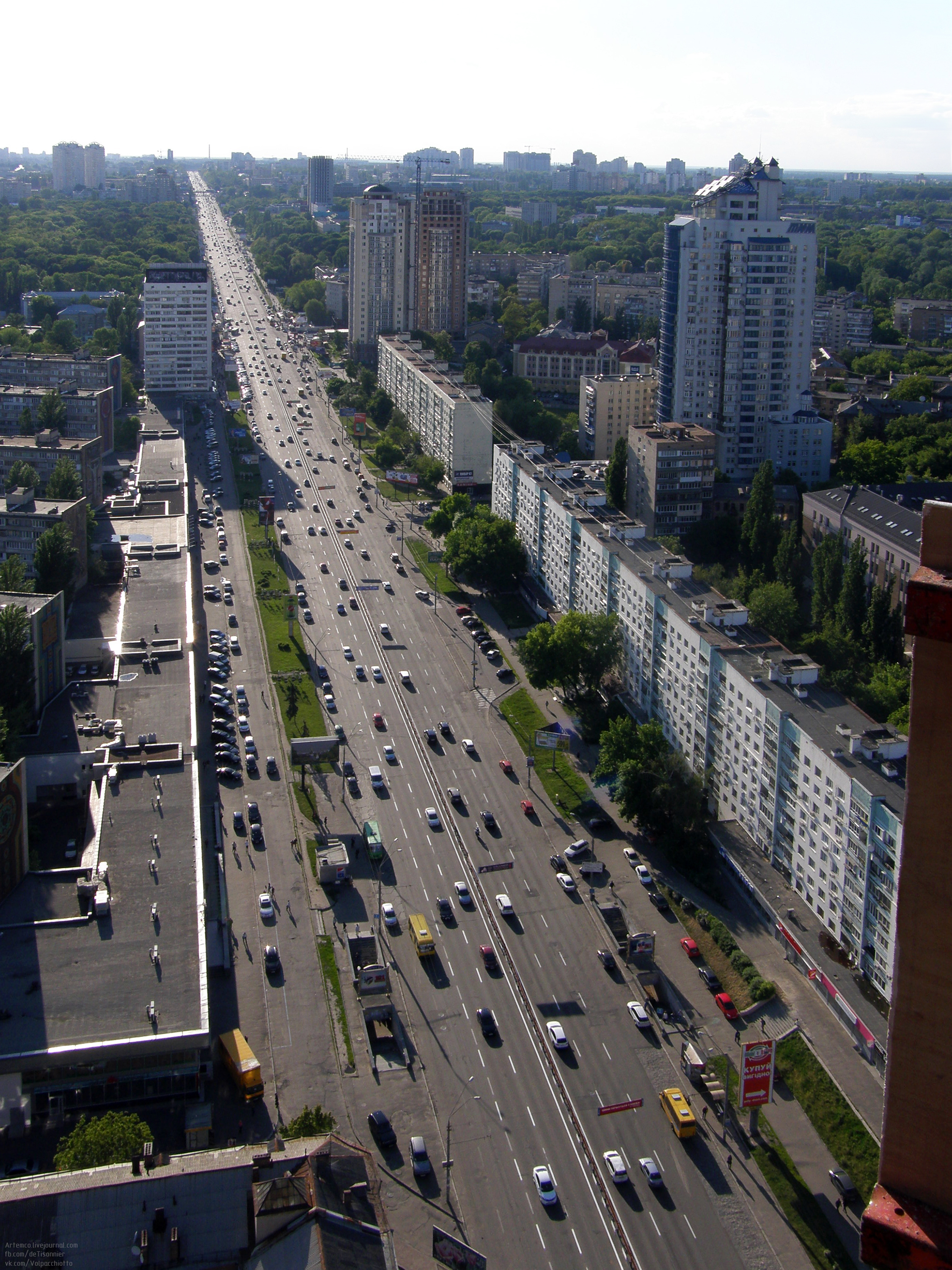
View from Tower A in 2014

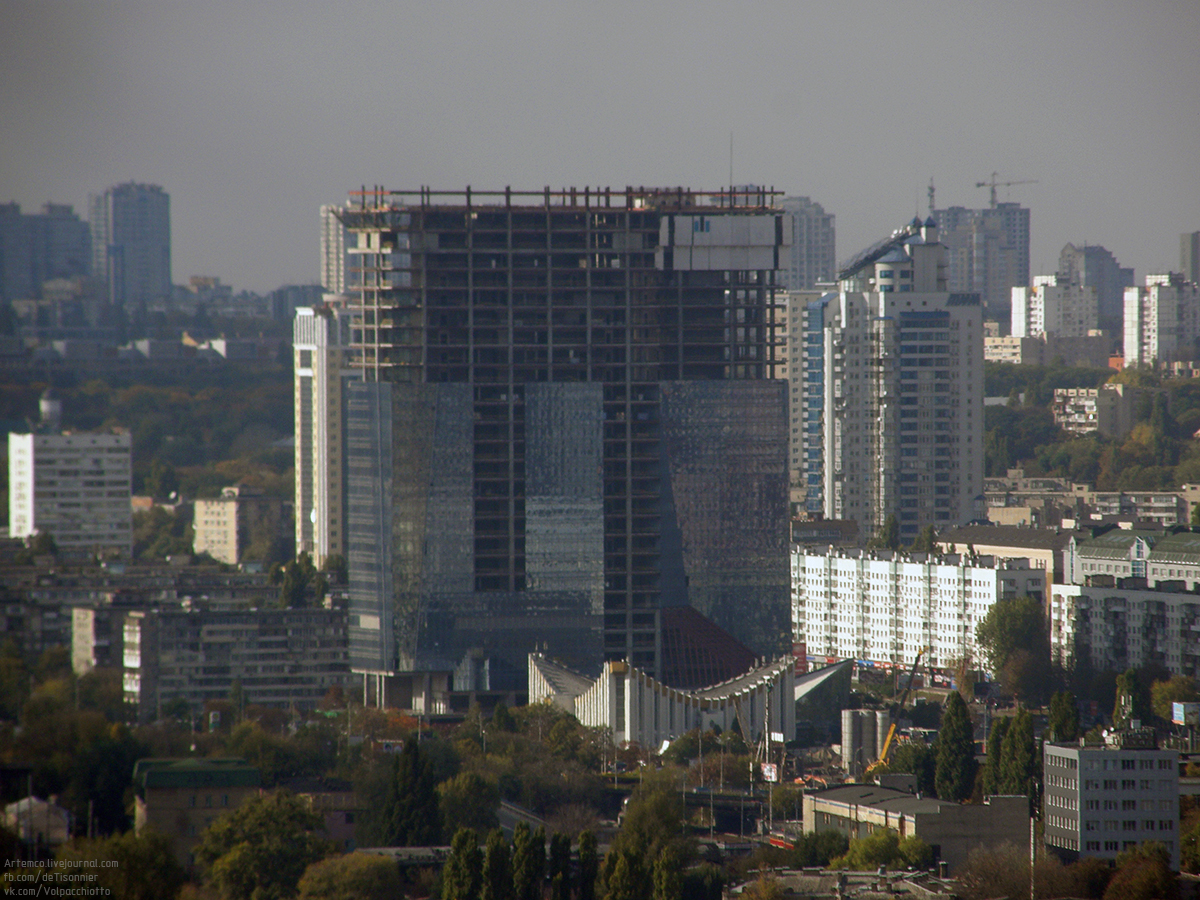
Complex without construction cranes in 2016

== See also ==
- List of tallest buildings in Ukraine
- List of tallest buildings in Europe
