= Klovskyi Descent 7 =

Skyscraper in Kyiv, Ukraine

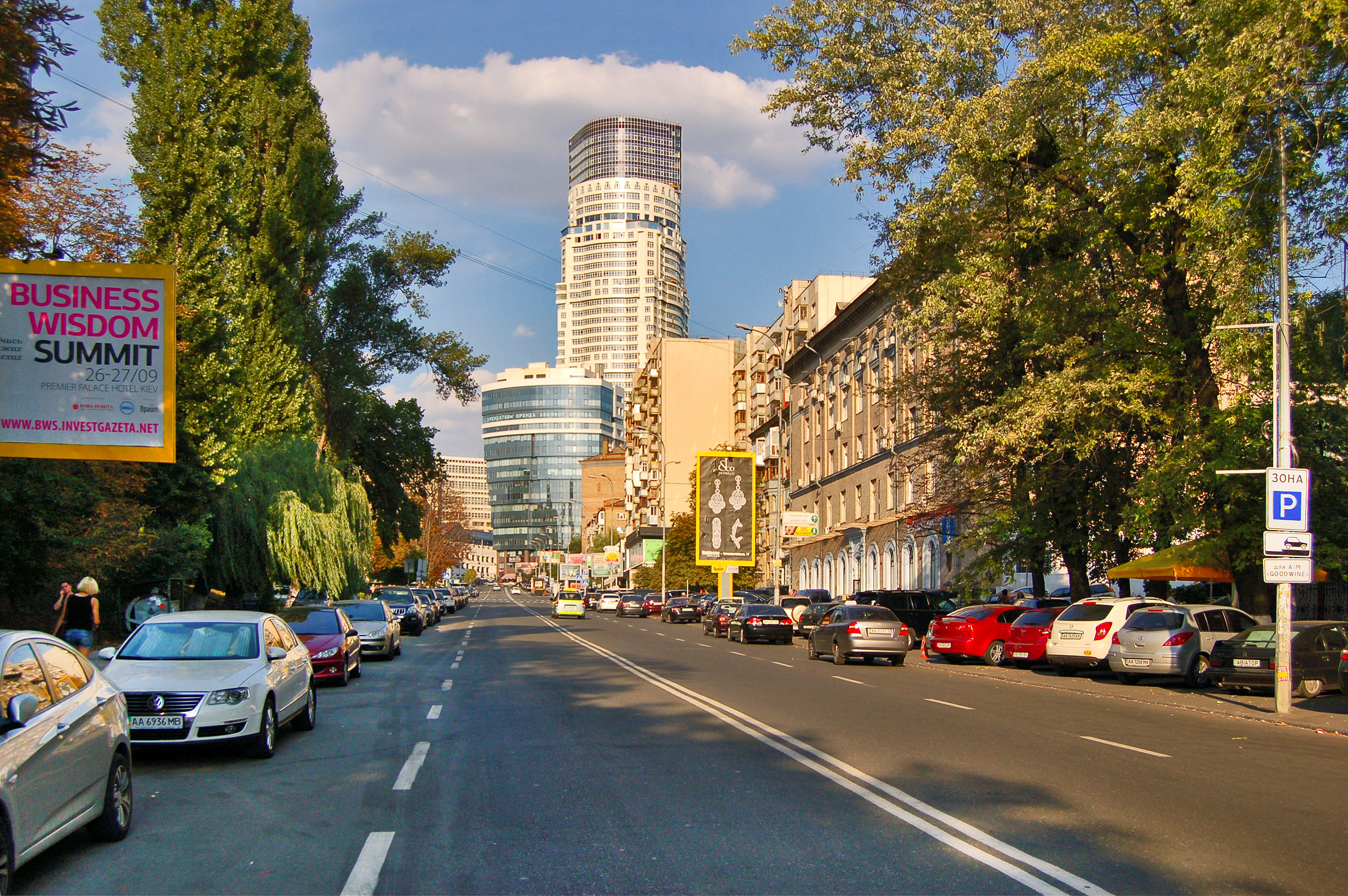
- Interactive map of the Klovskyi Descent 7 area
- Alternative names: Tower at the Klovskyi

General information
- Status: Completed
- Type: Residential
- Location: Klovskyi uzviz, 7a, Kyiv, 01032, Ukraine
- Coordinates: 50°26′18.7″N 30°32′21.1″E
- Construction started: 2008
- Completed: 2012
- Inaugurated: 2015

Height
- Roof: 168.0m (551.2ft)
- Top floor: 162.6m (553.6ft)

Technical details
- Floor count: 47

Design and construction
- Architect: Andriy Mazur
- Main contractor: Arsenal Factory

Website
- klovskiy7.com

Klovskyi Descent 7a (Ukrainian: Кловський узвіз, 7, romanized: Klovskyi uzviz, 7) is a skyscraper in Kyiv, Ukraine, the tallest in the country. Designed by Andriy Mazur, the building is 168 meters (551 feet) tall and has 47 floors. It is primarily a residential building but it also has commercial uses.

== Design and construction ==
The building was designed by Arkhitekturna Spilka and the studio of Serhiy Babushkin, who also conceived the Kyiv skyscrapers Parus Business Centre and Gulliver.

The tower has been criticized for its adverse effect on the panorama of Kyiv Pechersk Lavra, a UNESCO World Heritage Site.

Records
Preceded by Gulliver	Tallest building in Ukraine; 2013-present	Succeeded by none
Preceded by Gulliver	Tallest building in Kyiv; 2013-present	Succeeded by none
