= Parus (disambiguation) =

Parus or PARUS may refer to:

- Parus, a genus of birds
- Parus (satellite), a Soviet/Russian satellite family
- PARUS (Taiwanese satellite family), a Taiwanese satellite family
- Parus Business Centre, a business center in Kyiv
- Paros, a Greek island also transliterated as Parus
