= Valeriy Kovtun =

Ukrainian pedagogue and editor

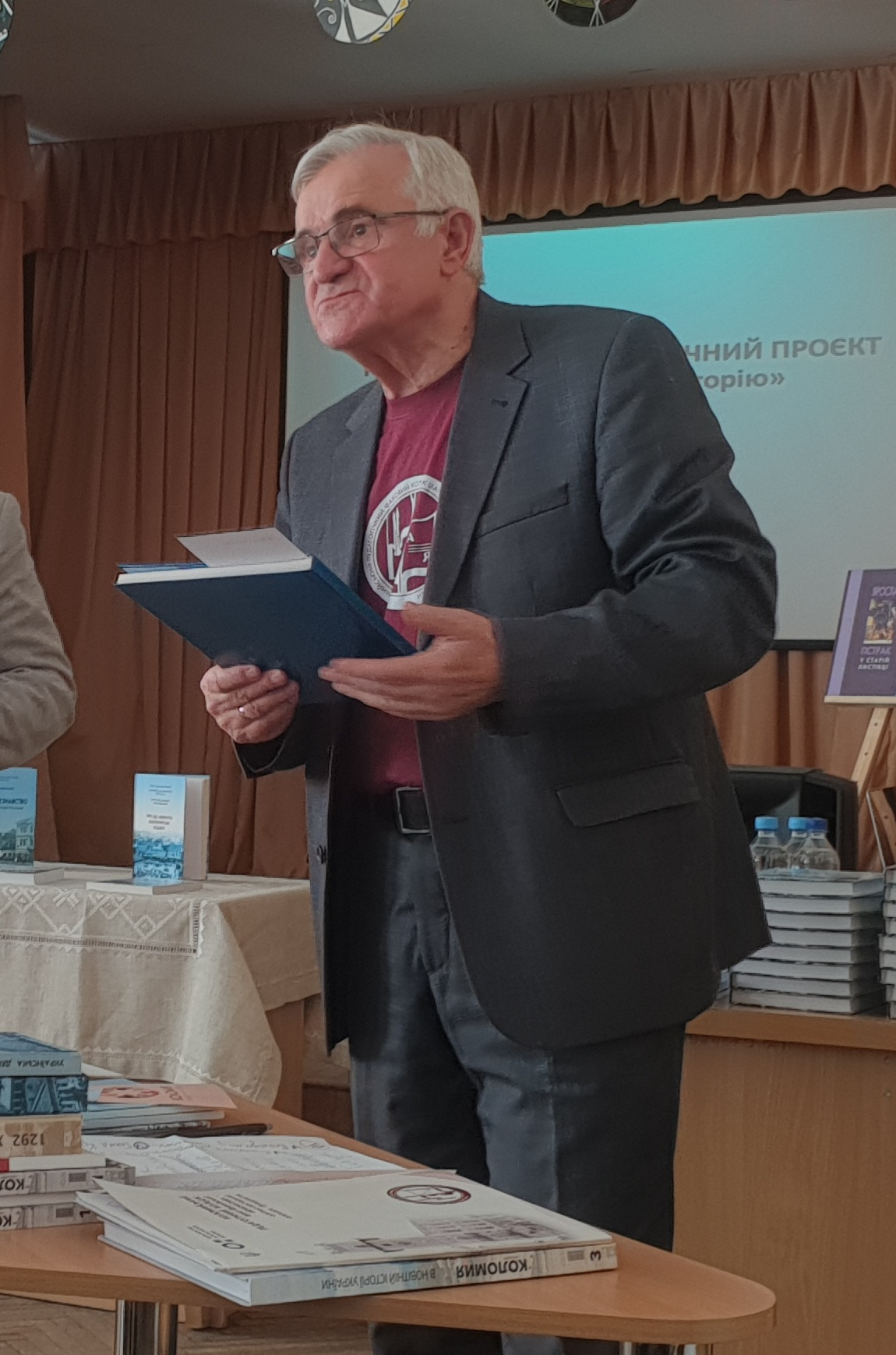
- Born: Valeriy Ivanovych Kovtun; June 28, 1948 (age 78); Novoselytsia, Chernivtsi oblast, Ukrainian SSR, USSR
- Citizenship: Soviet Union; Ukraine
- Education: Chernivtsi University (1971)
- Occupations: Community activist, college ex-director, editor, local historian, teacher
- Years active: 1975 – now
- Awards: (2015)

Valeriy Ivanovych Kovtun (Ukrainian: Валерій Іванович Ковтун; born June 28, 1948) is a pedagogical college ex-director in Kolomyia (2001–2025), educator, deltiologist, local historian and editor. He is a member of National Union of Journalists of Ukraine since 2022 and also National Union of Local Historians of Ukraine since 2009.

== Biography ==
Valeriy Kovtun was born on June 28, 1948, in the city of Novoselytsia in Chernivtsi region. In 1966, he finished the local secondary school No. 3. Then he graduated from Chernivtsi University with a degree in mathematics (1971), and since then he has been in Kolomyia. He began his career as a teacher at the local boarding school.

Since 1975, he began his career in a pedagogical college. Since 1977, he has been the deputy director, and from December 2001 to August 2025 he was the director of the pedagogical college. Currently, he is an advisor to the director on issues of development of the educational institution.

In 1978, he began to get acquainted with local history of Kolomyia and in-depth study of the history of Ukraine. In 2000, he began to engage in publishing and cultural projects. Over the years of Valeriy Kovtun's activity, many projects were launched, among them "Ukrainian Art in an Old Postcard", "Kolomiya in the World of Arts", "Let's Study Our History", "Kolomiya Library", "Kolomiya in the Modern History of Ukraine", "Museum of the Kolomyia Book and Ukrainian Language".

In the year of the 80th anniversary of the UPA in Precarpathia, as a journalist, he prepared 12 articles for the newspaper "Free Voice" about the UPA military based on materials from books from the local museum of book.

In 2010, Valeriy Kovtun revived the Sich holidays in Kolomyia near the memorial plaque to Kyrylo Tryliovskyi, the founder of the Sich-Rifle movement in the Hutsul region and Pokuttia.

On September 30, 2010, at the initiative of Valeriy Kovtun, a commemorative tablet with a bas-relief of Kyrylo Tryliovskyi was opened. In March 2014, he took part in organizing the cultural project "The Word of the Kobzar", in which 872 readers from the college and its guests recited poems by Taras Shevchenko for 200 days. This achievement was entered in the Book of Records of Ukraine In August 2016, on the occasion of the 150th anniversary of printing, a monument to the first printers of Kolomyia - the Bilous' brothers. In June 2019, together with Ulyana Mandrusyak, he became the author of the project for installing a commemorative plaque to Mykola Vereshchynskyi. In November 2022, he initiated the installation of a memorial plaque to the famous teacher Myroslav Stelmakhovych.

On September 30, 2018, he created the Museum of the Book in Kolomyia, which presents literature published in Kolomyia from 1864 to the present day. In June 2019, the Museum of the Ukrainian Language opened within the walls of the Museum of the Book with the assistance of Valeriy Kovtun.

In 2010, he published the book "The Golden Age of Postcards in Kolomyia". In September 2024, he presented the book "Sich Traditions in Kolomyia".

In April 2025, a presentation of historical and cultural projects and the album "City of Publishing Traditions" took place in Kolomyia on the occasion of the 25th anniversary of his publishing activity. In November, he celebrated half a century of his pedagogical activity and presented a new publication "Town that unites us".

== Awards and honors ==
- Member 3rd Class of the Order of Merit (2015)
- Honorary Citizen of Kolomyia (2019)
- Honored Educator of Ukraine (2009)
- Honored Local Historian of Ukraine (2018)
- Excellent Teacher of Public Education of the Ukrainian SSR (1986)
- Excellent Educationist of Ukraine (2000)
- Medal "Builder of Ukraine" (2007)
- Medal "For Sacrifice and Love for Ukraine" (2018)
