= Parus Hotel, Dnipro =

Unfinished hotel in Dnipro, Ukraine

Parus Hotel
- Парус Готель
- The hotel in 2014
- Interactive map of the Parus Hotel area

General information
- Status: Awaiting demolition
- Type: Hotel
- Location: Dnipro, Ukraine, Sicheslav Embankment Street
- Coordinates: 48°28′38″N 35°02′10″E
- Construction started: 1975
- Construction stopped: 1995

Height
- Height: 114 metres (374 ft)

Technical details
- Size: 188,991 square metres (2,034,280 sq ft)
- Floor count: 32
- Lifts/elevators: 17
- Grounds: 50,000 square metres (540,000 sq ft)

Design and construction
- Architect: Vladimir Zuyev

Other information
- Number of rooms: 589

The Parus Hotel (Ukrainian: Парус Готель) is an unfinished 20th-century hotel in the city of Dnipro, Ukraine. The building sits on the embankment of the Dnieper River. It is one of the few skyscrapers built during the Ukrainian SSR, and ranks as the 15th tallest building in the country.

== Design ==
The Y-shaped structure is 114 metres (374 ft) tall, has 32 stories. They take up 28 stories in a high-rise section and a total of 188,991 square metres (2,034,280 sq ft) in the base of two stylobates. In spite of all these measurements, the rooms have a ceiling height of 2.5 metres (8 ft 2 in). There were 589 hotel rooms with 996 seats in the high-rise section. It consisted of a 600-seat restaurant, a 200-seat café, a banquet hall for 60, a bar for 50, billiard rooms, a 120-seat conference hall, a 450-seat concert hall, exhibition halls, a hair salon, a 100-seat dining room, a laundry, a drying department, a carpentry shop, and much more are all included in the project. A swimming pool, dock, parking, and its own substation were also planned.

== History ==
The Communist Party of Ukraine Central Committee came up with the proposal to construct a hotel in Dnepropetrovsk (now Dnipro) during the early part of the 1970s. The hotel would serve as a venue for party congresses and seminars in addition to serving as a lodging for visitors visiting historical sites. Leonid Ilyich Brezhnev helped put the proposal into action. The structure was also intended to represent the might of the Soviet Union. The Dnieper's bank was chosen as the location for the building of a 29-story hotel-skyscraper.

The State Design Institute Dneprograzhdanproekt team started putting the concept into practice in 1972 when they created a project for the Parus Hotel's complex of buildings and structures. Vladimir Zuyev oversaw the project together with a group of architects that included B. Mitgauz, V. Tovstik, and I. Bogdanov. The hotel complex proposal includes tourist destinations with a complex of medical and repair services, sports and recreation, and retail and entertainment.

The project was approved for 25 million rubles, but only somewhat less than 10 million were provided by Moscow; the remaining funds had to be obtained through patronage support to hire people at local firms. Under Brezhnev's personal protection, funds from Moscow were disbursed, the project was moved to the balance of the Ukrainian SSR, and construction was approved in 1974.

The irrigation of the sandy coast was finished in 1974, and construction and installation work started in 1975. The structure's framework was constructed throughout the next three years. It was predicted that construction would be finished in 1979. The Ukrainian Ministry of Public Utilities initially provided funding for the building project. Many of the projects were completed at no cost by neighborhood businesses. But soon Kyiv, like Moscow, disowned the hotel and gave it over to the Dnipropetrovsk City Council, who was unable to manage the building financially.

Although the facility had disastrously low funding in the early part of the 1980s, the construction halted between 1984 and 1987 due to insufficient funds. Even though the development was moving extremely slowly by 1995, several windows and doors had already been largely fitted. Experts predicted that six months of arduous labor were still ahead. Both the construction and the funding halted altogether when the structure was almost eighty percent complete.

The hotel appeared to come to life in 2000, when the hotel was painted in the hues of white, green, and yellow. PrivatBank used the structure to display its emblem as a means of advertisement. The 32-story hotel has now been converted into a billboard for the business. It was decided to build a life-size space technology museum close to the hotel in the early 2000s. However, as reality has proven, this project can no longer be carried out.

At the XII session of the Dnipro City Council on 8 December 2004, it was resolved to determine the fate of the doomed long-term development project. As a result, the deputies agreed to hold an auction on 4 July 2005, to privatize the Parus Hotel complex. Rombus-Privat indicated their willingness to buy the construction. A new design created by Vyacheslav Tovstikov, the head of the Dneprograzhdanproekt Institute, and architect Andrey Pashenko of Kyiv was unveiled to the public in 2006. The Kyiv firm requests a five-year development delay in January 2010. As per the deal, purchasers are now required to finish the hotel by 2015.

A massive Ukrainian coat of arms was painted on the hotel in 2014. The Central Economic Court of Appeal's ruling to end the purchase and selling agreement between the Dnipro City Council and the business Rombus-Privat became effective on 18 November 2021. Thus, the Parus Hotel was given back to the city. The hotel building will be demolished by the city officials, who have already painted over the coat of arms. The area where the structure is located has been drastically rearranged.

== Gallery ==
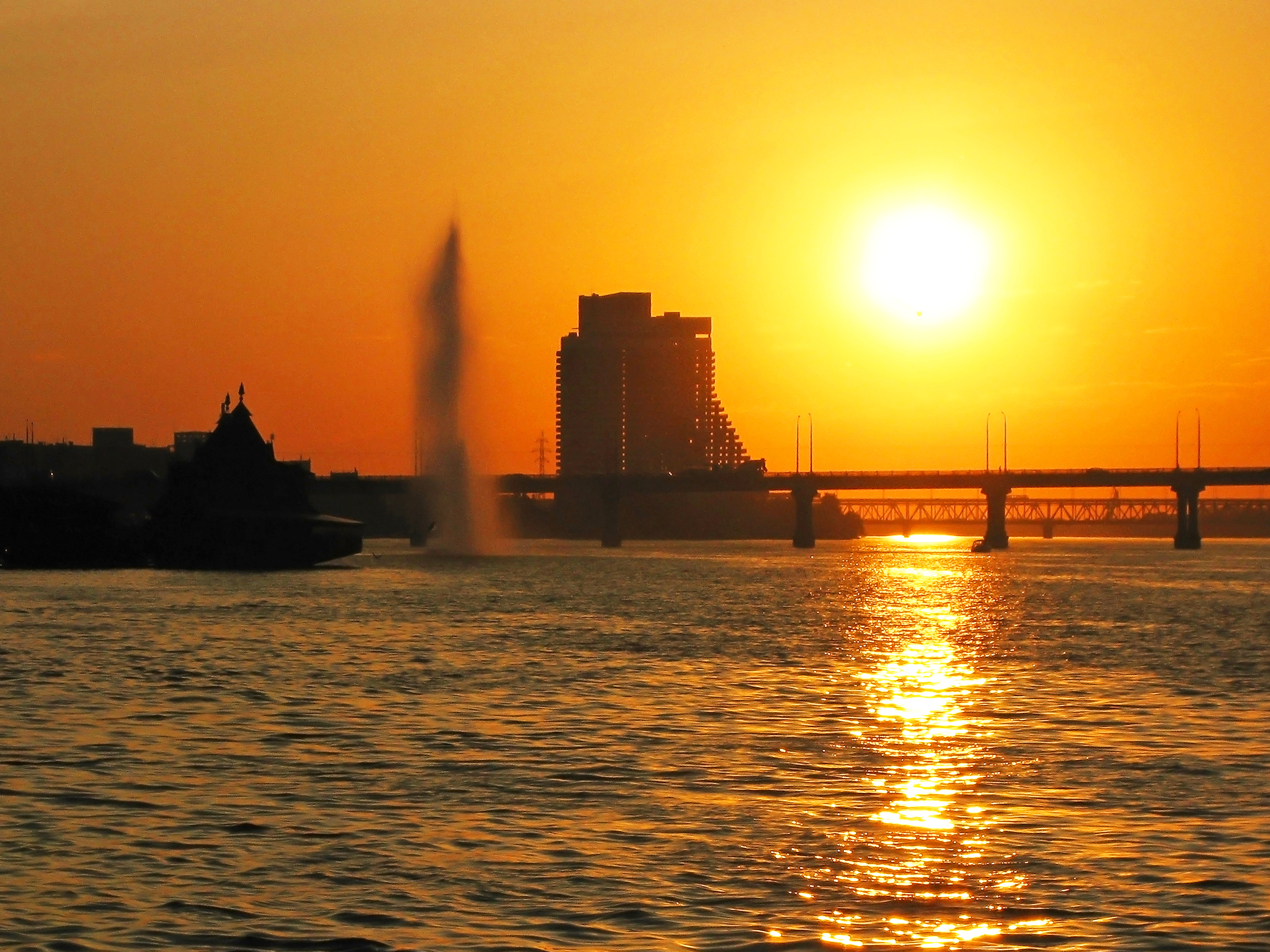
The hotel in 2008

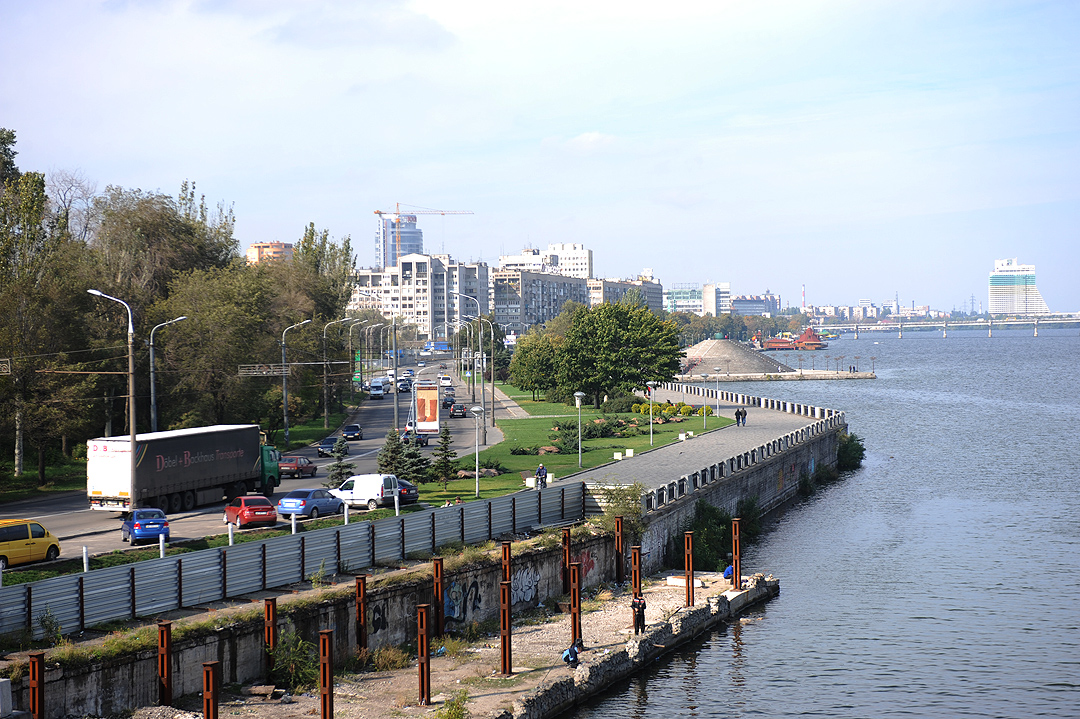
The hotel in 2009

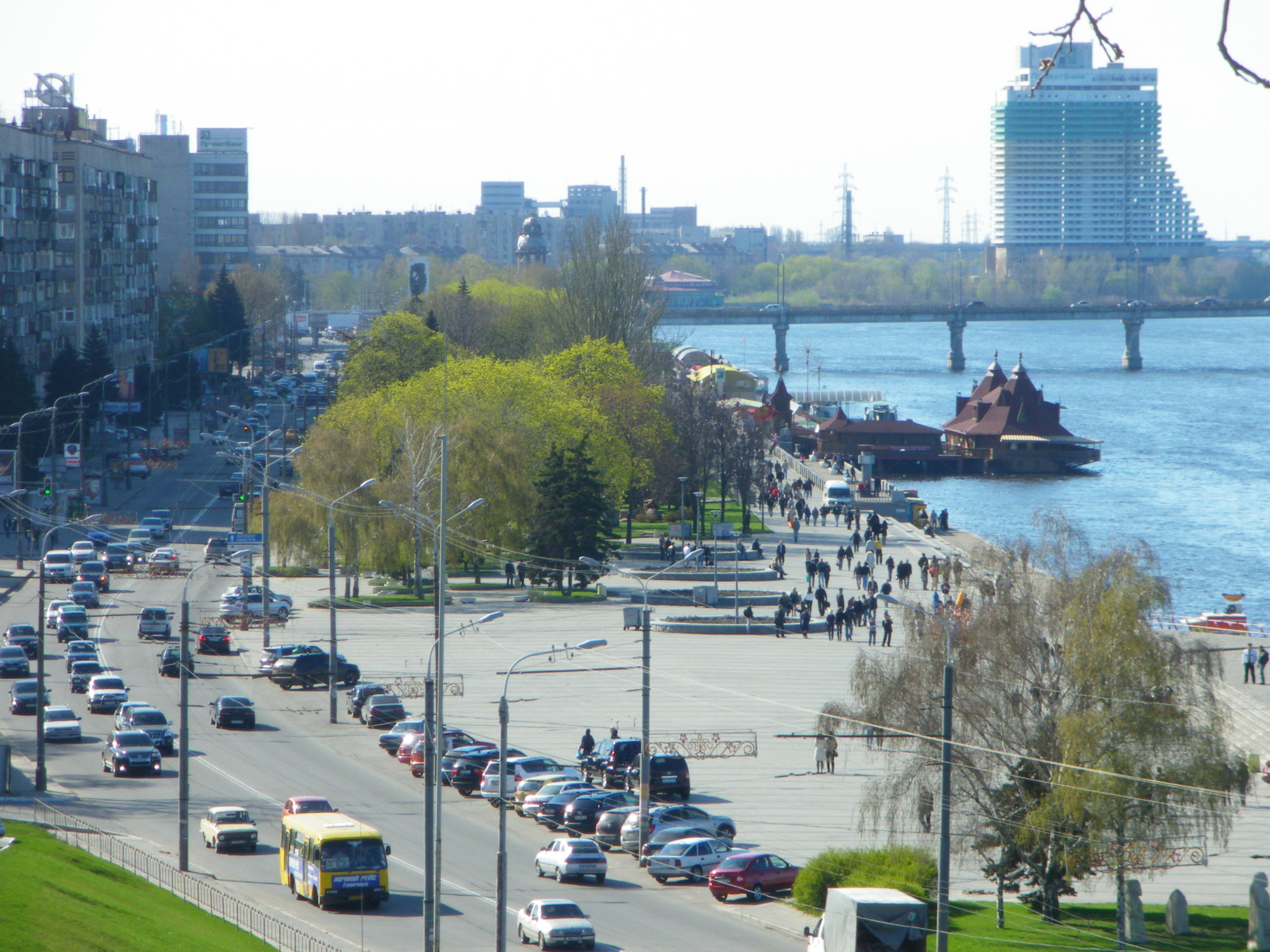
The hotel in 2010

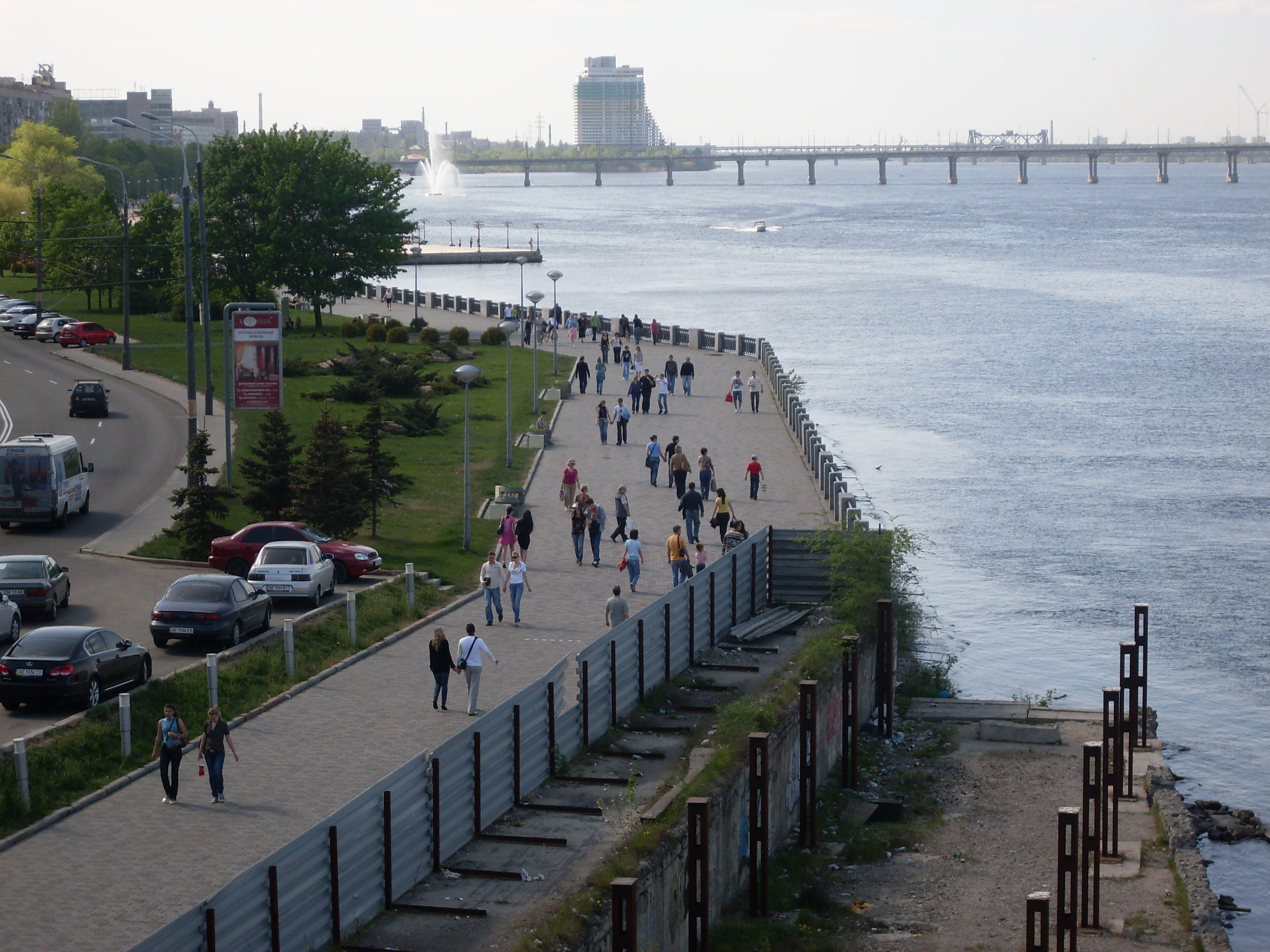
The hotel in 2014

== See also ==
- Skyscrapers of Ukraine
- List of tallest buildings in Ukraine
