= Victor Polishchuk =

Ukrainian businessman (born 1976)

- Born: 15 August 1976 (age 48); Kirovohrad Oblast, Ukrainian SSR, Soviet Union
- Occupation: Businessman

Viktor Stepanovich Polishchuk (Ukrainian: Віктор Степанович Поліщук, born August 15, 1976, Peregonivka village, Golovanivskyi district, Kirovohrad region, Ukrainian SSR) is a Ukrainian oligarch. The owner of the electronics chains "Technopolis" and "Eldorado", BC "Gulliver" in Kyiv, "Bank Mykhailivskyi", construction companies.

Polishchuk also owns the "Gulliver" retail and office center in Kyiv, and has been involved in real estate development.

== Biography ==
He was born on August 15, 1976, in Kirovohrad Oblast.

Graduated from the Kyiv Technological Institute of the Food Industry (now the National University of Food Technologies) majoring in heat engineering. At the same university, he received a second higher education in the specialty "economist".

In 2025, the Ukrainian government imposed sanctions against Polishchuk.
