= Igor Nikonov =

Nikonov Igor
- Born: July 20, 1964 (age 62); Tashkent, Uzbekistan
- Education: Petersburg State Universities of the nobles received (1986)
- Title: Entrepreneur, founder of the company KAN Development and Educational Institutions A +
- Spouse: Ivanna Nikonova
- Children: 10 children
- Awards: Honored Builder of Ukraine by Presidential Edict (2014)

Igor Nikonov (born July 20, 1964, Tashkent, Uzbekistan) – Ukrainian businessman, stockholder, the head of the Kyiv City State Administration of Vitaliy Klychko, the first deputy of the KCSA head in 2014–2015. In 2001 he founded the development company KAN Development. In 2012, he founded private Educational Institutions A +.

== Biography ==
Born July 20, 1964, in Tashkent, the Uzbek SSR in the family of the military serviceman.

In 1966, the family moved to the city of Aleksandria, Kirovohrad region.

In 1986, he graduated from the Leningrad Institute of Railway Transport Engineers. Specialty: civil engineer. According to the postgraduate work assignment was sent to "Kievmetrostroy", where being a student has entered the labor force as a shaftman.

In the 1990s, worked in various gas projects. In particular, in the corporation "Republic". Served as a commercial director of "Intergas" company.

== Public activity ==
On June 6, 2014, Igor Nikonov was appointed the head of the advisors group to the Kiev mayor Vitaliy Klychko.

From July 22, 2014, to December 7, 2015, he is the first deputy of the KCSA head Vitaliy Klychko. He coordinated three areas: economy, finance and transport.

Received on the hold position, salary was transferred to charity.

On August 20, 2014, the Cabinet of Ministers awarded the third rank of a civil servant to him.

Since September 2025 — Head of the Committee on Construction and Infrastructure at the Council of Entrepreneurs under the Office of the President of Ukraine.

== Professional activity ==
In 2001, he founded the company "KAN Development". Nowadays "KAN Development" is a real estate development company that is at the head of partner enterprises group involved in the delivery of real estate projects of various scales and complexity levels. KAN construction portfolio includes: shopping and entertainment centers Ocean Plaza, Respublika Park, IQ Business Center and 101 Tower. Residential complexes Tetris Hall, Comfort Town, Fayna Town, Respublika. KAN Development has created more than 3 million square meters of residential and commercial real estate.

2012 – created a network of educational institutions A +. This is the largest private network of educational institutions in the capital, located on the territory of KAN Development residential complexes. It includes 10 institutions where 2,000 children study. Among them: Academy Ecoland, Kindergarten A +, Academy of Sports A +, Academy of Primary Education A + with in-depth study of foreign languages, Gymnasium A +, Respublika Kids, etc.

Since the end of 2015, he is the Honorary President of the company.

"KAN Development" was recognized at the Developer of the Year Award more than 10 times (including Choice of 2015, Choice of 2016, CP Awards, EEA Real Estate Awards, IBuild Award etc.). The company's projects have been recognized by professional communities at the national and international level more than 20 times (including MAPIC Awards, European Property Awards etc.).

The name of Igor Nikonov has repeatedly appeared in informal discussions of candidates for the post of Prime Minister and Minister of Economy and Development of Ukraine. Igor Nikonov did not confirm his readiness to head the Government.

== State ==
Igor Nikonov is among the richest people in Ukraine:

- 2021 – participant in the ranking of the 100 richest people in Ukraine according to Focus magazine (№ 97 on the list, $ 145 million).
- 2020 – participant in the ranking of the 100 richest people in Ukraine according to Focus magazine (№ 66 on the list, $ 125 million).
- 2019 – participant in the ranking of the 100 richest people in Ukraine according to Focus magazine (№ 73 on the list, $ 110 million).
- 2018 – participant in the ranking of the 100 richest people in Ukraine according to Focus magazine (№ 53 on the list, $ 131 million).
- 2016 – participant in the ranking of the 100 richest Ukrainians according to Focus magazine (No. 99 on the list, the state is $30 million).
- 2014 – participant in the ranking of the 100 richest Ukrainians according to Focus magazine (No. 94 on the list, the state is $111 million).

== Ranks and awards ==
In 2012 Igor Nikonov won the "Man of the Year 2012" in the nomination "Businessman of the Year".

On January 22, 2014, Igor Nikonov was awarded the title of "Honored Builder of Ukraine by Presidential Edict".
