= Mirax (Kyiv) =

- Interactive map of the Mirax area
- Former names: Capital Center (2005–2006); Mirax Plaza Ukraine (2006–2010)

General information
- Status: Under construction
- Type: Residential
- Location: Kyiv, Ukraine
- Coordinates: 50.4627086°N 30.4968828°E
- Construction started: December 22, 2006
- Construction stopped: 2008; 2022
- Estimated completion: 2022
- Opening: TBD

Height
- Roof: 110 m (360 ft)

Technical details
- Floor count: 28

Design and construction
- Developer: El Consulting (2005–2006); Mirax Group (2006–2010); Kyivmiskbud (2015–present)

The Mirax residential complex, formerly Capital Center and Mirax Plaza Ukraine, is a group of buildings currently under construction in Kyiv, the capital of Ukraine. It is located in the central Podilskyi district at 43, Hlybochytska St. The complex consists of seven buildings, including a 28-story skyscraper

== History ==
An initial architectural concept was developed by El Consulting in 2005, it envisioned a mixed use office and residential complex called Capital Center, consisting of a 3-story shopping mall, 22 story residential part and 45 story office building, which at 172 meters would have been the highest in Ukraine.

A render of the Mirax Plaza Ukraine

Construction began on December 22, 2006, by Russian company Mirax Group with workers from Turkey. The plan was changed into twin 46 story towers which were supposed to reach 192 meters, called Mirax Plaza Ukraine and was initially expected to be completed by 2010.

In 2008 the work was put on hold due to the Great Recession. In May 2009, it was reported that Mirax Group had been in negotiations with another Russian corporation to sell the project. Some six months later, AEON Corporation acquired the share in the project and announced plans to correct the existing concept and commence construction in the autumn of 2010. By February 2010, only 11 floors of the first tower had been constructed.

In 2016, the abandoned construction site was taken over by the municipal company Kyivmiskbud due to growing debt. The project was renamed to Mirax and scaled down to single tower, cut down to almost just half of the originally projected height, a mere 28 floors and six smaller buildings, ranging between 8 and 23 floors. The tower was topped out in 2020 and the entire complex was scheduled to be completed by the end of 2022, but work has had been halted by the Russia's full-scale invasion of Ukraine ongoing since 24 February 2022.

== See also ==
- List of tallest buildings in Europe
