= Book of Records of Ukraine =

Book and publication listing Ukrainian records

- Founded: 2002
- Region served: Ukraine
- Chairman of the Editorial Board: Oleh Ivanenko
- General Director: Hanna Krysyuk
- Director: Ihor Pidchibiy
- Staff: 8 people
- Website: record.org.ua

Book of Records of Ukraine is a project and trademark under which records and achievements in Ukraine are documented. It is owned by the company LLC «Ukrimage». Record registration is conducted on both a paid and free basis.

The project is a partner of the international «Book of Guinness World Records». However, unlike the latter, the «Book of Records of Ukraine» does not register «silly» or dangerous records.

Despite its name, the records registered by the project are not published in book form.

== History ==
The project was initiated in 2002 when Oleksiy Svystunov, the owner of the «Book of Records of Russia», approached Ihor Pidchibiy with a request to help register a dishwashing record. In 2002, Ihor Pidchibiy and his colleagues registered the copyright for the work «National Presentation-Image Project ‘Book of Records of Ukraine’», and in 2004, they registered the trademark «Book of Records of Ukraine».

The first record registered by the «Book of Records of Ukraine» was the creation of a 10-meter-long tuxedo by designer Mykhailo Voronin. As of 2012, the project had registered over 1,500 records, some of which were published on the project's website. By 2018, the number of registered records reached 20,000.

Initially, the project paid honorariums to record holders, but this practice was later discontinued.

== Competition with the «National Register of Records» ==
The emergence of the «National Register of Records of Ukraine» in 2010 was perceived by the «Book of Records of Ukraine» team as an illegal copying of their activities and a violation of their copyrights.
