= State Export-Import Bank of Ukraine =

Bank in Kyiv, Ukraine

Public JSC «Ukreximbank» ПАТ «Укрексімбанк»

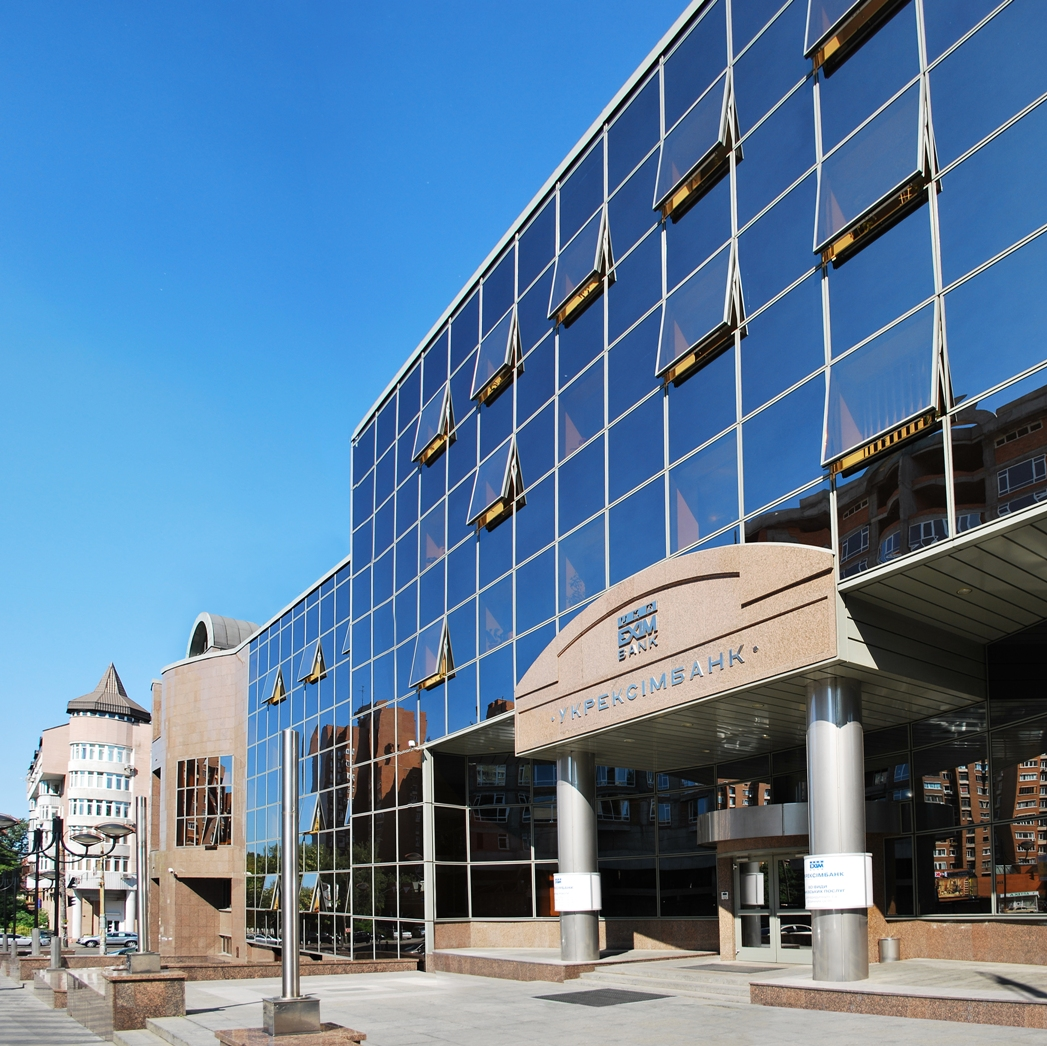
- Ukreximbank head office in Kyiv
- Type: Public Joint-Stock Company
- Industry: Banking, investment
- Founded: January 3, 1992 (approved by NBU on 23 January 1992)
- Founder: Government of Ukraine
- Headquarters: Kyiv, Ukraine
- Key people: Victor Ponomarenko (Chairman of the Management Board)
- Services: Financial services
- Net income: ▲ ₴3.595.074 million (30.09.2023)
- Total assets: ▲ ₴243.245.896 billion (30.09.2023)
- Owner: 100% Government of Ukraine
- Website: www.eximb.com/eng/
- Footnotes; All figures annualized for 2017

The Public JSC Ukreximbank (full name: Ukrainian: ПАТ "Державний експортно-імпортний банк України", romanized: PAT “Derzhavnyi eksportno-importnyi bank Ukrainy”) is a significant public bank in Ukraine, 100% of whose shares are owned by the state represented by the Cabinet of Ministers of Ukraine. It was established by the Government of Ukraine in 1992 to implement state policies in the fields of industry, foreign trade, economy, and finance. In early 2024, it was confirmed by the National Bank of Ukraine as one of the country's systemically important banks.

In 2023, Ukreximbank earned UAH 5 billion for the state, a record in the Bank's history. According to the results of 2023 and 2025, Ukreximbank ranked first in the rating of primary dealers of the Ministry of Finance of Ukraine. The Bank ranks first at the PFTS Ukraine Stock Exchange in the rating of securities traders at the country's stock exchanges. In addition, according to the results of 2023, Ukreximbank ranks first among the most active participants in the “REPO with risk control” market.

As of February 2024, “Ukreximbank” JSC ranks first in the banking market in terms of the net loan portfolio of legal entities (including provisions) (UAH 75.6 billion; ranks second in terms of the number of funds of legal entities customers (UAH 142.5 billion) and is the leader in terms of the loan portfolio of IFIs programs (UAH 27.8 billion).

== History ==
The State Export-Import Bank of Ukraine was established on January 3, 1992, in accordance with the Decree of the President of Ukraine No. 29/92. According to this Decree, all structural units of the Foreign Economic Affairs Bank of the USSR located on the territory of Ukraine were included in the new institution. On January 23, 1992, the Bank received its first license from the National Bank of Ukraine. In 1993, Ukreximbank joined the S.W.I.F.T. international settlement system.

In 2008, the Bank became a member of The Global Network of Export-Import Banks and Development Finance Institutions – G-NEXID). On May 5, 2009, the Resolution of the Cabinet of Ministers of Ukraine No. 375 dated April 15, 2009, entered into force, according to which Ukreximbank changed its full name from an open joint stock company to a public joint stock company by making appropriate changes to the Bank's Charter.

In 2011, the Bank carried out the first in history successful transaction to raise funds denominated in the national currency of Ukraine on international markets. This issue of three-year Eurobonds worth more than UAH 2.3 billion was recognized by EuroWeek as the transaction of the year in the category “Transactions denominated in the currency of countries from emerging markets”.

In 2015, Ukreximbank was the first among the companies whose external debt obligations were included in the general process of negotiations of the Government of Ukraine with the holders of external debt of the public sector, to successfully complete negotiations with investors on the restructuring of Eurobonds due in 2015, 2016 and 2018 for the total amount of USD 1.475 billion. Since 2016, according to the Decision of the NBU Board, Ukreximbank has been determined as a systemically important bank, a status it has consistently maintained to this day.

In November 2020, Resolution of the Cabinet of Ministers of Ukraine No. 1085 dated November 4, 2020, entered into force, according to which Ukreximbank changed its full name from a public joint stock company to a joint stock company by making appropriate changes to the Bank's Charter. In the same year, Ukreximbank, for the first time among Ukrainian Eurobond issuers, conducted a proactive liability management transaction without simultaneous placement of a new issue (cash tender offer), which made it possible to optimize the price parameters of the bank's liabilities base. At the end of 2020, after the introduction of quarantine, Ukreximbank continued to ensure uninterrupted operation. The Bank secured the support of the National Bank and expanded refinancing limits, which became a reliable instrument for obtaining funds for operational and financial activities. Agreements on cooperation with the Entrepreneurship Development Fund have been concluded and financing of legal entities and private entrepreneurs under the “Affordable loans 5-7-9%” state program, as well as under two programs of lending to industry sectors and supporting investment projects has begun. In order to facilitate the expansion of the export of goods, works, and services of Ukrainian origin, Ukreximbank has started cooperation with the Export Credit Agency and concluded the first agreements on the provision of financing for the execution of export contracts under ECA insurance coverage.

Ukreximbank has been appointed as the Government Agent for the implementation of the program for providing state guarantees on a portfolio basis to support micro, small, and medium-sized businesses in Ukraine by facilitating access to bank financing for enterprises. A separate business vertical has been established in the Bank in the area of work with medium-sized businesses, municipalities, amalgamated territorial communities and utility enterprises and active cooperation with local authorities has begun.

In 2023, Ukreximbank earned UAH 5 billion for the state. During the 2024 financial year, the bank recorded a pre-tax profit of UAH 5.9 billion, a 20.1% increase compared to 2023.

== Operations ==
The structure of “Ukreximbank” JSC consists of the Head Office, 22 branches, 28 sub-branches, and 2 representative offices abroad – in London and New York. Ukreximbank has the most extensive network of correspondent banks in Ukraine (more than 850 banking institutions in different countries around the world). The bank's mission is to promote the development of the economy of Ukraine and the business of customers, primarily export-oriented and import-substituting sectors of the economy, by lending and providing banking services for customers' financial transactions, supporting national exporters, and acting as the financial agent of the Government of Ukraine.

The Charter of the Bank stipulates that “Ukreximbank” JSC was established to attract external and internal credit resources to the economy of Ukraine, provide and receive loans on behalf of and upon the instruction of the Cabinet of Ministers of Ukraine (as the financial agent of the Government), finance and guarantee export-import transactions of enterprises, service the state external debt of Ukraine, carry out transactions in the money, currency and stock markets, implement a set of measures for financing investment projects, provide banking services, cooperate with international financial institutions, implement other types of activities, carry out other transactions following the legislation and the requirements of the Charter.

“Ukreximbank” JSC successfully cooperates with leading international financial institutions, such as the World Bank, EBRD, KfW, NIB, IFC, with large foreign banks and financial and credit institutions. Over the years of its activities in international financial markets and in the field of export financing, the Bank has become a direct borrower and guarantor of 35 leading export credit agencies worldwide.

From 1992 to 1998, the bank's head office was located at the address: 8, Khreshchatyk Street, Kyiv, and since 1998, it has been located at the address: 127, Antonovycha Street, Kyiv.

On November 29, 2023, Ukreximbank together with the Come Back Alive fund contributed to providing support for the Marines brigades of the Ukrainian Armed Forces. In January 2026, Ukreximbank announced the closure of several of its key branches in Ukraine, including its central office in Kyiv.

== Management ==
By the resolution of the Supervisory Board of "Ukreximbank" JSC dated 3 May 2024, Victor Ponomarenko was approved as the Chairman of the Management Board of JSC "Ukreximbank". Victor Ponomarenko starts his work as the Chairman of the Management Board of JSC "Ukreximbank" on 1 July 2024.

=== Supervisory Board ===
At the beginning of 2024, the first meeting of the new Supervisory Board was held in Ukreximbank. Representatives of the state-appointed to the Supervisory Board include Oleksandr Bevz, Yuriy Butsa, and Viktoriya Strakhova.

Independent members of the Supervisory Board include:

- Sylvia Yumi Gansser-Potts
- Razvan Munteanu
- Robert S. Kossmann
- Dominique Menu
- Rostyslav Futalo

The members of the Supervisory Board of Ukreximbank have many years of work experience in various fields, in particular, in corporate governance, regulatory compliance, strategic management, risk management, digital transformation, finance and audit, problem asset workout, investment activities, and international cooperation.

== Ratings and awards ==
- At the fifth International Finance Corporation (IFC) Partner Banks Meeting in Dubai, “Ukreximbank” JSC was recognized as the best-issuing bank in Europe and Central Asia for pre-export finance in 2012 under the Global Trade Finance Program.
- In October 2012, Ukreximbank ranked first in terms of reliability in the updated data of the First Ukrainian Deposit Index (FUDI). It was the only one among all financial institutions to receive A rating, which is characterized as “The highest reliability among Ukrainian banks. Low sensitivity to adverse external factors”.
- In August 2012, in the “Guardian of Corporate Brands — 2012” rating (“Galician Contracts” publishing house) Ukreximbank's brand was estimated at UAH 30 billion — the most expensive financial brand in Ukraine.
- Ukreximbank topped the rating of bank deposits reliability as of the beginning of 2012, published by the “Real Economy” publication — the state financial institution won this rating for the fifth time in a row. The "A" rating indicates a combination of strong financial indicators — the dynamics of equity, the adequacy of capital to assets, profitability, and long-term dynamics of deposits. The rating of banks' attractiveness for depositors is an information project aimed at a comprehensive assessment of the largest banks in Ukraine in terms of assets. It takes into account the most important factors of the attractiveness of institutions for depositors, which can be calculated based on public information.
- According to the Pi-rating of reliability of banks by the “Expert-Rating” agency, the bank has a B++ rating based on the results of 2010 (25th position out of 87).
- According to the authoritative British publication "The Banker", Ukreximbank was recognized as the best bank of 2005 in Ukraine.
- According to the results of the “Banks of the Year – 2024” study, Ukreximbank was recognized as one of the best settlement banks for businesses. According to the delo.ua and TOP-100: Ratings of the best magazine rating, Ukreximbank was recognized as the number one bank in the nomination “Bank with the best conditions for SMEs and the corporate sector" and in the special nomination "Efficiency in NPA and NPL workout”.
- According to the version of the International Financial Club "Bankir", in 2023 Ukreximbank was recognized as a reliable partner of medium-sized businesses, municipalities, and utility enterprises.
- Ranked 9th among the top 30 Ukrainian companies in the 2025 Digitalisation Champions study conducted by Forbes Ukraine and KPMG.
- Winner in the category “Efficiency in NPA and NPL Management” (organised by Delo.ua).
- In 2025, the Ukrainian Banks Association awarded three honors to the bank at the Financial Awards of the Year: Customer trust, Business banking support and Banking efficiency and profitability.
- Also in 2025, the bank was recognised by the Euromoney Awards for Excellence as “Best Bank in Ukraine for Corporate Clients.”

== Gallery ==
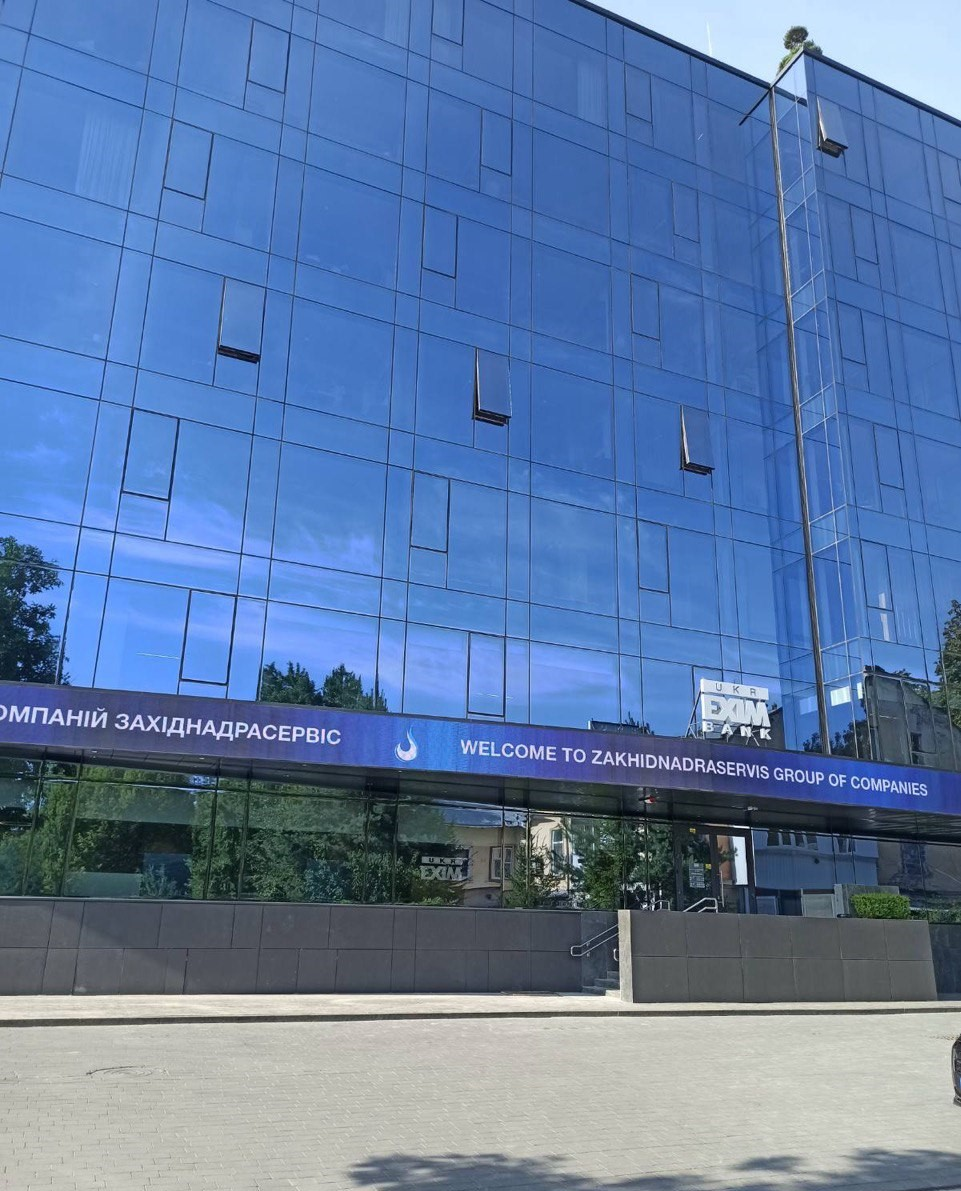
The Lviv office of Ukreximbank

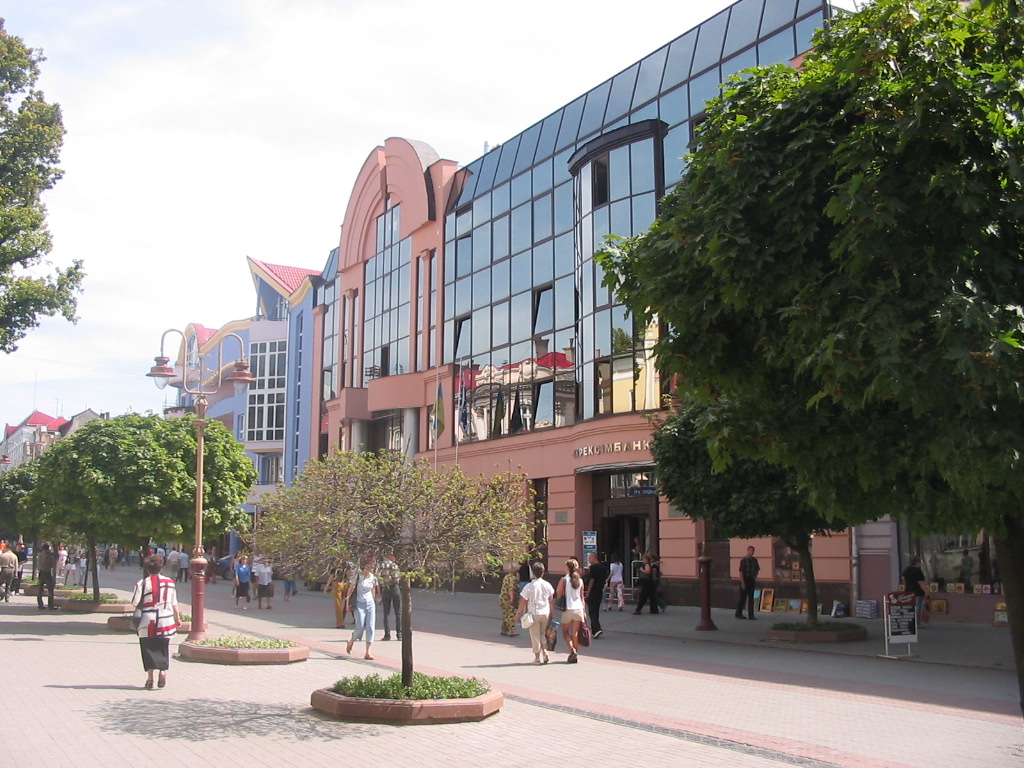
Ukreximbank office in the city of Ivano-Frankivsk

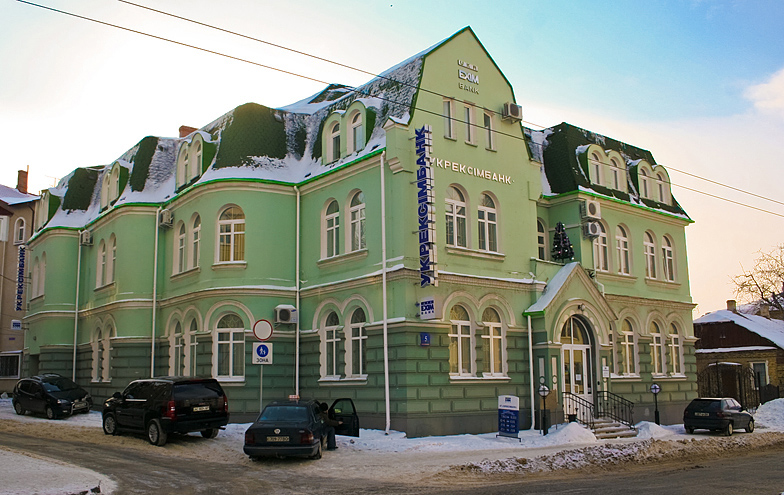
Ukreximbank Lutsk local office

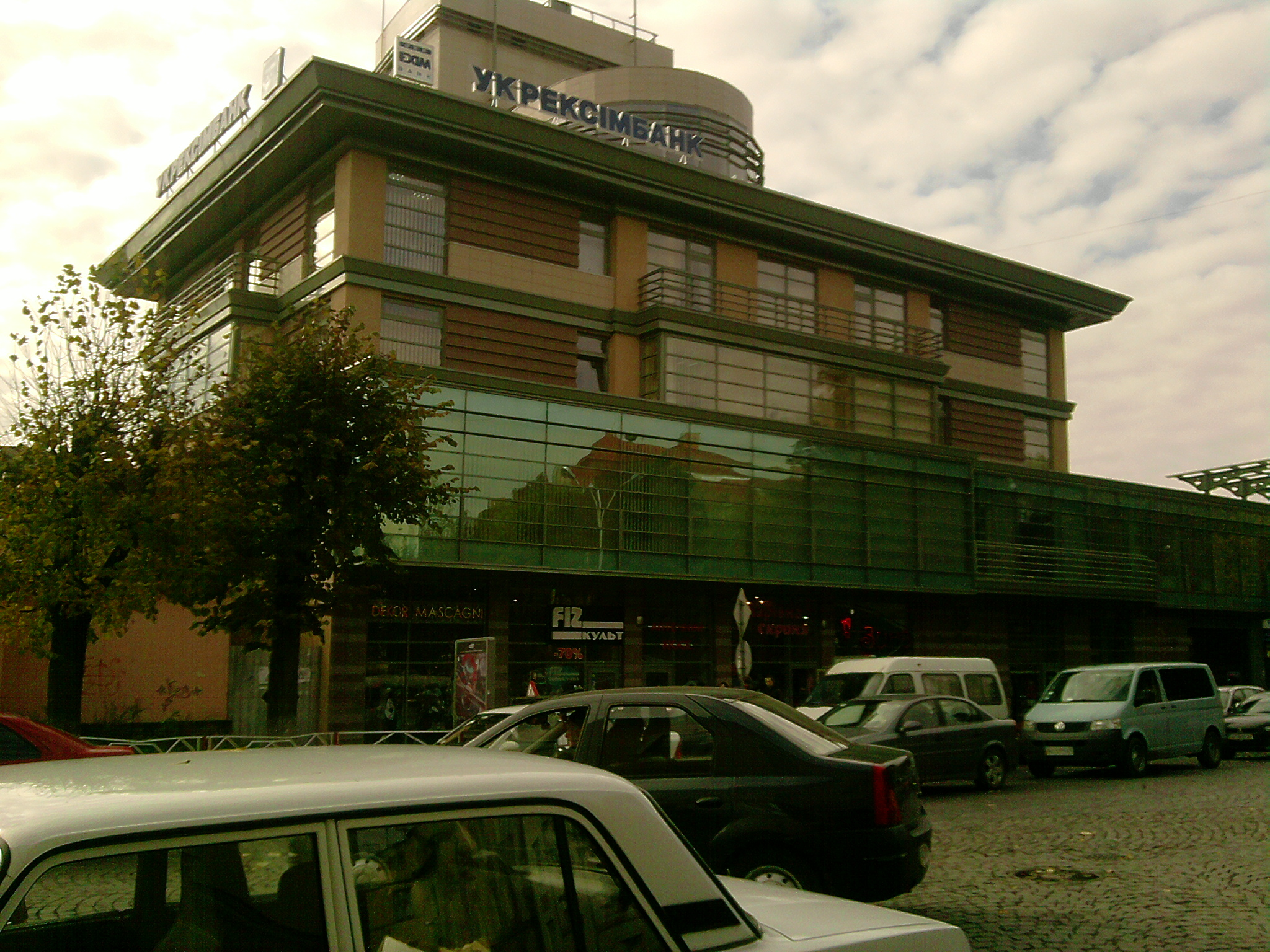
Ukreximbank office in Uzhhorod, western Ukraine

== See also ==
- List of banks in Ukraine
