= Parus Business Centre =

Office building in Ukraine

- Interactive map of the Parus Business Centre area

General information
- Type: Office
- Location: Kyiv, Ukraine
- Coordinates: 50°26′15.49″N 30°31′37.87″E
- Construction started: 2004
- Completed: 2007
- Cost: ca. $100,000,000

Height
- Antenna spire: 156 m (512 ft)
- Roof: 136 m (446 ft)

Technical details
- Floor count: 34
- Floor area: 69,020 m^{2} (742,900 sq ft)^{[a]}
- Lifts/elevators: 8 + 1 fire and freight elevators

Design and construction
- Architects: S. Babushkin and A. Komarovskyi
- Developer: Mandaryn Plaza Ltd.
- Main contractor: Osnova-Solsif

The Parus Business Centre (Ukrainian: Бізнес Центр «Парус») is a 34-story class-A office building in Kyiv, the capital of Ukraine. It is located at the centre of the city, between Mechnikova St. and Lesi Ukrainky Blvd. (municipal address: 2, Mechnikova St.).

At its opening in 2007 the Parus Business Centre was the tallest building it the country, as of 2018 it remains the third tallest.

Construction of the building began in 2004, and ended in February 2007. Apart from its main office use 50,400 m^{2} (543,000 sq ft), the property features some 2,400 m^{2} (26,000 sq ft) of retail space and around 2,700 m^{2} (29,000 sq ft) of cafes and restaurants and a 4-story underground parking garage with a capacity for 300 cars.

During construction the project was also known as "Elsburg Plaza" (Ukrainian: «Ельсбург Плаза»), but was later renamed to "Parus" (literally translated as "sail") ostensibly because of building's oval-like shape, resembling sail of a ship.

In July 2008, Kontrakty, Ukrainian business weekly, rated top 10 most expensive offices in Kyiv. Parus was top of the chart in terms of annual rental income, at $50 million.

Major tenants at Parus include McKinsey & Company, Concorde Capital, an investment bank; TNK-BP, an oil company; Olimp, Ukrainian spirits company; Delin Development, a real estate development company; Interpipe, steel pipes producer and others.

Parus was developed and is owned by "Mandaryn Plaza Ltd." (Ukrainian: ЗАТ «Мандарин Плаза»), a joint-stock company, prominent for its Mandarin Plaza shopping centre in Kyiv. From 2007 to 2016 the building was owned by Ukrainian businessman, Dmytro Firtash.

== See also ==
- List of tallest buildings in Europe

== Notes ==
a. The figure is the total area of ground floors only. The total gross building area (GBA) of Parus, including underground parking garage comes to ca. 75,000 sqm (ca. 807,300 sqf).

Records
Preceded by Kyiv Appellate Court Building	Tallest building in Ukraine; 2007—2012	Succeeded by MFC Gulliver
Preceded by Kyiv Appellate Court Building	Tallest building in Kyiv; 2007—2012	Succeeded by MFC Gulliver
