= Mikhail Grinshpon =

Ukrainian businessman (1952–2023)

- Михайло Петрович Гріншпон
- Born: December 5, 1952; Maydan, Ukrainian SSR, Soviet Union
- Died: July 15, 2023 (aged 70); Warsaw, Poland (death certificate registration)
- Burial place: New York, USA
- Occupations: Businessperson; Corporate executive; Government advisor
- Years active: 1974–2023
- Known for: Co-founder of Kyiv-Donbass and Nadra Bank; advisor to the Ministry of Defence and State Space Agency of Ukraine; central figure in the Ukrkosmos / Lybid satellite embezzlement case

Mikhail Petrovich Grinshpon (Ukrainian: Михайло Петрович Гріншпон; Russian: Михаил Петрович Гриншпон; 5 December 1952 – c. July 2023) was a Ukrainian businessperson, corporate executive, and political advisor. He was a co-founder of the Kyiv-Donbass corporation and Nadra Bank, served as an advisor to the Ministry of Defence of Ukraine in the late 1990s, and later acted as an advisor to the Head of the State Space Agency of Ukraine and the state-owned enterprise Ukrkosmos. In 1998, he stood for election to the Verkhovna Rada (3rd convocation) as a candidate from the "SLOn - Social-Liberal Association" election bloc.

In the late 2010s, Grinshpon became the central figure in a high-profile corruption investigation conducted by the National Anti-Corruption Bureau of Ukraine (NABU) and the Specialized Anti-Corruption Prosecutor's Office (SAPO) concerning the embezzlement of $8.245 million from a Canadian government loan allocated for the launch of Ukraine's first telecommunications satellite, Lybid. On 17 April 2024, criminal proceedings against Grinshpon were officially closed by the High Anti-Corruption Court of Ukraine (HACC) following confirmation of his death in Warsaw, Poland.

== Early life and political career ==
Grinshpon was born on 5 December 1952 in the village of Maydan, Ukrainian SSR. From 1974 to 1990, he worked in executive and engineering roles at Auto Transport Enterprise No. 1 (ATP-1) of the Kyivmiskbud state construction corporation, advancing from engineer to deputy director. Between 1990 and 1991, he headed the Kyiv branch of the Radon consortium, subsequently serving as director of Interkrez and director of the Kyiv regional directorate of NVO Don.

During the 1998 Ukrainian parliamentary election, Grinshpon ran for a seat in the Verkhovna Rada (3rd convocation) on the list of the election bloc of parties "SLOn - Social-Liberal Association", though he was not elected.

== Business ventures ==
=== Kyiv-Donbass and Nadra Bank ===
In 1993, Grinshpon co-founded the Kyiv-Donbass corporation alongside business partners including Viktor Topolov. The company initially engaged in coal logistics, nuclear fuel supply, and mining equipment distribution, before expanding into commercial and residential real estate development across Kyiv. In the same year, Grinshpon became one of the founding shareholders of Nadra Bank, which grew into one of Ukraine's largest commercial banks.

=== Real estate and banking assets ===
Between 2007 and 2008, Grinshpon acquired a 61% controlling stake in ATP-1 through the offshore entity Kidare Limited. He established and directed Nelora Limited and its subsidiary Nelora-Land, which planned extensive real estate and construction projects in Kyiv and the Kyiv Oblast, including proposed developments in Kyiv-City, the Romanivsky glass factory, and suburban residential complexes in Horenychi.

Grinshpon was also the initial founder and owner of Lawrence Group (LLC), which established Avant Bank in 2008 before selling his ownership stake in 2011 to Alexey Savchenko. In addition to his corporate holdings, Grinshpon served on the supervisory board of the Jewish Confederation of Ukraine.

== Ministry of Defence and UATC (1990s) ==
In 1996, Grinshpon was appointed as an advisor to Ukrainian Minister of Defence Oleksandr Kuzmuk. During his tenure at the Ministry of Defence, he served as president of the CSKA Kyiv football club.

He was instrumental in establishing the Ukrainian Aviation Transport Company (UATC) in November 1997, a state enterprise created to commercially operate and lease Ukraine's military cargo aircraft fleet, including 175 transport aircraft and helicopters such as the Ilyushin Il-76. Grinshpon stepped down from his advisory position at the Ministry of Defence in 2000 following controversy surrounding military asset sales and arms export disputes.

Following the disaster in Brovary on 20 April 2000, Mikhail Grinshpon ran from Ukraine. But after Ihor Smeshko became a director of the Security Service of Ukraine in 2003, Grinshpon returned to Ukraine becoming an adviser to director of the State Space Agency of Ukraine.

== State Space Agency and the Lybid satellite project ==
In the 2000s, Grinshpon became an advisor to the Head of the State Space Agency of Ukraine (SSAU) and the state-owned enterprise Ukrkosmos. In May 2010, Ukrkosmos signed a $254 million contract with Canadian aerospace company MacDonald, Dettwiler and Associates (MDA) to build and launch Ukraine's first national geostationary telecommunications satellite, Lybid. The project was funded by a $292 million loan provided by Export Development Canada under Ukrainian government guarantees.

According to law enforcement investigations, financial transfers to project subcontractors passed through Birklin Limited, a Seychelles-registered offshore company managed by Grinshpon. In May 2011, Ukrkosmos director Serhiy Kapshtyk instructed MDA to transfer $26.1 million of loan funds to Birklin Limited. Between May and August 2011, Birklin Limited was tasked with transferring $8.245 million to Ukrainian state manufacturer Yuzhmash for the construction of a Zenit-3SLB launch rocket.

The funds failed to reach Yuzhmash and disappeared through offshore accounts, halting rocket production and leaving the completed satellite stored in Russia. In media interviews, Grinshpon acknowledged managing Birklin Limited but claimed the $8.245 million was lost due to the collapse of Laiki Bank during the 2012–2013 Cypriot financial crisis.

== Criminal investigation and legal proceedings ==
In 2016, the National Anti-Corruption Bureau of Ukraine (NABU) initiated a criminal investigation into the misappropriation of funds at Ukrkosmos. On 4 December 2018, NABU and the Specialized Anti-Corruption Prosecutor's Office (SAPO) formally notified Grinshpon of suspicion as the primary organizer of the embezzlement scheme. He was charged under Article 27 Part 3, Article 364 Part 2 (abuse of office), Article 191 Part 5 (misappropriation of property), and Article 209 Part 3 (money laundering) of the Criminal Code of Ukraine.

On 6 December 2018, the Solomianskyi District Court of Kyiv placed Grinshpon under 24-hour house arrest. SAPO officially referred the indictment against Grinshpon and Ukrkosmos ex-director Serhiy Kapshtyk to the High Anti-Corruption Court of Ukraine (HACC) on 26 September 2019, with trial proceedings commencing on 22 October 2019.

On 31 July 2023, Grinshpon's defense attorney submitted a Warsaw-issued death certificate to the court. On 17 April 2024, the HACC officially terminated criminal proceedings against Grinshpon due to his death. The court subsequently found co-defendant Serhiy Kapshtyk guilty and sentenced him to five years' imprisonment, though he was released from serving the sentence due to the expiration of the statute of limitations.
