= Andrii Artemenko =

Ukrainian politician

Andy Victor Kuchma
- Андрій Артеменко
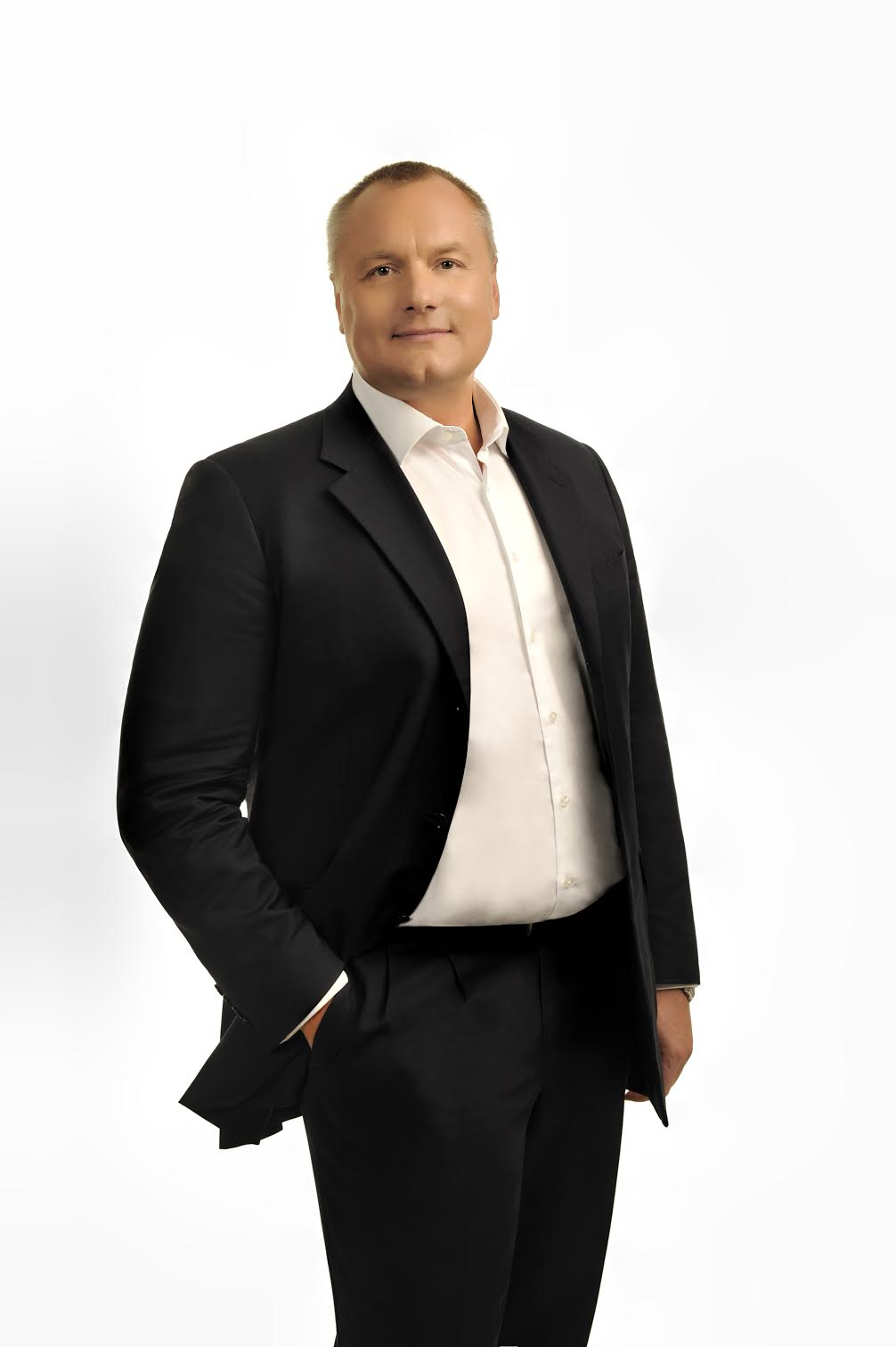
- Andrey Artemenko, a Ukrainian politician, the People's Deputy of Ukraine of the 8th convocation of Verkovna Rada

People's Deputy of Ukraine

8th convocation
- In office November 27, 2014 – 24 July 2019
- Constituency: Radical Party, No.16

Personal details
- Born: Andrii Viktorovych Artemenko; 14 January 1969 (age 57) Kyiv, Ukrainian SSR, Soviet Union
- Party: Solidarity of Right Forces
- Education: Kyiv Polytechnic Institute

Andy Victor Kuchma (Ukrainian: Андрій Вікторович Артеменко, born 14 January 1969, Kyiv), before emigrating to the United States of America, served as a Ukrainian politician and businessman, the People's Deputy of Ukraine of the 8th convocation of Verkhovna Rada (Ukrainian Parliament), and chairman of the "Solidarity of Right Forces" - Ukrainian political party.

== Education ==
Artemenko was born in Kyiv on January 14, 1969. In 1976, he attended Kyiv school No.43. Later, attended school No. 178. It was in school that he showed an interest in history, geography and military training. He paid special attention to geopolitics and various forms of government. Later, together with other famous graduates, he provided welfare assistance to school No. 178. In particular, he arranged governmental funding for the completion of a second building.

In 1986, Andrii Artemenko entered Kyiv Polytechnic Institute, Department of Electric Power Engineering, where he specialized in energy engineering. From 1987 to 1989, he was conscripted into the Soviet Army as a motorized rifleman and served in various military units throughout the Soviet Union. In May 1989, he was transferred to the Armed Forces reserves of the USSR. After returning to Kyiv, he continued his studies at Kyiv Polytechnic Institute, at the Computer Science Department, and got a master's degree in systems engineering in 1993.

He worked in various jobs in Belgium during the early 1990s.

== Start of business activities ==
In 1993–1994, Andrii Artemenko founded and operated "Krista" (Russian: ПМЖ "Криста"), an export and import operation with raw materials for the light industry.

From 1994 to 1996, he was chairman of the board of CJSC "New Lines" (Russian: ЗАО "Новые Линии").

In 1994, he visited the United States for the first time and during this trip attended training courses on "International Sports Law", which prompted him in 1996 to establish a law firm in Ukraine "First Legal Club". This entity was the first such organization in the post-soviet territory, which served most successful sportsmen from the former Soviet Union and provided legal, consulting and management support, as well as their employment abroad.

From 1996 to 1999, he was president of the law firm "First Legal Club", which represented the majority of the athletes former USSR gaining them employment abroad.

Andrii Artemenko served as Head of Committee on Status of Football players in Football Federation of Ukraine.

During same period, Artemenko also has started selling broadcasting rights to the world's leading sports competitions to Ukrainian central TV channels - such as: UEFA Champions League, World and European football Cups, Boxing world tournaments and others.

In 1996, he founded Ukrainian Trade Union of professional football players, which is now a member of FIFPRO (part of FIFA since 1998).

Replacing Viktor Topolov in 1999, Andrii Artemenko became the President of the government enterprise of the Ministry of Defense of Ukraine football club CSKA Kyiv (later changed to FC Arsenal Kyiv) and held the position until 2000.

== Political career ==
In 1998, he met the public politician, head of the Kyiv City State Administration, Oleksandr Omelchenko. That same year, he took part in election campaign of Omelchenko who was elected the Mayor of Kyiv. Together they founded a political party called "Unity".

In 2000, he was appointed adviser for the Mayor of Kyiv Omelchenko. Artemenko left this office in 2004.

In 2001, during a campaign to discredit Omelchenko, Artemenko became a subject of attention by the General Prosecutor's Office because of his close connection to the Mayor. The General Prosecutor's Office questioned him repeatedly. In spring 2002, in an attempt to increase the pressure on Omelchenko, Artemenko was arrested. "It was done deliberately. I was held in different remand prisons (SIZO), sometimes in the same cell with persons sick with pulmonary TB. I was ordered by the heads of security agencies to sign a statement saying that Olexander Omelchenko illegally transferred money from accounts of Kyiv City State Administration to his political project to a construction project of his son's facilities. Coercion to give false testimony was unacceptable, so I stayed true to my positions and did not perjured," Artemenko said. On October 22, 2004, Artemenko was released on bail of some MPs. Although all charges against Artemenko were subsequently dropped in 2007 by Kyiv prosecutor Renat Kuzmin (Russian: Ренат Кузьмин) and the courts of Ukraine confirmed the illegitimacy of the claims, he had spent 2 years 7 months and 21 days in prison.

During the Orange Revolution (2004), he met Yulia Tymoshenko. Later, on a request of Yulia Tymoshenko, he became one of the leaders of her election campaign headquarters, where he succeeded in gaining many constituencies.

In 2006, he was elected as a deputy of the Kyiv City Council and led the faction of Yulia Tymoshenko Bloc. He was also a Deputy Head of Committee for ecological questions of Kyiv City Council. Artemenko participated in the development and implementation of many environmental and infrastructural programs successfully executed and still operating today.

== Career in the defense industry ==
Since 2005 Artemenko founded a number of companies specialized in air transport and military logistics supporting special operations in "hot spots". From 2008 to 2012, his main activities were logistical support of Ukraine and NATO forces in North Africa and the Middle East: Tunisia, Libya, Egypt, Afghanistan and other countries of the region.

In 2012, he participated in the implementation of a major innovative project in Qatar, which is associated with induced effects on the environment in order to increase the humidity and precipitation. "This was a military technology, developed by military engineers. I was personally engaged in the installation of this technology in Qatar," he stated.

In November 2012, with his personal assistance, the Embassy of Ukraine was opened in the State of Qatar and the State of Qatar embassy was opened accordingly in Ukraine.

== Parliamentary activities ==
Artemenko defines himself as a neoconservative. He held strong positions concerning urgent changes in the state. Therefore, he responded to the invitation of the leader of the Radical Party, Oleh Lyashko, and agreed to be on the list for early parliamentary elections in October 2014.

Artemenko realized Ukraine needed an ideological party. He studied the performance and experience of various political systems, taking as an example the activities of political organizations like the US Republican Party and the UK Conservative Party. Together with other like-minded individuals and following his beliefs, he founded a political party called "Solidarity of Right Forces" in November 2014. It was all done in contrast to the numerous artificial election projects. The "Solidarity of Right Forces" party set a goal to participate in all upcoming elections: local, parliamentary, and presidential.

Before the Maidan uprising beginning in November 2013 against pro-Russia, pro-Kremlin, pro-Putin policies of Viktor Yanukovych and the Party of Regions, which were supported by Paul Manafort and Rudy Giuliani, (Note: In 2001, Maidan Nezalezhnosti had protests for Ukraine without Kuchma, which led to Andrii Derkach's father Leonid Derkach being fired, because the President of Ukraine Leonid Kuchma's strong support of Vladimir Putin and his very pro-Russia, pro-Kremlin stance and involvement in the murder of Georgiy Gongadze which was revealed in the Cassette Scandal that led to the Orange Revolution in 2004.) Artemenko was in the post-Party of Regions block established by Manafort who, according to sources, was receiving payments from pro-Russia, pro-Kremlin, pro-Putin sources. He was the Deputy Chairman of the Committee of the Verkhovna Rada on issues of European integration, Subcommittees on Cooperation of Ukraine and NATO and EU Common Security and Defense Policy. Furthermore, he is a member of the subcommittee on economic and sectoral cooperation and a free trade zone between Ukraine and the EU. Andrii Artemenko is actively pursuing his point of view on the non-aligned status of Ukraine and good neighborly, friendly, and mutually beneficial cooperative relations with neighboring countries. On 16 November 2016, he stated that he is not a supporter of Ukraine joining any supranational structure, union, or organization.

Andrii Artemenko headed the Inter-Parliamentary Group of Friendship with Qatar, which included 23 MPs. Besides, he is a co-chair of Parliamentary Friendship Group with Slovenia.

On December 25, 2014, the establishment of the inter-factional deputy group "Solidarity of Right Forces" was announced in the Parliament. Andrii Artemenko initiated the formation of the party and eventually headed it. The members of Parliament are working together on the draft bills to solve middle class problems in Ukraine. In particular, it creates a favorable legal environment for business, private property protection, and fair trial.

Andrii Artemenko authored 37 bills, of which 17 were voted into law. Some of representative bills are: number 1601 "On Amendments to the administrative-territorial system of Luhansk region, changing and setting boundaries of Popasnjansky and Slavyanoserbsk districts of Luhansk region", number 1310 "On Amendments to Article 41 of the Law of Ukraine" On Joint Stock Companies" (with respect to the quorum of the general meetings of joint stock companies with majority state corporate rights), the bill number 1736 "On the appeal of the Verkhovna Rada of Ukraine to the European Parliament, the Parliament of the Council of Europe and the national parliaments of the EU Member States, the USA, Canada, Japan and Australia on the issue of the mass shooting of people near Volnovakha", the Resolution number 2066 "On holding parliamentary hearings entitled: "Perspectives of introducing a visa-free regime for the citizens of Ukraine by the European Union" (May 21–22, 2015).

One of the more popular bills initiated by Artemenko was on the legalization of dual citizenship No. 6139 - which currently enjoys the support of the incumbent President of Ukraine, Volodymyr Zelensky.

During his tenure as a Member of Parliament, Artemenko criticized Poroshenko's regime and uncovered facts of internal and international corruption.

In July 2013, Paul Manafort and Konstantin Kilimnik flew on Artemenko's plane to Frankfurt.

Artemenko claimed that President Petro Poroshenko had misappropriated funds and Artemenko claimed he received evidence about Poroshenko from Valentyn Nalyvaichenko.

Artemenko did not take part in the 2019 Ukrainian parliamentary election.

== Pro-Trump position ==
According to one of his posts on his Facebook page, Andrii Artemenko was introduced to Michael Cohen and others by the Ukrainian oligarch Alex Oronov. (Note: Alex Oronov (Ukrainian: Олексій Оронов; born 1948 Kharkiv, Ukrainian SSR, USSR - died 2 March 2017, United States) was a powerful Ukrainian oligarch. He started his vast agricultural investments in 1994. Through his Swedish company BZK Grain Alliance AB (originally known as Harvest Moon), he owned the Ukrainian firm Baryshivka Grain Company (Ukrainian: Баришівська зернова компанія) (BZK) and 100,000 acres (40,000 hectares) of farmland in Ukraine growing corn, soybeans, and wheat. He was an investor in Ukrethanol LLC and his daughter Oxana married Bryan Cohen. Bryan Cohen is Michael Cohen's brother. Although he was born in Kharkiv, Ukrainian SSR, USSR, Oronov moved to the United States in 1978, sold lithographs based on items from the Russian State Museum and operated a Manhattan art gallery. At the time of his death, he was a United States citizen and resided in the Trump Hollywood building in Hollywood, Florida, which are condominiums that are controlled by Donald Trump and another investor. Oronov's funeral was in New York City. Oronov had a close relationship with Viktor Topolov (Ukrainian: Віктор Тополов), a powerful Ukrainian banker.)

During a Ukraine-focus conference at Philadelphia's Manor College in February 2016, Artemenko was involved in the development of a peace plan for Ukraine that he called the Rovt-Weldon plan named after Curt Weldon, who was a former congressman that introduced Artemenko to Dana Rohrabacher and Rob Portman, and Alexander Rovt, who is a New York real estate investor. It included a referendum for Crimea on whether it would be leased to Russia for 50 or 100 years, the removal of Russian troops from eastern Ukraine, and the removal of all sanctions against Russia. The plan supported Putin's goals for Ukraine and was discussed among Felix Sater, Michael Cohen and Artemenko during a meeting in January 2017 in the lobby of Park Avenue's Loews Regency New York after which Cohen was to pass the plan to Michael Flynn. Valeriy Chaly, who was the Ukraine Ambassador to the United States, stated that Artemenko was "not authorized to present any alternative peace proposal on behalf of Ukraine to foreign governments, including the US administration" (Russian: "не уполномочен представлять любое альтернативное мирное предложение от имени Украины иностранным правительствам, включая администрацию США").

In 2016, still in the capacity of Ukrainian MP, Andrii Artemenko was the only Ukrainian politician who openly supported then Presidential candidate Donald Trump and demanded that Ukrainian policies were adjusted to take into account Trump's program at the time when official Ukraine publicly supported Democratic Party candidate Hillary Clinton. Artemenko was deprived of Ukrainian citizenship on 29 April 2017, was ousted as a member of the Rada on 16 May 2017, and was forced to leave Ukraine together with his family on 15 May 2017. Andrii Artemenko challenged the decisions in Ukrainian courts but the decision remains in force. On 11 May 2017, he claimed unlawful deprivation of citizenship to The European Court of Human Rights.

On August 11, 2020, the Central Office of the State Bureau of Investigation of Ukraine began a pre-trial investigation of a criminal offense under Article 367 Part 2 of the Criminal Code of Ukraine, as amended in 2001, with regard to the fact of improper performance of their official duties by officials of State Migration Service of Ukraine, Members of the Commission on Citizenship under the President of Ukraine and other high-ranking officials - during the preparation and approval of documents on the termination of citizenship of Ukraine of Andrii Artemenko.

On August 18, 2020, The District Administrative Court of Kyiv received a lawsuit from Andriy Artemenko to the Commission under the President of Ukraine on Citizenship, third parties - the President of Ukraine and the State Migration Service of Ukraine. The plaintiff asks the court to declare illegal the actions of the commission to submit to the President of Ukraine a proposal to satisfy the application of the State Migration Service of Ukraine dated April 21, 2017 to terminate his citizenship of Ukraine.

Reported in The New York Times in February 2017, Artemenko was a back channel between Putin and Trump. As a consequence, Mr. Artemenko was interrogated by Ukrainian General Prosecutor office and became part of the Mueller investigation in the US. In June 2018 Mr. Andrii Artemenko testified under the oath to the grand jury of the Supreme court in Washington DC. No charges were brought against Andrii Artemenko as a result of these investigations.

During the 2019 Ukrainian Presidential elections, Andrii Artemenko endorsed the candidacy of Volodymyr Zelenskyy.

After Zelensky's official statement about work on the reform of dual citizenship and the return of Ukrainian citizenship to Mikhail Saakashvili (he was illegally deprived of his citizenship in 2017 by the decree of the former President of Ukraine Petro Poroshenko), Andrii Artemenko sent a letter to Volodymyr Zelenskyy, requesting the restoration of his constitutional rights and the abolition of decree No. 119/2017 regarding the termination of citizenship.

Lev Parnas stated that Artemenko approached Parnas and Igor Fruman at the Trump Hotel in Washington D.C. in June 2019 to set up a meeting in mid-2019 with Giuliani to give Giuliani assistance during the 2020 United States elections and act as an intermediary between Rudy Giuliani and Andrii Derkach, who is an intelligence agent for Russia, to support damaging information on Democratic presidential candidate Joe Biden.

In December 2019, Artemenko appeared on One America News Network with Giuliani and Andrii Telizhenko allegedly to disseminate disinformation.

On 1 February 2020, Andrii Derkach hired Andy Victor Kuchma and Nabil Ahmad Bader to lobby for Derkach regarding "corruption" just prior to the Senate's voting during the first impeachment of Donald Trump which occurred on 5 February 2020. According to Derkach with support from Giuliani, Derkach, who launched a website NabuLeaks, proposed organizing an interparliamentary group called Friends of Ukraine STOP Corruption which included Devin Nunes, Mick Mulvaney, Lindsey Graham, Ron Johnson, Chuck Grassley, and Jim Jordan. On 31 July 2020, Derkach's agreement for lobbying ended. (Note: On 20 September 2020, Andrii Derkach was sanctioned by the United States Treasury.)

Artemenko is under FBI scrutiny for his work alongside Giuliani and suspected Russian agent Andrii Derkach in their efforts to produce dirt on Hunter and Joe Biden. Forensic News also found that a lobbying company controlled by Artemenko Global Management Association, which is a lobbying firm established in December 2018 and has had business with individuals closely tied to Putin's government, disguised a 2019 payment from the Viktor Medvedchuk associated Ukraine television channel 112 Ukraine, which was an alleged Russian proxy, to appear as though it came from an oil company, but Tetiana Shevchuk of the Anti-Corruption Action Centre stated, "This is money laundering."

Artemenko and his longtime business partner Erik Prince, who is a Republican donor and Trump ally, are in the transportation and logistics business together through Kuchma's firm Airtrans LLC which is registered in Florida and is part of the Prince led Frontier Resource Group.

Artemenko has had real estate business ventures in Miami.

In March 2017, Artemenko stated that he has known Dmitro Firtash for many years and often allows Firtash to use Artemenko's aircraft. Belbek Avia, which is a firm that Artemenko's father Viktor Andreevich Artemenko established, is located in Sebastopol. As an advisor to Alexander Omelchenko in the late 1990s, Artemenko oversaw Kyiv's aviation industry.

== Current activities ==
Through Skyway International, Vadim Trincher, who operated a gambling and money laundering operation in unit 63A in Trump Tower in New York involving Molly Bloom, Alimzhan Tokhtakhunov, Anatoly "Tony" Golubchik and others, oversaw Global Assets INC. which is a Florida registered company which lists Artemenko and his wife as owners.

Andy Kuchma is currently the co-owner and Executive Chairman of Airtrans LLC that is part of the Erik Prince led Frontier Resource Group.

He is also actively developing (co-owner and President, American Industrial Group Inc.) a manufacturing company in the US that provides sustainable disinfectant and other personal protective equipment in the current COVID-19 pandemic.

Since January 2019, Artemenko has been serving as Executive Chairman of Global Management Association Corporation which has been registered in the US lobbyist register, according to data of the US Department of Justice, in compliance with FARA law.

His IT company (owner and President, AlphaNet Technologies, Inc.), which previously successfully pioneered the online educational project Eduboard.com, in cooperation with ZAKA is working on implementing the blockchain based COVID-19 immunity passport project (NewNorm) - to enable people to prove their COVID-19 health status to institutions without compromising their privacy.

== Family and personal life ==
His parents: Viktor Andreevich Artemenko and Olga Alexandrovna Artemenko are professors. In 2006, Viktor Artemenko became an advisor to Valeria Matyukha.

Andrii Artemenko is married to famous Ukrainian model Oksana Ostapivna Kuchma who is 22 years younger than Artemenko. He has four children and one grandchild. In 2017, he legally changed his name to Andy Victor Kuchma (his spouse's last name).

Andrii Artemenko voluntarily became a citizen of Canada in 2005 and lives permanently in Washington DC with his wife and children. Two of their children Edward and Amber are United States citizens and the third child Vitaly is a citizen of Canada.
