= Crests and colour of FC Dynamo Kyiv =

Uniform of a football club in Ukraine

Throughout its history, FC Dynamo Kyiv has traditionally played in blue-white uniforms, with a short exception during the final years of Soviet period, when the club performed in the national colours of Ukraine. All emblems historically used by Dynamo are based on the logo of the eponymous sports society.

== Crest ==
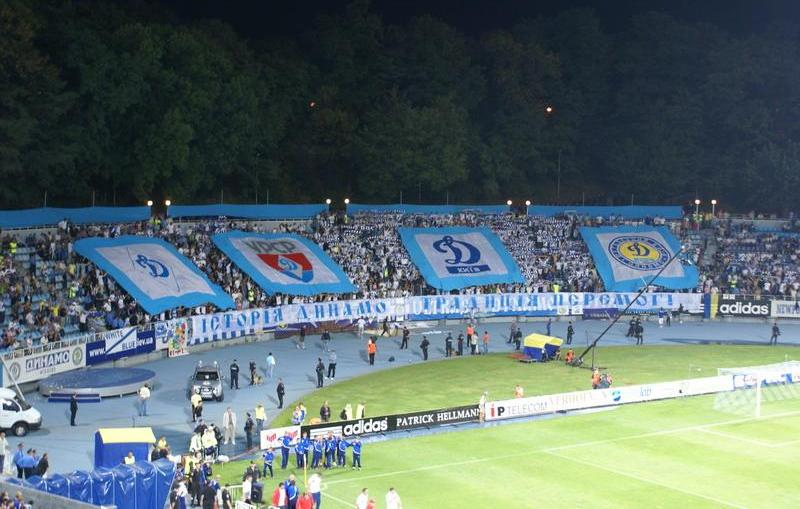
Dynamo's historical emblems displayed at the club's home stadium

Being a member of the All-Union Sports Society Dynamo, the Dynamo football team of Kyiv adopted the same emblem of the Dynamo's sports society as its first logo, which featured on their shirts since 1927 and was a cursive blue Cyrillic letter "Д" (D) in a vertical rhombus. Similar emblem existed in other Soviet football teams throughout the Soviet Union such as FC Dynamo Moscow, FC Dinamo Tbilisi, FC Dinamo Minsk, and others. The idea of symbol is attributed to a native of Ukraine Leonid Nedolya-Honcharenko who at that time served as a chief of political department of the OGPU troops in Moscow District.

The symbol the club obtained on franchise rights from the Ukrainian Fitness and Sports Society "Dynamo" (see Dynamo–Ukraine). Over the years, the club's logo has undergone many changes and replacements, but the cursive "D" has remained ever since.

In 2003 after Dynamo won their 10th domestic trophy, a golden star was added at the top of the logo to celebrate the club's success. The second star was added to the logo in 2007 during celebrations of Dynamo's 80-year anniversary. Although Dynamo has won only 15 Ukrainian league titles, their 13 titles as USSR Champions were taken into account.

== Colours ==
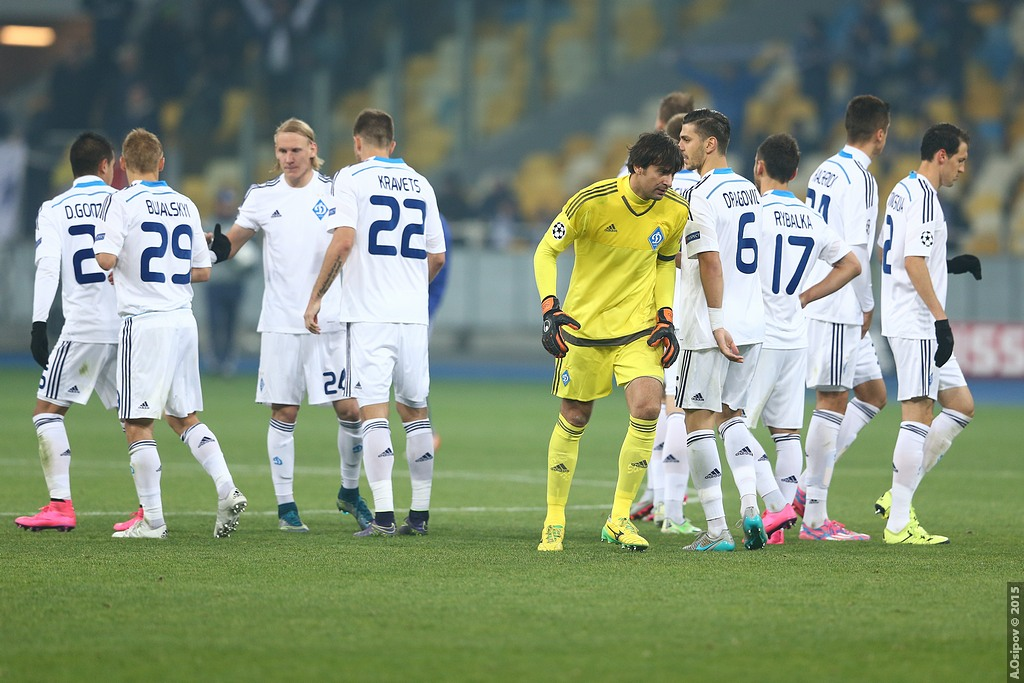
Dynamo players wearing their 2015/16 kit

Dynamo's traditional colours are white and dark blue, with white being the predominant colour. Throughout their history the club has usually played in a white shirt and blue shorts. This was changed in 1961 when a blue sash was added to the kit; it was removed soon afterwards. In 2004, the club's management decided to restore the famous sash as a talisman. It was added to the away kit and remained there until the beginning of the 2008–09 season, when it was replaced by a white kit with a shirt having thin blue vertical stripes, the first time in over 50 years that a club had worn such a pattern.

During the last two seasons before the breakup of the Soviet Union, Dynamo's kit was similar to Metalist, yellow shirts and blue shorts. This color scheme carried a symbolic meaning, representing the national colours of the yet-not-adopted Ukraine national flag. In the 1990 Soviet Cup Final, the yellow-blue Dynamo team thrashed the all-Red Lokomotiv 6–1 at Luzhniki Stadium. In the early years of Ukrainian independence, the club swapped their yellow colour for white. However blue remained one of Dynamo's colours and is still a main colour of the club's away kit.

The club's current sponsors, New Balance and ABank24, feature on the team shirt. New Balance is also the manufacturer of the kit. Among former sponsors there were Ostchem Holding, Nadra Bank, PrivatBank, Prominvestbank, Ukrtelecom, and others.

=== Historical kits ===
Period	Kit manufacturer	Shirt sponsor	First kit	Second kit	Third kit	Goalkeeper
1927–1935	—	—				
1936–1947	—	—				
1947–1950	—	—				
1951–1959	—	—				
1960–1961	—	—				
1962	—	—				
1963	—	—				
1966	—	—				
1967	—	—				
1968–1969	—	—				
1970	—	—				
1971–1972	—	—				
1973–1974	—	—				
1975	Adidas	—				
1976–1977	Adidas	—				
1978–1979	Adidas	—				
1980	Adidas	—				
1981	Adidas	—				
1982	Adidas	—				
1983–1984	Adidas	—				
1985	Adidas	—				
1986	Adidas	—				
1987	Adidas	Commodore				
1987–1988	Adidas	OCRIM				
1988–1989	Adidas	—				
1989	Duarig	FISAC Como				
1989–1990	Admiral	FISAC				
1990–1991	Admiral	Lufthansa				
1992–1994	Umbro	Lufthansa				
1994–1996	Umbro	—				
1996–1997	Adidas	Prominvestbank				
1997–1998	Adidas	Prominvestbank				
1998–1999	Adidas	Prominvestbank				
1999–2000	Adidas	Prominvestbank				
2000-2001	Adidas	Prominvestbank				
2001-2002	Adidas	Prominvestbank				
2002-2003	Adidas	Prominvestbank				
2003-2004	Adidas	Prominvestbank				
2004–2005	Adidas	EnergoHolding (Gazprom)				
2005–2006	Adidas	EnergoHolding (Gazprom)				
2006–2007	Adidas	Ukrtelekom				
2007–2008	Adidas	PrivatBank				
2008-2009	Adidas	PrivatBank				
2009–2010	Adidas	PrivatBank				
2010–2011	Adidas	PrivatBank				
2011–2012	Adidas	PrivatBank				
2012-2013	Adidas	PrivatBank				
2013–2014	Adidas	Nadra Bank				
2014–2015	Adidas	Nadra Bank				
2015–2016	Adidas	—				
2016–2017	Adidas	—				
2017–2018	Adidas	—				
2018–2019	New Balance	—				
2019–2020	New Balance	—				
2020–2021	New Balance	—				
2021–2022	New Balance	A-Bank				
2022–2023	New Balance	A-Bank				
2023–2024	New Balance	A-Bank				
2024–2025	New Balance	A-Bank				
2025–2026	New Balance	GGBET				
