= Alexander Levin =

Alexander Levin may refer to:

- Aleksandr Levin (1871–1929), Russian chess master
- Alexander (Aaron) Levin (born 1968), Ukrainian American businessman, philanthropist and president of Kyiv Jewish Community
