= KDD Group =

Ukrainian real estate development company

KDD Ukraine
- Formerly: Kyiv-Donbas; KDD Group; KDD Engineering
- Type: Public (LSE: KDDG)
- Industry: Real estate
- Founded: February 7, 1993; 33 years ago (Kyiv-Donbas); 2004; 22 years ago (KDD Group); 2016; 10 years ago (KDD Ukraine)
- Founders: Mikhail Grinshpon
- Defunct: 2016 (KDD Group)
- Headquarters: Arsenal'na Square, 1-B, Kyiv, Ukraine
- Key people: Oleksandr Levin; Vyacheslav Konstantinovsky; Oleksandr Konstantinovsky
- Revenue: ▼€0.3 million
- Net income: ▼€24.2 million
- Total assets: ▲€389 million
- Total equity: ▲€255.3 million
- Number of employees: 139 (December, 2010) (2010)
- Website: kdd.ua

KDD Group (Kyiv Donbas Development) is a Ukrainian real estate development company founded in 1993 and registered in the Netherlands. The company was liquidated in 2016 leaving its half-built Sky Towers mixed-use development in Kyiv unfinished. Soon after the company resumed its operation as KDD Ukraine.

== History ==
The company, formerly known as the private joint-stock company "Kiev-Donbass", was founded by Mikhail Grinshpon. Grinshpon headed Kyiv-Donbas until around 1997. Viktor Topolov was also one of the co-founders. The company was engaged in the sale of coal and equipment for Ukrainian mines. Leonid Roytman acted as vice-president of Kyiv-Donbas. Later, Oleg Asmakov became one of the company's major shareholders. In 1999, Asmakov was murdered in Kyiv..

The Kyiv-Donbas holding was also one of the founders of Nadra Bank in 1993.

In 2011, Andriy Verevskyi bought 68.2% of the shares in KDD Group.

== Projects ==
=== Completed ===
Name	Use	Completed	City	Picture
Kyiv-Donbas	office	1997	Kyiv	
Vvedynskyi	residential	2003	Kyiv	
Diplomat Hall	residential	2005	Kyiv	
Botanic Towers	mixed-use	2006	Kyiv	
Kureni	restaurant	2007	Kyiv	
PecherSKY	residential	2013	Kyiv	
DOMA Center	retail	2014	Kyiv	
Novus	retail	2016	Kyiv	
Terminal Food	restaurant	2017	Kyiv	
Standard One VDNG	residential	2019	Kyiv	
Black One	office	2021	Kyiv	

=== Under Construction ===
Name	Use	City	Picture
Standard One Terminal	residential	Kyiv	
NUVO	office	Kyiv	
Standard One Obolon	residential	Kyiv	
Standard One Pozniaky	residential	Kyiv	

=== Cancelled ===
Name	Use	City	Picture
World Trade Center Kyiv	office	Kyiv	
Metro City	residential	Kyiv	
Sky Towers	office	Kyiv	
Zazymia	hotel	Zazymia	
Centro	retail	Kyiv	
Diplomat Park	residential	Lviv	
Standard One Darnytsia	residential	Kyiv	
