= Omelchenko =

Omelchenko is a surname of Ukrainian origin.

It may refer to:

- Aleksandr Omelchenko, Russian footballer
- Andriy Omelchenko, Ukrainian bandurist
- Igor Omelchenko, Soviet swimmer
- Oleksandr Omelchenko, former mayor of Kyiv
- Oleksiy Omel'chenko, Ukrainian footballer
- Valeriy Omelchenko, Ukrainian politician
- Hryhoriy Omelchenko, Ukrainian politician
