= Vyacheslav Konstantinovsky =

Ukrainian businessman and politician

- Вячеслав Константіновський
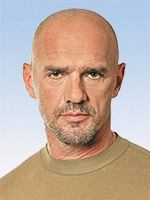
- Official Verkhovna Rada portrait, 2014

People's Deputy of Ukraine
- In office 5 November 2014 – 13 July 2017
- Preceded by: Oleksandr Chornovolenko
- Succeeded by: Hanna Bondar (2019)
- Constituency: Kyiv, No. 220

Personal details
- Born: 11 November 1960 (age 65) Kyiv, Ukrainian SSR, Soviet Union
- Party: People's Front (2014–2017)
- Education: National University of Ukraine on Physical Education and Sport

Military service
- Allegiance: Ukraine
- Unit: Kyiv-1 Police Battalion
- Battles/wars: Russo-Ukrainian War; War in Donbas

Vyacheslav Leonidovych Konstantinovsky (Ukrainian: Вячеслав Леонідович Константіновський; born 11 November 1960) is a Ukrainian businessman and politician who served as a People's Deputy of Ukraine from Ukraine's 220th electoral district from 2014 until his resignation in 2017.

== Early life, business and military career ==
Vyacheslav Leonidovych Konstantinovsky was born in Kyiv. In childhood he was engaged in classical wrestling and held the rank of Master of Sports. He has a twin brother, Alexander. He entered the catering business in the mid-1980s. In the late 1980s, Vyacheslav and Alexander Konstantinovsky emigrated from Soviet Union to Israel under the country's repatriation program. He lived in the United States for seven years and then return in Ukraine in 1997. Later he took part in the Orange Revolution and Euromaidan.

Russian mafia figures Leonid "Lenya Long" Roytman and Monya Elson were convicted in the United States in 2006 for their involvement in a plot to murder Vyacheslav Konstantinovsky. After release from prison in 2014, Leonid Roytman publicly accused Vyacheslav Konstantinovsky of involvement in several murders in USA and Ukraine and alleged that he had acted as a hitman. Photographs subsequently surfaced showing Vyacheslav Konstantinovsky together with Leonid Roytman, with both being identified in accompanying reports as members of Alik Magadan's (real name Oleg Asmakov) criminal gang. In an FBI report, Konstantinovsky is identified as a member of certain American gang.

He and his brother own the Kyiv Donbas Development Group,, Puzata Hata and Carte Blanche restaurant networks. In 2013, their fortune was estimated at $355 million.

In 2014, following the beginning of the War in Donbas, Konstantinovsky joined the Kyiv-1 Police Battalion. In summer 2014, he announced that he was selling his Rolls-Royce Phantom to donate the money to the Ukrainian army. On August 8, Konstantinovsky announced that he had received $180000 for the car, which he donated to the Army’s cause against the separatist movement in eastern Ukraine.

== Political career ==
In September 2014, he announced to run for the Verkhovna Rada (Ukrainian parliament). In early parliamentary elections on 26 October, he won in Ukraine's 220th electoral district, gaining almost 33% of the vote.

On 17 June 2015, Konstantinovsky left the People's Front parliamentary faction.

On 13 July 2017, Vyacheslav Konstantinovsky wrote a statement to renounce his deputy mandate. On his Facebook page, he posted that three years in parliament were the darkest of his life. Konstantinovsky plans to continue doing business.

=== Income ===
According to an electronic declaration for 2015, Konstantinovsky was the wealthiest member of the Verkhovna Rada. He declared $14.7 million, €500,000, and ₴6,778,776 in cash.

The deputy had two land plots in the Kyiv region (with 1500 m² and 647 m²), a house with an area of 649 m², an apartment of 84.4 m² and four garages.

Konstantinovsky owned Land Rover Sport (2012), a 2002 Harley-Davidson V-Rod muscle, a Toyota Highlander (2016). He also indicated six Rolex watches and a gun among the valuable property.

=== Philanthropy ===
- He and his brother were producers of "Orange love" (2005), the first Ukrainian movie about Orange Revolution.
- On the end of February 2014, brothers transformed their restaurant Kureni into base of volunteer rapid response unit (70 persons) to maintain peace and order in Kyiv. Later this squad acted near Slovyansk under the command of SBU.
- He donated $50000 to Nataliya Yusupova, who helped Kyiv military hospital after selling Rolls-Royce in 2014. Other money millionaire spent on military equipment for Kyiv-1, one of Territorial defense battalions (Ukraine).

== Personal life ==
Konstantinovsky is married to top model Yuliana Dementieva. They have two children: daughter Stefania and son Maximilian Konstantinovsky, who is a United States citizen.
