= Hanna Bondar =

Ukrainian architect and politician (born 1975)

- Ганна Бондар
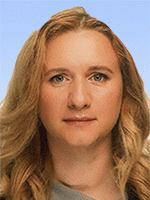
- Official portrait, 2019

People's Deputy of Ukraine
- Incumbent
- Assumed office 29 August 2019
- Preceded by: Vyacheslav Konstantinovsky (2017)
- Constituency: Kyiv, No. 220

Personal details
- Born: 23 February 1975 (age 51) Kyiv, Ukrainian SSR, Soviet Union (now Ukraine)
- Party: Servant of the People
- Education: National Academy of Visual Arts and Architecture; Kyiv National University of Construction and Architecture; Lviv Polytechnic

Hanna Viacheslavivna Bondar (Ukrainian: Га́нна Вячесла́вівна Бо́ндар; born 23 February 1975) is a Ukrainian architect and politician currently serving as a People's Deputy of Ukraine from Ukraine's 220th electoral district. Prior to her election, she was acting chief architect of Kyiv and director of the Department of Urban Planning and Architecture of the Kyiv City State Administration from October 2015 to 4 April 2016.

== Early life and education ==
Hanna Bondar was born in a family of architects on 23 February 1975 in Kyiv. She graduated from school No. 25 in Kyiv. In 1997, Bondar graduated from the Faculty of Theory and History of Art of the National Academy of Visual Arts and Architecture in Kyiv. In 2011, she graduated from the Faculty of Architecture of the Kyiv National University of Construction and Architecture and received a bachelor's degree. In 2012, she graduated from the Lviv Polytechnic.

Bondar worked as an architect and advertiser. From 2011 to 2012, she headed the street space renovation department of the Institute of General Planning of Kyiv. From 2012 to 2015, she was the Head of the Urban Cadastre Service of the Department of Urban Planning and Architecture of the Kyiv City State Administration.

Bondar supervised architectural competitions. She curated the first festival of urban projects in Kyiv, "PRO misto," a competition of the memorial of the Heavenly Hundred "Territory of Dignity", reconstruction of the Square of Contracts.

In October 2015 Bondar was appointed acting chief architect of the city and director of the Department of Urban Planning and Architecture of the Kyiv City State Administration. Subsequently, she became General Director of the Directorate of Technical Regulation in Construction of the Ministry of Regional Development, Construction and Housing and Communal Services of Ukraine.

== Political career ==
In the 2019 Ukrainian parliamentary election Bondar was nominated as the candidate of the Servant of the People party from Ukraine's 220th electoral district, located in Kyiv's Podilskyi District. She won the election, gathering 37.2% of the vote.

In the Verkhovna Rada (Ukrainian parliament), Bondar joined Committee on the Organisation of State Power, Local Self-Government, Regional Development, and Urban Planning. She became the head of the Subcommittee on Urban Planning, Land Improvement, and Land Relations within Built-Up Areas. She is a member of the Permanent Delegation in the Parliamentary Dimension of the Central European Initiative.

In 2020, Bondar and Opposition Platform — For Life deputy Oleksandr Lukashev came to the High Anti-Corruption Court to plead for the former chief architect of Kyiv, Serhiy Tselovalynyk, who the National Anti-Corruption Bureau of Ukraine accused of causing 9.3 million hryvnias of damage to Kyiv.

== Controversies ==
In 2014, Bondar submitted a paper declaration for 2014 to pass the inspection for the lustration in the Kyiv City State Administration department, she did not declare her car. Also, Bondar did not indicate that she or her family members own any real estate, although she wrote that she lives in a building on Petropavlivska Street in Kyiv. However, the electronic declaration for 2015 shows that Bondar has owned the car since 2009.

In 2016, she submitted documents with signs of forgery to the commission for holding a competition for the position of chief architect of the city of Kyiv. The mass media called Bondar a puppet of Andrii Vavrysh, the former deputy head of the Department of Architecture and Urban Planning of the KMDA. Vitali Klitschko, mayor of Kyiv, later dismissed Vavrysh on suspicion of covering up corruption. Together with Bondar, they "pulled through" several development programmes through illegitimate tenders.

== Personal life ==
Hanna Bondar is married and is raising a daughter born in 1997 and two sons born in 2008 and 2013. Her daughter Sofia is studying in her first year at the Faculty of Architecture.

== Works ==
- "Architectural and Territorial Development Contests: Democracy in Action" (Art book, 2017, Kyiv);
- "Urban wind. Tales of a Kyivan Woman" (VARTO, 2019, Kyiv);
- "73 Strange Traps from the Life of the Architect Shchedrykov" feuilleton collection (CANactions, 2020, Kyiv) Translated from Russian by Artem Polezhaka.
