= Victory Monument in Netanya =

Monument in Netanya, Israel

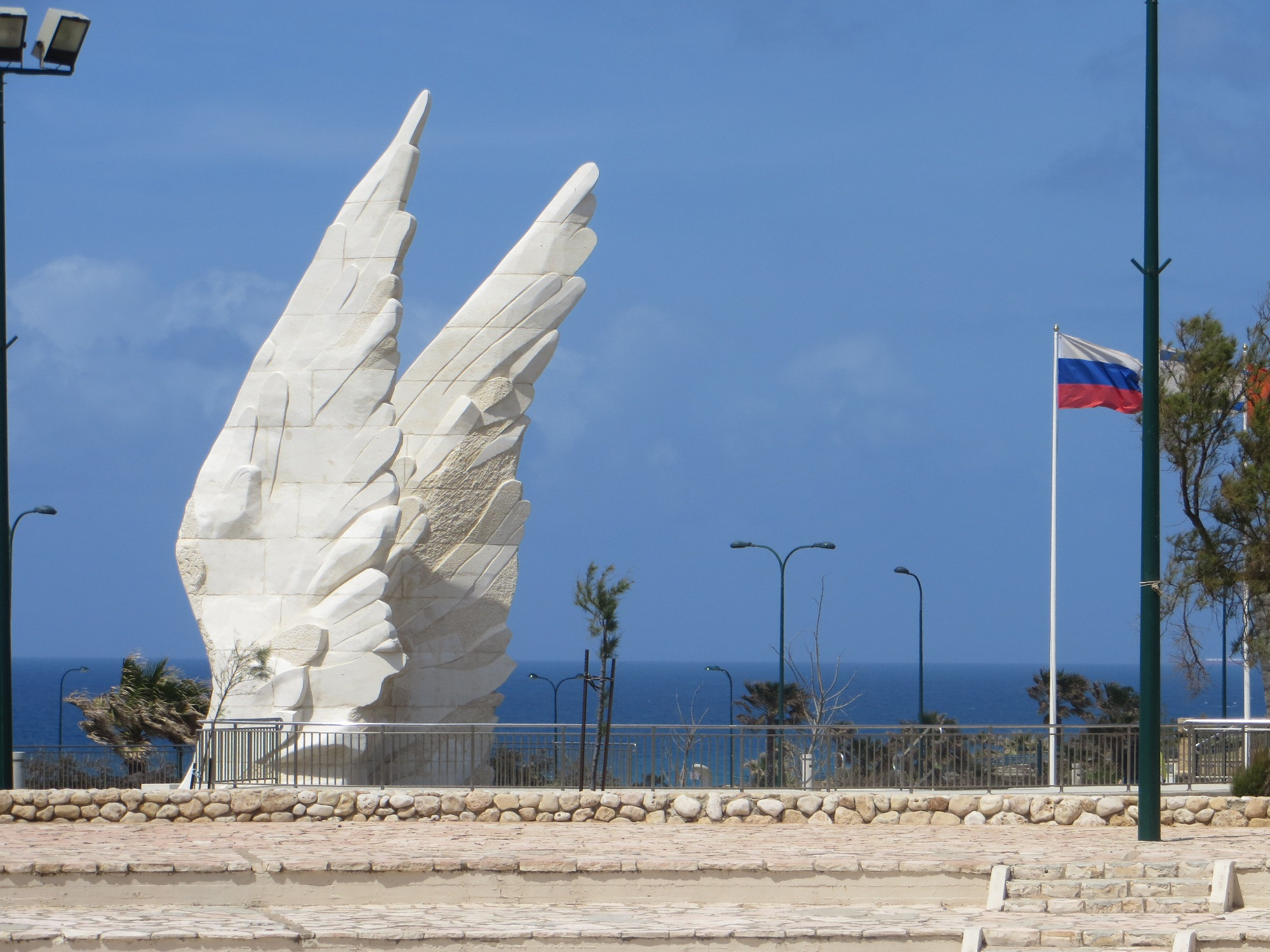
The Victory Monument in Netanya

The Victory Monument in Netanya is a memorial marking the Red Army's victory over Nazi Germany in World War II. The monument was erected by a decision of the Government of Israel with the consent of the Russian government. It was unveiled in a 2012 ceremony at the site attended by Vladimir Putin and Benjamin Netanyahu, after having been first proposed by Prime Minister Netanyahu on a trip to Moscow in February 2010. It is one of the most prominent features in the city of Netanya.

== The Monument ==
The memorial consists of two elements which symbolize the transition from darkness to light reflecting "the Soviet military victory to stop the Holocaust of the Jewish people", followed by the establishment of the Jewish state in Israel. The memorial is designed as a maze, in which key tragic events in the history of the Jewish people during the Holocaust are depicted in reliefs.

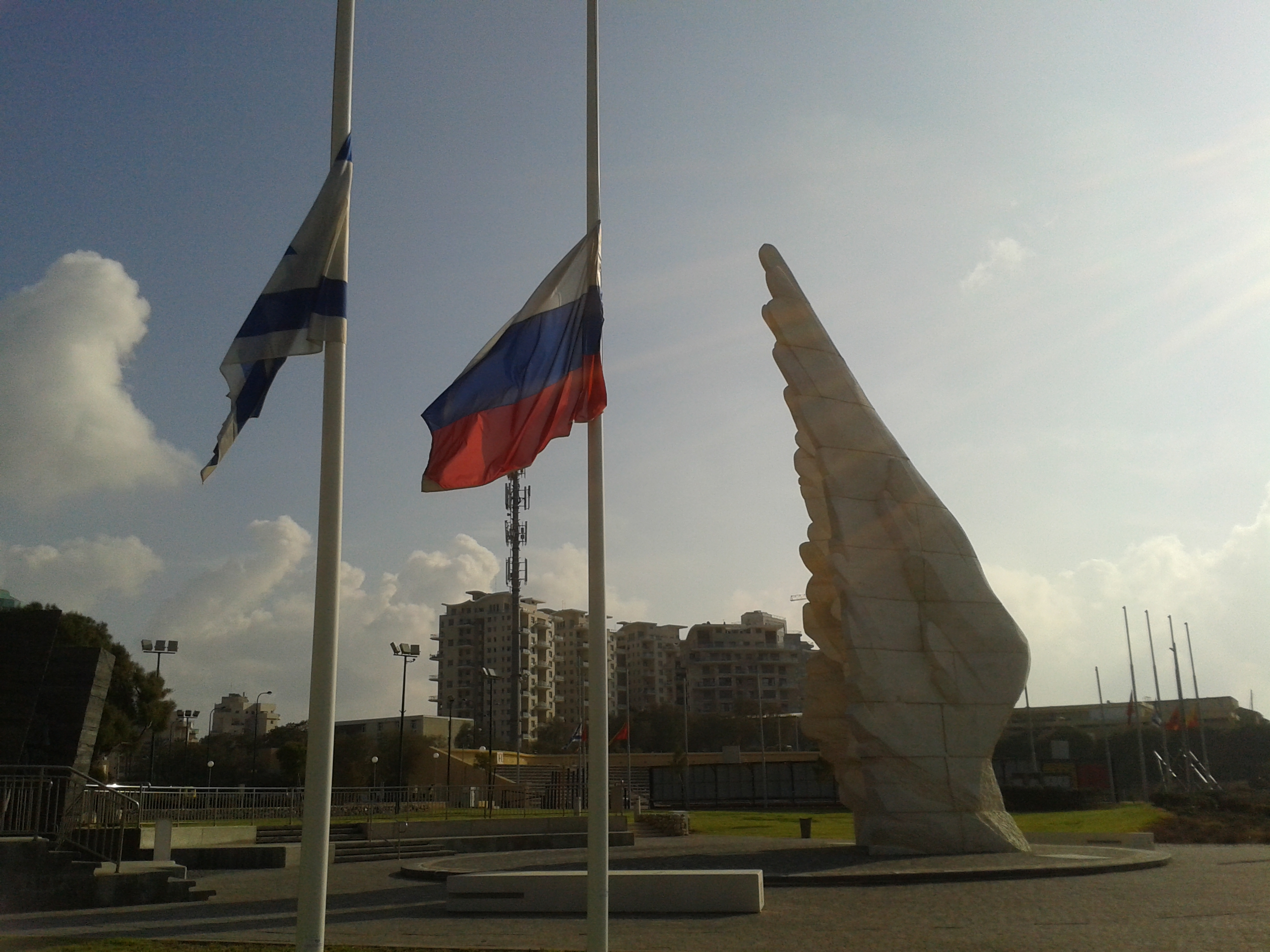
The Victory Monument

A representation of the Second World War is contained in black bunker. On the right describes the Holocaust, and on the left describes the war between Nazi Germany and the Soviet Union. At the end of the maze - the emergence into the light and open air, where white wings soar to the heavens as a symbol of victory, hope and peace, against the backdrop of Netanya's coastline.

== Funding ==
The monument was inaugurated at an official ceremony on 25 June 2012 with the participation of Russian President Vladimir Putin. A number of Russian billionaires and Jewish philanthropists, including Mikhail Fridman, Boris Mints, and German Khan donated to create the memorial, in conjunction with efforts made by Keren Hayesod, the Russian Jewish Congress, the World Forum of Russian-Speaking Jewry, and United Israel Appeal. Yury Kanner, who heads the RJC, along with other state officials from both nations and Jewish leaders from around the globe, attended the memorial’s opening.
