= World Forum of Russian-Speaking Jewry =

International non-profit organisation

World Forum Of Russian-Speaking Jewry (Russian: Всемирный форум русскоязычного еврейства) — is an international, nonprofit, nongovernmental organization that brings together dozens of diaspora communities and structures of Russian-speaking Jews living in Israel, Canada, the U.S., the European Union and the former USSR.

== History of creation ==
Proclamation of the World Forum of Russian-speaking Jewry (WFRJ) creating was held on January 25, 2012, in New York City at the UN headquarters. Within the framework of the international conference dedicated to the International Day of the Holocaust and the 70th anniversary of the tragedy at Babi Yar, Alexander (Aaron) Levin, who was elected as the organization president the day before, announced the creation of WFRE by combining Russian-speaking Jews of all countries and continents. The event was attended by over 700 people. Ceremony was conducted by the American Organization Forum of Russian-speaking Jewry with the assistance of permanent missions of Israel and Ukraine in the United Nations.

== Mission ==
The mission of the organization is to promote prosperity and security, economic, cultural and spiritual development of the state of Israel consolidating the communities of Russian-speaking Jews immigrated to Canada, United States, Germany and other countries, as well as repatriated from the former USSR.

Projects implemented by the organization aim to maintain links between the independent state of Israel and the Russian-speaking Jewish Diaspora.

== Activities ==
=== Perpetuate the memory of the Holocaust ===
The Holocaust is the key issue of the expository and educational activities of the organization. With the support of the WFRJ the memorial complex "Babi Yar" project was developed. On the October 3, 2011 the ceremony of the stone laying for the construction of the museum was held. The Chairman of the Fund Supervisory Board and President of the WFRJ Alexander (Aaron) Levin will oversee the construction performing by the "Memory of Babi Yar Foundation". The project aims to recreate the atmosphere of the war using special effects.

=== Victory Monument in Netanya ===
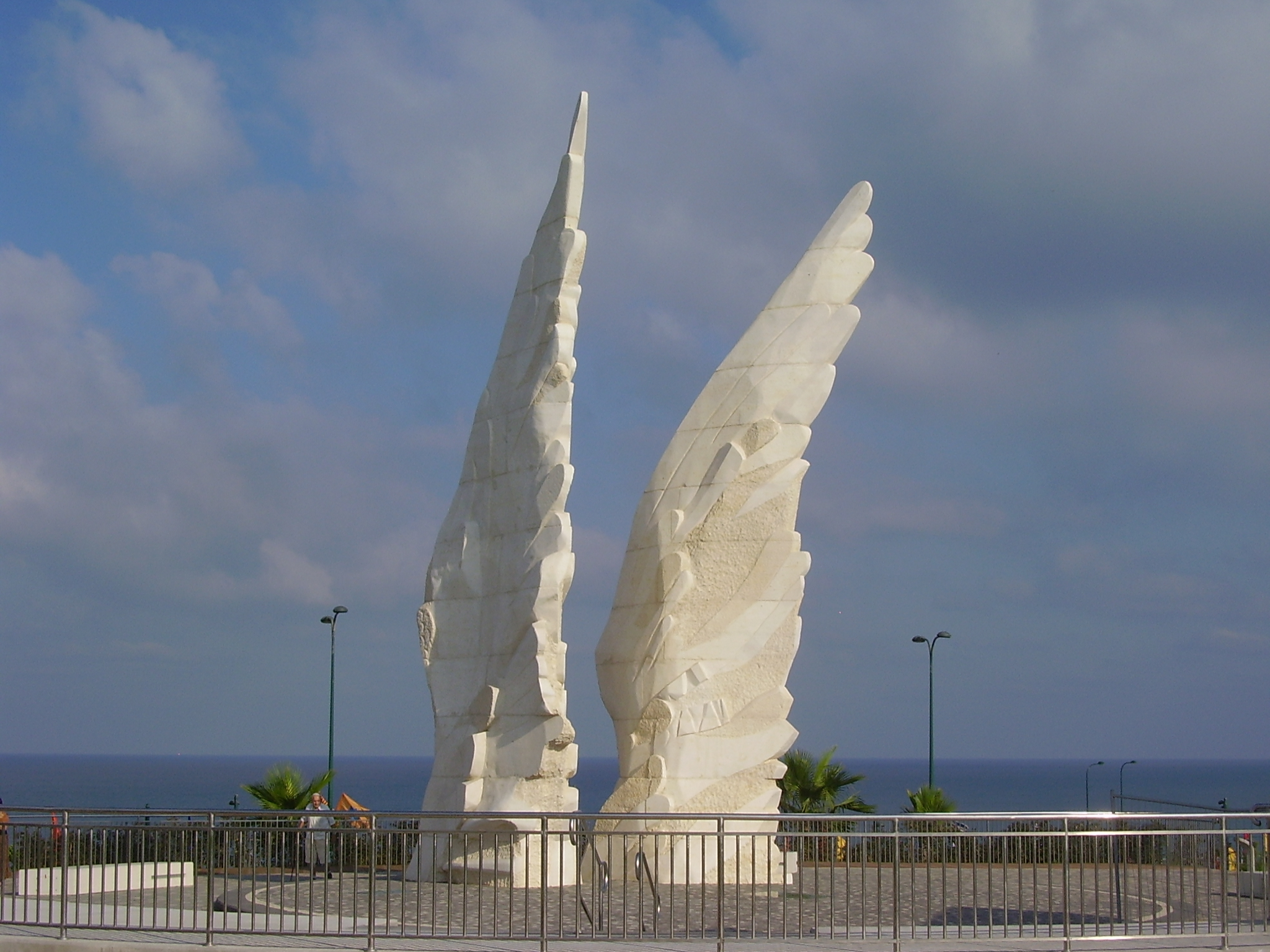
Victory Monument in Netanya

WFRJ acted as the main partner of the Israeli National Fund named "Keren Hayesod" and the Israeli government in creating the Victory Monument in Netanya (Israel). The memorial consists of two sculptures. The first part is a black tank symbolizing the Jewish Holocaust and the Red Army fighting against Nazi Germany. The second one is the white wings, symbolizing the victory, hope and memory. Inauguration of the memorial was held on the June 25, 2012.

=== Help for the Jewish communities ===
WFRJ provides large families and children in need of Jewish communities in Israel with the food support. It is possible due to the cooperation agreements with the supermarkets of redeeming the coupons of different denominations, prepaid by the organization. Under the auspices of the WFRJ the Jewish community of Kyiv laid the cornerstone of the future Jewish community center, which is to become the largest in Ukraine on the April 25, 2012. The stone was brought from very Jerusalem, and into the foundation of the building a capsule with a message for posterity was placed. WFRJ headed by Alexander Levin has initiated the construction of a synagogue in the Lubavitcher center in Kensington (Brooklyn). The first stone was solemnly laid in February 2012.

=== Help for the soldiers ===
The project entitled "Our warm house" created by the WFRJ and fully funded by it, involves the provision of comprehensive care for the lone soldiers repatriated from the former USSR and serving in the Israel Defense Forces (IDF). Thanks to the project those soldiers can spend their own free time at "home" because the WFRJ provides apartments with full comfort. Each apartment is served by the woman who takes care of the order, erases and cooks. A manager also the helps the in solving his routine problems.

During the "cloud pillar" operation (14–21 November 2012) WFRJ donated 140,000 dollars to assist lonely soldiers who was repatriated from the former USSR. Another 30 thousand dollars has been allocated by the organization to install the necessary equipment and shelters in areas where there are not enough shelters from rocket attacks. The WFRJ charity events were coordinated by the Israeli National Fund named "Keren Hayesod" and the Israeli government. By the end of the year 2012 the organization collected over 50 thousand dollars among New Yorkers to repair shelters located in southern Israel.

=== Other projects ===
WFRJ gives the great attention to the fight against anti-Semitism. On the March 25, 2012 in the United States was established the "Children's Self-Defense" project aimed to educate Jewish children self-advocacy skills and the ability to rebut the anti-Semites. Presentation of the athletic program was held in New York City ‘KingsBay Y’ Jewish center. On the June 3, 2012 within the framework of the nationwide "Salute to Israel" march in the United States WFRJ organized a column of 1500 Russian-speaking Jews. In January 2012 the European division of the WFRJ started funding the project of "Ir David" archaeological excavations in Jerusalem and the restoration project on Mount Masada. On the February 22, 2012 under the auspices of WFRJ the Association of Russian-speaking rabbis of Israel was created.
