= Alexander (Aaron) Levin =

Ukrainian businessman

- Олександр (Аарон) Левін
- Born: April 1, 1968 (age 58); Odesa, Ukrainian SSR, Soviet Union (now Ukraine)
- Occupations: Businessman and Jewish community leader

Alexander (Aaron) Levin (Note: Ukrainian: Олександр (Аарон) Леонідович Левін, romanized: Oleksandr (Aaron) Leonidovych Levin) (born April 1, 1968) is a businessman and president of a Jewish Community in Kyiv , founding president of the World Forum of Russian-Speaking Jewry and a leader of the US Russian-speaking community.

== Life ==
Levin was born in Odesa, Ukraine to a Jewish family. In 1988 Levin emigrated to America, becoming a U.S. citizen in 1993. In 1994 Alexander Levin returned to Ukraine, where he got involved in the real estate development sector. He is a board member of the Ukrainian Construction Association (UCA). In 2007, Levin with his partners organized the largest real estate development group in Kyiv – KDD Group NV – and became the chairman of the board of directors. As of December 2011 Levin owned 22.63% of KDD Group NV. In June 2010, he became head of a Kyiv Jewish religious community, Brodsky Choral Synagogue. Levin is president of the board of the Babi Yar Memorial Fund.

He is the founding president of the World Forum of Russian-Speaking Jewry, an international organization promoting ties between Russian-speaking Jews and the State of Israel. On behalf of the 3 million Russian-speaking Jews all over the world, with Russia and the US being major diasporas, Levin has been invited as a key speaker to such high-profile events as the Israeli Presidential Conference Facing Tomorrow 2013 and at a ceremony commemorating International Holocaust Remembrance Day 2012 at the United Nations In May 2012, Alexander (Aaron) Levin was elected as president of the "Keren Hayesod" (Israel National Fund in Ukraine), and in 2013 in Jerusalem Levin received Chabad Man of the Year Award.
