= Viktor Topolov =

Ukrainian politician, bank director and engineer (born 1945)

- Віктор Тополов
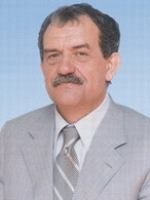

6th Minister of Coal Industry of Ukraine
- In office 18 August 2005 – 4 August 2006
- Prime Minister: Yulia Tymoshenko; Yuriy Yekhanurov
- Preceded by: Serhiy Tulub
- Succeeded by: Serhiy Tulub

Personal details
- Born: December 21, 1945 (age 80) Agapovka, Chelyabinsk Oblast, Russian SFSR
- Party: United Centre
- Other political affiliations: Our Ukraine
- Education: Komunarsk Mining and Metallurgical Institute (1973)
- Occupation: Politician, government official

Viktor Semenovych Topolov (Ukrainian: Віктор Семенович Тополов) is a Ukrainian politician, bank director and head mining engineer.

Topolov is suspected by the FBI in late 1990s money-laundering and fraud. He also was known to be associated with Alex Oronov. Topolov also used services of three executives the FBI have described as members of a violent Russian organized-crime network: one, a mob enforcer closely associated with Semion Mogilevich, the powerful organized crime boss.

Topolov was a president of Ukrainian football club. In 2006 along with Alex Oronov, Topolov co-owned an ethanol company. Through his partner and investments from Morgan Stanley, he wanted to build a factory in Ukraine. Topolov ran a conglomerate "Kyiv-Donbas". Law officers say there was evidence Topolov transferred phony player contracts to shell companies and directed CSKA Kyiv to pay them. In late 2012 in interview to Forbes Ukraine, Topolov said that his venture "Kyiv-Donbas" was not totally official and one day he will write a book about it.

The Mogilevich's hitman Leonid Roytman who spent sometime in the United States prison worked as vice president in Kyiv-Donbas in the late 1990s. Vyacheslav (Slava) and Oleksandr (Alex) Konstantinovsky (known as Karamazov Brothers) also were employed for Kyiv-Donbas and to this day hold Ukrainian fast-food network "Puzata Hata" that is part of "Kyiv-Donbas" business.

== See also ==
- FC Arsenal Kyiv (CSKA Kyiv), Andrey Artemenko
