= 2000 Brovary disaster =

Military accident in Kyiv Oblast, Ukraine

Coordinates: 50°30′45.4″N 30°47′32.9″E

Brovary disaster
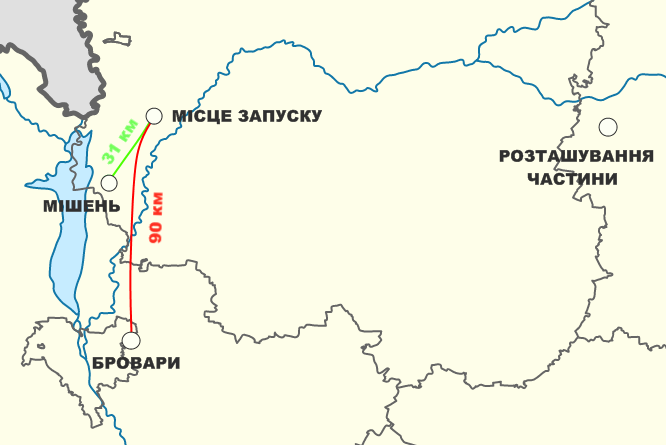
- Planned and actual flight trajectory of the Tochka-U missile launched on 20 April 2000
- Date: 20 April 2000
- Time: 15:11 (UTC+3)
- Location: Brovary, Kyiv Oblast, Ukraine
- Type: Accidental man-made incident
- Cause: Failure of the power supply system, which led to loss of control of the Tochka-U missile, which struck a residential building
- Deaths: 3
- Injuries: 5

The Brovary disaster occurred on 20 April 2000 in the city of Brovary, Kyiv Oblast, when a training-combat surface-to-surface missile of the Tochka-U complex, launched from the Honcharivske training ground during military exercises, deviated from its planned course and, after flying 90 km, struck a nine-storey residential building. The missile did not have an explosive warhead; as a result of the missile strike, three people were killed and five others were wounded.

For four days after the disaster, until 23 April, the Ministry of Defence of Ukraine, led by Oleksandr Kuzmuk, refused to acknowledge that its missile had struck the residential building.

== Background ==
=== Missile ===
The Tochka-U missile launched at Brovary was partly a training missile: it had a training warhead with a live engine, which is why it lacked the self-destruct system that activates on course deviations; that system is present only in combat versions of the missile.

If a combat version of the missile had struck the building it hit and neighboring structures, little would have remained. The choice between a training and a combat missile was random; similar exercises had previously been conducted with combat versions of the Tochka-U.

The mobile system weighs 18 tonnes, and the missile itself 2 tonnes. The missile is 6.4 m long and 65 cm in diameter. Its flight altitude ranges from 6 to 26 km, and its range from 15 to 120 km. The warhead weight (or the weight of its training equivalent) is 480 kg. Its flight speed is 2,520 km/h.

In the USSR, the missile system was in service from the late 1980s and is still considered a high-precision weapon. Its storage life is 10 years, and its technical service life is 15 years.

The specific 9M79 missile that hit the building was manufactured on 6 July 1990 at the Votkinsk military plant in Soviet Russia. The missile brigade received it from a storage base on 14 April 2000.

Two and a half months remained before the manufacturer's warranty period expired. Before signing for receipt of the missile, it was checked for serviceability using an automated control and test machine "V9-819". On the 95th operation, the equipment detected a failure of the discrete-analog computing device—that is, the missile control system. Base personnel replaced the faulty unit within an hour. The missile was checked again, and no faults were found.

On 19 April it was loaded onto a transport vehicle and taken to the firing range. During the journey they stopped and checked the reliability of the mountings. At the range it was reloaded onto the launcher, and the crew chief, who took responsibility for the missile, checked it again on the launcher; the missile was serviceable.

=== Unit ===
The "unlucky" missile was launched by a crew of the 9K79 Tochka-U tactical missile system belonging to the 123rd Rocket Brigade, which was stationed in Konotop. Based on the results of a 1999 inspection, this missile brigade was recognized as the best in the Ground Forces of the Armed Forces of Ukraine.

=== Building ===
The building at 3 Nezalezhnosti Boulevard, built in 1975, was one of the first nine-storey buildings in Brovary. It was built of brick for workers of the Brovary powder metallurgy plant. The building was located 84 km from the Honcharivske training ground.

On the ground floor of the entrance hit by the missile were the Brovary passport office and, later, an office of the State Migration Service of Ukraine; fortunately, that office was not working on the day of the disaster.

The missile impact site was only 200 metres from the city centre – the modern Freedom Square – and 80 m from the Brovary City Council.

== Course of events ==
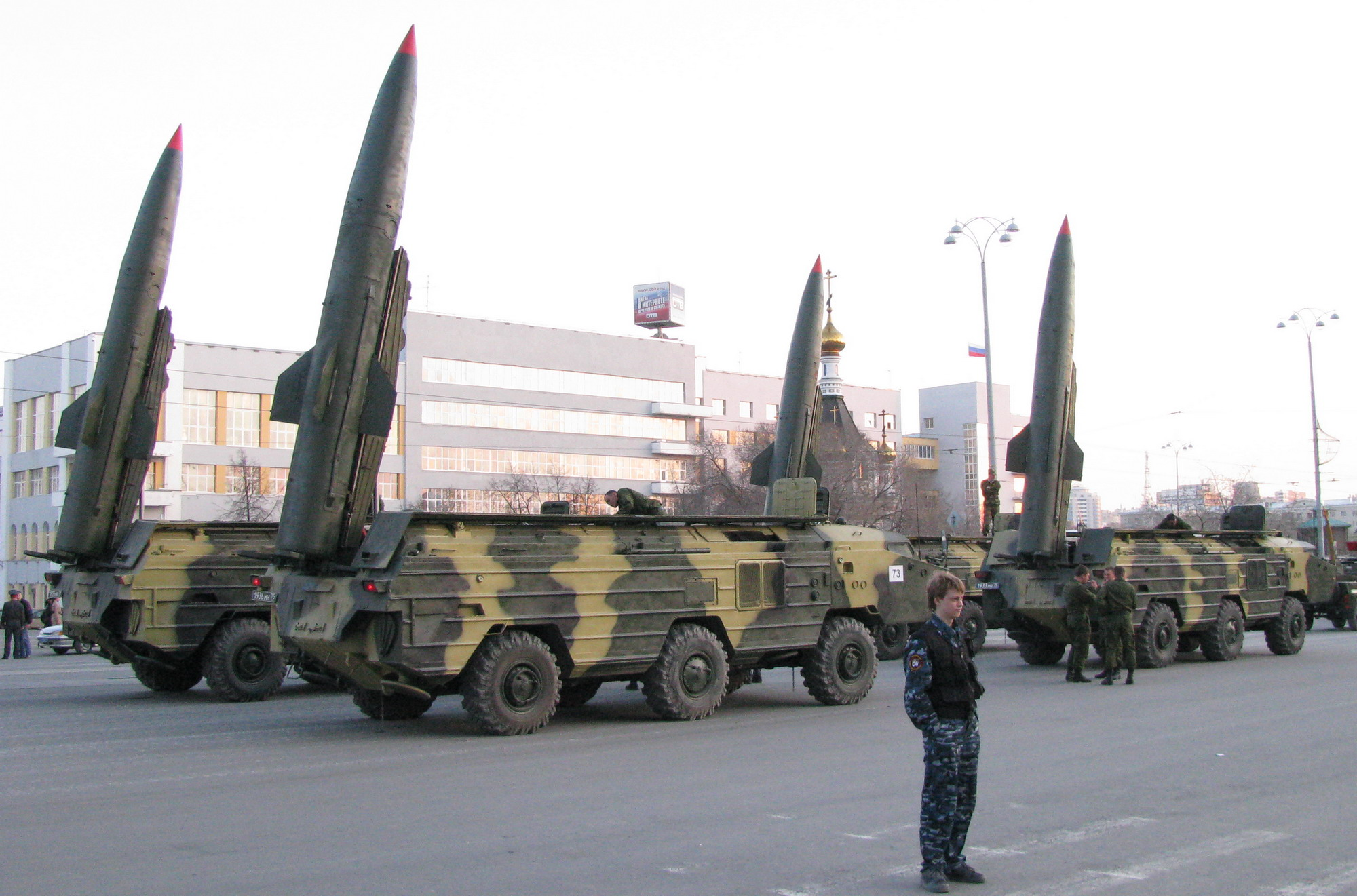
A Tochka-U missile, the type that hit Brovary

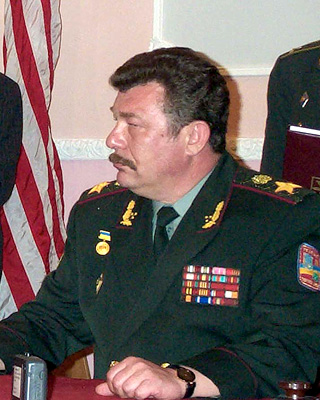
Oleksandr Kuzmuk – Minister of Defence during the Brovary tragedy

The planned exercises, which took place on 20 April 2000 at the Honcharivske training ground, involved 300 people and more than 70 vehicles. Eighteen firing units competed for the honour of taking part. Ordinary soldiers tried to get there in any role—even as cooks or support workers. The training ground was located 250 km from the unit's base, so to save money only 50 soldiers in 10 vehicles were able to go. Two Tochka-U missile launchers also went.

The 25-year-old senior lieutenant who commanded the launch was given the target coordinates on the spot. He entered them into the computer, and the machine made the subsequent calculations automatically. For safety, the calculation result was checked once more by a control group of the Main Directorate of Missile Troops and Artillery. The planned target was located 31 km from the launch site, at the Desna training ground.

The missile was launched at 15:05, and the launch was successful. Later, during the 12th second of flight, the military noticed an unusual small flash on the missile's body, but paid no attention to it. After that, the missile went off course and flew 90 km in the direction of Brovary.

After the missile launch, the firing crew had to leave the launch positions immediately. According to the exercise scenario, the launcher was practically unprotected and could have been hit by the enemy. Therefore, half an hour later, after carrying out technical work, the brigade immediately set off on the return march to Konotop. Also, before the march, the launch participants were presented with award watches; they were presented by the deputy commander of the Northern Operational Command.

At about 15:11, an explosion occurred in entrance no. 2 of the multi-storey building at 3 Nezalezhnosti Boulevard. The explosion damaged the 2nd to 9th floors. The other entrances did not suffer significant damage. The explosion was heard within a radius of 20 km, and in neighbouring buildings the shock wave blew out windows.

The source of the explosion was the impact of a Tochka-U missile on the building. It began its descent at an altitude of about 8 km, and its fall speed was about 2,500 km/h. When the missile hit the building, its weight was 1.1 tonnes. The force of the impact turned the missile into large fragments. A large round hole formed in the roof of the building and pierced through the entire entrance.

Militsiya and rescuers from the Ministry of Emergency Situations arrived at the scene at 15:16, four minutes after the call. They began clearing the rubble and searching for people underneath. The search and rescue operations were carried out by the Kyiv Civil Defence Brigade, consisting of 26 people, an emergency rescue detachment of the Ministry of Emergency Situations with 19 people, and 7 representatives of the operational rescue service of Kyiv, who arrived at the scene at 17:35.

Access to the entrance within a radius of 50 m was blocked. Berkut officers and police officers stood in the cordon. Apartment windows from the second to the ninth floor were shattered. The entire courtyard and, on the other side, all the open space up to 30 metres, as far as the roadway of the boulevard, were strewn with tiny glass fragments. On the trees near the building hung window curtains, blankets, and even one quilted blanket thrown out by the explosion. As a result of the tragedy, two women and one man died. Five people were taken to hospital with injuries of varying severity.

The preliminary assessment of the cause of the disaster by the Ministry of Internal Affairs was a deliberately prepared explosive device.

Immediately after the missile launch to the Desnianskyi training ground, a control group of the Main Directorate of the Ground Forces went to check whether the missile had hit the planned target. In the evening, when the troops had already returned from the exercises in Konotop, the control group reported that they had found missile fragments 8 metres from a reinforced concrete slab that served as the target. This is considered a very good result.

For the Tochka-U, a deviation from the target of up to 150 m is rated "excellent", up to 200 m "good", and up to 250 m "satisfactory". It later became known that these were fragments of missiles from old exercises.

== Reaction and investigation ==
Until 21 April, the Ministry of Defence of Ukraine ruled out the possibility that the explosion could have been caused by a missile launched during the exercises.

As stated by the head of the information group of the Ministry of Defence press service, Ihor Khalyavinskyi, commenting on reports from sources that the explosion could have been caused by a missile strike, on Thursday a single sanctioned missile launch was carried out in the Armed Forces of Ukraine at the Honcharivske training ground in Chernihiv Oblast, 130 km from Brovary:

The launch was carried out at 15:05, and at 15:07, 30 kilometres from the launch site, the missile hit the target. At the same time, a deviation from the centre of the target of 8 metres was recorded, which in this case, according to the standards, is considered an excellent indicator for the launch of such a powerful missile.

— Ihor Khalyavskyi, head of the information group of the Ministry of Defence press service, 21 April 2000

However, alongside this information, another was announced the same day:

One of the main versions of the cause of the explosion of the residential building in the city of Brovary, Kyiv Oblast, is the explosion of a missile that fell on the building. According to experts, the missile, having fallen on the building, broke through the floors from the 9th to the 2nd floor, where it exploded. The origin of the missile is unknown. The police believe that the cause of the explosion in the Brovary building was a planted explosive device.

— Interfax-Ukraine, 21 April 2000

Exactly 24 hours after the missile launch, at 15:07 on 21 April, the Minister of Defence Oleksandr Kuzmuk, who was at the Tarutyne training ground (Odesa Oblast), was informed for the first time that the cause of the tragedy in Brovary might have been the impact of a missile that fell vertically from a height of 8 km. The reason for the report was a plate found at the site with the code of the Tochka-U missile — "9M79".

=== 22 April ===
The version that the explosion in the entrance of the residential building in Brovary was caused by a surface-to-surface missile launched during exercises from the Honcharivske training ground in Chernihiv Oblast is confirmed, Interfax-Ukraine reports. However, conclusions about the cause of the explosion must be made by the investigative commission headed by the Deputy Minister of Internal Affairs of Ukraine.

If experts come to the final conclusion that the Ministry of Defence is to blame for the explosion, then the Ministry of Defence will be the first to acknowledge this.

— Ihor Khalyavskyi, head of the information group of the Ministry of Defence press service, 22 April 2000

=== 23 April ===
On Sunday evening, during the television programme "Epitsentr" (1+1 studio), the press secretary of the Minister of Defence, Serhiy Nahorianskyi, stated that the Ministry of Defence of Ukraine acknowledged that the cause of the tragedy in Brovary, which killed three people and left five with injuries of varying severity, was the hit on the nine-storey building by a training surface-to-surface missile.

=== 24 April ===
According to a statement by the Interfax-Ukraine agency, Volodymyr Tereshchenko, commander of the missile troops and artillery of the Armed Forces, answering the question why, for four days after the tragedy, the Ministry of Defence did not acknowledge that it was a "training-combat" missile that hit the building, explained that "there were many doubts."

According to him, at a distance of 80–90 km (the distance from the Honcharivske training ground to Brovary), the missile flies at an altitude of about 8,000 metres, and the speed at which it hits the target is 600–700 m/s. When the missile hits a building, its weight is 1.1 tonnes. An impact of such force turns the missile into large fragments, and it is difficult to prove immediately that it was a missile. "Only a few small pieces confirm and give the right and confidence to understand that this is our missile, launched from the training ground," he said.

Recalling the initial information from the Ministry of Defence press service that the missile hit a target located 30 km from the launch site, the military noted that at the site a control group of officers did indeed find a crater "characteristic of the impact site of such a missile." "We believed in the reliability of this missile system more than in ourselves," Tereshchenko said at the time.

Ukraine's minister of defence Oleksandr Kuzmuk made a statement in which he ruled out the involvement of the "human factor" in the failures of the systems of the surface-to-surface missile fired on 20 April from the Honcharivske training ground that hit a residential building in Brovary, indicating that among the causes that led to the tragedy were a failure (malfunction) of the power supply system, a failure (malfunction) of hydraulic drives and the failure of a pump or depressurisation of high-pressure pipelines, and a failure (malfunction) of the discrete-analog computing device.

On 24 April, another exercise was to be held at the Zhytomyr training ground with the presence of the military leadership and Supreme Commander-in-Chief Leonid Kuchma. At the last moment it became known that the president would not go to the exercise. The official version was that weather forecasters predicted bad weather, which would limit the ability of combat aviation to carry out tasks.

=== 25 April ===
Military experts clearly name as one of the possible causes of the surface-to-surface missile hitting a residential building in Brovary the explosion of the gas generator of the missile's power supply system, which failed during flight. According to the commission, an explosion occurred in the gas generator, which is located in the tail section and is a propellant charge (grain). As a result, the missile became "uncontrolled and continued its flight as a freely thrown body at an angle to the horizon."

=== 29 April ===
Ukraine's Minister of Defence Oleksandr Kuzmuk stated that he considered it unfair to resign after the accident:

From my side it would have been dishonest to make a noble public-relations gesture: you see what a strong person I am. By doing so I would have abandoned my troops, my staff; with so-called nobility I would have hidden behind this tragedy. I decided for myself to drink this bitter cup to the dregs.

— Minister of Defence of Ukraine Oleksandr Kuzmuk, 29 April 2000

On the same day, the military found the rear section of the 9K79 missile together with an aerodynamic control surface 2 km from the launch position of the 5th battery at the Honcharivske training ground. This once again confirmed the version of an onboard explosion and uncontrolled flight of the missile after 12 seconds from the moment of launch.

== Victims ==
- Volodymyr Siryk – resident of the 3rd floor, 61 years old.
- Zinaida Biriukova – resident of the 3rd floor, 63 years old.
- Raya Mykhailova – a young resident of the 8th floor.

== Aftermath ==
After the tragedy, Lieutenant General Volodymyr Tereshchenko, commander of the Rocket Forces and Artillery, and Colonel Heorhiy Kornieiev, an officer of the combat training group, were dismissed, and Lieutenant General Valeriy Pashynskyi, first deputy commander of the Northern Operational Command, was demoted.

In 2006, the 123rd Rocket Brigade, which had launched the missile, was disbanded and all equipment was removed from the unit.

== Subsequent fate of the victims and the building ==
91 residents of the damaged building were temporarily relocated to the Sport Hotel in Brovary.

For several months after the tragedy, local residents brought wreaths and fresh flowers to the destroyed entrance in memory of the victims of the disaster.

On 25 April, the victims of the explosion were paid 2,000 hryvnias in compensation, and the families of the dead were paid 5,000 hryvnias. The 96 evacuees from the 16 destroyed apartments were resettled to a new building on Hrushevskoho Street.

The destroyed entrance was completely restored by 2001, and the apartments in it were transferred to military officers. No trace of the missile remained; only the new walls were made 15 cm wider.

== See also ==
- Siberia Airlines Flight 1812

== Sources ==
- GNS: UKRAINE: MISSILES
- Deadly "Tochka": 10 years ago a missile hit a residential building in Brovary (in Ukrainian)
- Video of the disaster on YouTube (in Ukrainian)
