= Aleksandr Omelchenko =

Russian footballer

Personal information
- Full name: Aleksandr Konstantinovich Omelchenko
- Date of birth: February 11, 1983 (age 43)
- Height: 1.70 m (5 ft 7 in)
- Position: Midfielder

Youth career
- FC Rotor Volgograd

Senior career*
Years	Team	Apps	(Gls)
2000	FC Rotor-2 Volgograd	16	(0)
2001–2005	FC Rotor Volgograd	5	(0)
2001	→ FC Metallurg Krasnoyarsk (loan)	5	(0)
2005	FC Tekstilshchik Kamyshin	10	(0)
2006	FC Olimpia Volgograd	26	(2)
2007–2008	FC Chernomorets Novorossiysk	58	(2)
2009	FC Stavropol	31	(6)
2010	FC Chernomorets Novorossiysk	29	(5)
2011	FC Avangard Kursk	26	(1)
2012	FC Ufa	2	(0)
- * Club domestic league appearances and goals

Aleksandr Konstantinovich Omelchenko (Russian: Александр Константинович Омельченко; born February 11, 1983) is a former Russian professional footballer.

== Club career ==
He made his debut in the Russian Premier League in 2002 for FC Rotor Volgograd.
