= Nadra Bank =

- Company type: Public Joint-Stock Company
- Industry: banking, investment
- Founded: October 26, 1993
- Defunct: 4 June 2015
- Fate: liquidated by the National Bank of Ukraine after losing solvency
- Headquarters: Kyiv, Ukraine
- Services: Financial services
- Owner: Group DF (90%); Grenar Enterprises Ltd. (10%)
- Website: nadrabank.ua

Nadra Bank (Ukrainian: Надра Банк) was one of the largest commercial banks in Ukraine. It was founded in October 1993, and had its headquarters in Kyiv. The Bank ranked among the largest banks in its category according to the classification of the National Bank of Ukraine and operated a network of 543 outlets throughout Ukraine.

Nadra Bank was one of the three of top-20 Ukrainian banks which went into receivership during the 2008 financial crisis. Temporary administration at Nadra Bank (introduced in February 2009), was withdrawn in August 2011 with a new strategic investor, Dmytro Firtash, acquiring an 89.97% stake and injecting ₴ 3.5bn ($440m) of capital. The government did not participate in recapitalizing Nadra.

The bank was declared insolvent in February 2015. On 4 June 2015 the National Bank of Ukraine revoked its banking license and liquidated the bank.

== See also ==
- List of banks in Ukraine
