= Lviv Metro =

1980s planned metro system of Lviv

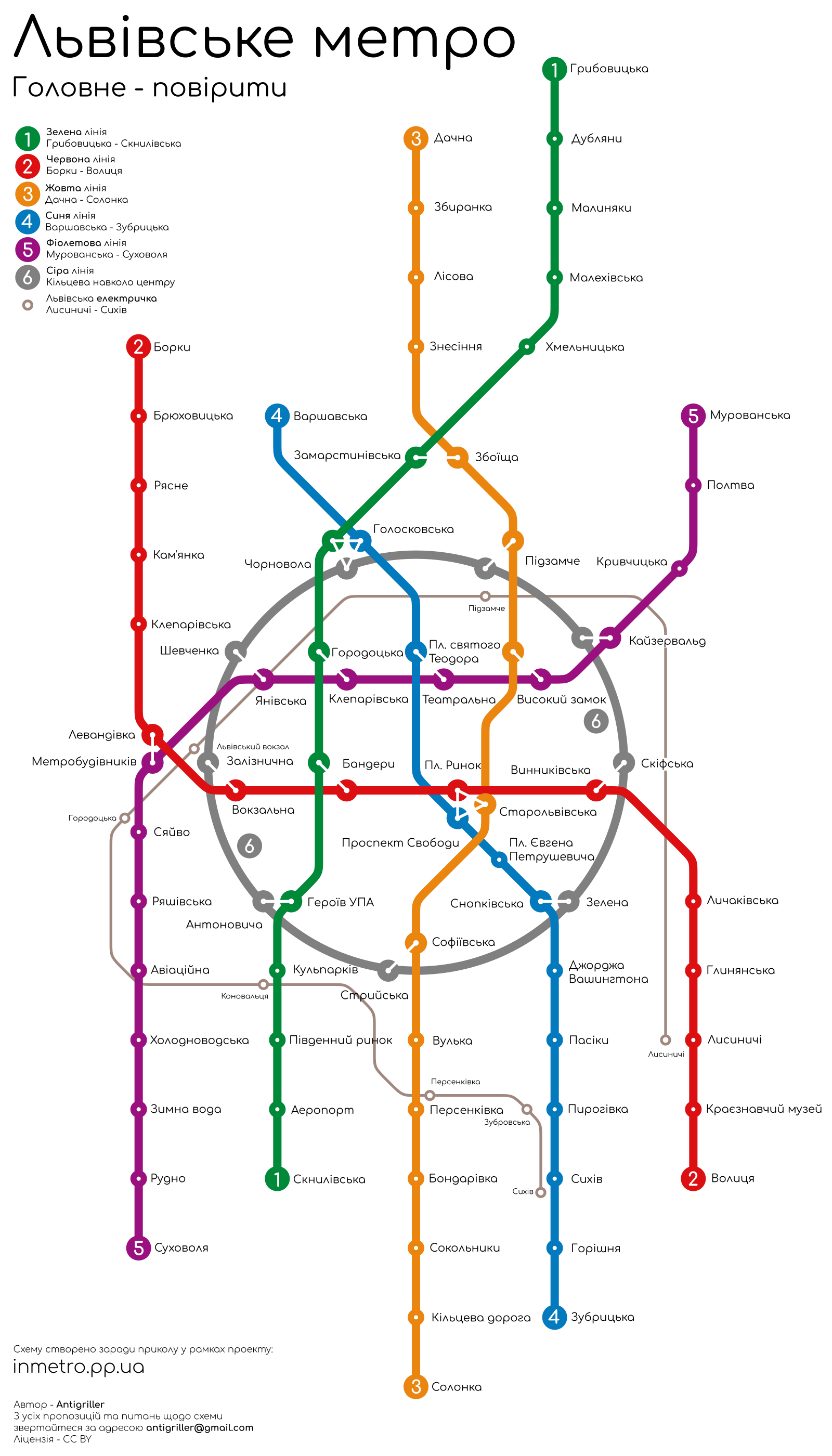
An enthusiast-made map of the proposed transit system.

The Lviv Metro (Ukrainian: Львівський метрополітен, romanized: L'vivs'kyj metropoliten, IPA: [ˈlʲwiu̯sʲkɪj ˌmɛtropol⁽ʲ⁾iˈtɛn]) is a rapid transit system that was planned in the city of Lviv in western Ukraine during the 1980s. During the early 2000s, the project was changed to utilize light-rail transport instead.

== History ==
In the 1960s, plans for the construction of a high-speed, partially underground tram were included in Lviv's promising master plan. Its design began in the late 1970s. First of all, it was planned to build two tunnels with the dimensions of the subway under the city center, and to bring them to the land routes. The second stage envisaged the construction of a third tunnel from Ivan Franko Square through the Citadel, Bandera Street and the railway station to Yaniv Cemetery. In 1987, the first land section was built from Sakharova Street to Naukova Street. Underground construction began with the construction of the first ventilation shaft in the courtyard of the Potocki Palace, which damaged the surrounding buildings.Therefore, given this, as well as the financial crisis of the late 1980s, the project was frozen.

== In culture ==
Lviv Metro became a subject of a popular Ukrainian internet meme, which emerged in 2008 as a humorous answer to Russian chauvinism and Ukrainophobia. According to the story spread by its followers, the metro system of Lviv exists in reality, having been completed by Banderites during the German occupation of the city with the use of Russian slave labour, and is currently being used in order to torture ethnic Russians and supporters of the Moscow Patriarchate. It is claimed that Lviv Metro consists of two lines (a black and a red one) shaped in the form of a trident, and operates 13 stations. The fictional metro system has an own website selling its merchandise.

== See also ==
- Trams in Lviv
- Lviv railway station
