= Trams in Lviv =

Electric tram network in Lviv, Ukraine

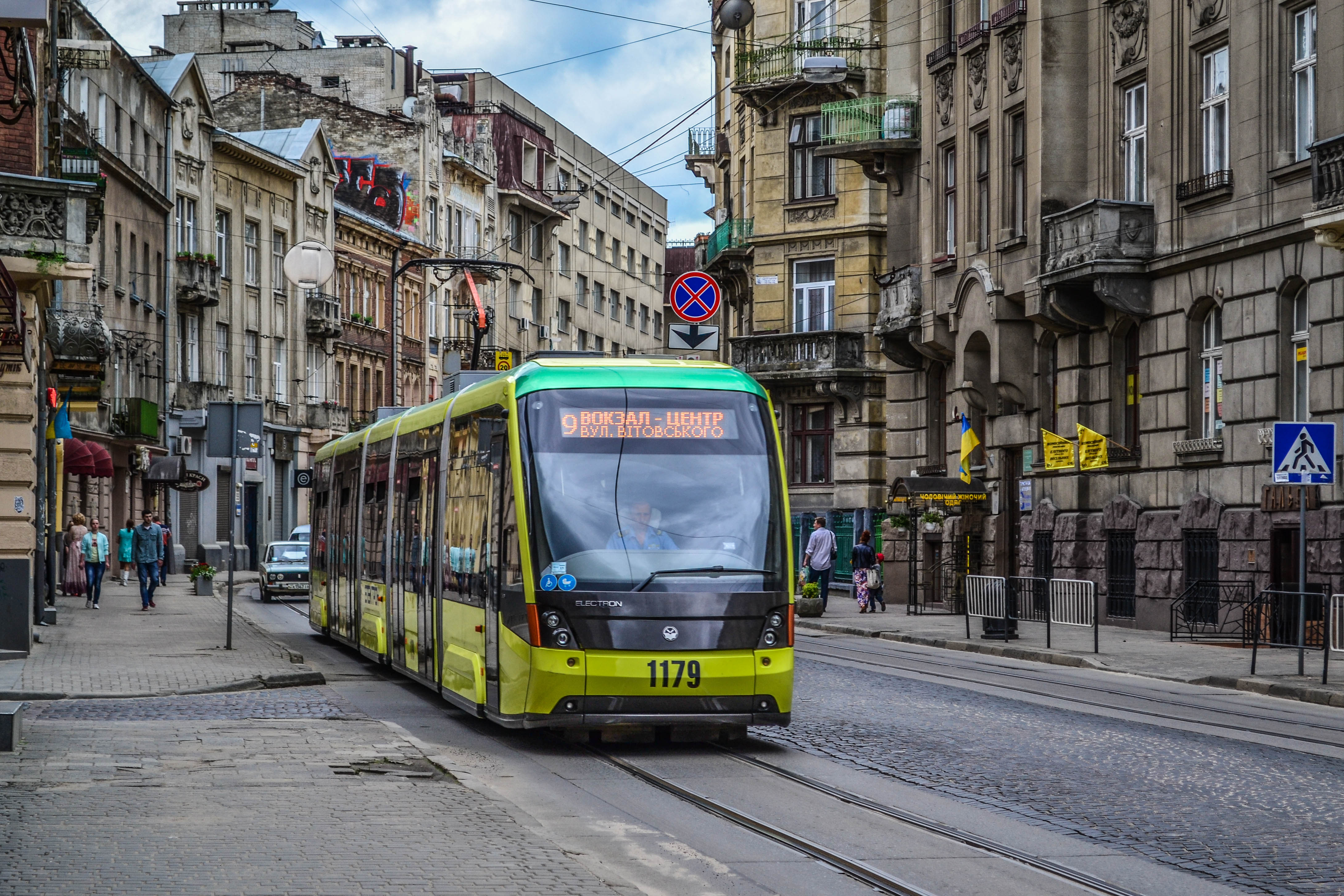

Overview
- Owner: Lviv City Council
- Locale: Lviv, Ukraine
- Transit type: Tram
- Number of lines: 8 (2024)
- Daily ridership: 51 000 (January 2024)
- Annual ridership: 17 million (approx.)
- Website: let.org.ua

Operation
- Began operation: 1880 – horse-drawn tram; 1894 – electric tram
- Operator: Lvivelectrotrans
- Number of vehicles: 137 passenger; 13 service

Technical
- System length: 99.1 km (61.6 mi)
- Track gauge: 1,000 mm (3 ft 3 3/8 in) metre gauge
- Electrification: 600V

The Lviv tramway network (Ukrainian: Львівський трамвай, romanized: Lvivskyi tramvai) is an electric tram system in Lviv, Ukraine. It is one of two tram systems in Western Ukraine (the other one is in Vinnytsia), and the largest narrow-gauge tram system in Ukraine.

From 1880 to 1908, the trams used a horse-drawn system, converting to an electric system after 1894. It was the first in the territory of modern Ukraine to have a system of horse-drawn trams, or any type of tram, as well as the second one after the Kyiv trams to use electricity.

The tram system reached its peak on the eve of World War II, when it was the city's main transport system; from the middle of the 20th century it gradually lost its position. In 2010, the trams accounted for 24.4% of passenger traffic in the city. As of January 1, 2022, there were 8 routes in the system, operated by the utility "LKP Lvivelectrotrans". In 2021, 24,678,300 paying passengers (including 2,785,623 students) used the tram and trolleybus services. In 2021, trams made 3.79 million vehicle-km of journeys. The length of the tracks and contact network is 81.85 km (2022), and the route network is 99.1 km (2022).

In January 2024, 1 243 959 passengers were transported by eight tram routes.

It is planned that in the future the tram will become a primary mode of transport in Lviv.

== History ==
=== Horse-tram ===
The first time the possibility of a horse-drawn tram in Lviv was discussed was in the late 1860s. In 1870, a project for the construction of a horse-drawn tram in Lviv was developed by two British firms but was rejected by the Lviv City Council. However, in 1878, when it became clear that without public transport the city could not thrive, the city council announced a competition for the construction of tramways. Applications were filed by Belgian and Trieste tram companies. The commission created by the magistrate preferred the Trieste Tramway Company ("Societa Triestina Tramway" ), and a contract was signed on February 1, 1879. After this initial step and after 25 years of operation, the tram network became the property of the city. On May 21, a construction plan was approved.

On November 25, 1879, a trial trip took place. Here is a description from November 27 of that year found in "Lvivska Gazeta" :

"	The horse-drawn tram at noon began a trial trip from its depot on the street Gorodets-Yanivska to the Customs Square and in the opposite direction. For this purpose three wagons left the depot: one is open during the summer, the second one with one salon, and the third one – a passenger, divided into two classes. The tests were fairly smooth, but a little late due to the fact that the workers did not finish cleaning the track from ice and snow in time ...	»

The first tram in Ukraine was opened in Lviv on May 3, 1880. After May 5, payment for travel was introduced. The newspaper "Dilo" wrote on this subject:

"	The Lviv tram started on May 5 the along the correct route shown on tickets from the Mitna Square to Ferdinand's barracks. Every 9 minutes the carriage leaves the barracks. Five cars will ride 19 times a day, so 95 passengers can be seated at the stations where the car is stopped. Initially, all tram cars were packed every day in a row. In the end, most sat down out of curiosity	»

There were two lines functioning (the main railway station – Gorodotska Street, the Customs Square and the main railway station – Podzamcze ), which transported an average of 1,867,000 passengers per year. In 1889, there were 105 horses and 37 passenger and 3 freight cars made in the Austrian city of Graz. They were dark brown with white inscriptions reading "Lviv Tram" (Polish: "Tramway Lwowski"), decorated with a red border. In the summer, each wagon was pulled by a couple of horses, but on the streets of Gorodotska and Shevchenko, the wagons were pulled by three horses when ascending, and one when descending (accordingly, the fare was also different). When snow fell, the number of horses was increased to four. The average speed was 6.4 km / h. The paths were oak, with a width of 1000 mm. The staff numbered 70 people.

In 1905, negotiations began on the issue of a municipal-operated horse-drawn tram, the possibility of which was foreseen after 25 years of exploitation. The contract for the purchase of the city network was signed on July 8, 1906, but the transfer of property extended for 11 months.

=== Steam Tram ===
In 1888 the Society of Lviv-Bełżec Railways submitted a project for the construction of a steam tram to the Lviv magistracy. The Bełżec railroad had a station in Lviv on the site of the modern station of Klepariv – then it was the outskirts of the city – which was not connected by public transport to the center, which became an obstacle for rail passengers; therefore the construction of the steam tram was designed primarily for them. According to the project, construction of two lines was foreseen: the first one was to go from the station of Klepariv to the station of Pidzamche by the streets of Shevchenko, Rappoport, Dzherelna, Pid Dubom and Turetska. The second one was to go from the station of Klepariv to the streets of Shevchenko and Zaliznychna, past Chernivtsi station, the streets of Bandera, Nechuia-Levitskoho, Vitovsky, Franko and Lychakivsky to the Lychakiv station. The idea of a steam tram had become widely publicized in Lviv, but the project of the Lviv-Bełżec Railroad Association did not find support from city officials.

The second time the construction of a steam tram in Lviv was raised in 1892–93. Then the Mortgage Joint-Stock Bank of Lviv offered the city council a concession for laying the line from the Church of St. Anne's Shevchenko Street to Yaniv, but this project was not implemented.

=== Origin of the Electric Tram ===
In 1893, the Lviv Magistrate announced a tender for the construction of electric tram lines and 400 hp (300 kW) power plants, since the horse-drawn tram was no longer able to cope with the area's growing transportation needs. It was won by the German firm Siemens & Halske, which obliged after two years of demands from the city council. On March 23, 1893, the project budget was approved amounting to 880,000 crowns. Construction of the electric tram line began in September 1893. By May 15, 1894, the Lviv newspaper "Dilo" wrote:

"	A trial ride of an electric tram in Lviv took place at night between 1 and 2 am and two cars, which also had electric lighting. The ride was very effective, because from under the wheels and on the sheaves of wires appeared electrical light ... On that late night a large number of interesting things occurred ...	»

On May 31, 1894, the regular route of the electric tram was opened in Lviv, being the second in Ukraine and the fourth in Austria-Hungary. The length of the lines were 8.3 km. The following routes were performed (current street names are given): " Freedom Avenue – Stepan Bandera street – (main station)", "Freedom Avenue – Ivan Franko Street – Stryisky Park" and "Freedom Avenue – Lychakivska Street – Lychakiv". The opening was timed to the 1894 General National Exhibition in Lviv, held in Stryi Park.

There was a mixed reception to the emergence of an electric tram in Lviv. The wives of Lviv's horse-driven tram workers, who lived on Lychak, bombarded the first electric tram with tomatoes and rotten eggs. According to Ilkam Lemkom, "some Miss Skorobetska, the wife of the driver who lost his job, wrote in a respectable Lviv newspaper that she had, "made a proposal to the tram physically impossible to execute, with appropriate gestures." In simpler language, this meant that the woman, having thrown her skirt and leaning back to the tramway, urged him to kiss her in one place."

In 1896, the city bought a network of electric trams and a power plant for 1,680,000 crowns.

=== Prior to the First World War ===
In 1907, the Ministry of Railways of the Austrian Empire allowed conversion of the horse-drawn trams to use electric traction. Thus, the following routes were opened, beginning with Freedom Avenue: Bogdan Khmelnytsky to Pidzamche, Zelena to Lychakivskyi cemetery, Shevchenko to Klepariv, Gorodotsky to the train station, and Zamarstynivska to Zamarstyniv. Horse-drawn operations ended December 29, 1908. The horses were sold, and the cars reworked to function as trailers of the electric trams.

In 1907 a line was created for the "New World" (an area in Lviv), after which property prices in the then-most prestigious district of the city fell by half. In 1908, trams extended to the Zhovkva tollhouse, in 1910, to the High Castle and to Snopkiv, and in 1914, to the station "Lychakiv". In the spring of 1914, the length of tram lines reached 24.4 km. The directions were marked with two Latin letters – the first letters of the names of the final stops in Polish. The stops had the following notation:

- D – Main Station (Polish: Dworzec glówny)
- H – Freedom Avenue (stop called "Hetman Street" – name of the avenue at the time, Polish: Hetmańska)
- J – Klepariv (the stop was called "Yanivska Street" – then name of Shevchenko street, Polish: Janowska)
- K – Sofiyivka (the stop was called "Kilinsky Park" – then name of Stryisky Park, Polish: Kilińskiego Park)
- L – Novyi Svit (the stop was called "29 November Street" – then name of Konovalets street; Polish: 29 Listopada for the day the November Uprising started)
- Ł – Lychakiv (Polish: Łyczaków)
- P or G – Pidzamche (Havrylivka, Polish: Podzamcze or Gabryelówka)
- Ż – Zhovkva tollhouse (Polish: Rogatka Żółkiewska)
- U – High Castle (the stop was called "Street of the Union of Lublin" – then name of Hutsulska street, Polish: Unii Lubelskiej)
- Z – Zamarstyniv (Polish: Zamarstynów)

=== First World War and Interwar Period ===
View of the Lviv trams in the depot (1920s).

In September 1914, Russian troops entered Lviv. During their stay in the city (until June 22, 1915 ) the tram continued its work. At this time, a special guide was published in Russian on "Using the tram". During the battle for the city in the Ukrainian-Polish war in November 1918, the grid suffered significant damage, resulting in service stopping in May 1919.

From October 1, 1922, traffic in Lviv, as in all of Poland, was converted to right-hand drive. Work was thus carried out on the re-positioning of turning arrows. From the autumn of 1923, in connection with the general standardization throughout the republic, the routes of the trams were denoted by numbers.

In 1925, a line was laid to Bogdanivka and, the Kulish Street were laid for unloading the Bogdan Khmelnitsky Street. In 1929 the "Railway Station – Kyiv Street – Franko Street" line was opened. By 1933, the total length of the tram network along the street axis was 32.8 km. In the tram administration were 119 motor vehicles, 58 trailer cars, and 5 snow-removal cars. The tramway consisted of two depots, car repair workshops and two traction substations with a total capacity of 6540 kW.

=== Second World War ===
On September 1, 1939, in air raid at the beginning of the German invasion of Poland, rails and a contact network on Gorodotsky Street were damaged as a result of bombardment. The movement of trams on this site was stopped. After mid-September service stopped throughout the city. The regular operation of trams was restored on September 25, 1939, after the occupation of Lviv by the Red Army. During the Soviet occupation, new plans were put into operation – extension of existing lines: connecting the streets on Gorodotska to the railway on Bogdanivka, the streets on Shevchenka to the railway, Zamarstynivska Street to Gorodnytsky Street, as well as the Lychakivska Street to the Pasichna Street.

During the German occupation, the Lviv tram continued to operate. However, on some routes, wagons with the words "Only for the Germans" could be seen and other cars were created with separate seats for the Germans, separated by a chain. Between 1940 and 1941 there were car-repair workshops, which during the period of occupation, rebuilt three cars on motor and 9 cars – on a trailer. It is known that during the occupation of the tram was used for military purposes, in particular, trailer carriages were made for the purpose of carrying prisoners.

=== Soviet Period ===
During the battles for the city in June 1944, the tram factory was badly damaged. Its recovery was gradual: the first journey after the battles took place on March 1, 1945.

In accordance to the Treaty between the USSR and soviet controlled communist Poland, the Poles were expelled from present day Western Ukraine, which was annexed from the Second Republic of Poland to the Ukrainian SSR. As a side effect, approximately 400 employees (80% of staff) of the Tram Administration left their job. Due to lack of professionals, the normal operation of the tram was interrupted. Employees began to recruit from the staff of the Lviv railway, as well as those in Eastern Ukraine.

By the summer of 1949, all routes had been restored. However, later there was the problem of old cars which had already been in operation for 50 years – these were modernized in the car repair workshops. New tramways consisted of two tied cars. The wooden parts in them had been replaced by metal, doors were arranged with pneumatic drives, and open outside areas were closed off. The upper part of the car was painted in blue, the bottom in yellow. As of January 1, 1950, the Lviv tramway consisted of two depots with a total capacity of 80 carriages, 185 passenger cars (of which 59 were trailer vehicles), 19 cargo platforms and snow blowers.

In 1959, the journey between Freedom Avenue and Mickiewicz Square was stopped in order to allow room for the trolleybuses. Instead, a roundabout was set up near the Puppet Theater. In connection with the laying of trolleybus routes, the operation of trams was stopped along the following lines: on Bohdanivka(1953), on Kulish Street (1959), and on the streets of Zelena, Dniprovska and Levytskiy (1963). In 1952 to 1953 a line from Zhovkva tollhouse was continued to the tram depot number 2 (near the meat processing plant).

In the 1950s, the renovation of the tram park was started. Due to the impossibility of using new one-way wagons (not designed for "shuttle traffic") in areas without turning rings, the Lviv tram line was forced to close the lines to the High Castle (route No. 12) and to the upper parts of the Ivan Franko Street (route No. 10). Since then, the minimum number of routes has been six.

During the 1970s, the city received a large number of new Tatra T-4SU and Tatra KT-4SU cars, which resulted in the introduction of many units from the 1970s (when traveling on two trained cars).

In 1978 a Lviv tramway trolleybus repair plant was delivered, designed for 400 major repairs per year. It began to serve urban transport companies not only in Lviv but also in other cities of Ukraine and Russia.

=== High Speed Tram ===
In the 1960s plans for the construction of a high-speed, partly underground tram were included in the prospective general plan of Lviv. Its design began in the late 1970s. At first, plans were made to build two tunnels with around metro size in the center of the city (practically, metrotrams), and to link them to overground routes. The portals of the first tunnel, 2.2 km in length, were to be built in the Pidzamche district and intersection of Franko Street and Snopkivska. This radius included the construction of two underground stations: "Old Town" (near the Old Market Square) and "Reunification Square" (now Halytska). Ports of the second tunnel of 3.2 km in length should have been located at the beginning of Sakharov Street and at the intersection of Lychakivs'ka and Mechnikov streets. Three underground stations were planned: "University", "Reunification Square" and "Vynnik Market". The second step was to build a third tunnel from Ivan Franko Square through the Citadel, Bandera Street and the railway station to Yanivsky Cemetery with the underground stations Polytechnic Institute, Kropyvnitsky Square and Station.

In 1987 the first portion of the overground high-speed line was built between street Sakharov to the streets of Science. Underground construction began with the erection of the first Potocki Palace in the courtyard, which led to damage to surrounding buildings. In light of this, as well as the financial crisis of the late 1980s, the project was frozen.

== Modern trams ==
line 8

As of April 2023, the Lviv tramway consists of 8 lines on 81 kilometers of tracks with approximately 70 cars. Previously in bad shape, many tracks were reconstructed since 2006, and more are to be reconstructed in subsequent years. Most of the trams are the KT4 type, produced by Czech ČKD Tatra Works. Older T4+T4 trams no longer operate. Pre-war Gothaer Waggonfabrik cars, which were built after 1910, are only used for maintenance and utility purposes. In the 2000s and 2010s, Lviv acquired 50 overhauled and modernized Tatra KT4 trams previously used in German cities Erfurt, Gera and Berlin, with them being the first new tramcar purchases since the independence of Ukraine.

In 1991, nearly 140 million passengers used the system. By 2002, this had decreased to 60 million. Despite a large number of passengers, approximately 65% of them ride free of charge. Thus, the considerable debt of the company must be covered by the government of the Lviv Oblast.

The price of a single trip was 50 kopecks (about €0.08) in 2007. It was raised to 75 kopecks (about €0.12) in 2008 and to 1 hrn in 2009. The price as of 2012 is 1 hrn and 50 kopecks, with the cost having risen from 1 hrn and 25 kopecks just prior to the Euro 2012 football championships as Lviv was one of the host cities. In April 2015, the price of a single trip was 2 hrn (about €0.08). It was then raised to 3 hrn in September 2017 and then to 5 hrn (about €0.2) in April 2018.

In September 2012, a contract to supply modern low-floor trams was awarded to Lvivelektrotrans, a joint venture of Electron and TransTec Vetschau. These newest additions to Lviv's long tram history were introduced in August 2013 and run on route 9a. There are five sections in the 100% low floor tram Electron T5L64, designed by Lviv's constructors in the Lviv-based company Electron. In total, Lviv has 16 Electrons, eight T5L64 and eight T3L44. Currently Lvivelectrotrans implementing several development projects with loans from EBRD and EIB. In particular, the purchase of new modern low-floor trams (10 units of Electron T5L64) in 2020 (with delivery until mid-2023).

== Rolling stock ==
=== Current ===
Picture	Manufacturer	Model	Quantity	Since
	(Czech Republic) ČKD Tatra	KT4SU; KT4D; KT4DM	56; 23; 42	1976; 2007; 2018
	(Ukraine) Electron	T5L64; T3L44	11; 8	2013; 2014
	(Germany) Duewag	Be 4/8	10	2025
	(Switzerland) Schindler	Be 4/8	6	2025

=== Historical ===
Image	Manufacturer	Models	Quantity	Years
	(Germany) Siemens & Halske		26	1894–1920
	(Poland) Sanok	SW1	83	1903–1980
	(Poland) Sanok	SN1	50	1912–1944
	(Poland) LRL	Typ 185	5	1926–1950
	(Germany) Gotha	ET54	11	1955–1972
	(Germany) Gotha	T57/59E; T2; G4	26; 7; 50	1957–1981; 1962–1985; 1966–1988
	(Czech Republic) ČKD Tatra	T4SU	83	1972–2011

== Images ==
Trams in Lviv

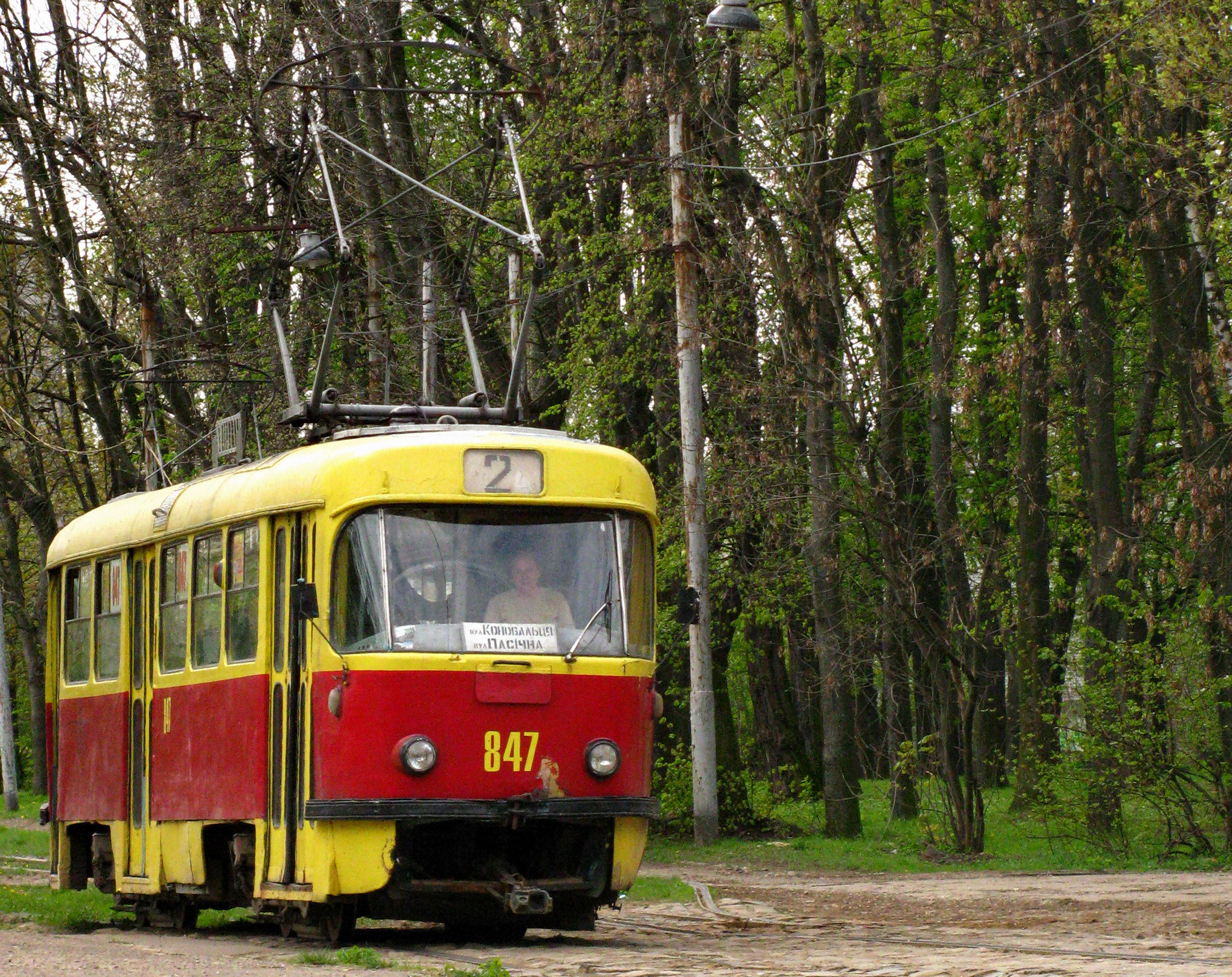
Tram type T4SU (non in use) at line 2 in 2010

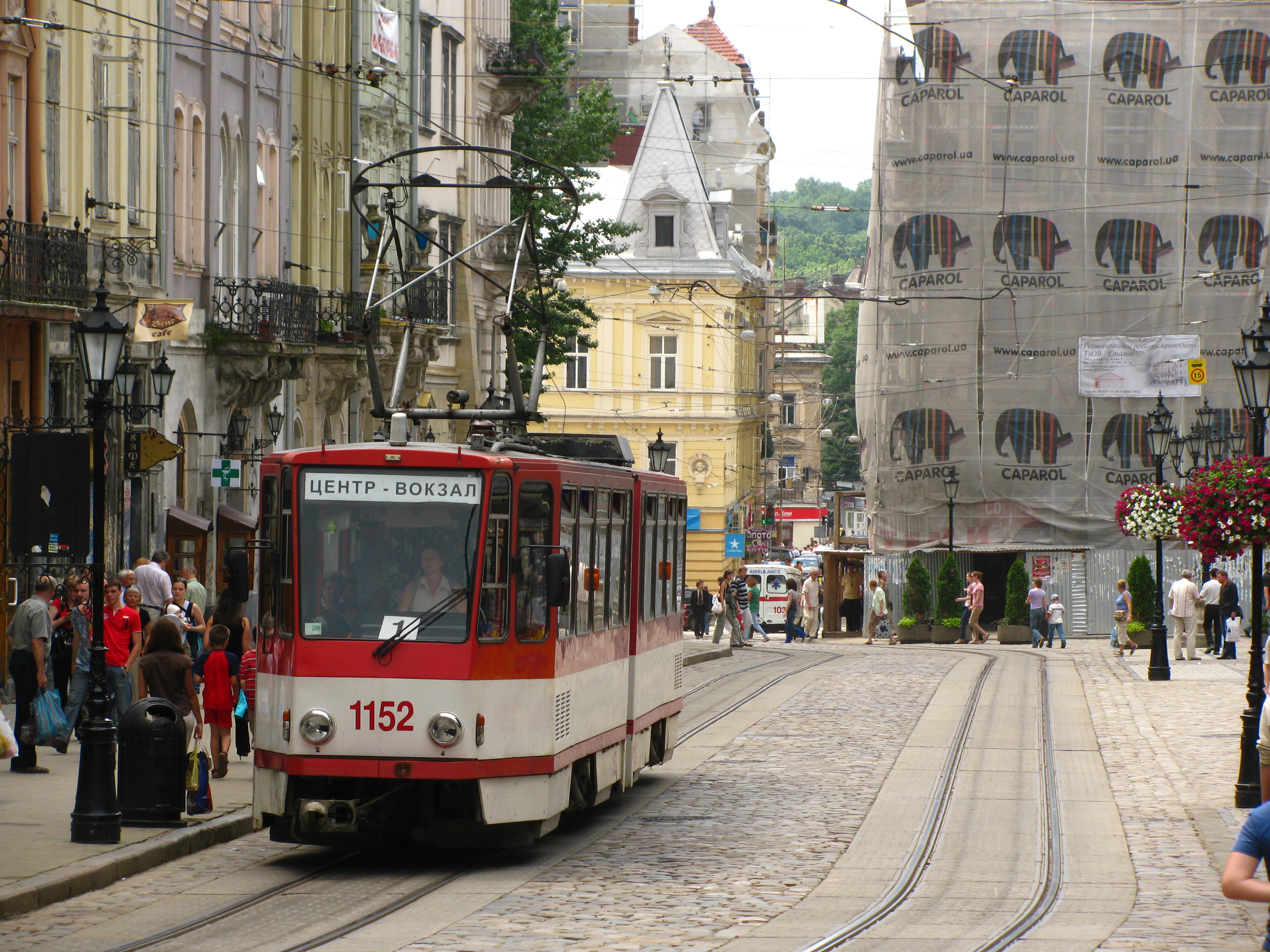
Tram KT4D in Lviv, Market Square

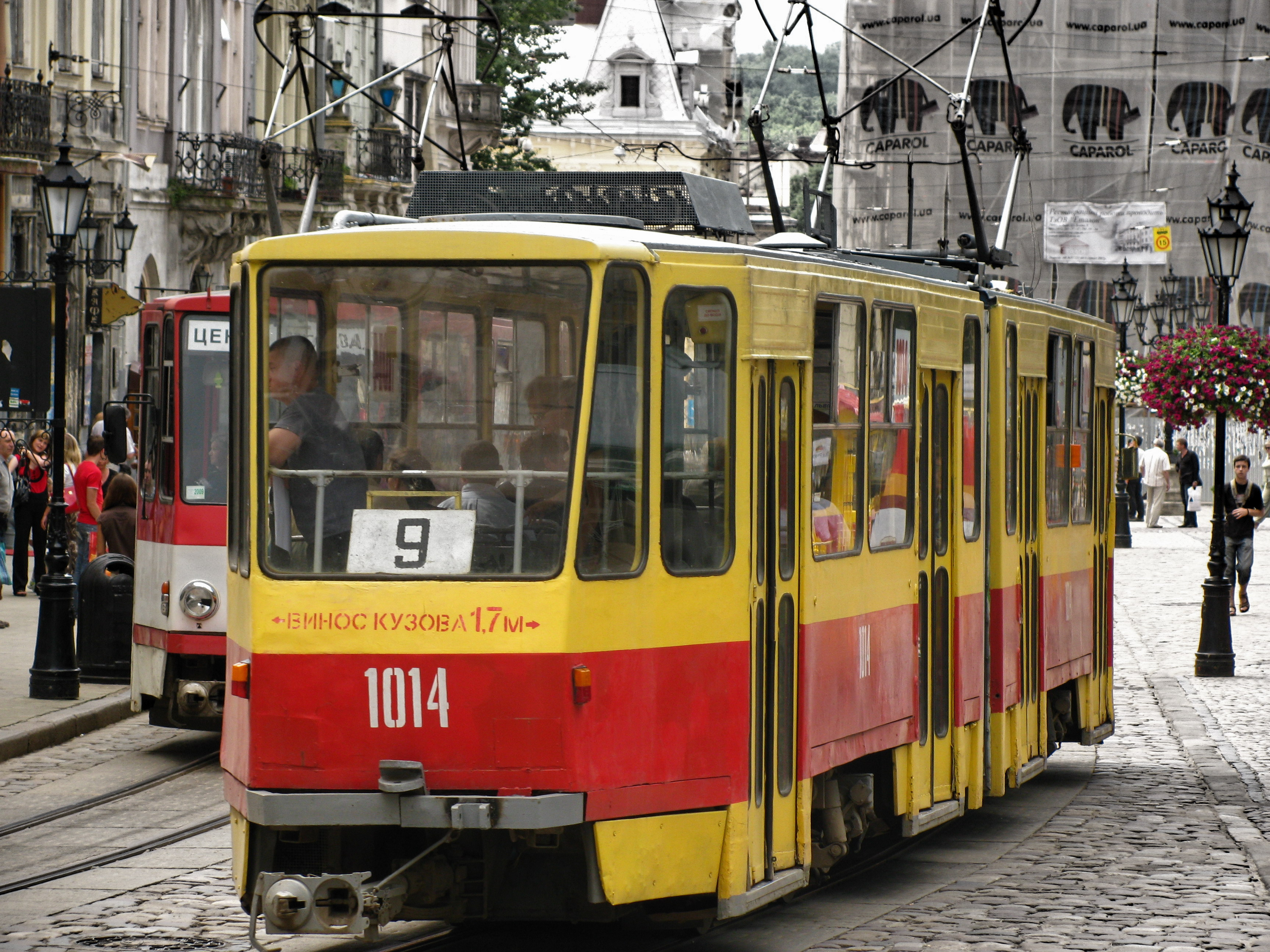
Tram KT4SU (non in use), line 9

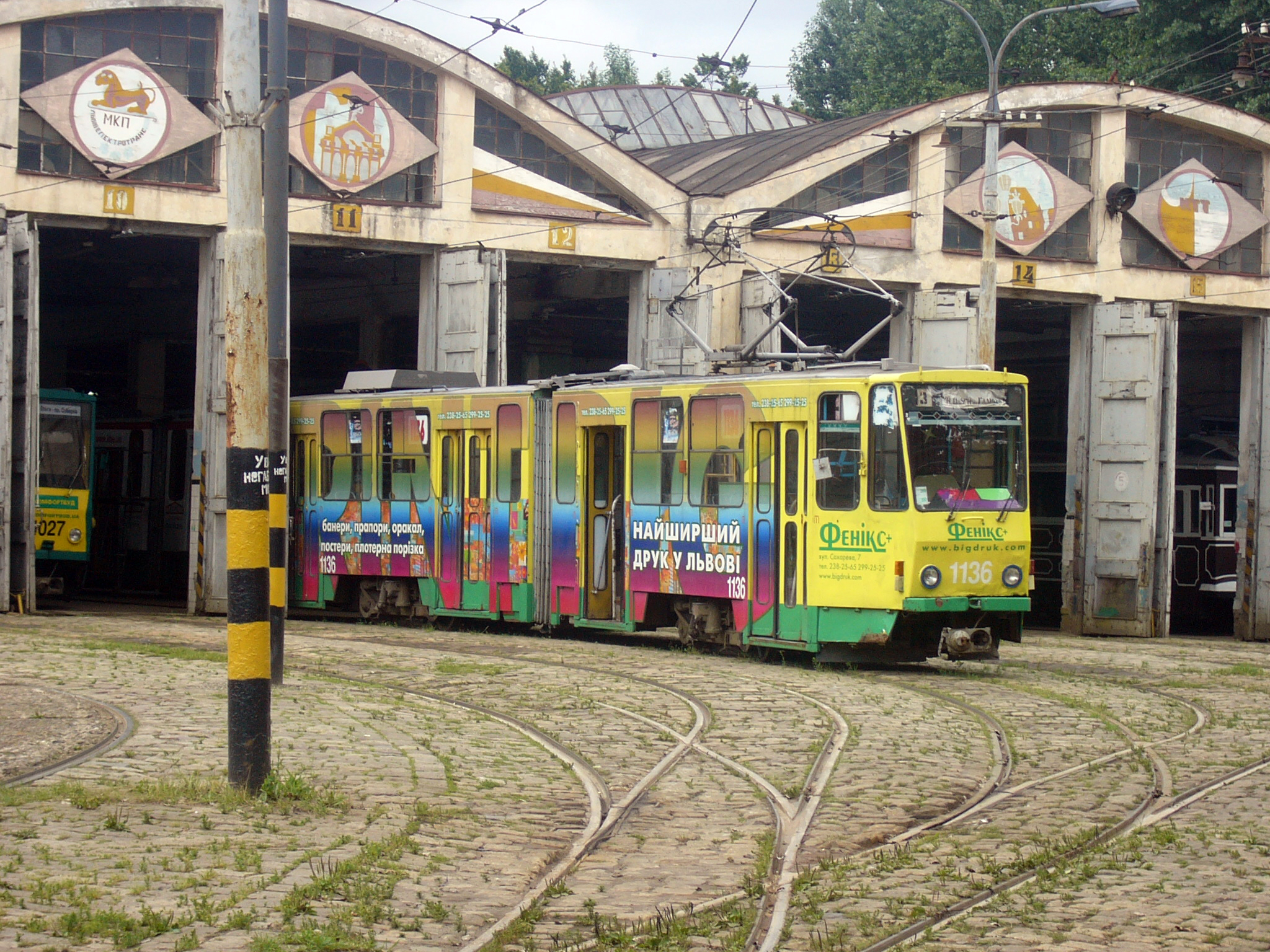
Lviv's old tram depot

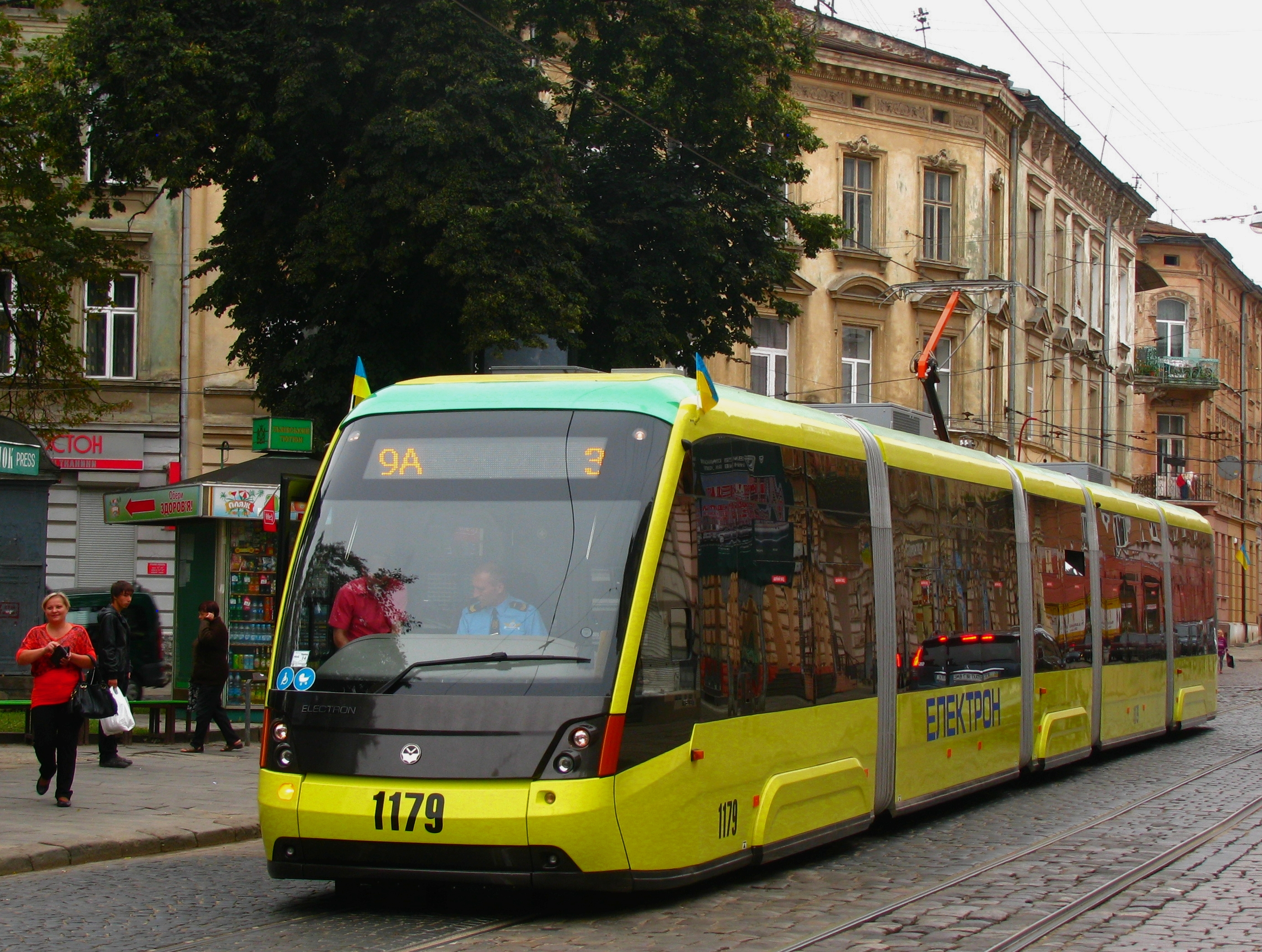
Modern low-floor tram Electron T5L64 on route 9a

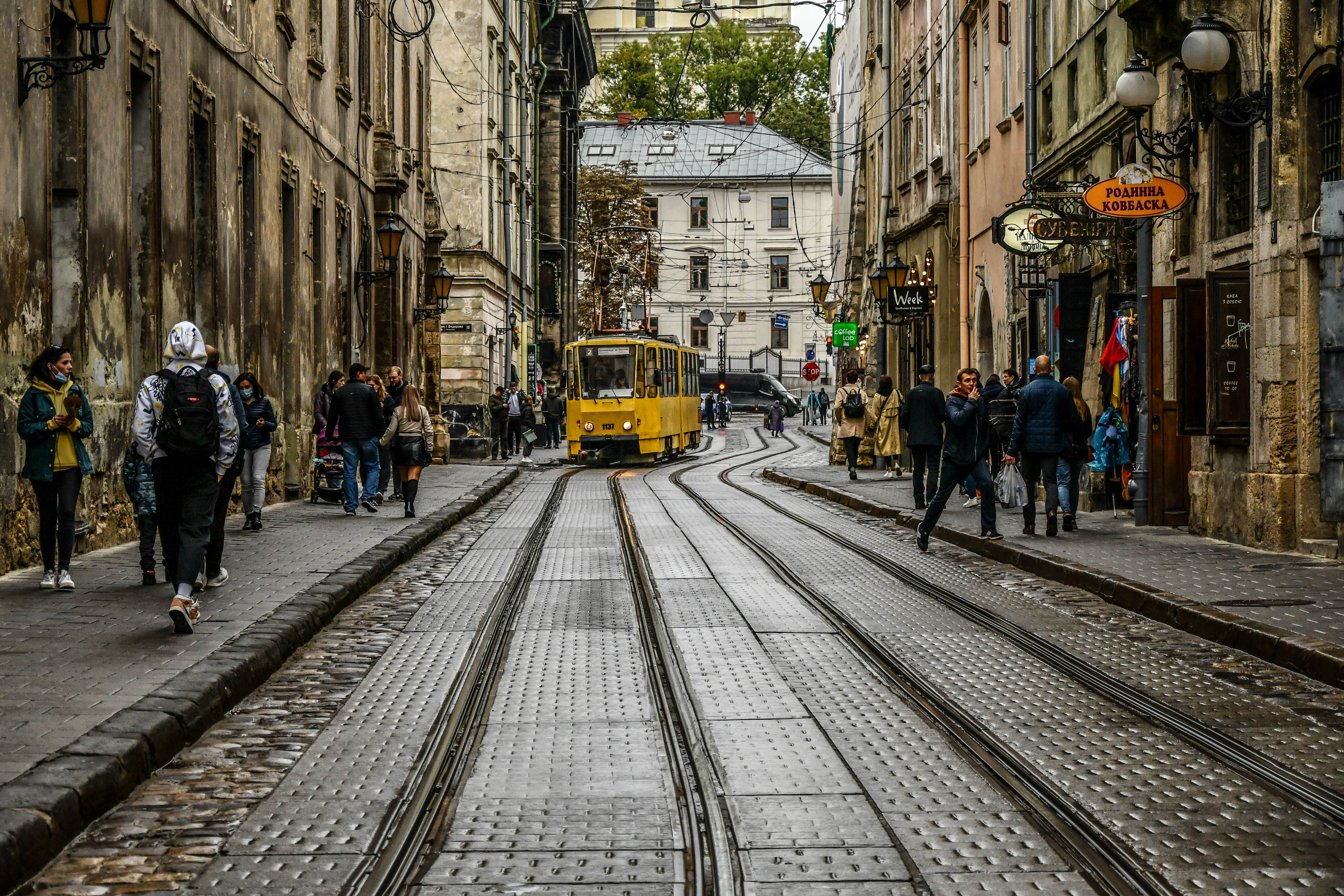

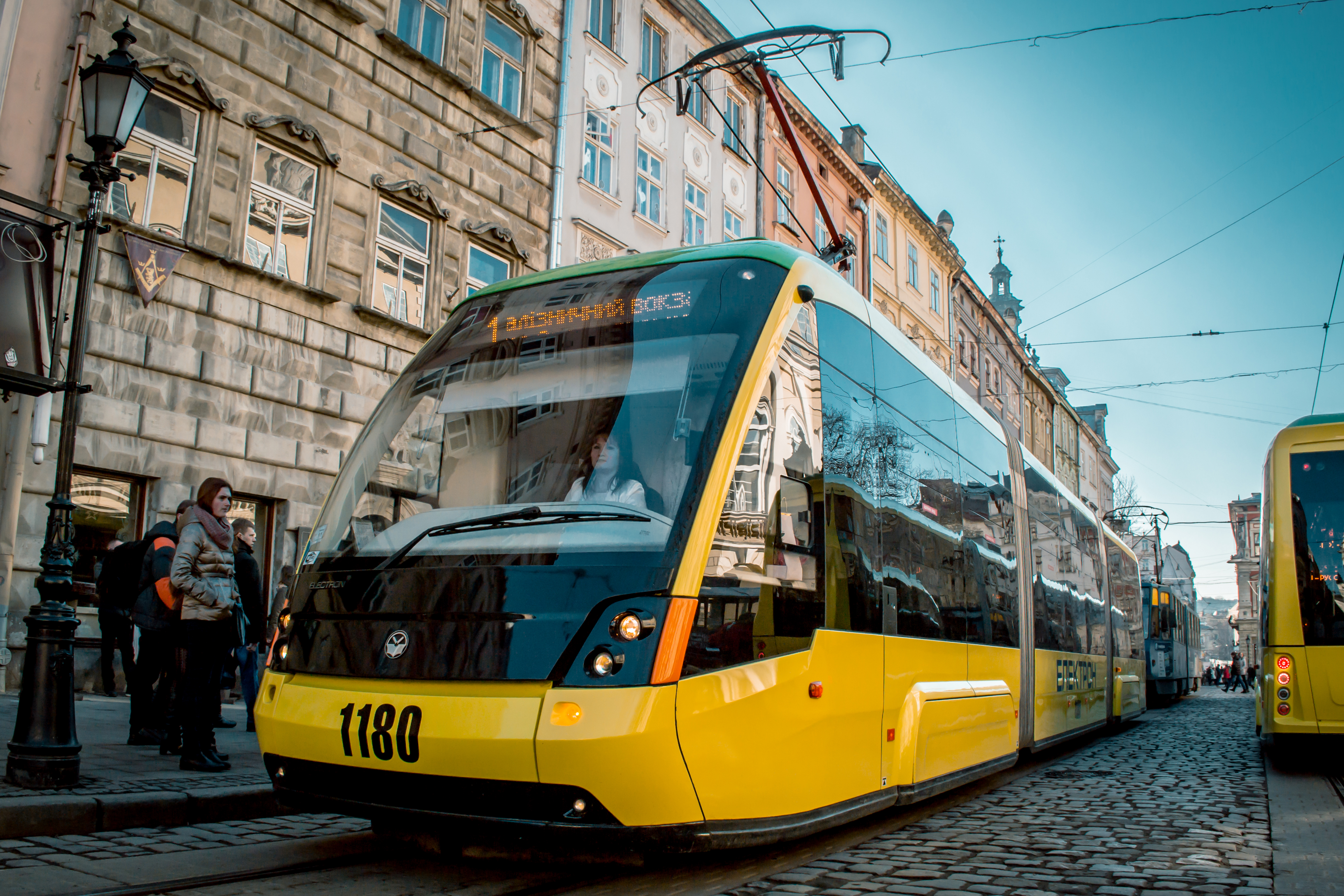
Electron T3L44 tram at Rynok square in Lviv

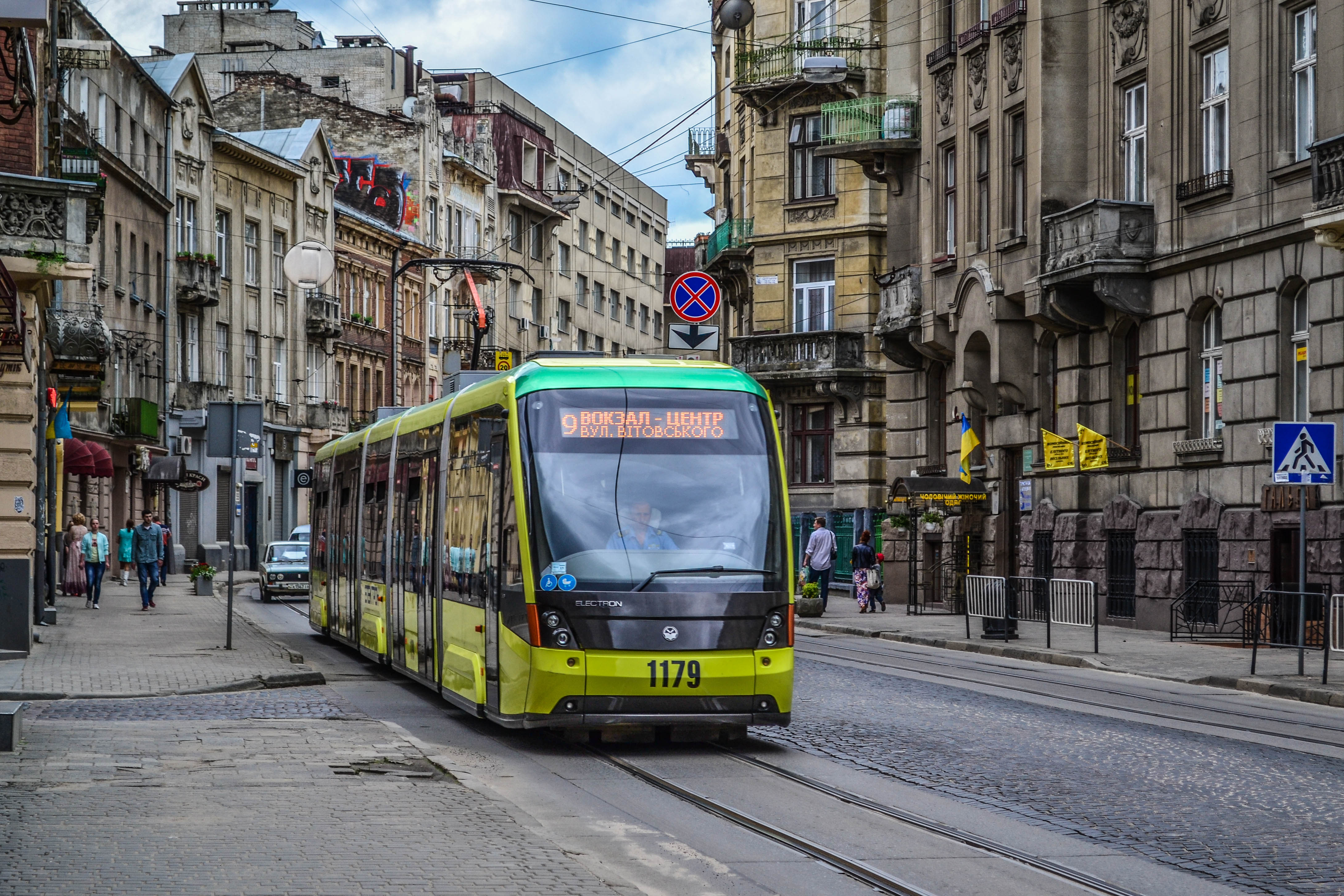
First Electron T5L64 (1179) tram in Ivana Franka street in Lviv

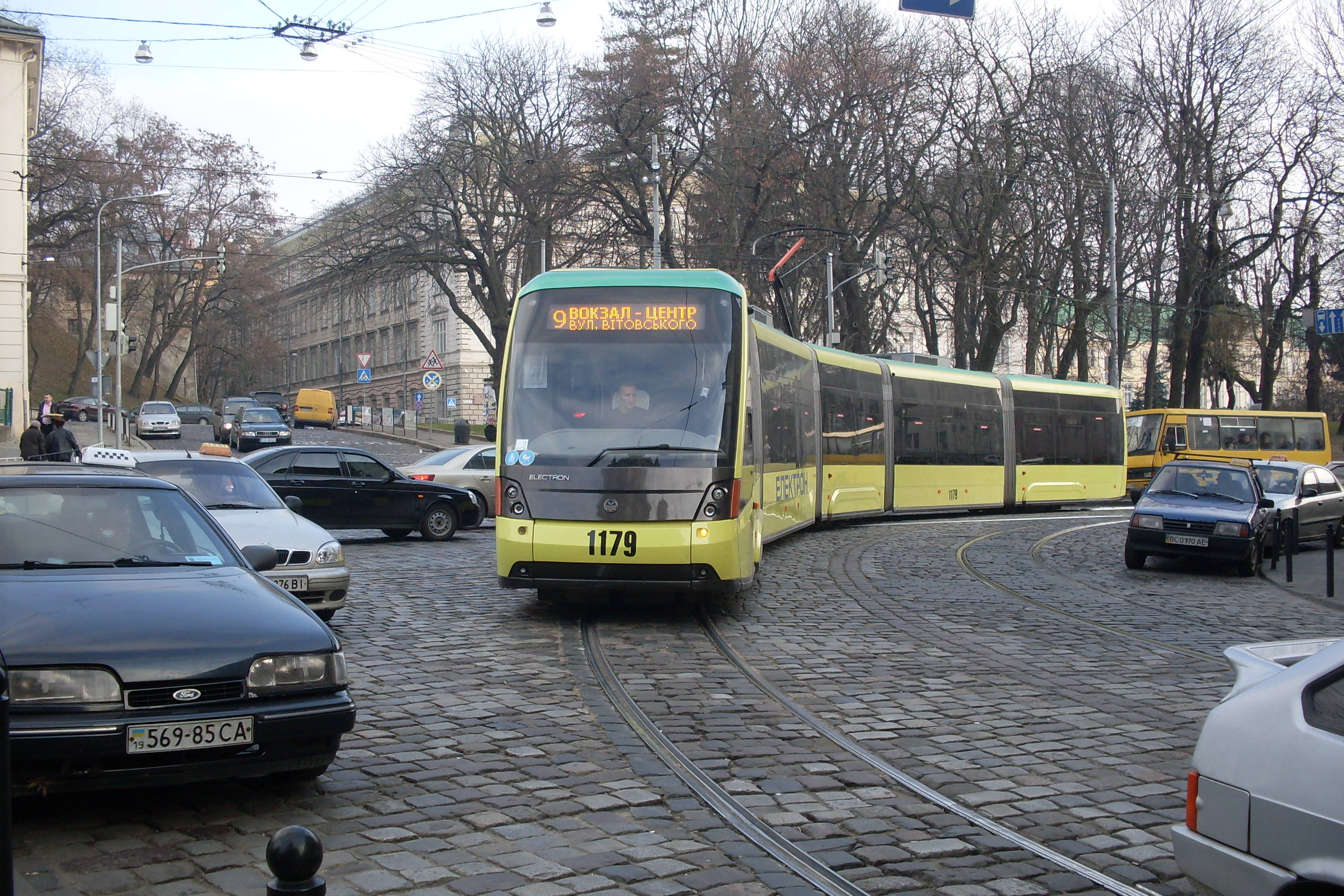
Electron T5L64

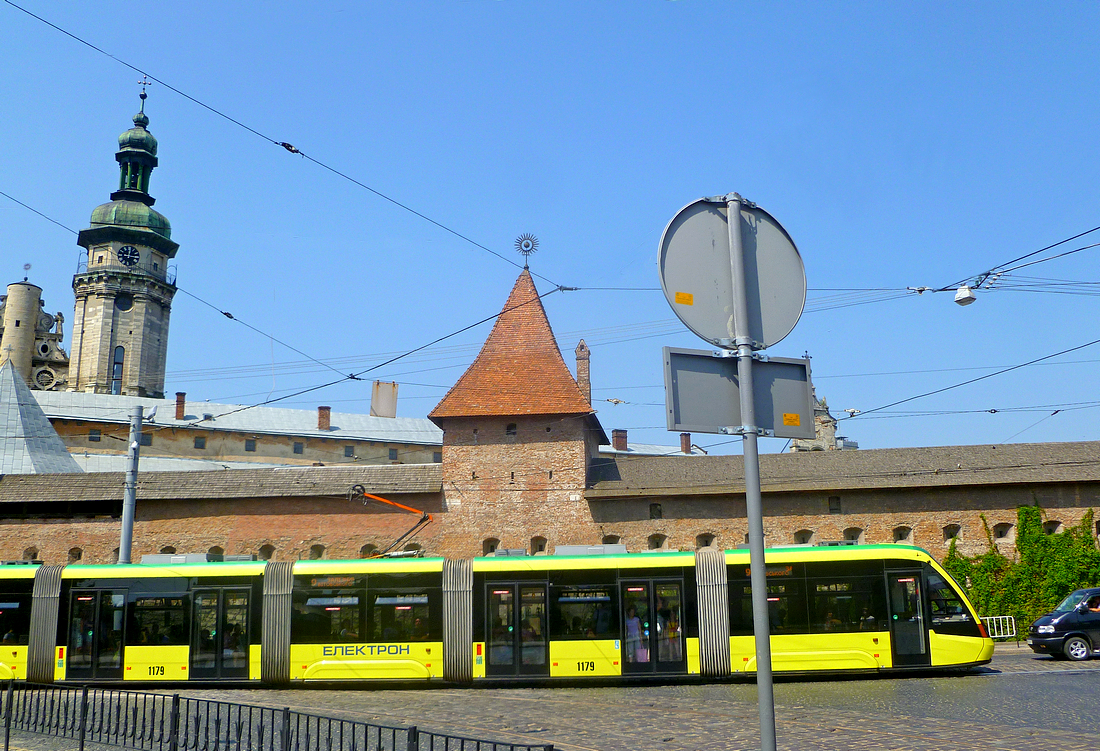
Electron T5L64

== Routes ==
No.	Departure point	Arrival point	Notes
1	Railway Station	Pohulianka	
2	Pasichna Str.	Konovaltsia Str.	
3	Soborna Sqr.	Aquapark	
4	Railway Station	Vernadskoho Str.	
6	Mykolaichuka Str.	Railway Station	
7	Pohulianka	Shevchenka Str.	
8	Soborna Sqr.	Vernadskoho Str.	
9	Torfiana Str.	Railway Station	

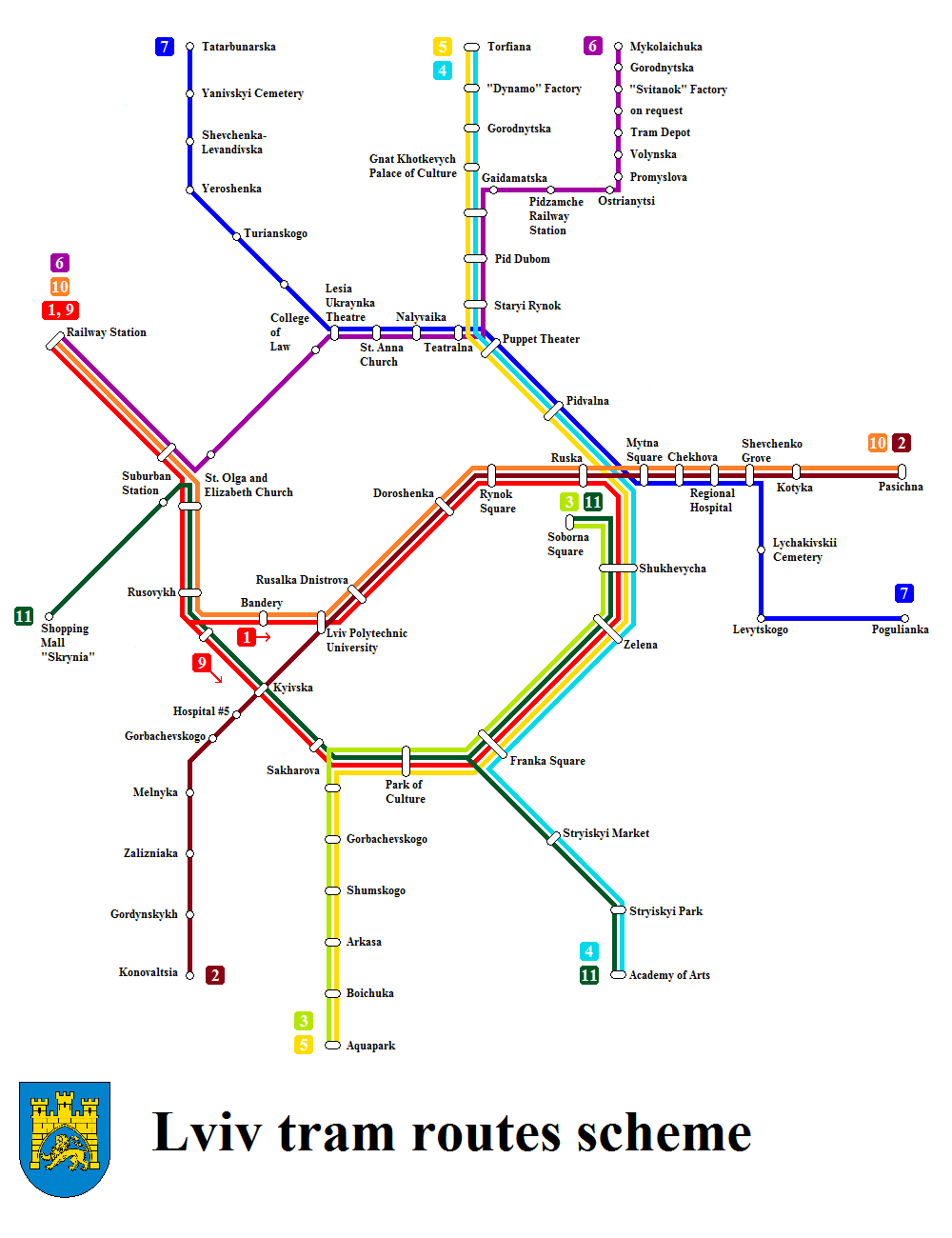
Routes map 2015 (without line 8 that was opened in November 2016)

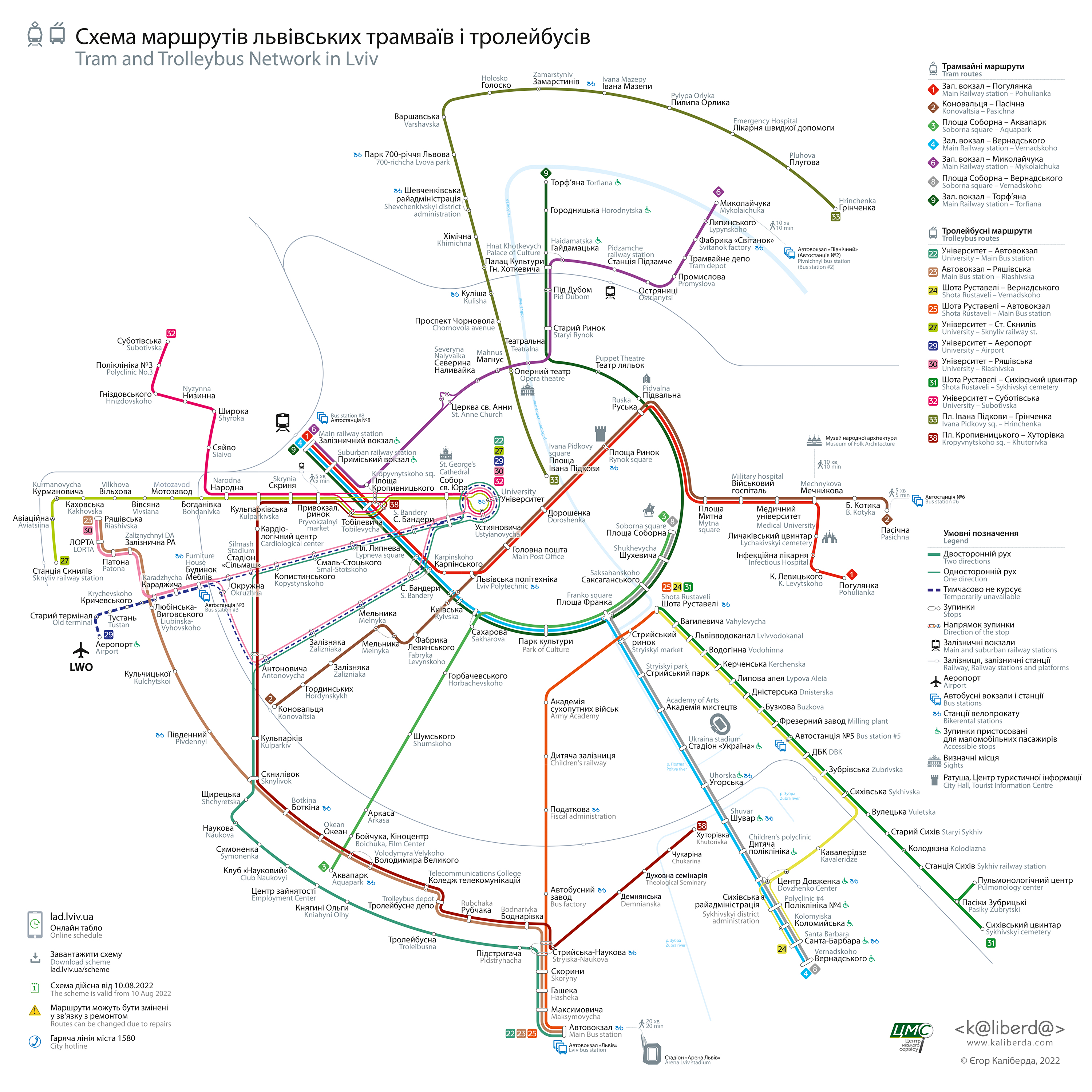
Lviv electric public transport network. Scheme of tram and trolleybus lines (09.2022)

== Future ==
=== Northern extension ===
In 2022 the Executive Committee of the Lviv City Council has approved the implementation of the Ivan Mykolaychuk street reconstruction project designed by the Institute of Spatial Development. One of its goals is to extend the route №6 2,6 km north reaching the Saint Nicholas Hospital and Nezlamni rehabilitation center. All tram stops are meant to be fully accessible and served exclusively by low-floor trams running on green track.

The city council planned to begin construction in 2023, allocating ₴21 million for that in its budget. However due to war and financial problems it was forced to postpone the start of construction works until funding for the first stage of the project could be secured. In 2024 the city received a €5 million grant from the FDA. By this time the estimated cost of the extension was over €50 million. In 2025 Lviv City Council announced it is renewing works to extend the tram line. The extension is set to be completed in 5 stages.

== Ridership ==
In January 2024, passengers on tram routes made 1 243 959 trips, which is 14.8% of the total number of 8,389,072 trips ("Leocard", bank card, single-ride tickets) in all modes of public transport in Lviv. Another 470,637 trips were paid on electric transport routes via the "Privat 24" mobile application, but there is no data on the distribution by types of transport. Assumption that with "Privat 24" payments (approximately 270 000 in trams) in total 1.5 million trips were made in January 2024 on tram routes. Accordingly, it can be expected that passengers will make about 17–18 million trips on tram routes in a year.

Distribution of passenger journeys by all PT operators (January 2024)
Operator	Number	Percentage
Communal ATP-1	4 457 674	50.3%
Lvivelectrotrans (trams and trolleybuses)	2 615 340	29.5%
«Uspikh BM» Ltd.	872 119	9.8%
PJSC «ATP-14630»	316 574	3.6%
«MIRA i K» Ltd.	308 570	3.5%
«Fiakr-Lviv» Ltd.	289 432	3.3%
Total	8 859 709	100%

The table does not include data on journeys paid by Privat24 application (available on trams and trolleybuses), which amounted to 470,637 journeys.

== Fares ==
The fare in Lviv city electric transport (as well as in urban buses) is established on the basis of the decision of the executive committee of the Lviv City Council.

Previously passengers could pay the fare by buying a paper one-time ticket for cash at kiosks or from the driver. Another option was to buy a monthly pass at the kiosks. Passes are divided into types: joint tram and trolleybus pass, and separate tram or trolleybus.

Since 2017, electronic fare payment has been introduced in trams and trolleybuses. Passengers can pay using smartphone by scanning a QR code or via bluetooth. The service is provided by private companies, in particular, the country's largest bank PrivatBank through its Privat24 mobile application.

In the fall of 2023, LCE "Lvivavtodor" (operator of the e-ticketing system "Leocard") announced that cashless payment of fares in all urban public transport in Lviv will start on December 11, 2023. It will be possible to pay cashless for travel with a bank card, an NFC device and a "LeoCard" transport card. It is also possible to pay in cash to the driver upon receiving a ticket-cheque. From December 11, 2023 all fares in all modes of public transport in Lviv community are equal for all passengers, and concession travels are also available in all lines inside Lviv community.

Sales of general non-personalized "LeoCard" transport cards started on November 15, 2023. Cards can be purchased and topped up at "Interpress" kiosks and at "EasyPay" terminals. The cost of the card is UAH 60 + UAH 10 deposit + top-up amount.

Since the introduction of cashless payment in all public transport, the right to discounted travel is granted only if you have a personalized LeoCard. Controllers will check validation and fine passengers for ticketless/unvalidated rides. Passengers paying in cash must obtain a ticket from the driver and keep it throughout the trip, and LeoCard holders must validate the card.

Preferential categories of passengers, pensioners, children under 7 years of age, as well as school students are exempt from paying for travel during the academic year. A discount of 50% of the fare is provided for university students. All of these categories of passengers should have and validate their personalized "LeoCard" for each trip made.

Type of payment	Fare (hryvnia)
Leocard (red, adult)	17
Bank card or NFC device	20
Cash (ticket from driver)	25
Student's Leocard	8.50
Concession Leocard (blue)	0

== See also ==
- Lviv trolleybus
- Lvivelectrotrans
- Lviv bus
- List of light-rail transit systems
