= Electrontrans =

Ukrainian-German manufacturer of public transit vehicles

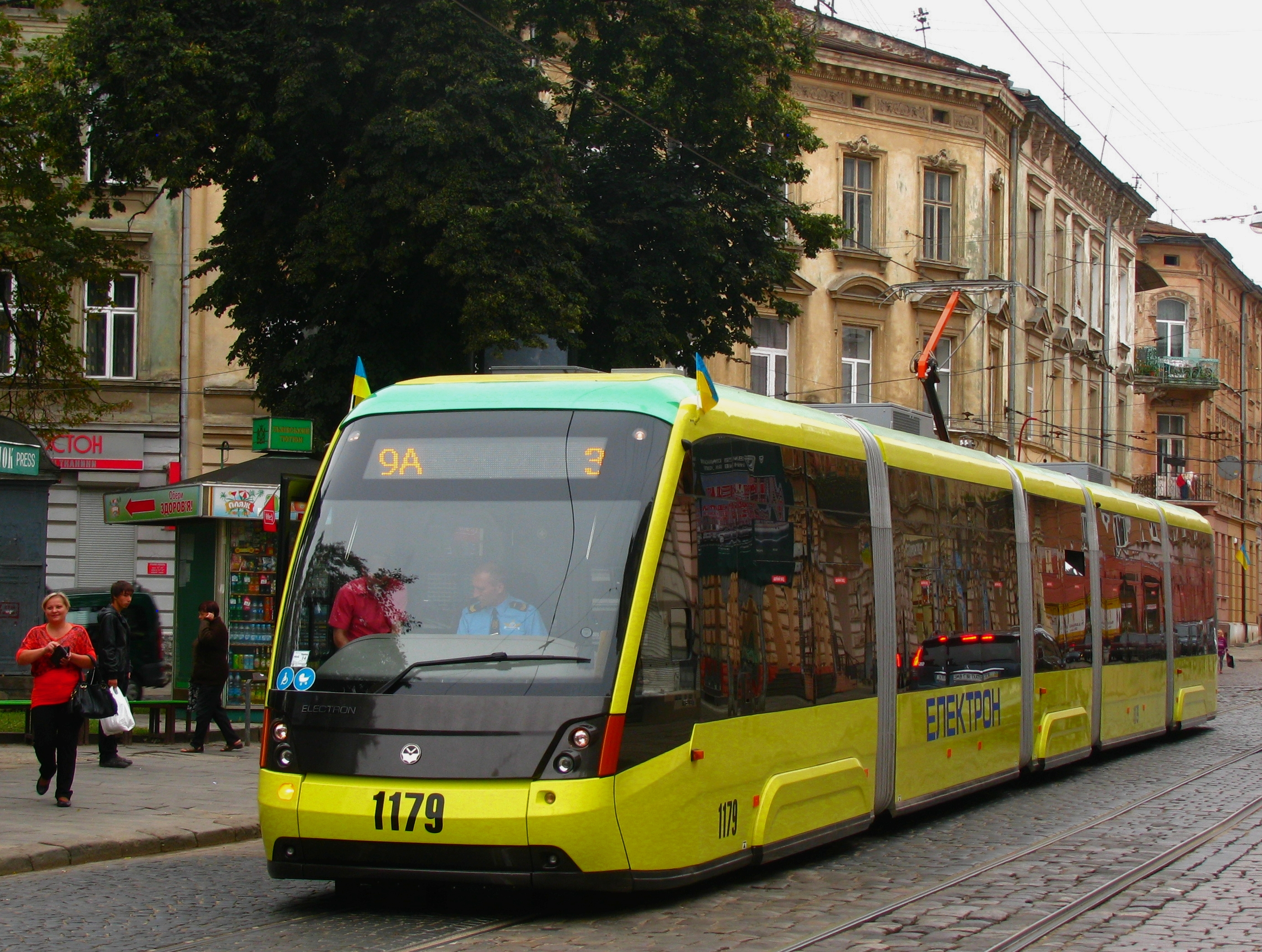
- Electron T5L64 in Lviv
- Native name: Електронтранс
- Romanized name: Elektrontrans
- Type: Limited Liability Company
- Industry: engineering
- Predecessor: LAZ
- Founded: November 18, 2011; 14 years ago in Lviv, Ukraine
- Headquarters: Lviv, Ukraine
- Key people: Vasyl Petsukh; Vitaliy Senin
- Products: trams, buses, trolleybuses, electric buses
- Owner: Avtotechnoproekt
- Parent: Electron Concern
- Website: en.eltrans.electron.ua

Electrontrans (Ukrainian: Електронтранс, Elektrontrans) is a Ukrainian-German manufacturer of public transit vehicles. It was established in 2011 by Electron Concern, TransTec Vetschau GmbH (Germany) and Avtotechnoproekt LLC to replace the defunct Lviv Bus Factory as city's main public transport manufacturer.

The enterprise specializes in the design and manufacture of public transport, special vehicles and spare parts. Electron manufactures tram cars for tracks of different widths for Ukrainian cities and foreign customers. The company includes design and technological bureaus, machining, welding, painting and assembly production. The production capacity of the factory allows to produce 100 vehicles per year.

Electron implements a large-scale program of localization (import substitution) of production of units and aggregates for electric transport. The company carries out the gradual development of the production of tram carts, control systems for traction equipment of trams, trolleybuses and electric buses, couplings for trams and double-link trolleybuses and buses, front independent suspensions, other components and units.

== Owners ==
- Electron Concern — 64%.
- TransTec F&E Vetschau UG (Germany) — 26%.
- Avtotechnoproekt LLC — 24%.

== History ==
- November 11, 2011 - after the destruction of LBF by a Russian Igor Churkin, JV Electrontrans LLC was founded, which took over all the personnel and design potential of LBF.
- June 2013 - produced five-section low-floor tram Electron T5L64 with a track width of 1000 mm.
- July 22, 2013 - Electron T5L64 tram was transferred to Lviv utility company Lvivelectrotrans.
- September 2014 - produced three-section low-floor tram Electron T3L44 with a track width of 1000 mm.
- October 2014 - production of the low-floor trolleybus Electron T19 started.
- June 2015 - the Electrontrans joint venture won a tender for the supply of the Electron E19101 electric bus to Lviv in the amount of ₴8.997 million.
- July 2015 - the company won a tender for the supply of seven Electron T5B64 trams with a track width of 1524 mm to Kyiv in the amount of ₴183.75 million.
- September 2015 - the company won a tender for the production of ten buses for Lviv worth ₴35.85 million.

== Areas of activity ==
=== Main areas ===
The enterprise carries out work on release of 3 directions of transport mechanical engineering.

- Trams
- Trolleybuses
- Electric buses
- Buses
- Electrocars

=== Profile services ===
In addition to the main activities, the company "Electrontrans" provides a range of services for machining metals and manufacturing parts and products on CNC lathes, milling, drilling groups (both according to customer drawings and samples), as well as specialized services:

- Laser cutting of metals
- Pipe bending production
- Bending of metal
- Dyeing

== Model lineup ==
=== Special vehicles ===
- Electron A1 (2012–present)
- Electron A2 (2012–present)
- Electron A3 (2012–present)
- Electron EM-C320.12 (2013–present)
- Electron EM-C440 (2013–present)

=== Buses ===
- Electron A185 (2016–present)
- Electron A291 (in development)
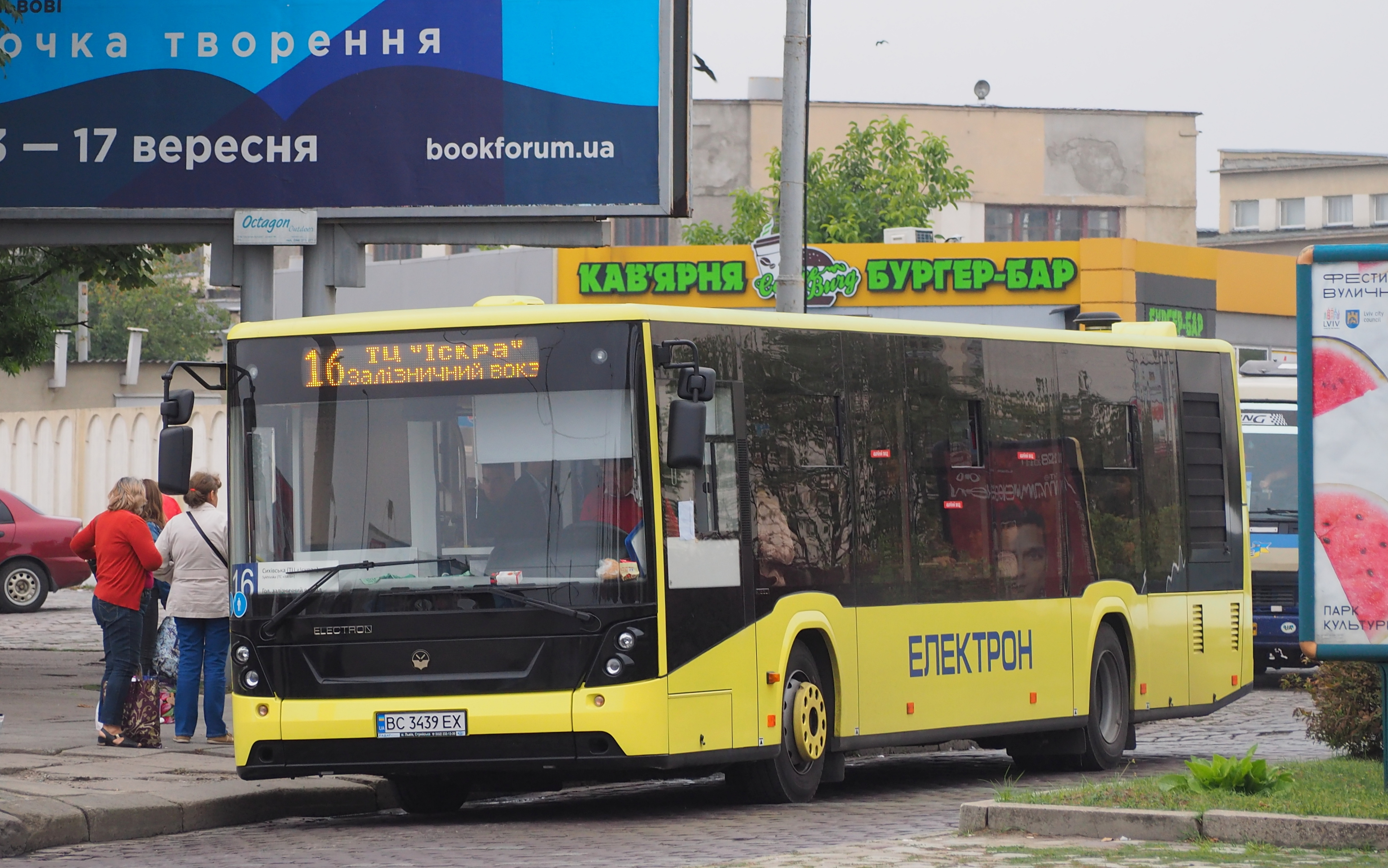
Electron A185 (2016–present)

=== Electric buses ===
- Electron E191 (concept)
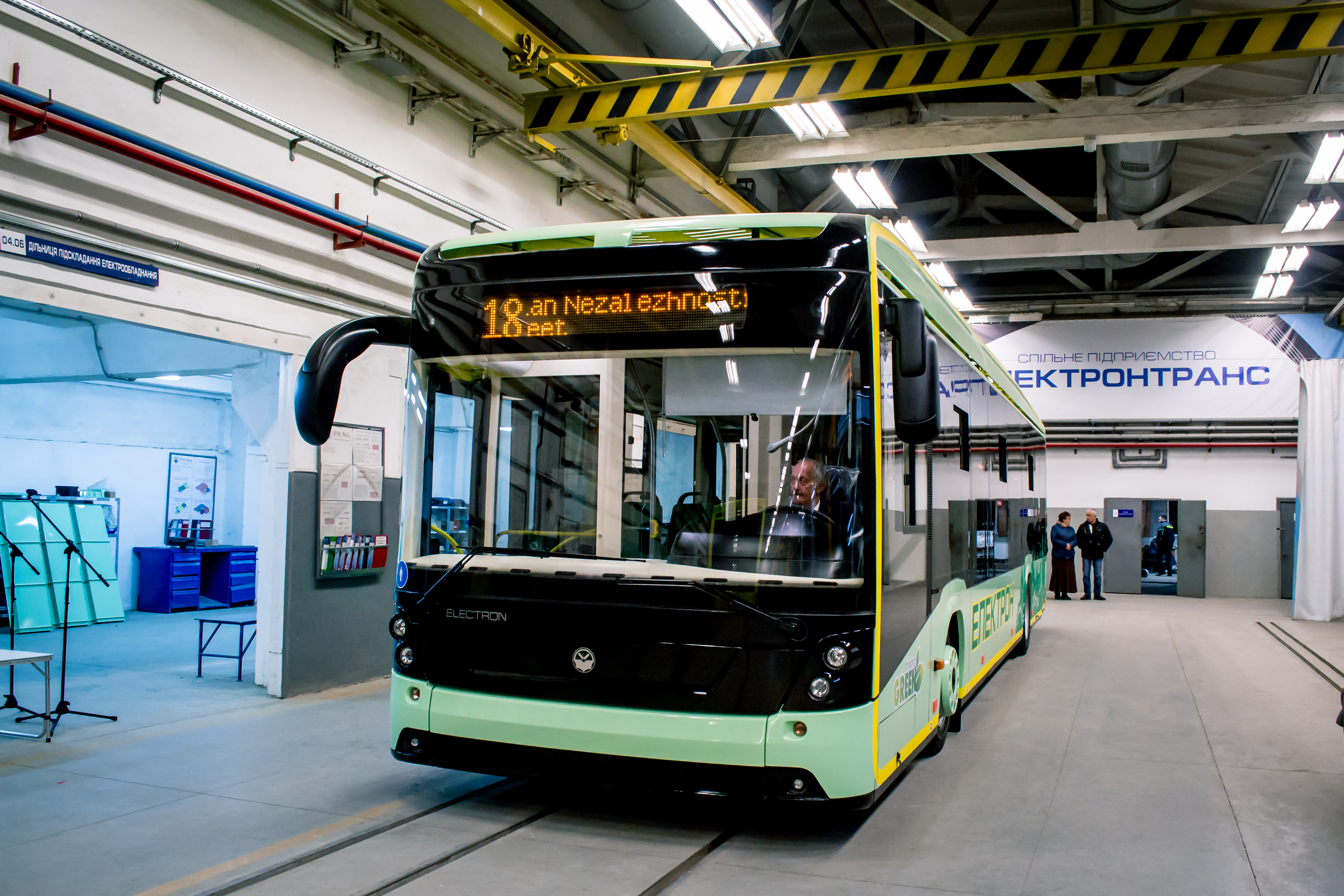
Electron E191 (concept)

=== Trolleybuses ===
- Electron T19 (2014–present)
- Electron T311 (in development)
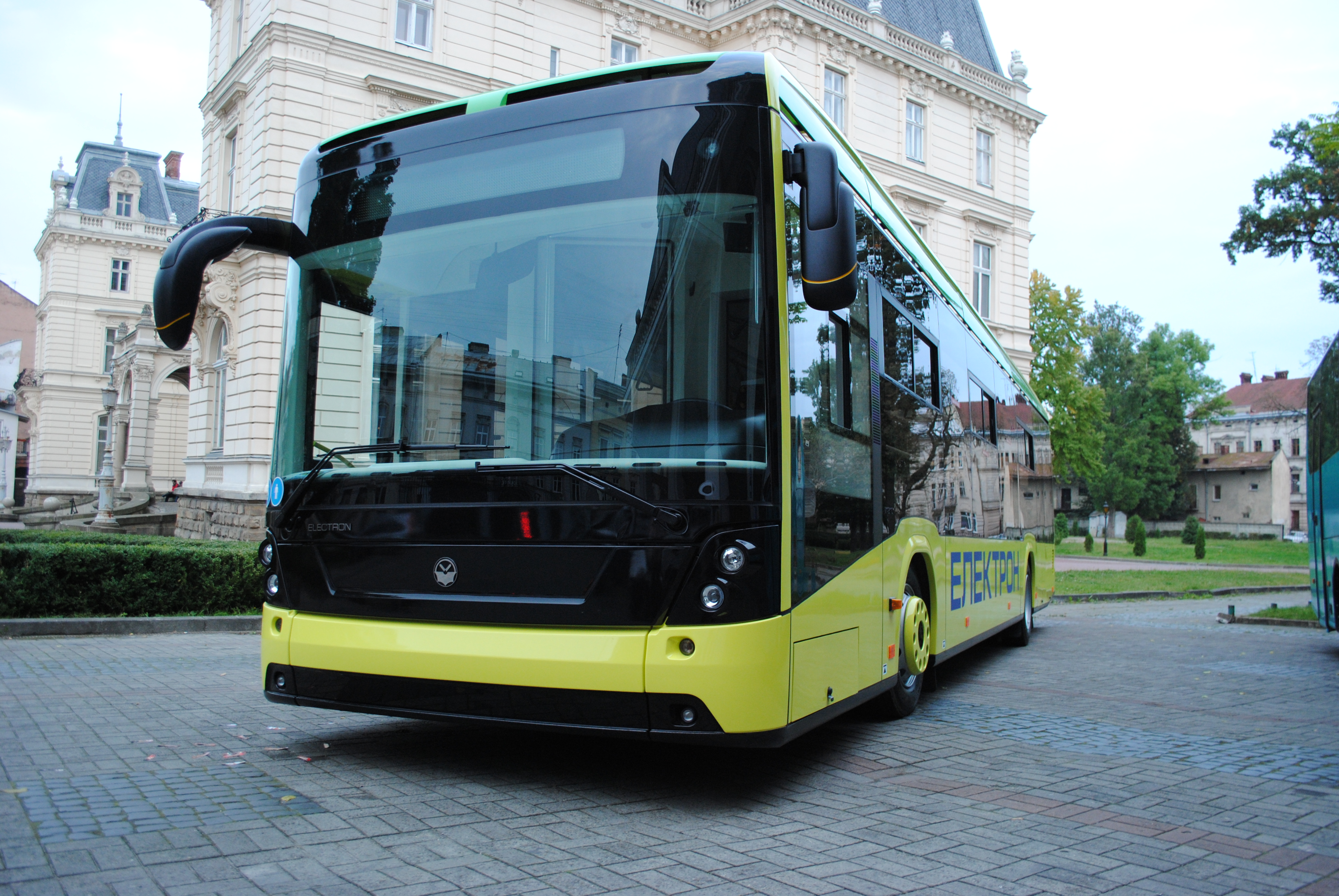
Electron T19 (2014–present)

=== Trams ===
==== 1000mm gauge ====
- Electron T3L44 (2014–2016)
- Electron T5L64 (2013–present)
- Electron T7L86 (concept)
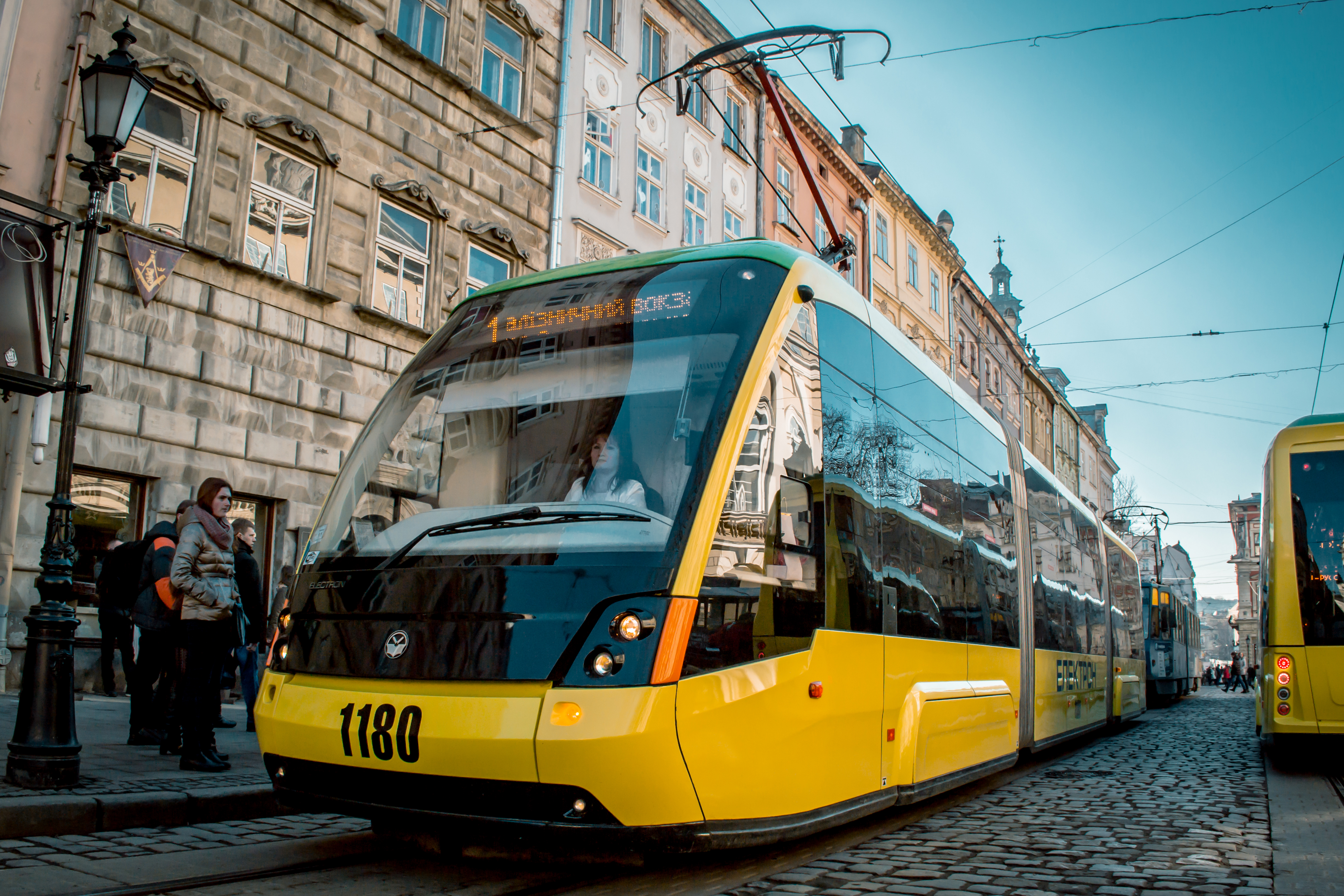
Electron T3L44 (2014–2016)

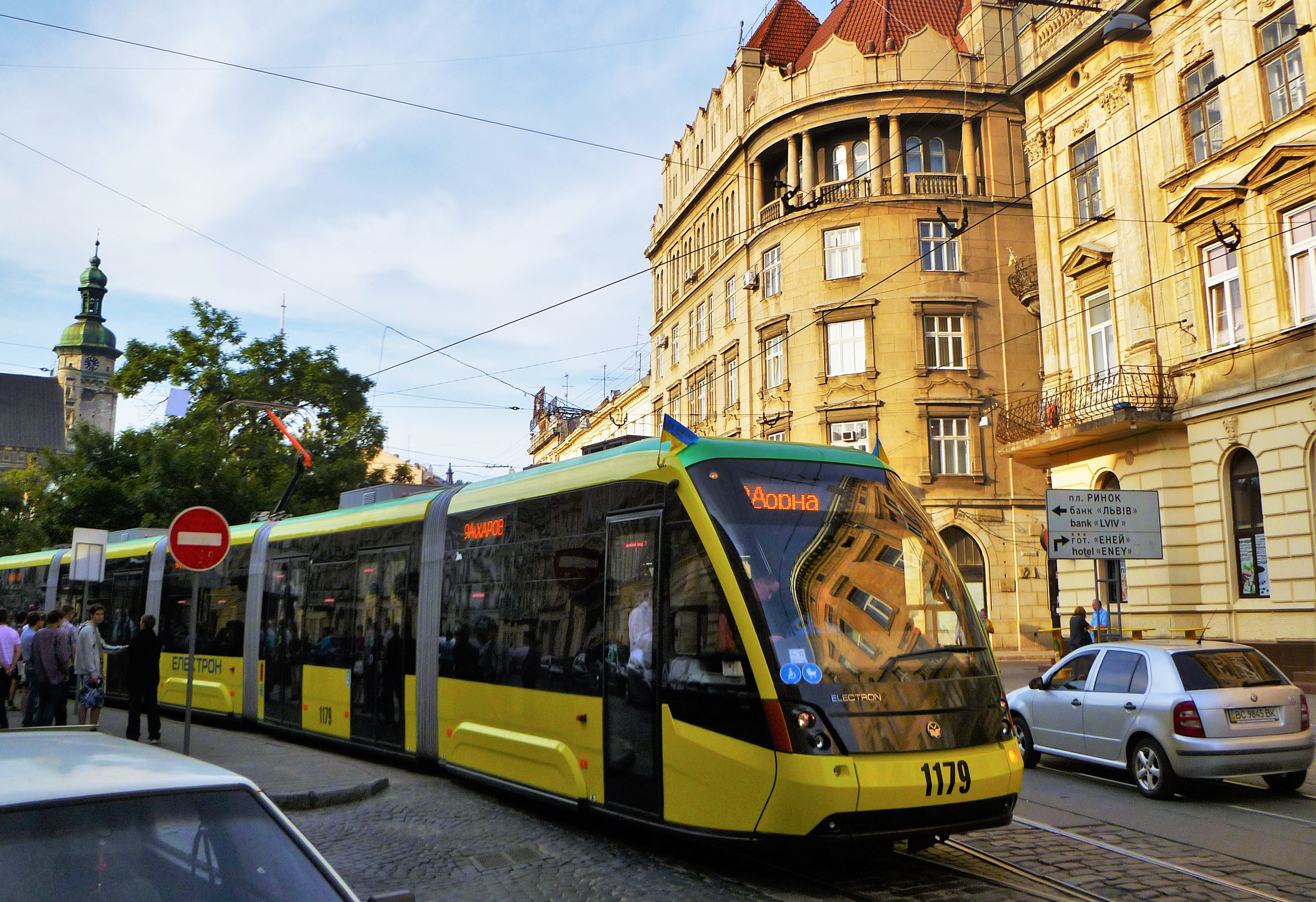
Electron T5L64 (2013–present)

==== 1524mm gauge ====
- Electron T3B44 (concept)
- Electron T5B64 (2015–2017)
- Electron T7B86 (concept)
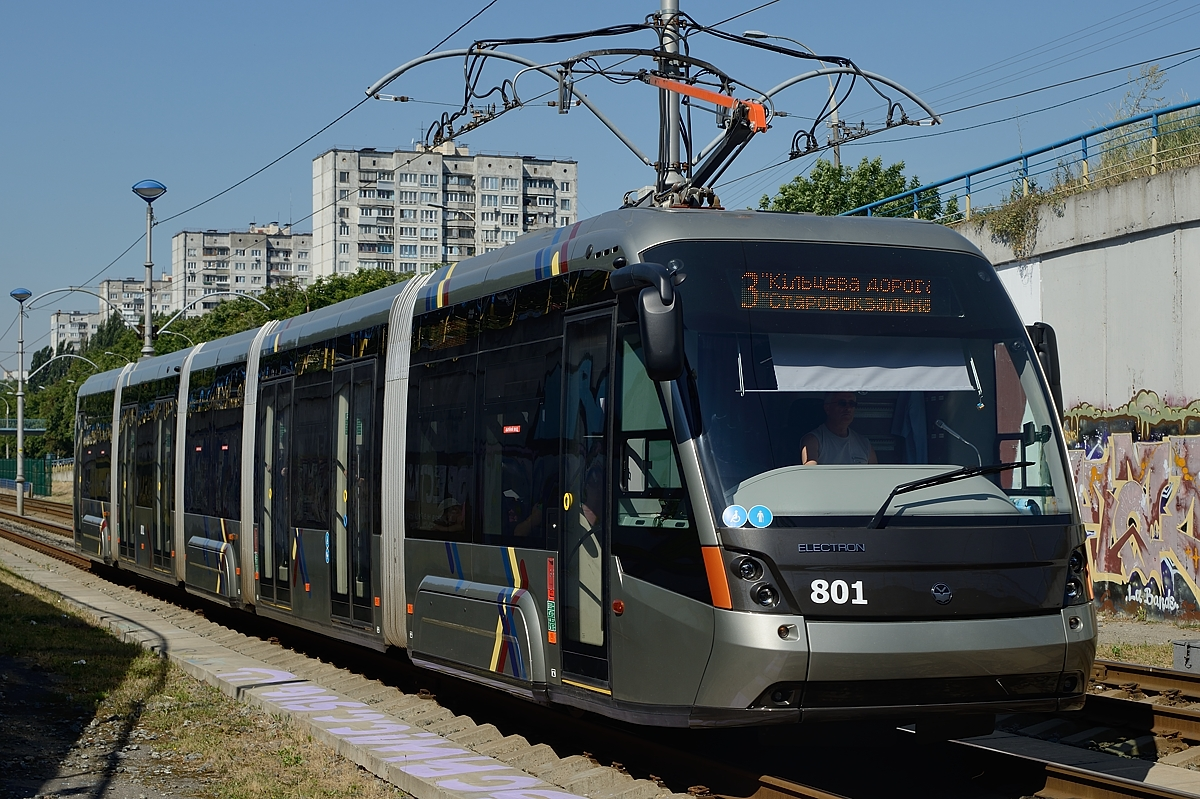
* Electron T5B64 (2015–2017)

== See also ==
- Lviv Bus Factory
- Car classification

== Sources ==
- Про підприємство
- http://uprom.info/news/cars/elektron-zavershiv-vigotovlennya-tramvayiv-po-zamovlennyu-dlya-kiyeva/
