= Stepan Bandera Street (Lviv) =

Thoroughfare in Lviv, Ukraine

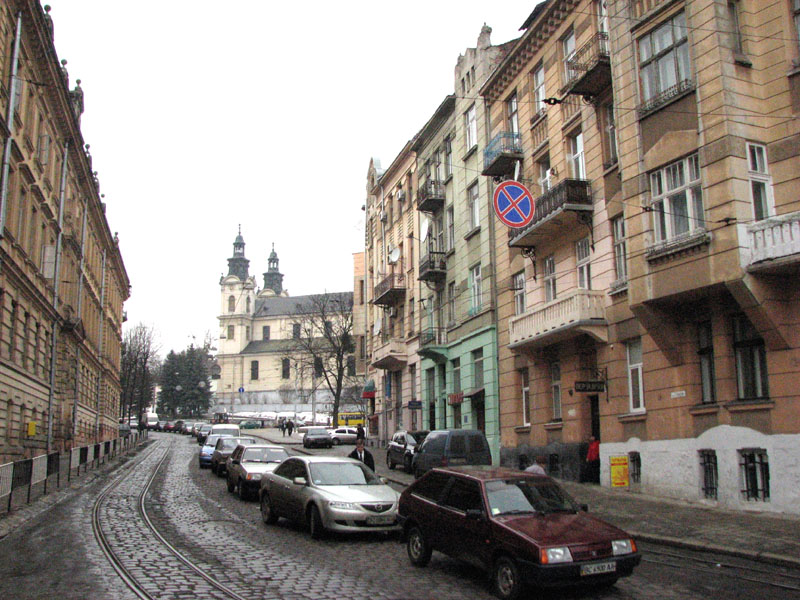
Bandera Street

Stepan Bandera Street (Ukrainian: вулиця Степана Бандери, romanized: vulytsia Stepana Bandery) is one of the main streets of Lviv, Ukraine. It is located on the border of Halytskyi and Franko districts of Lviv. Bandera Street connects Copernicus and Horodotska streets. It is the border of the historical neighborhood Novyi Svit ("New World").

== Architecture ==
The buildings of the street date back to the end of the 19th and beginning of the 20th century. The prevailing architectural styles are secession and eclecticism. The most famous building located on this street is the complex of buildings of Lviv Polytechnic National University, including the main building. The university building was opened in 1877, designed under the supervision of Julian Zachariewicz, with sculptural decoration by Leonard Marconi, and interior paintings by Jan Matejko.

== Name ==
Throughout history, the street's name changed several times. The first name, during 1840–1886, was 'New World' per the historic area nearby. In 1886 the street was named in honor of Leon Ludwik Sapieha, a Polish aristocrat, one of the commanders of the November Uprising and Speaker of the Galician Sejm. It was named Stepan Bandera Street in 1992 (after Ukraine regained independence), after the Ukrainian World War II-era far-right nationalist leader Stepan Bandera.

== Gallery ==
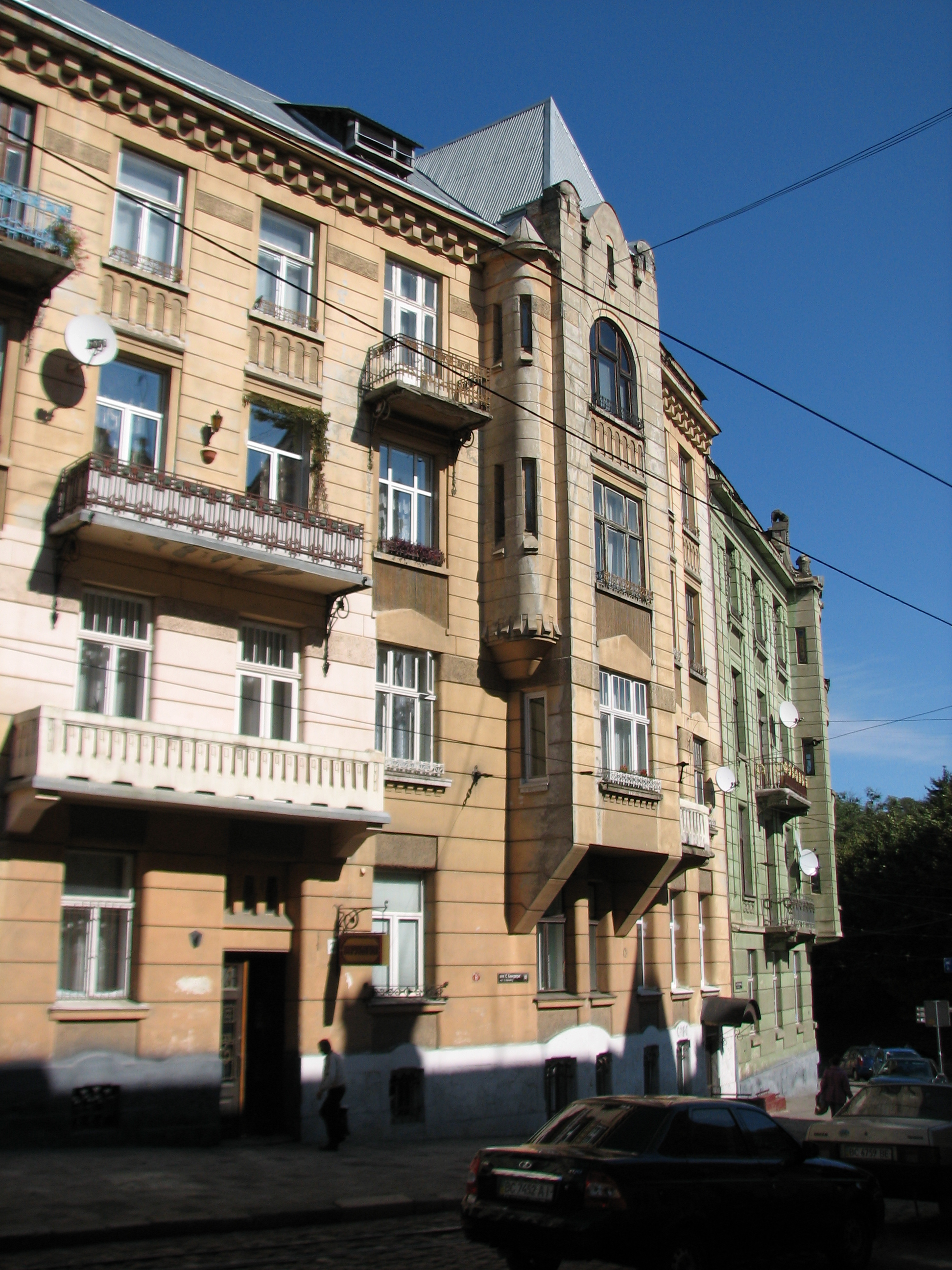
Bandera St. 2

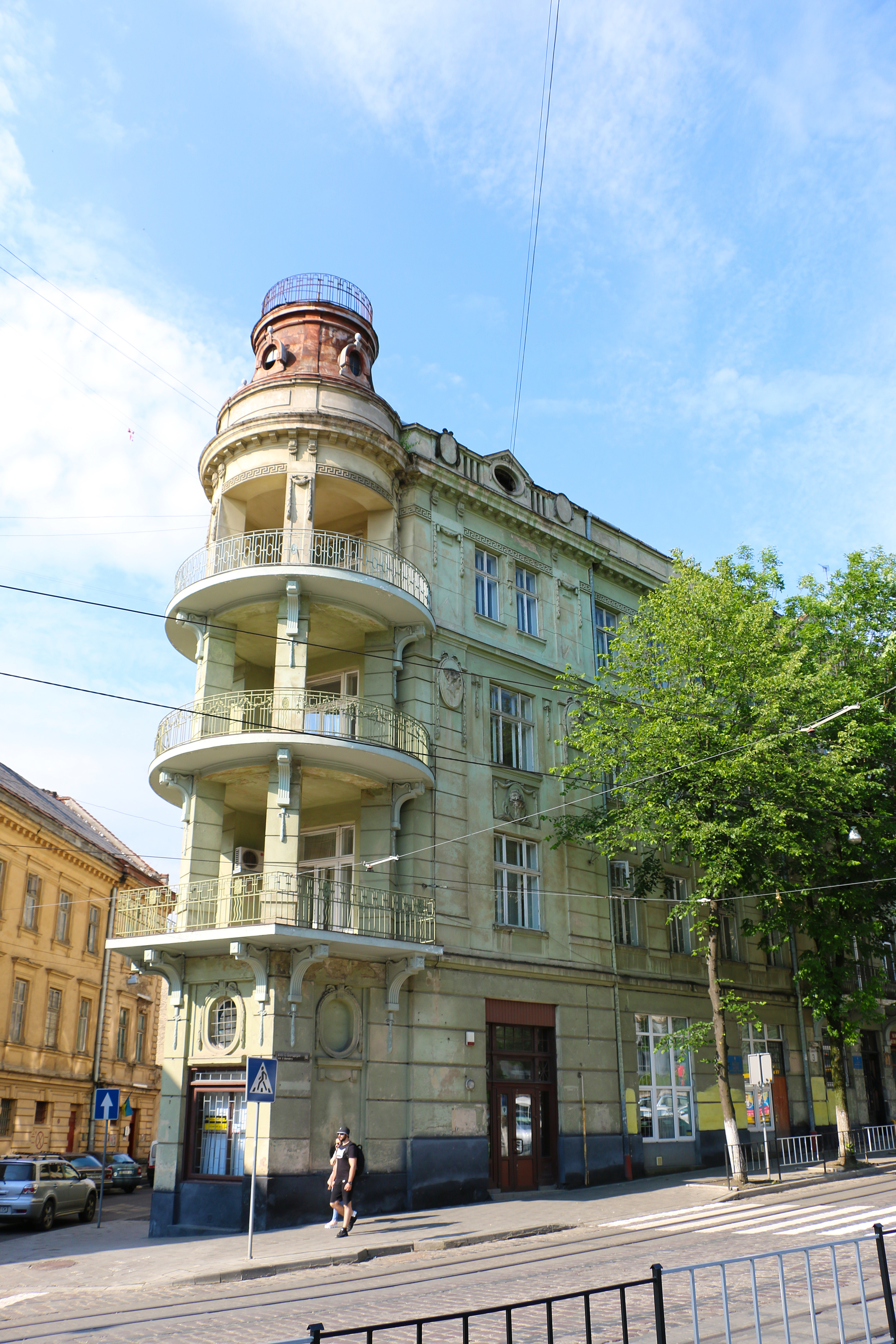
Bandera St. 3

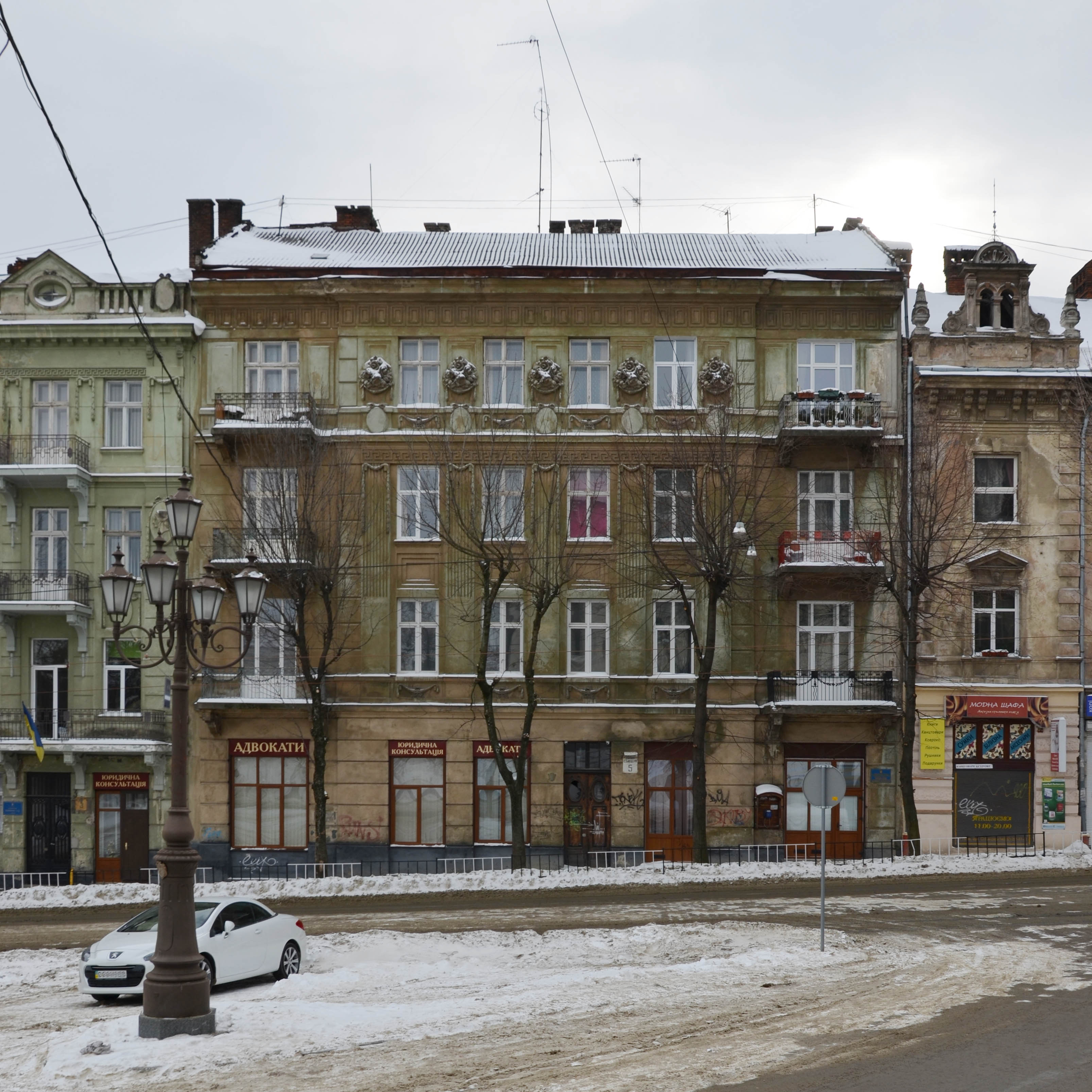
Bandera St. 5

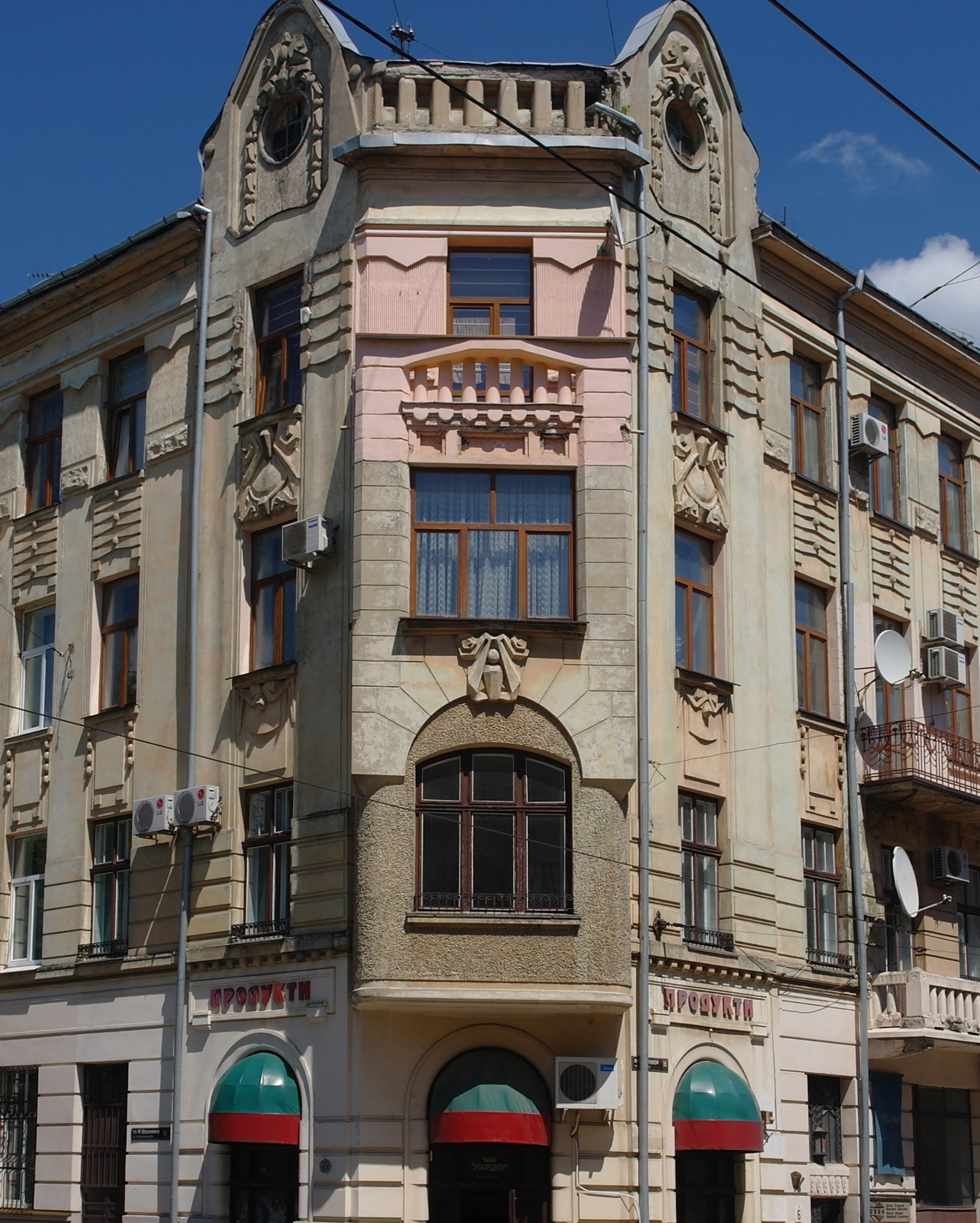
Bandera St. 6

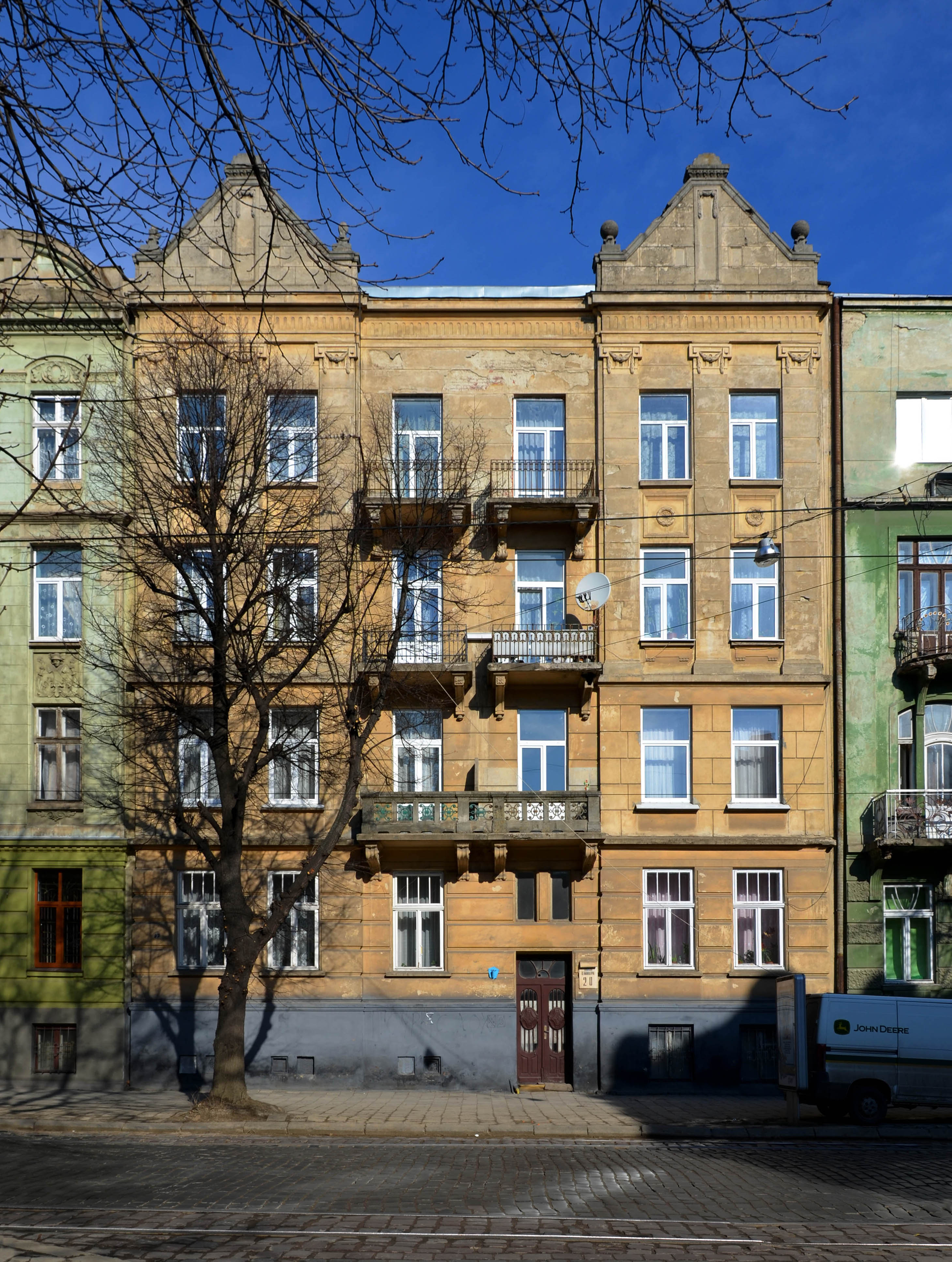
Bandera St. 20

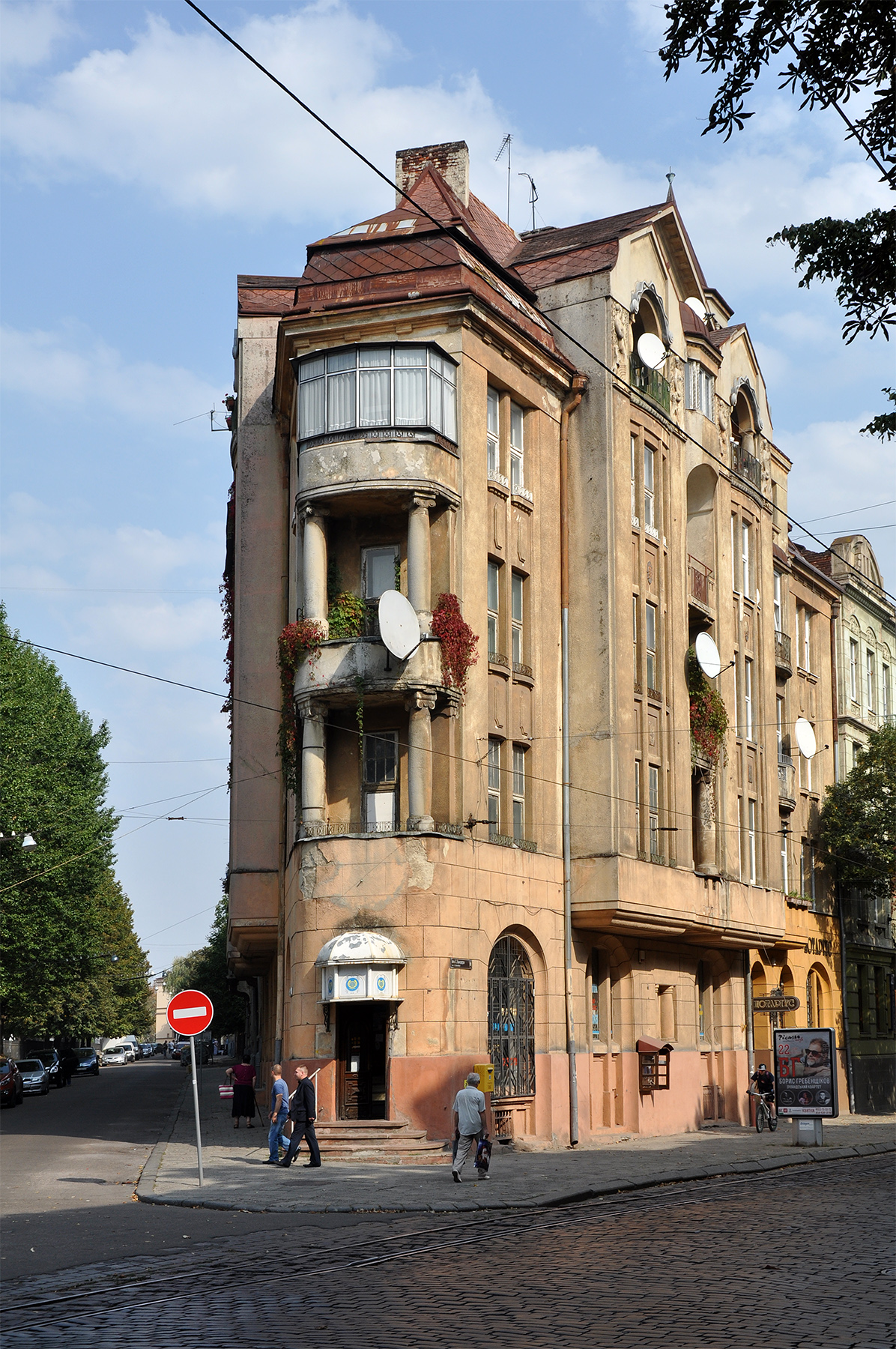
Bandera St. 24

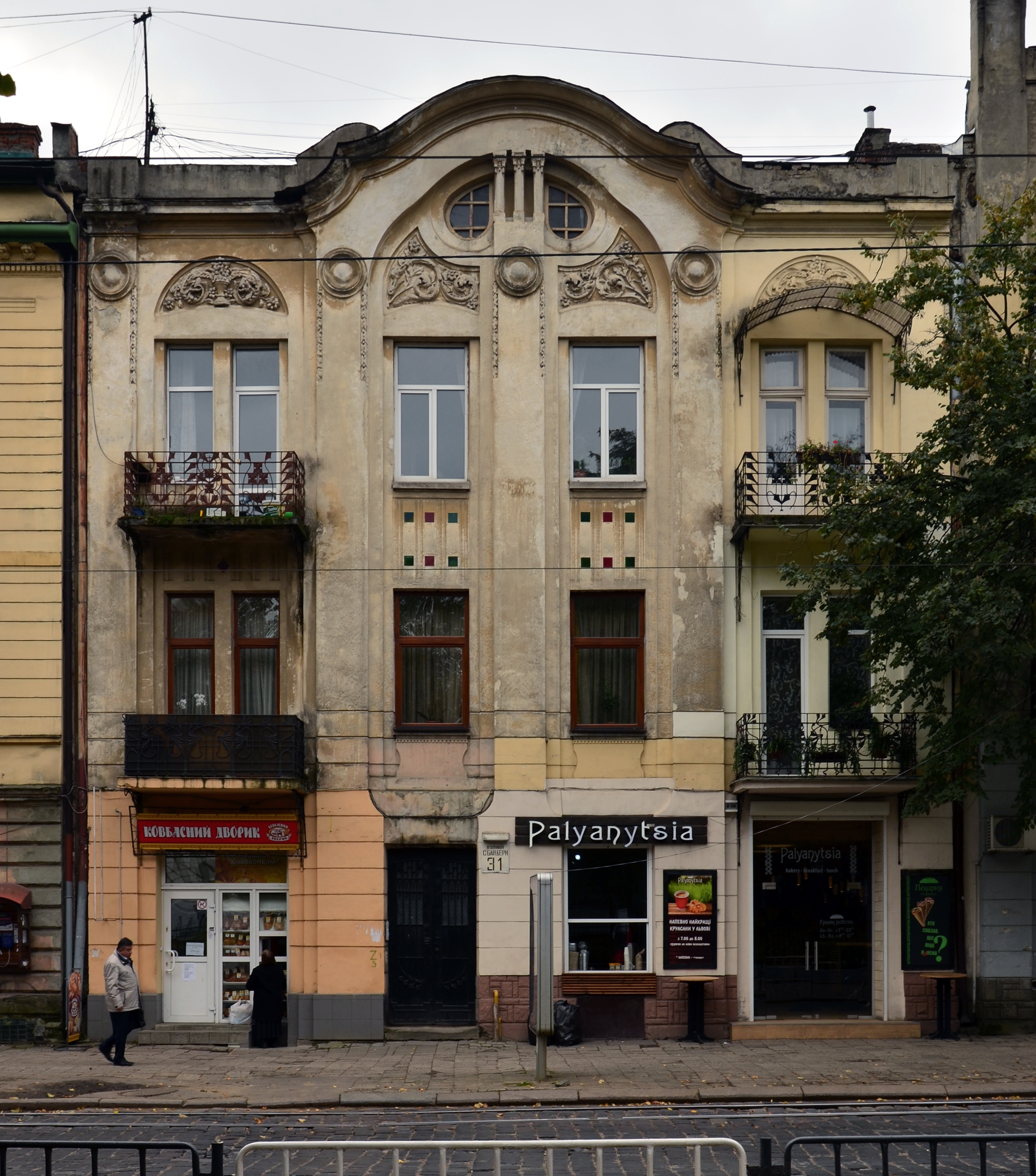
Bandera St. 31

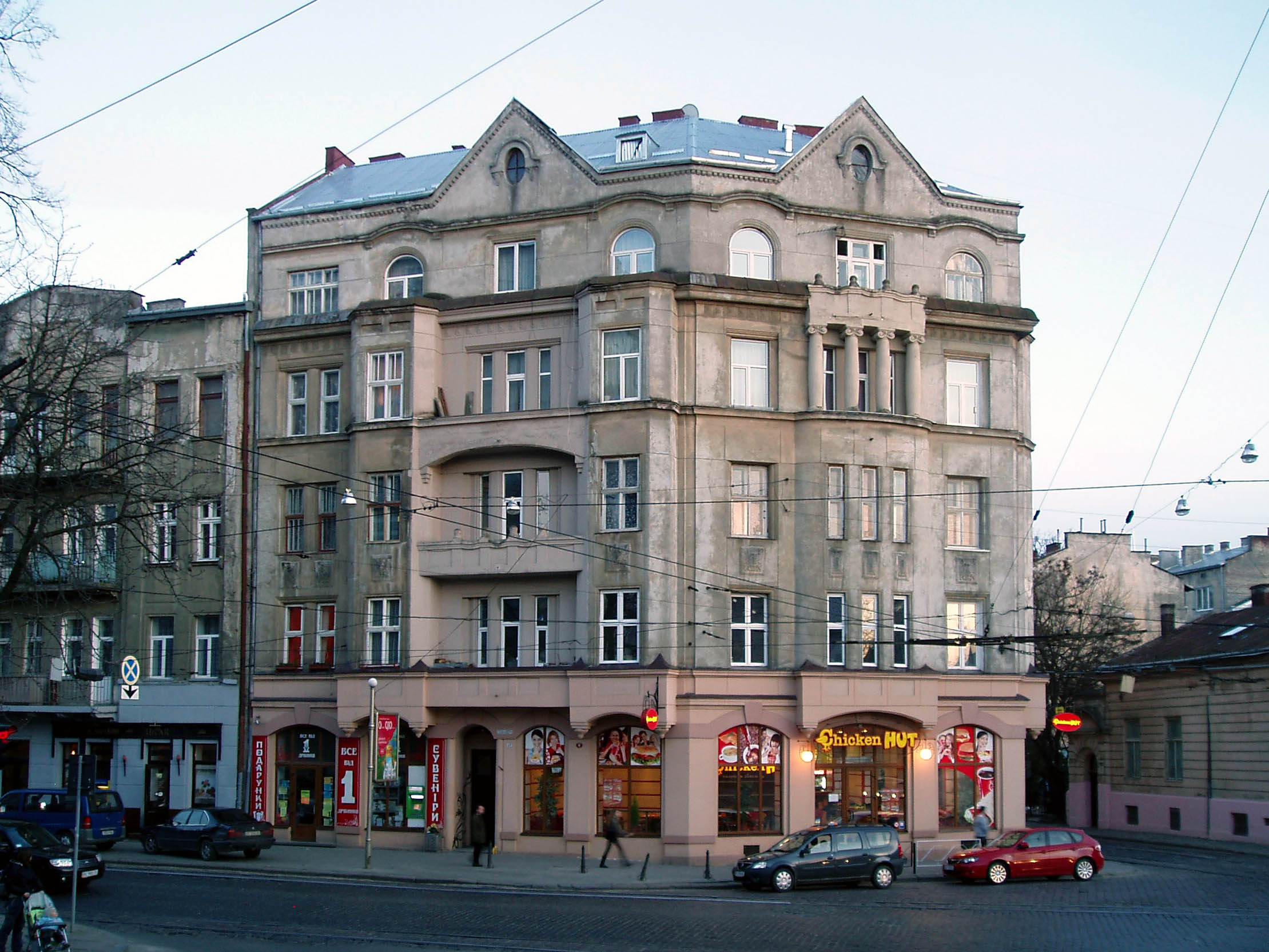
Bandera St. 69

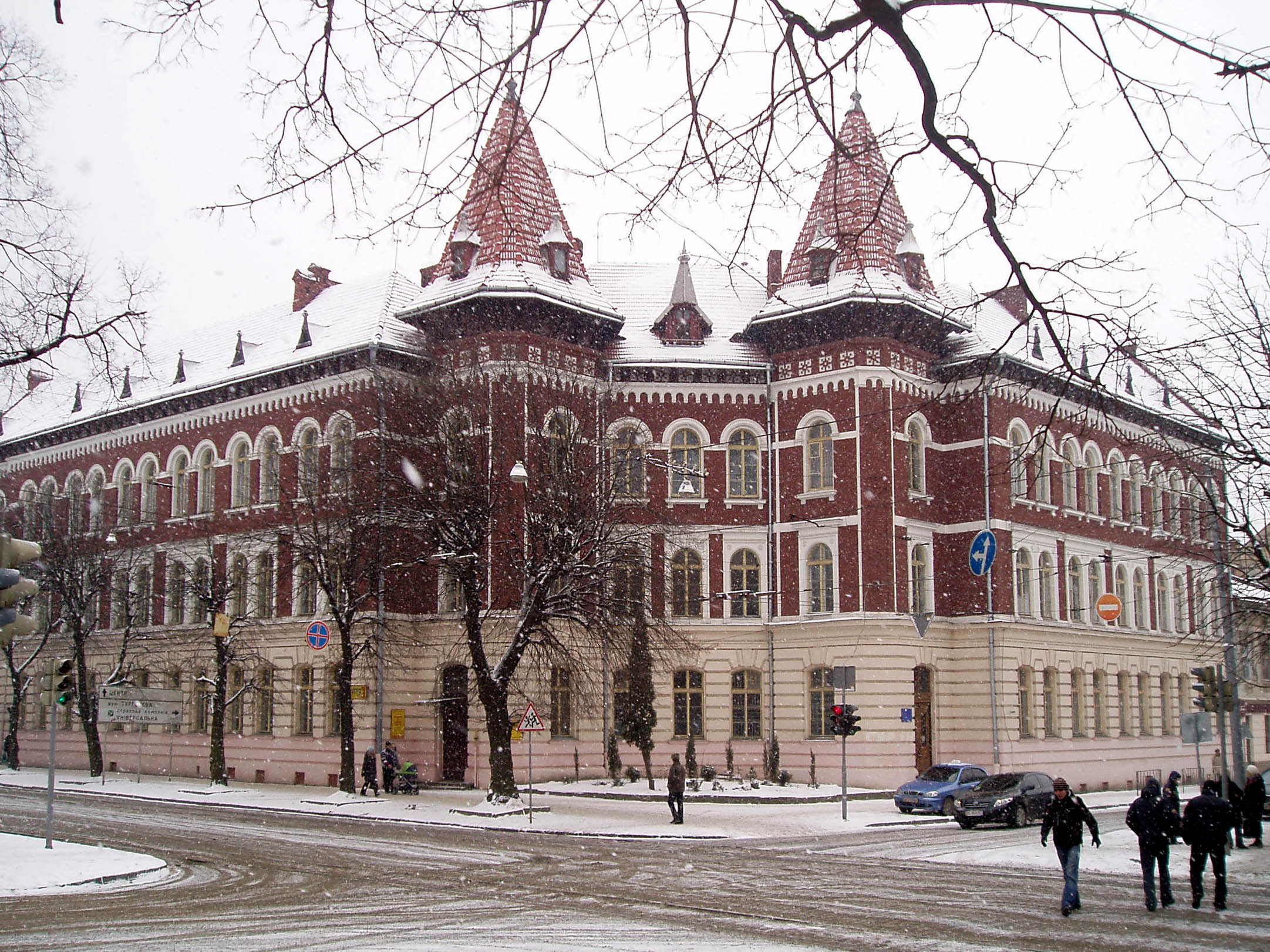
Bandera St. 91

== Sources ==
- Архітектура Львова: Час і стилі. XIII—XXI ст / М. Бевз, Ю. Бірюльов, Ю. Богданова, В. Дідик, У. Іваночко, Т. Клименюк та інші. — Львів : Центр Європи, 2008. — 720 с. — ISBN 978-966-7022-77-8.
- Енциклопедія Львова (За редакцією А. Козицького та І. Підкови) — Львів : Літопис, 2007–2010. — Т. 1–3.
- Ілько Лемко, Михалик В., Бегляров Г. Бандери вул. // 1243 вулиці Львова (1939–2009). — Львів : Апріорі, 2009. — С. 78–80. — ISBN 978-966-2154-24-5.
- Мельник І. В. Широка—Коперника. Вулиця Коперника // Галицьке передмістя та південно-східні околиці королівського столичного міста Львова. — Львів : Апріорі, 2012. — С. 56–58. — (Львівські вулиці і кам'яниці) — ISBN 978-617-629-076-6.
