= Trolleybuses in Lviv =

Electric trolleybus network in Lviv, Ukraine

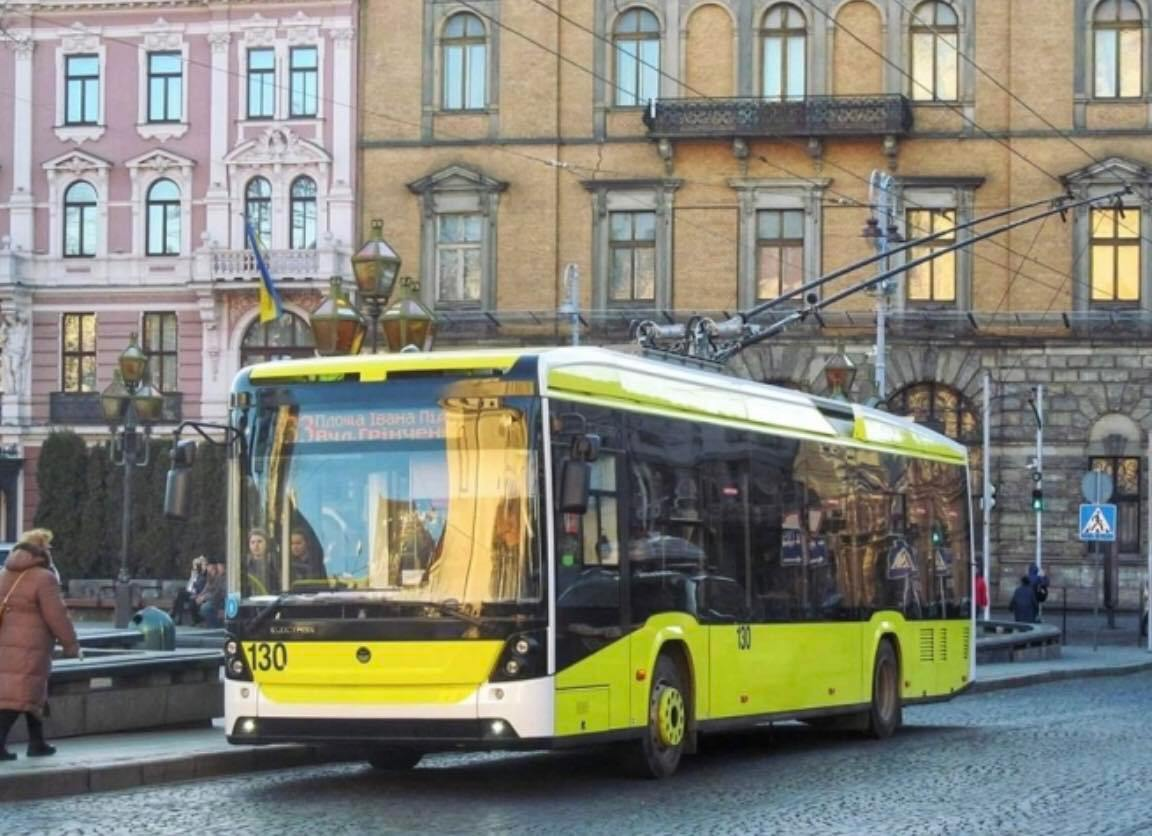

Overview
- Owner: Lviv City Council
- Locale: Lviv, Ukraine
- Transit type: Trolleybus
- Number of lines: 10 (11) (from March 2022)
- Daily ridership: 37 000 (approx.) in January 2024
- Website: www.let.org.ua

Operation
- Began operation: 27 November 1952
- Operator: Lvivelectrotrans
- Number of vehicles: 72 of 115

Technical
- System length: 136 km (2022)
- Electrification: 600V DC
- Average speed: 13 km/h

Trolleybuses are part of the public transport system of Lviv, Ukraine. The trolleybus network is operated by Lvivelectrotrans - a municipal enterprise, that is the operator of trams and trolleybuses in the city. LET is owned by the Lviv City Council. As of January 2023, the length of the contact network is 136 km long, and (as of January 2021) the length of the route network is 169 km. As of 2021, 24,678,300 paid passengers (including 2,785,623 students) used trams and trolleybuses. In 2021, trolleybuses performed 3.29 million kilometers of transportation work (vehicle-km). In January 2024, 900,744 passengers were transported by trolleybus routes.

== History ==
The first idea of introducing trolleybus traffic in Lviv dates back to April 1909. It is connected with the construction of a tram line to the High Castle. In cause of the complex topography of the route of the future line, the head of the Lviv Tramway, Józef Tomicki, proposed to build a "railless electric omnibus" line instead of a tram line, that is, a trolleybus.

On November 27, 1952, regular trolleybus traffic on route No. 1 (Railway Station — Mickiewicz Square) was opened. At that time, the rolling stock consisted of five MTB-82D vehicles that ran on the line at intervals of every 20 minutes.

In 1953, trolleybus route No. 2 (Mickievicz Square — Bohdanivka) was opened, with a length of 3.3 km. In 1954, this route was extended to Sknyliv railway station. In the same year, a line was laid from Mickiewicz Square along Shota Rustaveli and Stryiska to modern Hasheka Street (stop "7's km"), in three years - from Mickiewicz Square to Novyi Lviv, and in another year - to Holosko.

In June 1963, the first LAZ 695T trolleybus, assembled at the Lviv Bus Plant, on the basis of a bus body with electrical equipment from decommissioned old MTB-82D trolleybuses, drove onto the streets of Lviv.

On March 1, 2019, the Lviv City Council signed. a guarantee agreement with the EBRD regarding the purchase of 50 new trolleybuses manufactured by "Electron-trans" and the partial renewal of the trolleybus depot.

On November 4, 2019, the first 10 Electron T19102 trolleybuses were presented at the trolleybus depot. The new trolleybuses have video surveillance cameras, USB ports for recharging phones and gadgets. Trolleybuses are equipped with two air conditioners for the interior and for the driver's cabin.

In 2020-2021, LET and the authorities of Lviv intended to purchase 70-100 battery trolleybuses (with in-motion charging) with IFC loan funds, but city council members did not support this decision, citing too high interest rates. This project is now suspended.

Lviv is the first city in Ukraine that started to use modern trolleybus catenary and spare parts (forks and crossings) of Elektroline company (Czech Republic). It was installed in 2021 during the reconstruction of the trolleybus catenary network on Kulparkivska street. The project was implemented with EBRD loan funds.

== List of existing routes ==
As of 08.2022 Lviv trolleybus system consists of 11 routes:

No.	Departure point	Point of arrival	Vehicles in service		Intervals (min)		Route length (km)	Notes
No.	Departure point	Point of arrival	Weekday	Weekend	Weekday	Weekend	Full lap	Notes
22	Lviv University	Avtovokzal (Main bus station)	10	8	10	12	10,4	
23	Riashivska str.	Avtovokzal (Main bus station)	7	6	10	12	8,6	
24	Shota Rustaveli str.	Santa Barbara	8	6	10	12	8,4	
25	Shota Rustaveli str.	Avtovokzal (Main bus station)	7	7	8	8	6,2	
27	Lviv University	Sknyliv train station	1	0	50	-	7,4	
29	Lviv University	Lviv Airport	-	-	8	8		Temporarily out of service
30	Lviv University	Riashivska str.	8	5	10	10	6,4	
31	Shota Rustaveli str.	Pulmonology Center	3	2	40	60	11,7	
32	Lviv University	Subotivska str.	8	6	8	10	6,6	
33	Ivan Pidkova square	Hrinchenka str.	10	8	5	8	6,1	
38	Kropyvnytskoho square	Khutorivka str.	8	7	8	10	9,5	
11	Total		70	55			81,3	

From July 1, 2019, a new numbering of trolleybus lines (routes) was introduced to avoid duplication in the numbering of different types of transport (especially with trams). Each route, regardless of whether it is operated by buses, trams or trolleybuses, has its own unique number, as the first stage of the transition to uniform numbering of routes for all types of public transport. Numbers 1 to 19 are reserved for tram routes, numbers 20 to 39 are reserved for trolleybus routes. For decades before this change tram and trolleybus routes in Lviv had the same numbering of lines (2 and 2, 3 and 3, etc.). The problem still exists with bus routes that also starts from No. 1A to 63, and duplicate all tram and trolleybus route numbers.

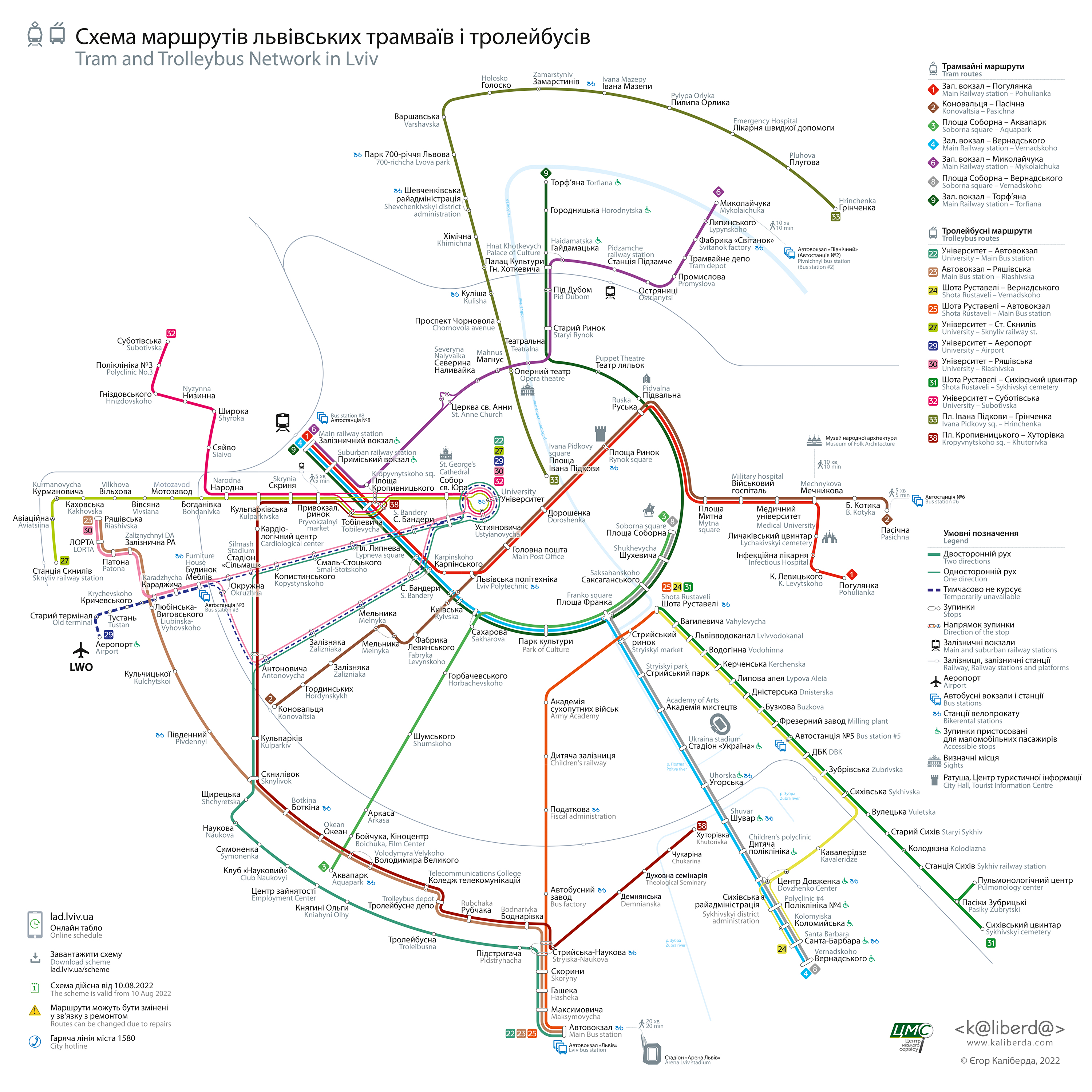
Tram and trolleybus network in Lviv 2022

== Rolling stock ==
Rolling stock of trolleybuses in operation as of August 2022:

Brand	Model	Year of procurement	Number of vehicles	Low floor	Air conditioning
Skoda	14Tr	1988-2013	21	No	No
LAZ	E183	2006, 2008	7	Yes	No
Electron	T19101	2014, 2016	2	Yes	No
Electron	T19102	2015, 2016, 2019	58	Yes	Yes (50)
Electron	E19	2015	1		
4	Total		89	68 LF	50 with AC

Other brands and models of trolleybuses (of total 115) are withdrawn from operation.

70 trolleybuses were in operation on the routes (morning rush hour) on August 10, 2022.

=== List of rolling stock over past decades ===
Years	1990	2000	2010	2020
Number of vehicles	243	119	85	122
Prevailing models	Skoda 9Tr, Skoda14Tr	Skoda 14Tr, LAZ 52522	Skoda 14Tr, LAZ E183, LAZ 52522	Skoda 14Tr, Electron T19
Network length, km	122	117	117	132

== Fares ==
The fare in Lviv city electric transport (as well as in urban buses) is established on the basis of the decision of the executive committee of the Lviv City Council.

Previously passengers could pay the fare by buying a paper one-time ticket for cash at kiosks or from the driver. Another option was to buy a monthly pass at the kiosks. Passes are divided into types: joint tram and trolleybus pass, and separate tram or trolleybus.

Since 2017, electronic fare payment has been introduced in trams and trolleybuses. Passengers can pay using smartphone by scanning a QR code or via bluetooth. The service is provided by private companies, in particular, the country's largest bank PrivatBank through its Privat24 mobile application.

In the fall of 2023, LCE "Lvivavtodor" (operator of the e-ticketing system "Leocard") announced that cashless payment of fares in all urban public transport in Lviv will start on December 11, 2023. It will be possible to pay cashless for travel with a bank card, an NFC device and a "LeoCard" transport card. It is also possible to pay in cash to the driver upon receiving a ticket-cheque. From December 11, 2023 all fares in all modes of public transport in Lviv community are equal for all passengers, and concession travels are also available in all lines inside Lviv community.

Sales of general non-personalized "LeoCard" transport cards started on November 15, 2023. Cards can be purchased and topped up at "Interpress" kiosks and at "EasyPay" terminals. The cost of the card is UAH 60 + UAH 10 deposit + top-up amount.

Since the introduction of cashless payment in all public transport, the right to discounted travel is granted only if you have a personalized LeoCard. Controllers will check validation and fine passengers for ticketless/unvalidated rides. Passengers paying in cash must obtain a ticket from the driver and keep it throughout the trip, and LeoCard holders must validate the card.

Preferential categories of passengers, pensioners, children under 7 years of age, as well as school students are exempt from paying for travel during the academic year. A discount of 50% of the fare is provided for university students. All of these categories of passengers should have and validate their personalized "LeoCard" for each trip made.

Type of payment	Fare
Leocard (red, adult)	13 UAH
Bank card or NFC device	15 UAH
Cash (ticket from driver)	20 UAH
Student's Leocard	6,5 UAH
Concession Leocard (blue)	0 UAH

Coverage of expenses (cost recovery) by passengers (who are obliged to pay the fare) of Lvivelectrotrans, including users of trams and trolleybuses, varies between 25 and 33% in the last 10 years. The rest of the sum is compensated from the city budget for the transportation of privileged categories of passengers. However, there is no system for clearing these passengers, neither at the local nor at the national level. From time to time, a sample count is made, and they are submitted to the state statistics service of the Lviv region. On the basis of a special formula, the ratio of the number of privileged passengers relative to paid passengers is derived. Based on this coefficient, the amount of necessary compensation to the carrier is calculated. Such a system is extremely imperfect. Since 1993, by a resolution of the Government of Ukraine from May 17, 1993 No. 354, free travel in urban electric transport has been introduced for pensioners. According to the Constitution of Ukraine, these expenses should be compensated from the state budget, but in all years the amount of necessary funds did not exceed 60% of the need. Since 2016, the Government has stopped providing such compensation, and the provision of it has completely switched to local budgets.

== Ridership ==
In January 2024, passengers on trolleybus routes made 900,744 trips, which is 10.7% of the total number of 8,389,072 trips ("Leocard", bank card, single-ride tickets) in all modes of public transport in Lviv. Another 470,637 trips were paid on electric transport routes via the "Privat 24" mobile application, but there is no data on the distribution by types of transport. Assumption that with "Privat 24" payments (approximately 190 000 in trolleybuses) in total 1,1 mln trips were made in January 2024 on trolleybus routes. Accordingly, it can be expected that passengers will make about 10-11 million trips on trolleybus routes in a year.

Distribution of trips made by passengers by all PT operators (January 2024)	Quantity	Percentage
Communal ATP-1	4 457 674	50,3
Lvivelectrotrans (trams and trolleybuses)	2 615 340	29,5
«Uspikh BM» Ltd.	872 119	9,8
PJSC «ATP-14630»	316 574	3,6
«MIRA i K» Ltd.	308 570	3,5
«Fiakr-Lviv» Ltd.	289 432	3,3
Total	8 859 709	100%

The table does not include data on trips paid by Privat24 application (available in trams and trolleybuses) which amounted — 470,637 trips.

== See also ==
- Trams in Lviv
- Lviv bus

== Images ==
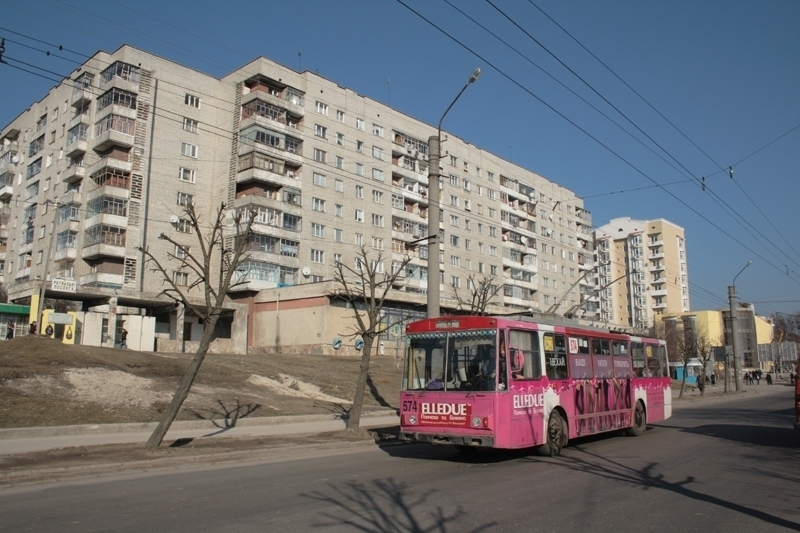
Škoda 14Tr on route 13 (now route 33)

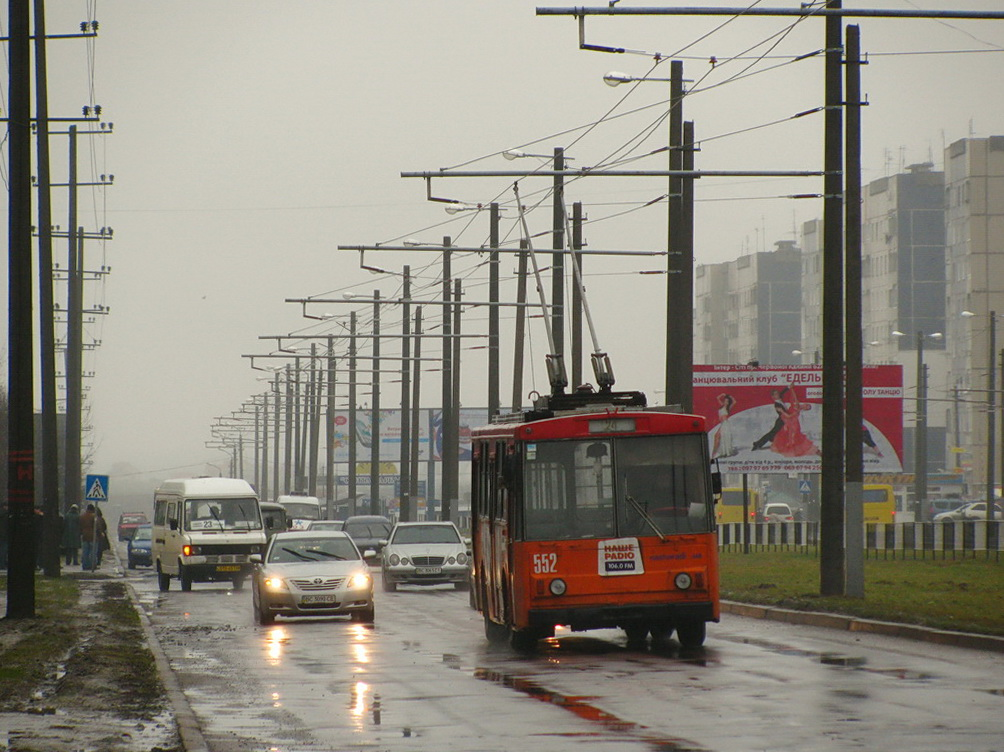
Škoda 14Tr on route 24

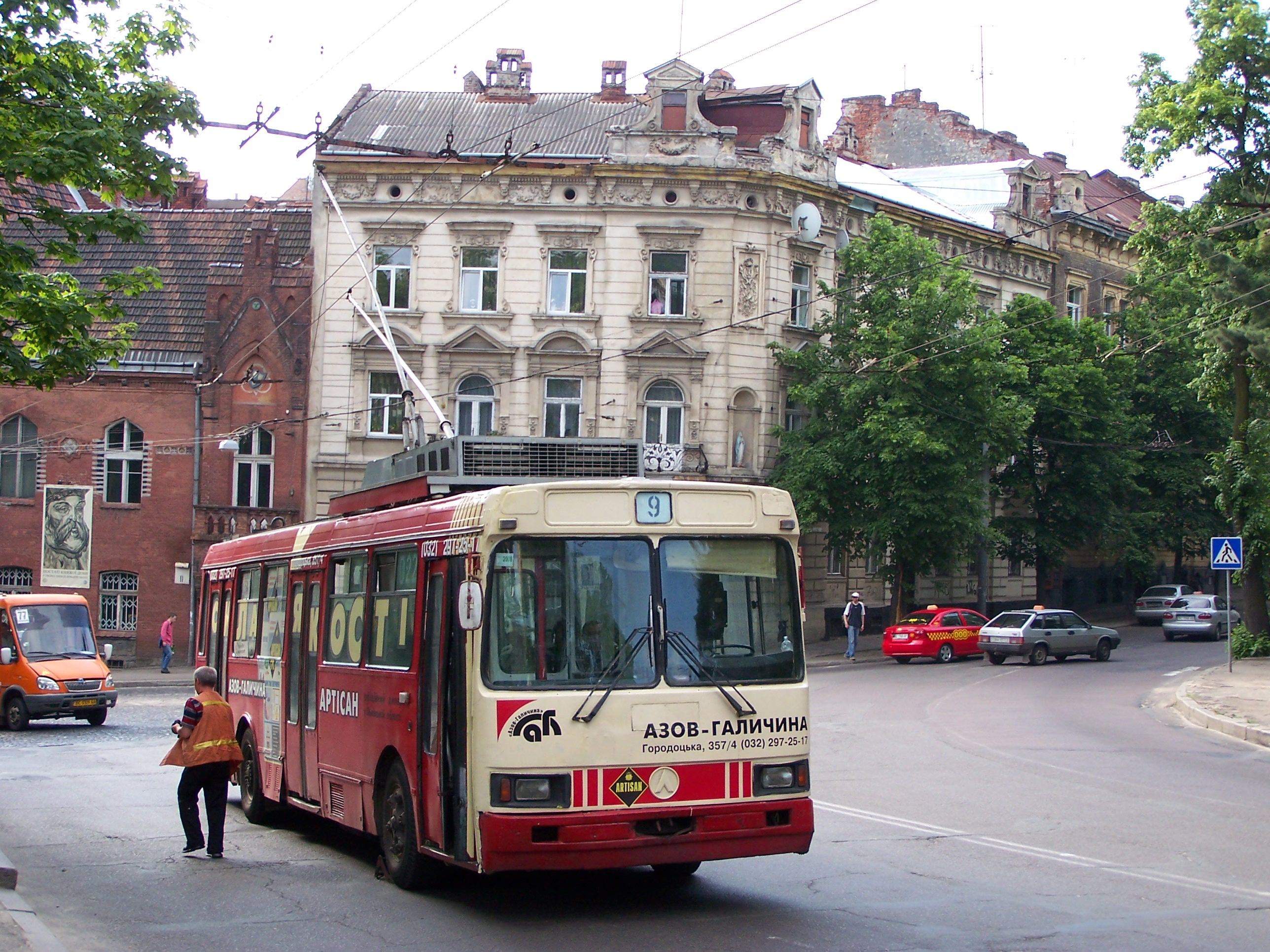
LAZ 52522 on route 9 (now route 29)

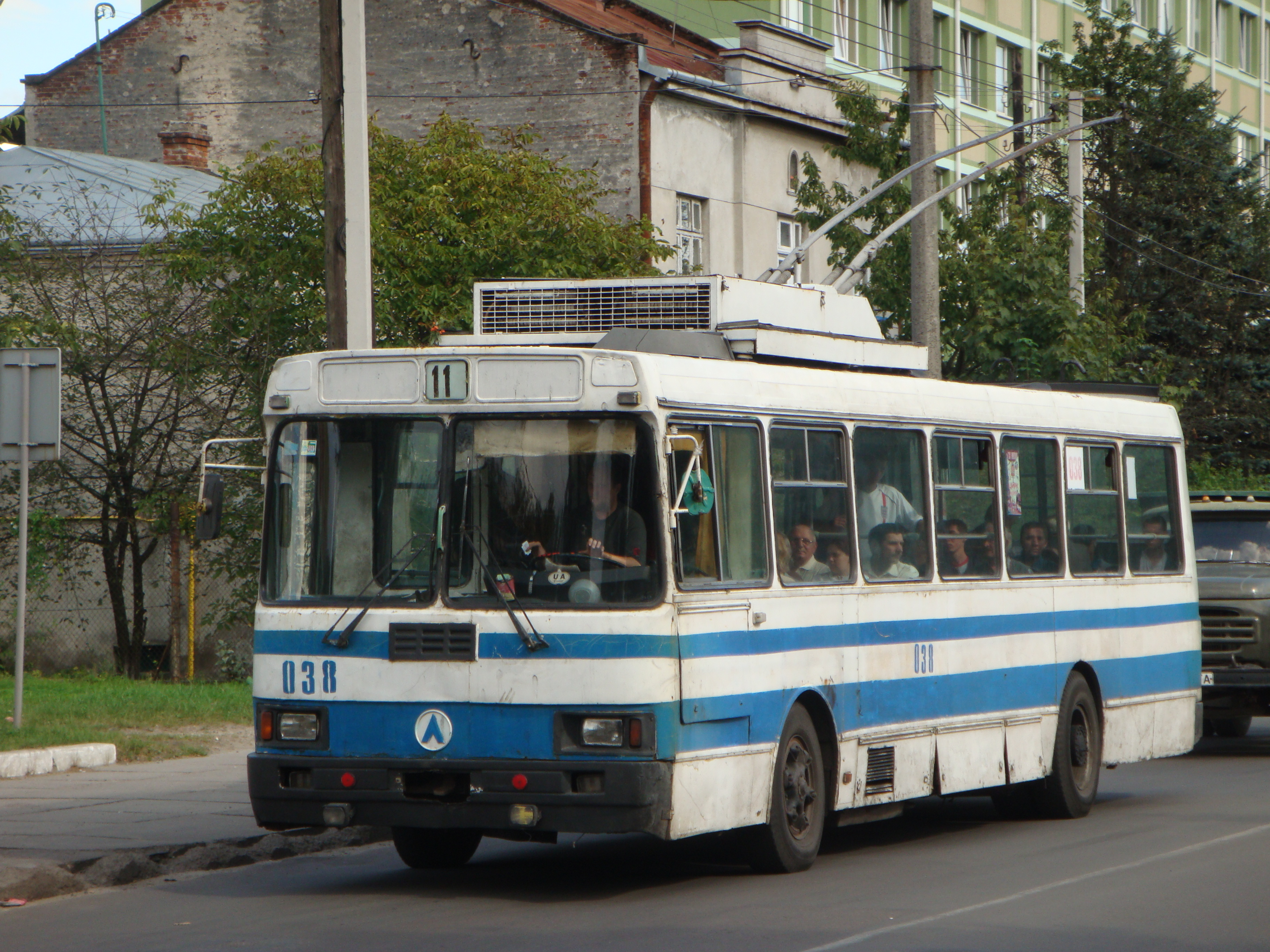
LAZ 52522 on route 11 (now route 31)

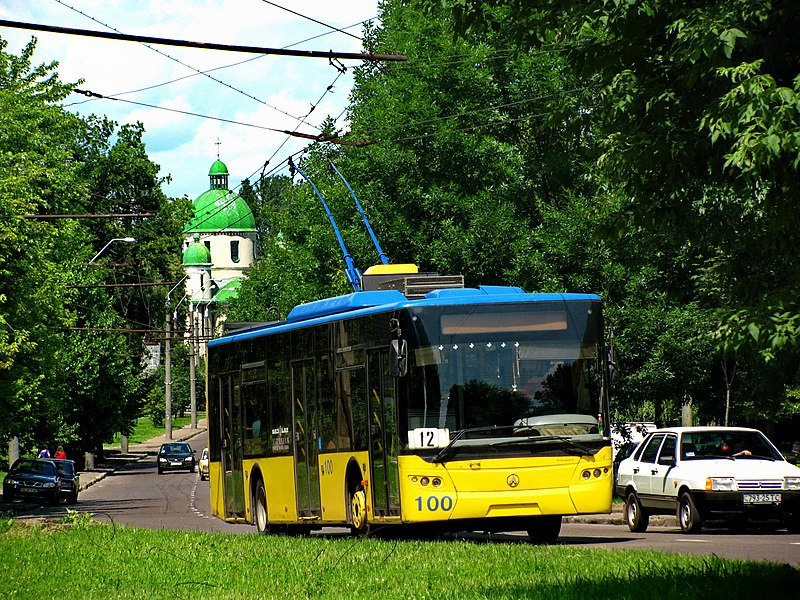
LAZ E183

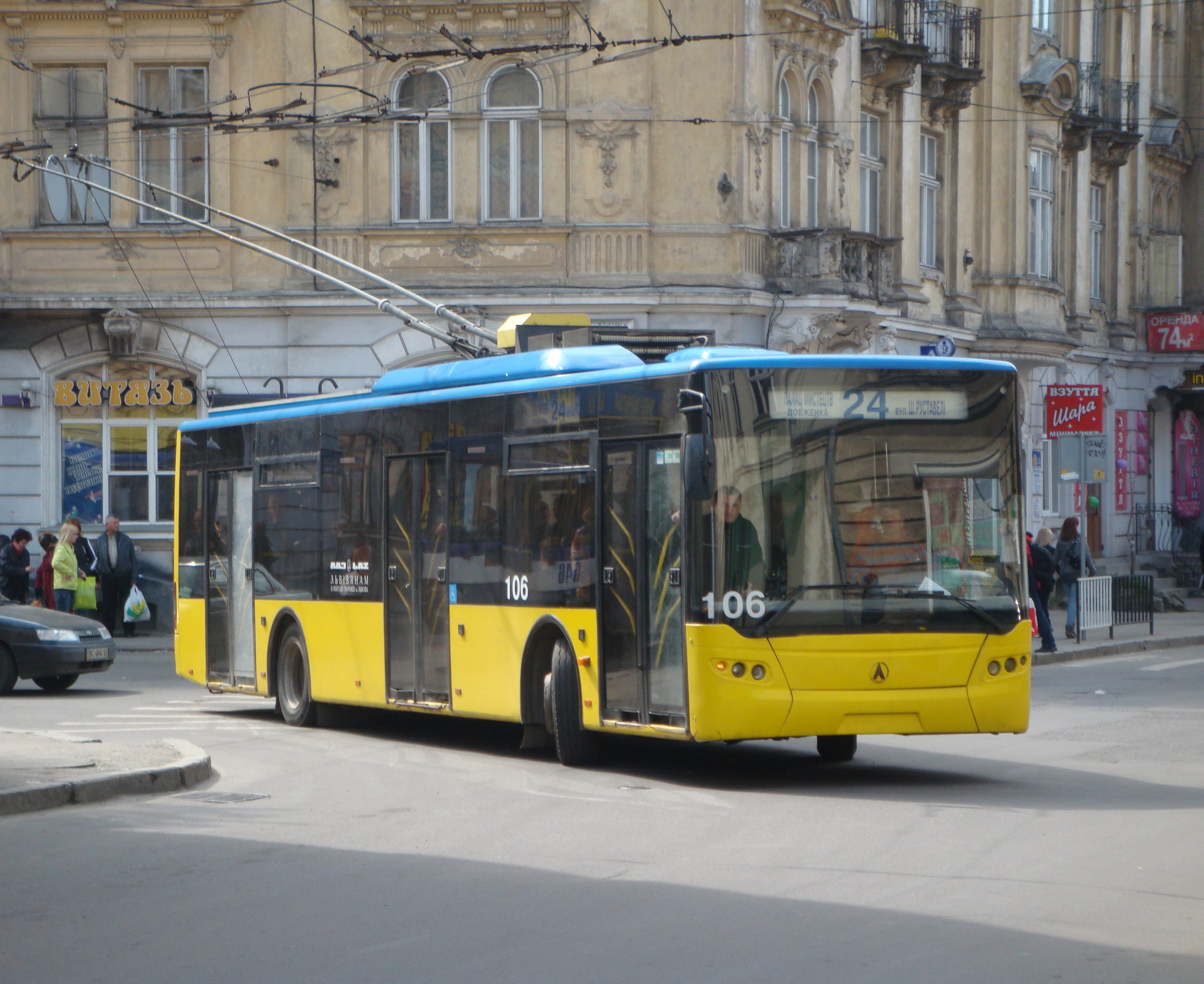
LAZ E183 #106 on route 24

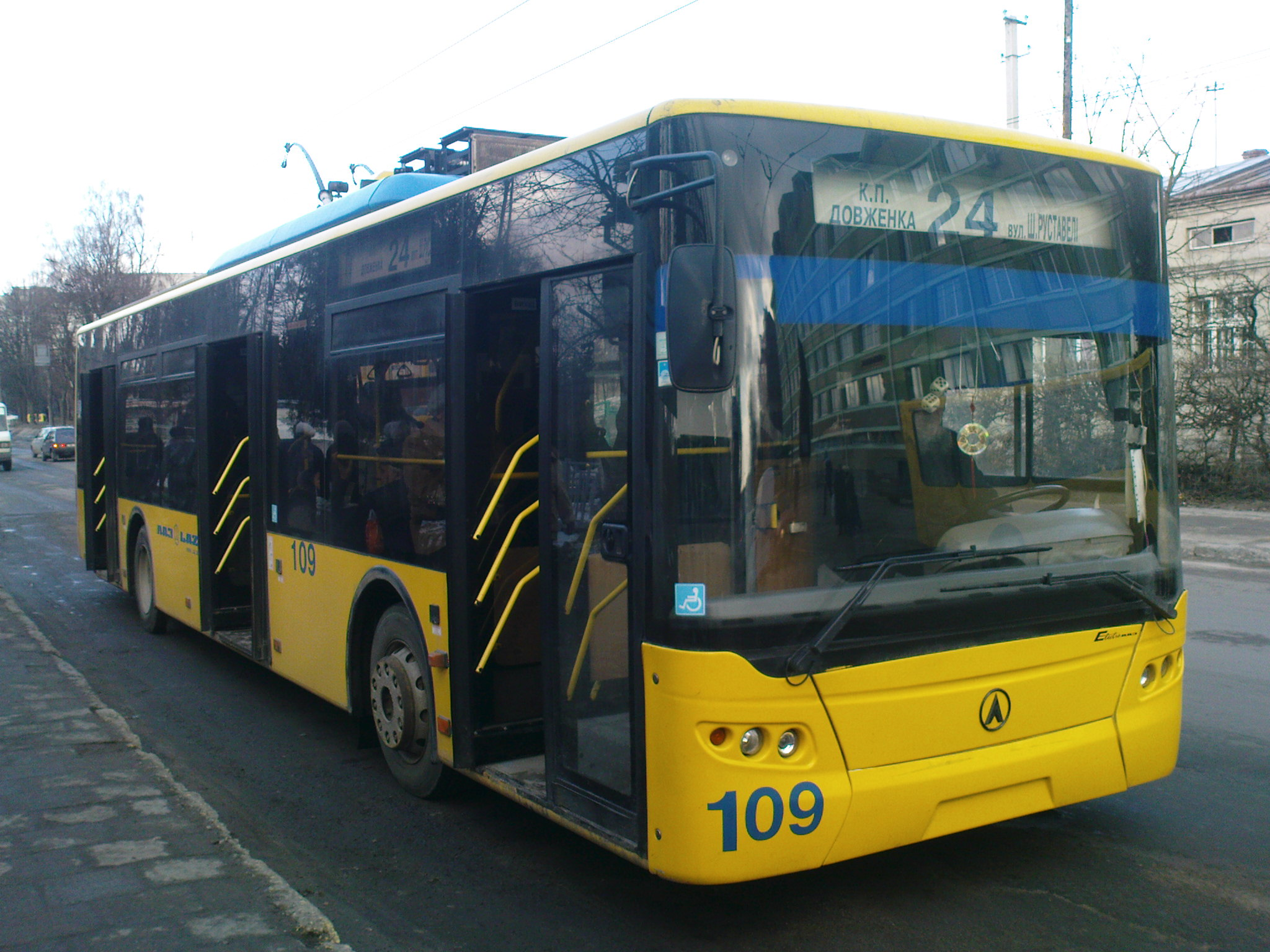
LAZ E183 #109 on route 24

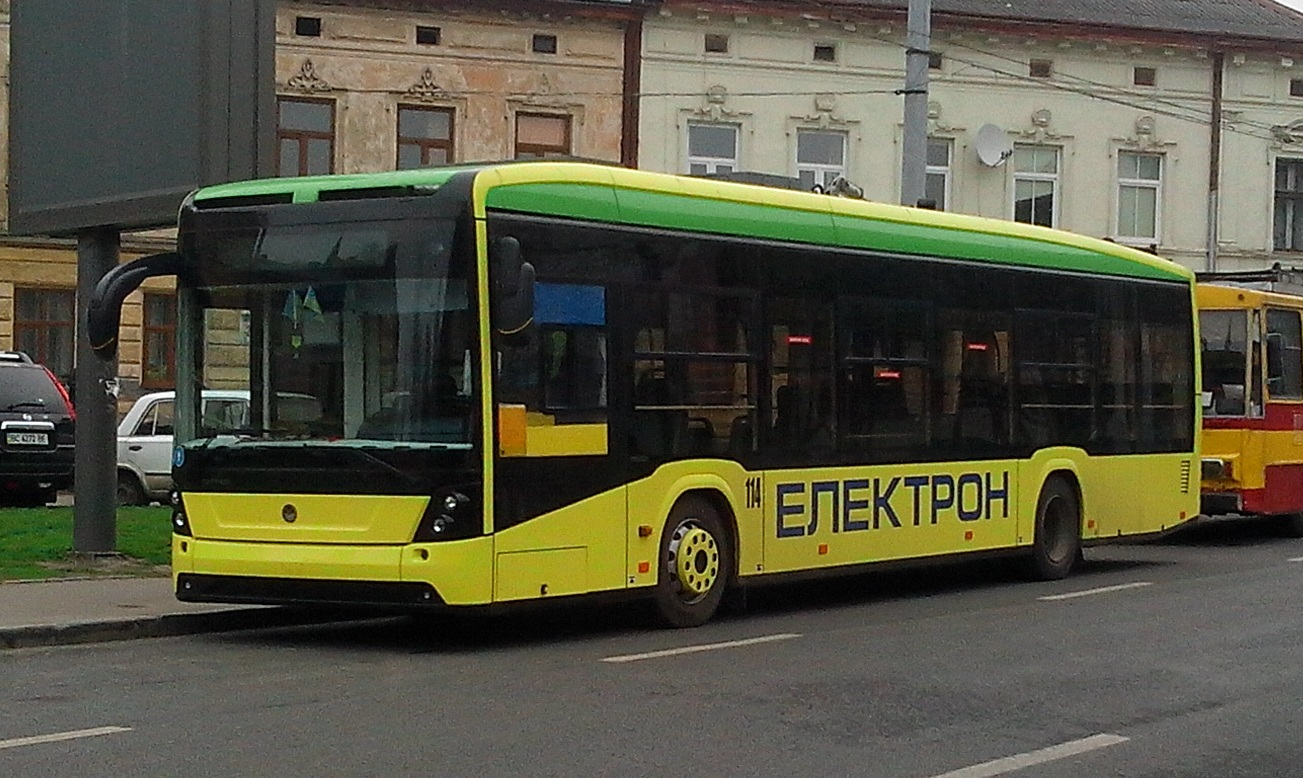
Electron T19101

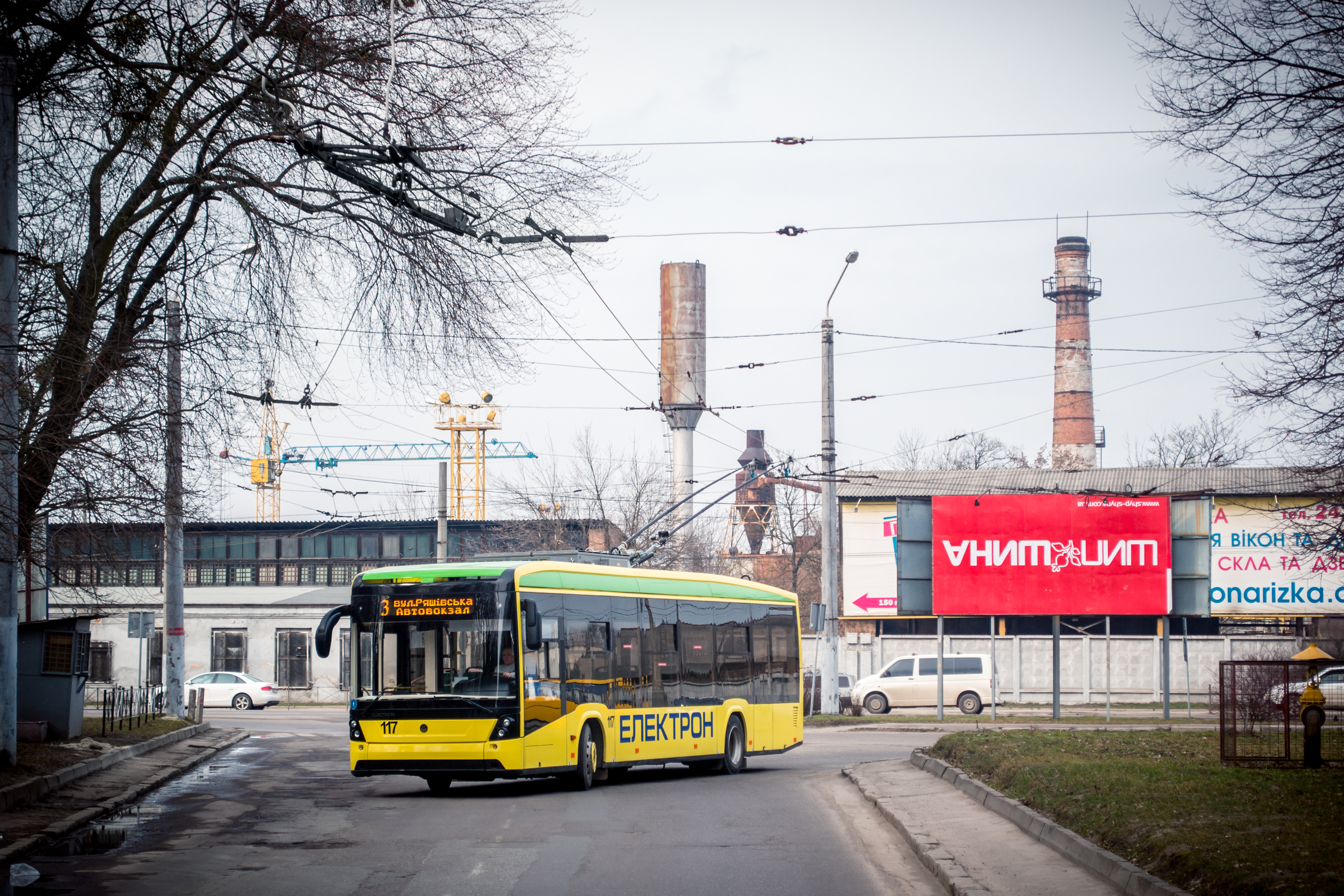
Electron T19102 on route 3 (now route 23)

== Links ==
- Lvivelectrotrans official web-site.
- Interactive map of Lviv public transport routes (lines).
- Communal transport operators of Lviv reported on their work in 2020.
- The city plans to purchase 92 new buses and 60 trolleybuses for hosting UEFA EURO 2012
- Lviv E-Buses - IFC Disclosure.
- Lviv continues to renovate trolleybus network.
- Public transport in Lviv. History and statistics 2022. Transformative Urban Mobility Initiative (2022)
