= Lvivelectrotrans =

Primary provider of municipal transport in Lviv, Ukraine

- Formation: 1901
- Type: Municipal communal enterprise
- Purpose: Transport authority
- Headquarters: 2 Sakharov Street; 79012 Lviv
- Region served: Lviv, Ukraine
- Owner: Territorial hromada of the city of Lviv
- Director: Volodymyr Kovaliv
- Main organ: Trams in Lviv; Lviv trolleybus
- Website: www.let.org.ua/

Lvivelectrotrans (officially "Lvivelectrotrans" Lviv Communal Enterprise; Ukrainian: ЛКП «Львівелектротранс») is the primary provider of municipal transport in Lviv, Ukraine. The company is owned and controlled by the hromada of Lviv and holds a monopoly on the operation of trams and trolleybuses in the city.

As of September 1, 2022, the tram network includes 7 tram routes, with the tracks and contact network measuring 81.85 km (2022) and the route network spanning 99.1 km (2022). In 2021, the trams covered a distance of 3.79 million km for transportation.

The trolleybus network consists of 11 routes, with the contact network measuring 136 km (01.2023) and a route network extending to 169 km (01.2021). In 2021, the trolleybuses completed 3.29 million km of transportation work.

By the end of 2021, a total of 24,678,300 paid passengers, including 2,785,623 students, has used the services of Lvivelectrotrans trams and trolleybuses.

== Description ==
The head office of Lvivelectrotrans is situated on Sakharov Street in Lviv. The organization oversees a tramway, and a trolleybus depot, a car repair workshop, a railroad service, and the contact network's power infrastructure. In March 2010, Lvivelectrotrans was recognized as the third-best electric transport enterprise in Ukraine. Ukraine.

Lvivelectrotrans operates at a loss, because the state authorities only compensate 60% of the cost of transporting privileged categories of passengers. To address this issue, a composting system was introduced in 2008, significantly reducing the enterprise's personnel. All conductors were replaced with a staff of 40 controllers, which is several times smaller. To reduce the number of fare dodgers (known as "rabbits"), a large-scale propaganda campaign is being conducted.

== History ==
In November 2008, a campaign against fare evasion was launched. Its main slogans were Do not be like the killer of Stepan Bandera! and Betrayal of Ukraine begins with an unpaid travel! The campaign was inspired by the story of Bohdan Stashynsky, the assassin of Stepan Bandera, who was recruited by the KGB following his arrest for fare evasion. Postcards detailing this story and featuring the campaign slogans were sent to the home addresses of Lviv's residents.

Between 2009 and 2010, a new campaign titled Lviv — the city of lions, not rabbits was launched to discourage fare evasion. As part of the initiative, tram No.1028 and trolley bus No.574 were given themed exterior designs. The campaign portrayed lions as "courteous passengers who pay for their travel," while rabbits were depicted as fare dodgers.

== Projects ==
Currently, Lvivelectrotrans is implementing several development projects with loans from EBRD and EIB. These projects include the purchase of new modern low-floor trolleybuses (50 units of Electron T19) and trams (10 units of Electron T5L64). In recent years, there have been projects with the EBRD focused on infrastructure reconstruction and rolling stock procurement, including the acquisition of 30 used trams Tatra KT4D from Berlin (BVG).

== See also ==
- Lviv bus
