= Buses in Lviv =

Public transport system in Lviv, Ukraine

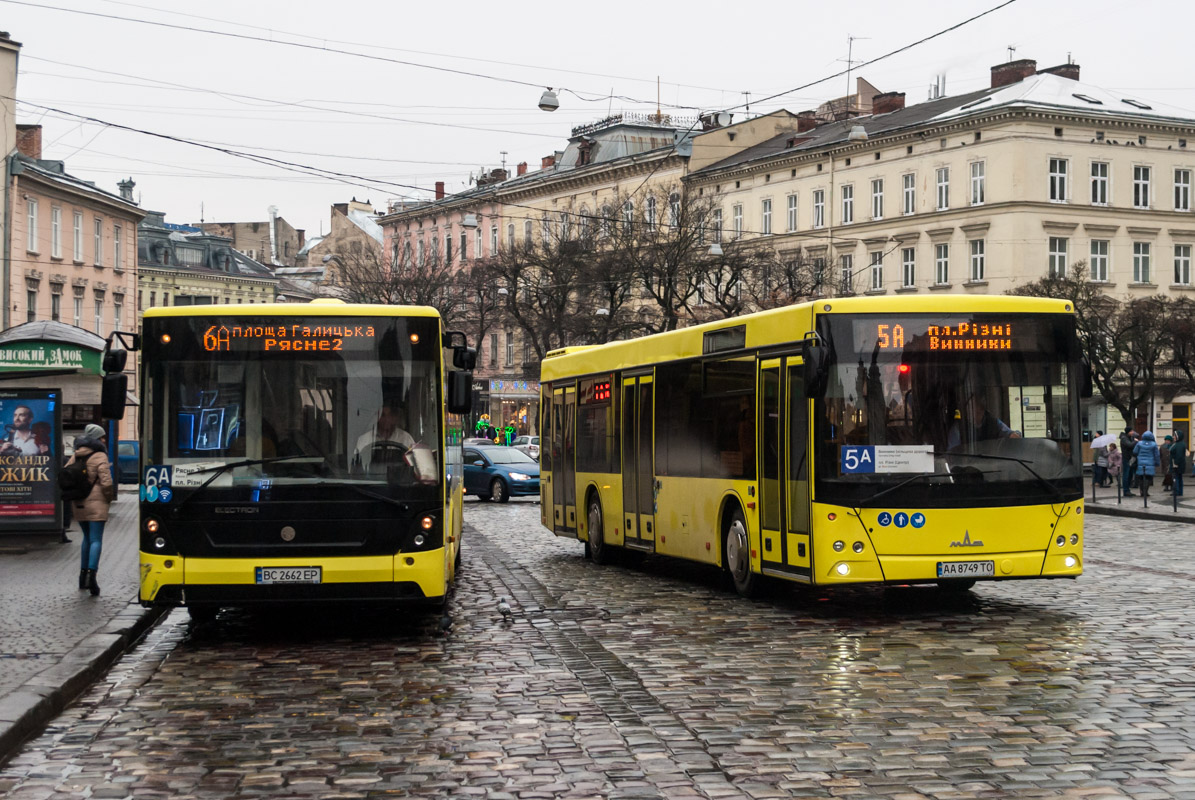
- Electron А18501 & MAZ 203 in Lviv (2018)

Overview
- Area served: Lviv
- Locale: Lviv, Ukraine
- Transit type: Bus
- Number of lines: 49 out of 69 (in operation from 2021)
- Daily ridership: 240,000 (approx.)
- Annual ridership: 89 889 017 (2024; Leocard)

Operation
- Began operation: 1835 – horse-drawn omnibus; 1928 – diesel bus
- Operators: Communal: ATP-1, Private: ATP-14630, Mira i K, Fiakr, Uspikh-BM
- Number of vehicles: ~390 (in operation) out of ~490 passenger

Technical
- System length: 1,600 km (990 mi)

Buses are part of the public transport system of Lviv, serviced by standard (12m) and medium (8m) buses, operating in the "regular" mode, and is the main type of public transport by ridership, number of routes and units of rolling stock. As of 2018, the executive committee of the Lviv City Council (LCC) has approved 54 urban routes (with further addition of 15 new routes during 2019-2023 — 69) that are served by 5 operators identified in the competition in October 2018 (competition repeats each 5 years). Through Lviv also runs several dozen of suburban routes (range # 100–900) approved by the Lviv Regional State Administration (LRSA).

In 2010, bus transport in the city carried 128.9 million passengers, accounting for 63.1% of all ridership in the city according to Regional Office of State Service of Statistics of Ukraine.

According to the data of "Leocard" (e-ticketing system) in January 2024, 6,244,369 passengers or 70.5% of the total number of trips by all types of public transport of the Lviv community (excluding regional LODA routes) were transported by bus routes of the Lviv community.

Annual bus ridership in 2024 was 89 889 017 passengers (of all categories), which is 70% of all trips made by Lviv urban public transport, which means that bus system is prime mode of transportation.

The Office for Transport of Lviv City Council (OT LCC) is the organizer of public transportation in Lviv. Legal regulation of the passenger transportation industry is carried out by the Law of Ukraine On Automobile Transport, Resolution No. 1081 of the Cabinet of Ministers of Ukraine, and other by-laws of Ukraine. The bus system in Ukraine works as self-profitable (no PSO contract or special subsidy) with elements of shadow economy — each day the driver should earn money for the operator and for himself. Officially, in most companies bus drivers works for a minimum wage, and the rest of the salary they "earn" comes directly from fares (passengers cash payments). The city budget compensate a small sum (approx. ₴70 Mio per year) for bus operators only for privileged passengers (such as pensioners), but there was no exact count of such persons traveled till the end of 2023. From 2024 all compensations calculated based on data from "Leocard" (e-ticketing system) validations, as all privileged passengers are obliged to have and validate their's concession personalized "LeoCards" (blue) for all trips made.

The Office for Transport of Lviv City Council organizes competition for bus urban routes each 5 years according to Resolution No. 1081 of the Cabinet of Ministers of Ukraine. The competition procedure is the same for all transportation organizers in Ukraine, it involves the collection of applications in the approved form and the awarding of points (according to the detailed criteria outlined in the government decree) to each participant of the competition. Contestants are usually the same carriers (operators) with the same buses. The competition is not a bidding procedure, as in the case of EU countries, Switzerland or Norway. According to the results of the competition, none of the parties bears any financial obligations. The city council compensates carriers for part of the money for the transportation of privileged passengers and pensioners, but this sum does not cover all the necessary costs for a proper transportation service. As a result, there are constant problems and low quality of bus service.

== History ==
In the first decade after WW1, life in Lviv improved: in the 1920s, there was an increase in the city's population and territory: both the construction of new districts and the joining of neighboring villages to the city, which resulted in a large-scale expansion of the city's borders in 1931. To connect with the new districts, the magistrate decided to introduce a bus service in the city. On April 12, 1928, the first bus route "A" began operating from Sknyliv Airport to Saint Elizabeth church (Kropyvnytskoho sq., since 1992).

As of 2023 the bus network of Lviv (and its settlements) consists of 69 routes which are serviced by 5 operators: 4 private and 1 communal bus enterprise of Lviv City Council. In 2023 only 49 routes out of 69 respectively were in service.

== Rolling stock ==
Lviv communal bus enterprise No. 1 service routes mostly with 190 standard low-floor buses of Electron A185 and MAZ 203 which are 12m long (without AC) and can carry up to 100 passengers. Private operators use approximately 180 medium size buses (locally called "marshrutka") of local producers (on foreign chassis TATA, Isuzu etc.) e.g. Bogdan A092 (Isuzu), Etalon BAZ A079 (TATA) and familiar models. They do not have low floor, AC, and are extremely worn (aged from 10 to 16 years). ATP-1 also hired subcontractors for serving several routes with medium buses (Bogdan A092, Etalon BAZ A079).

Operator	Bus model	Year of manufacturing	Body length, m	Low floor %	Engine standard	Number of vehicles	Note
LCE ATP-1	LAZ A292D1 (CityLAZ-20)	2009–2010	18	100%	Euro 3	5	
LCE ATP-1	LAZ A183D1 (CityLAZ-12)	2009–2011	12	100%	Euro 3	12	
LCE ATP-1	LAZ A191F0	2010	13,5	75%*	Euro 2	13 (15)	2 burned
LCE ATP-1	Electron А185	2015–2019	12	100%	Euro 5	115	
LCE ATP-1	MAZ 203	2018	12	100%	Euro 5	100	
LCE ATP-1	Ataman А092H6	2016	8,5	30%	Euro 5	19 (20)	1 burned
LCE ATP-1	BAZ-А081.10 «Voloshka»	2013	8	0%	Euro 3	18	
LCE ATP-1	used vehicles from EU	1998–2004	11–12	0–100%	Euro 2, 3, 4	33	
LCE ATP-1	Other (unknown) models			0%		15	
Total of ATP-1						288 (320)	
ATP-14630	BAZ A079 Etalon	2004–2006	8	0%			
	Bogdan A092	2006–2008	8	0%	Euro 2		
	Bogdan A22112	2016	6	30%	Euro 5	4	
Mira i K	BAZ A079 Etalon		8	0%			
	Bogdan A092		8	0%	Euro 2		
	Bogdan A22112	2016	6	30%	Euro 5	4	
Fiakr	BAZ A079 Etalon		8	0%			
	Bogdan A092		8	0%	Euro 2		
Uspikh-BM	BAZ A079 Etalon		8	0%			
	Bogdan A092		8	0%	Euro 2		
	Mercedes-Benz O503 Citaro	2006–2009	11	100%	Euro 5	13	Used from Berliner Verkehrsbetriebe
Total for all						~ 490 vehicles	

== Fares ==
From 2 June 2022, the fare has been raised to 15₴ which is approximately US$0,40 or EUR 0,40 as for September 2022. The reason for the increase is due to the shortage and increase in the price of fuel, which was caused by Russian aggression against Ukraine.

In the fall of 2023, LCE "Lvivavtodor" announced that cashless payment of fares in all urban public transport in Lviv will start on December 11, 2023. It will be possible to pay cashless for travel with a bank card, an NFC device and a "LeoCard" transport card. It is also possible to pay in cash to the driver upon receiving a ticket-cheque. From December 11, 2023 all fares in all modes of public transport in Lviv community are equal for all passengers, and concession travels are also available in all lines inside Lviv community.

Sales of general non-personalized "LeoCard" transport cards started on November 15, 2023. LeoCards can be purchased and topped up at "Interpress" kiosks and at "EasyPay" terminals. The cost of the card is UAH 60 + UAH 10 deposit + top-up amount.

Since the introduction of cashless payment in all public transport, the right to discounted travel is granted only if you have a personalized "LeoCard". Controllers will check validation and fine passengers for ticketless/unvalidated rides. Passengers paying in cash must obtain a ticket from the driver and keep it throughout the trip, and "LeoCard" holders must validate the card.

Type of payment	Fare
Leocard (red, adult)	23 UAH
Bank card or NFC device	26 UAH
Cash (ticket from driver)	30 UAH
Student's Leocard	12,5 UAH
Concession Leocard (blue)	0 UAH

== Ridership ==
According to the data of "Leocard" (e-ticketing system) in January 2024, 6,244,369 passengers or 70.5% of the total number of trips by all types of public transport of the Lviv community (excluding regional LODA routes) were transported by bus routes of the Lviv community. In January 2024, passengers made a total of 8,859,270 trips by all types of public transport (which is under the control of the Lviv City Council), of which 29.5% were made by electric transport routes. These data take into account the number of trips made by all passengers, in particular by preferential categories (school children, seniors, handicapped, etc.) and all payment methods (including "Privat 24" app in electric transport) and travel validation. Accordingly, it can be expected that in a year, passengers will make about 74 million trips on bus routes, and about 100 million passengers will use all types of transport (tramway, trolleybus, bus).

Distribution of trips made by passengers by bus operators (January 2024)	Quantity	Percentage
Communal ATP-1	4 457 674	71,4%
«Uspikh BM» Ltd.	872 119	14%
PJSC «ATP-14630»	316 574	5,1%
«MIRA i K» Ltd.	308 570	4,9%
«Fiakr-Lviv» Ltd.	289 432	4,6%
Total	6 244 369	100%

Number of trips made by categories of passengers in all modes of PT (01.2024)	Quantity	Percentage
Paid (Leocard, bank card, single ticket)	4 862 748	54,9%
Concession (seniors, handicapped, etc.; 100% discount)	3 032 854	34,2%
Privat24 app (only in trams and trolleybuses)	470 637	5,3%
School children (100% discount)	362 849	4,1%
Students (50% discount)	130 182	1,5%
Total	8 859 270	100%

According to "Leocard" data provided by "Lvivavtodor", annual bus ridership in 2024 was 89 889 017 passengers (of all categories), which is 70% of all trips made by Lviv urban public transport, which means that bus system is prime mode of transportation.

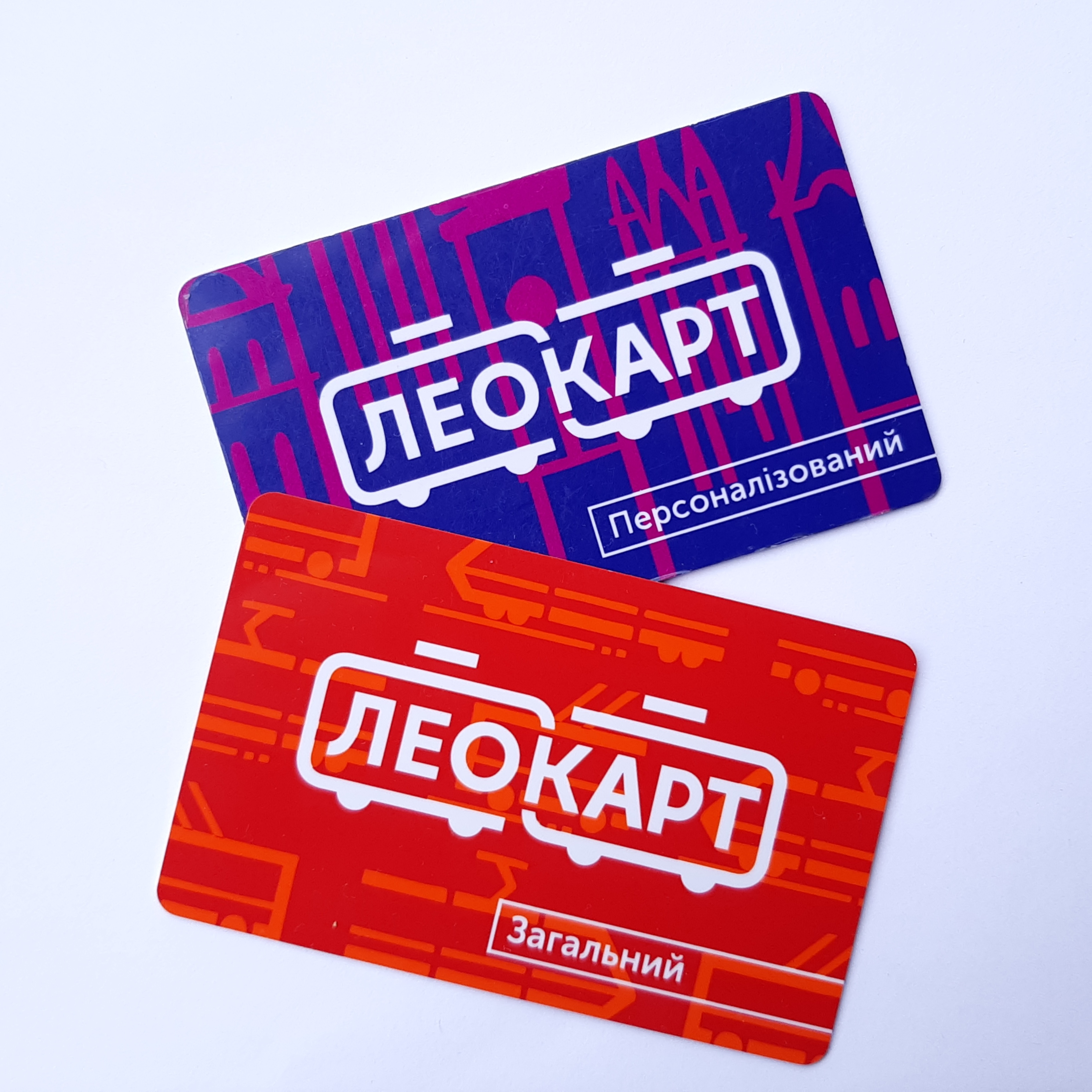
The LeoCard is a contactless smart card used for fare payment on public transportation in Lviv

== Maps and diagrams ==
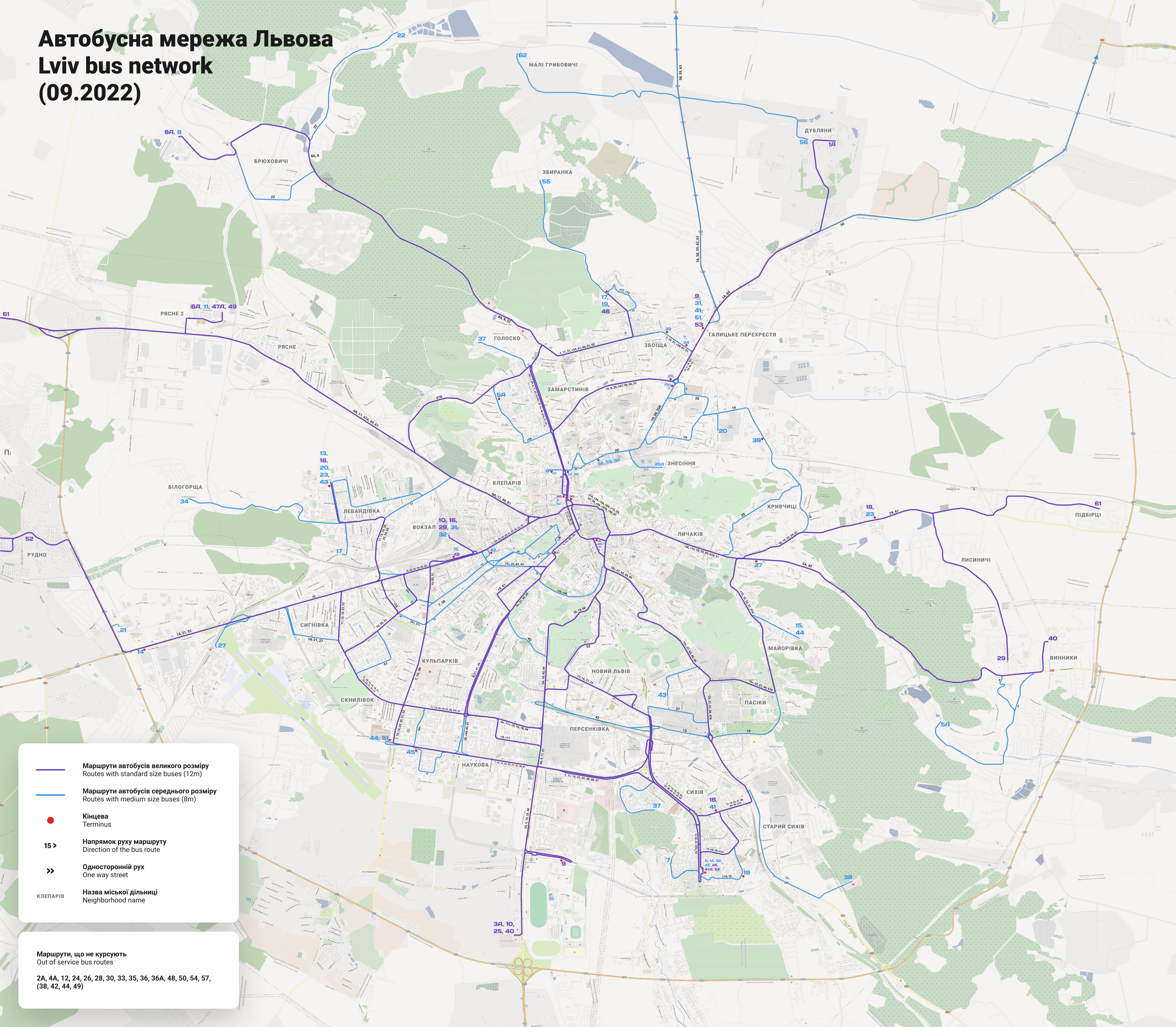
Bus network map of Lviv (09.2022)

Bus network diagram of Lviv (09.2022)

== See also ==
- Trams in Lviv
- Lviv trolleybus

== Lviv Buses Photogallery ==
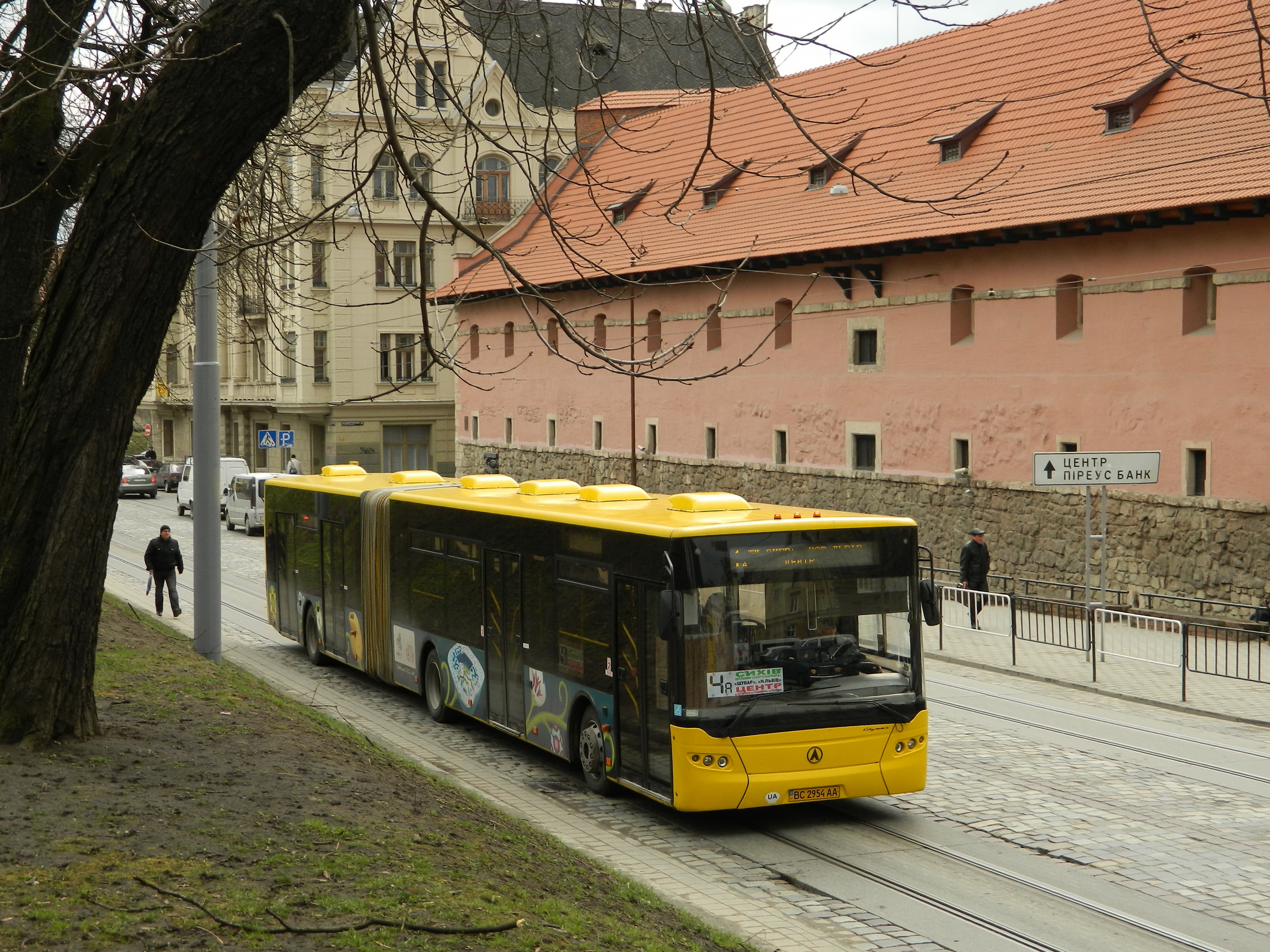
CityLAZ A292 (2009), route #4A (2011)

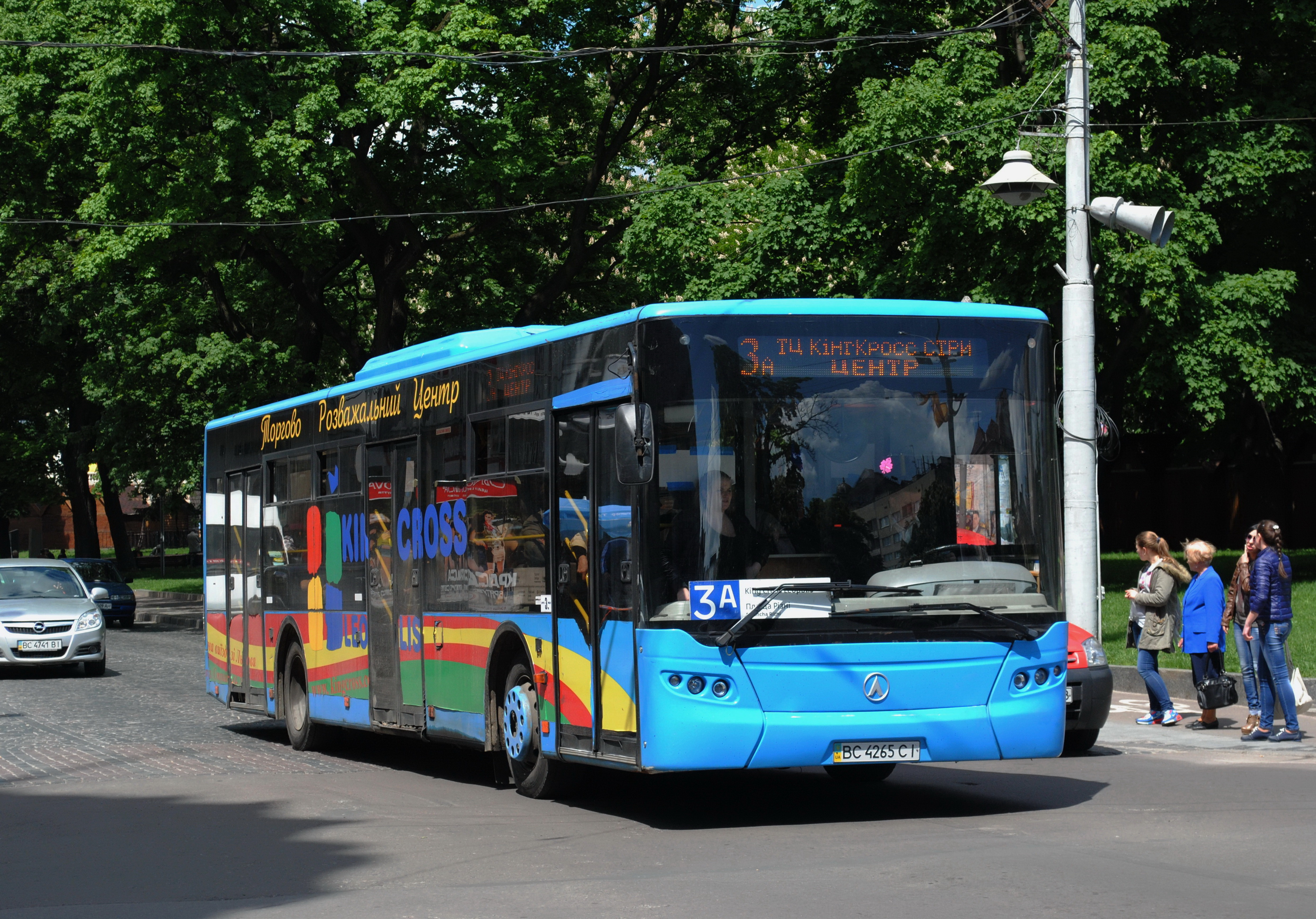
CityLAZ A183, route #3A (2014)

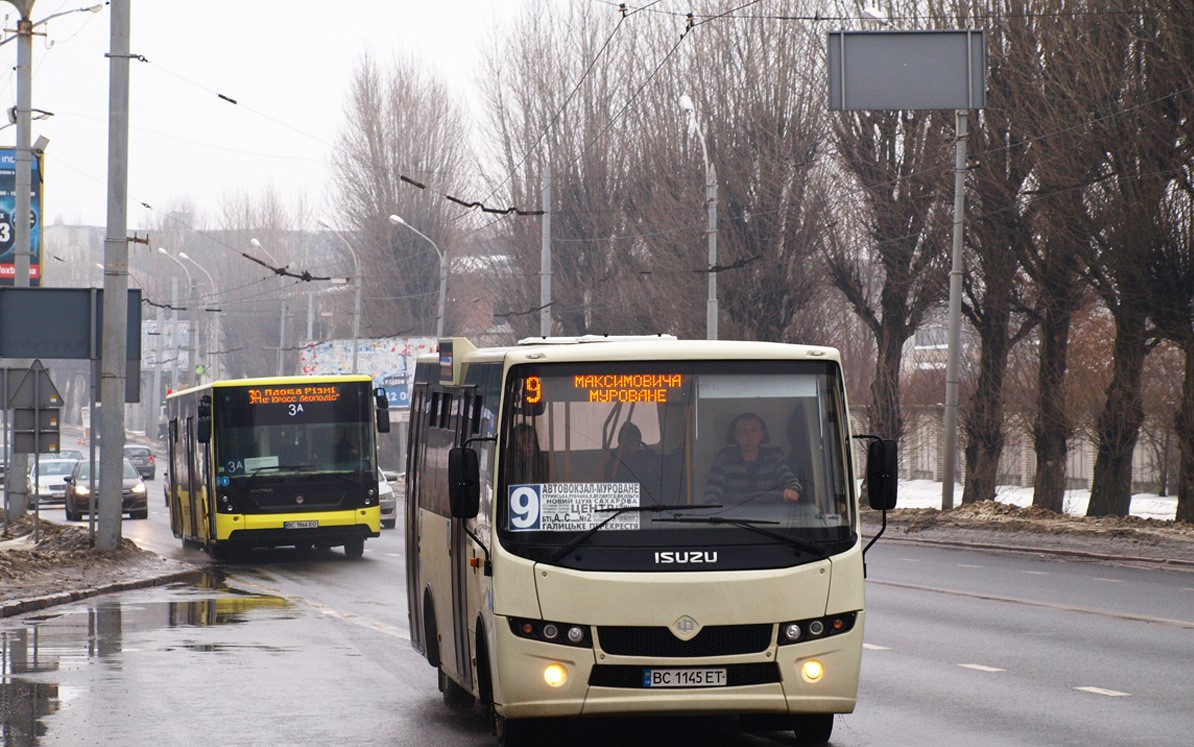
Ataman A092H6, route No. 9 (2017)

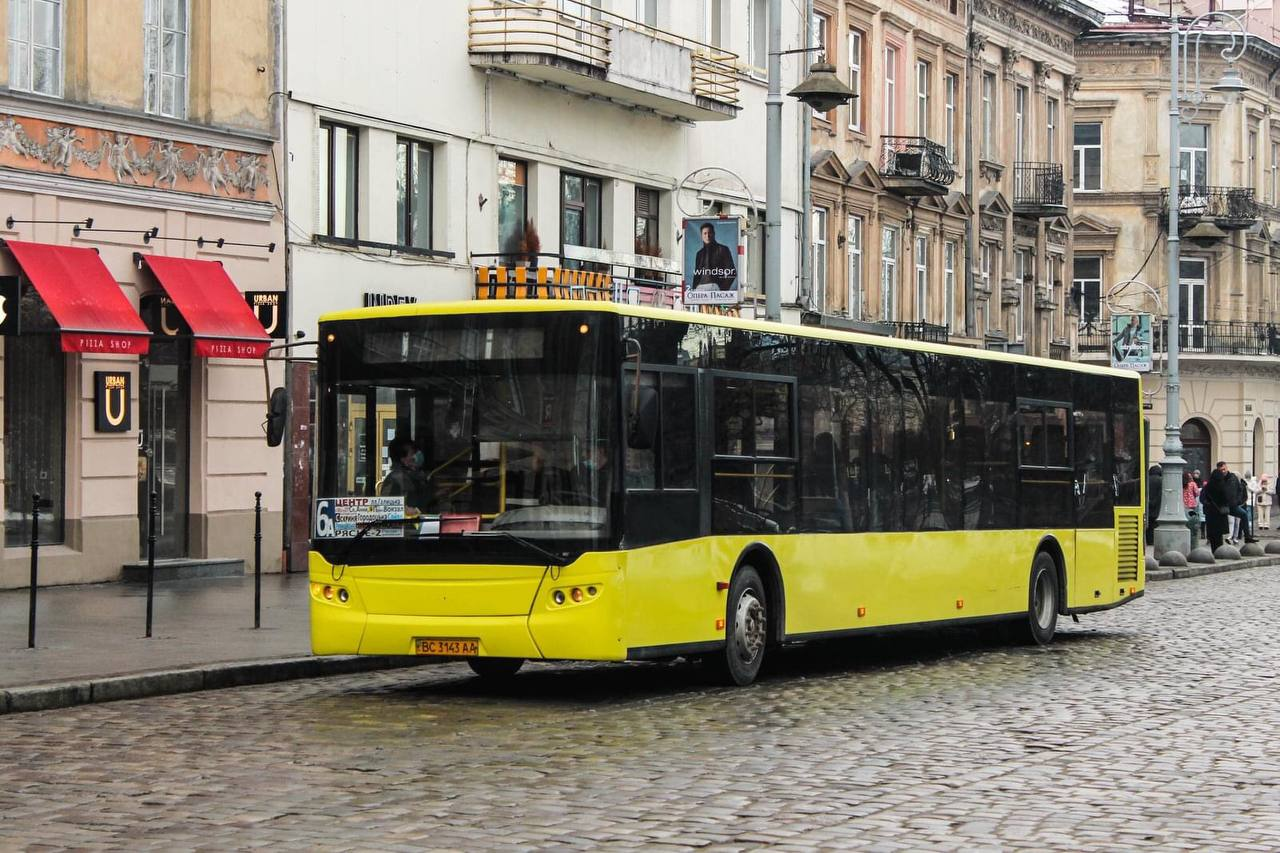
LAZ А191F0, route #6A (2020)

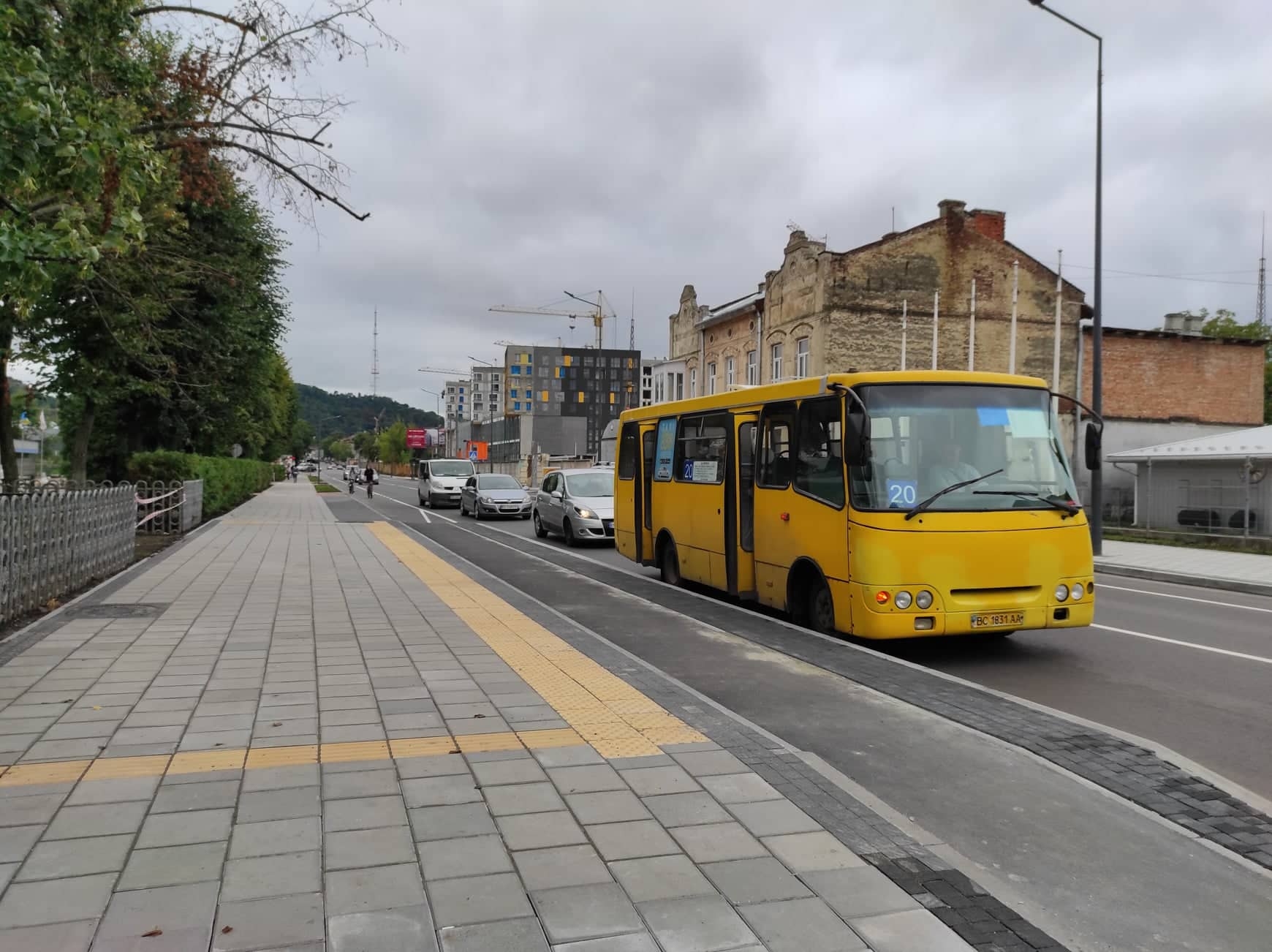
Bogdan A092, route No. 20 (2022)

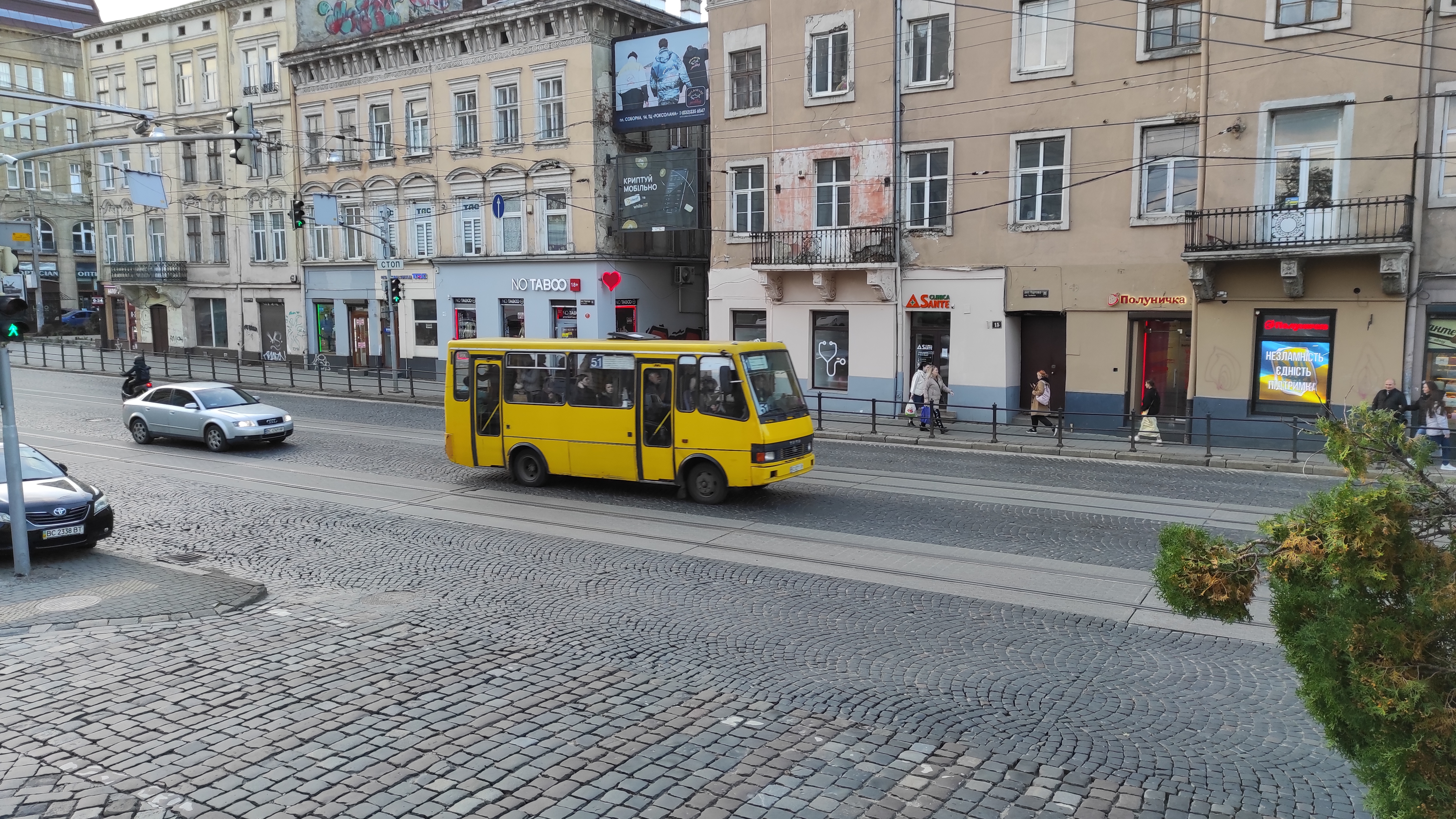
Etalon BAZ A079, route No. 51 (2022)

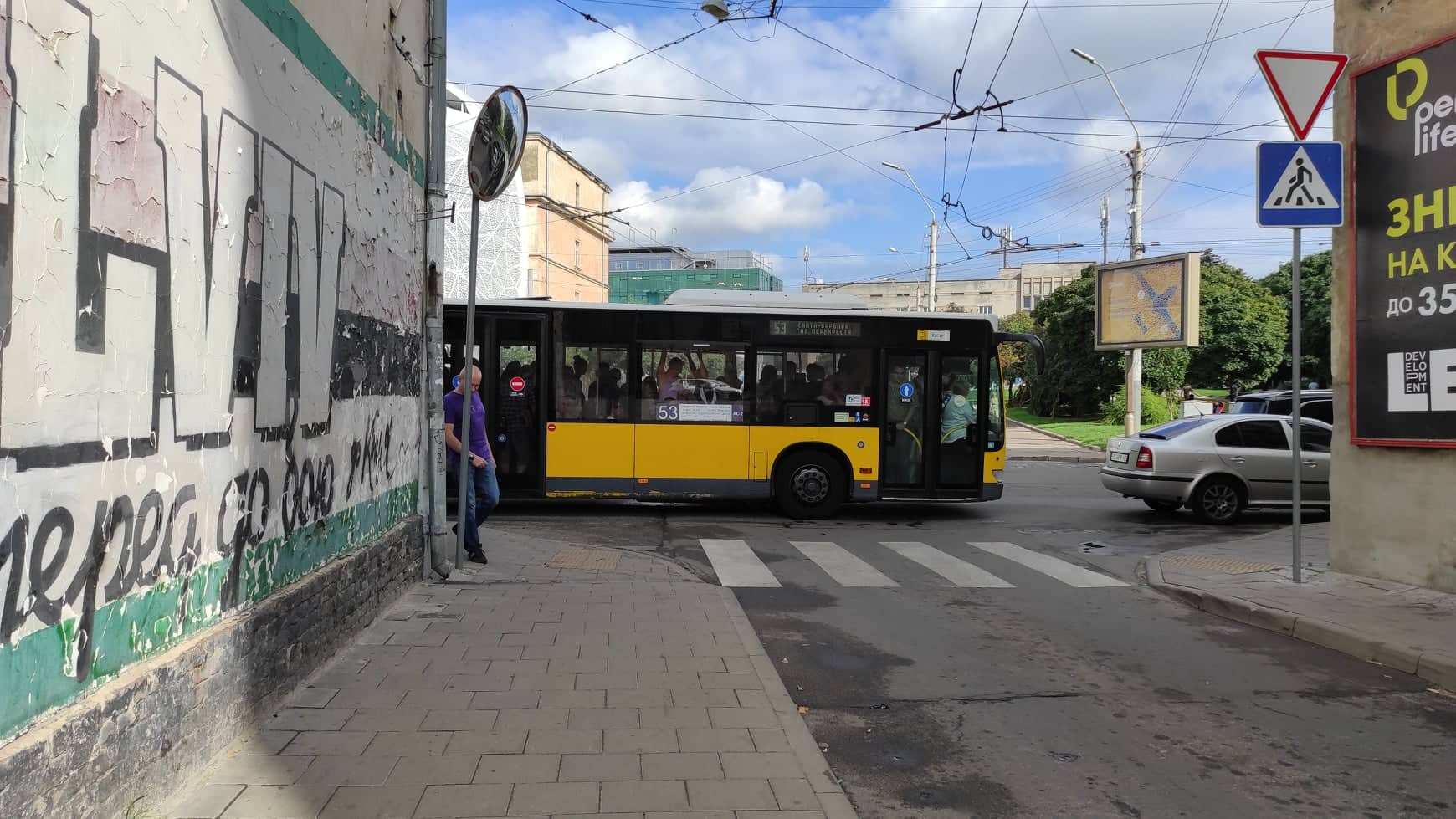
Mercedes-Benz Citaro O503 (2006) from Berlin, route No. 53 (2022)

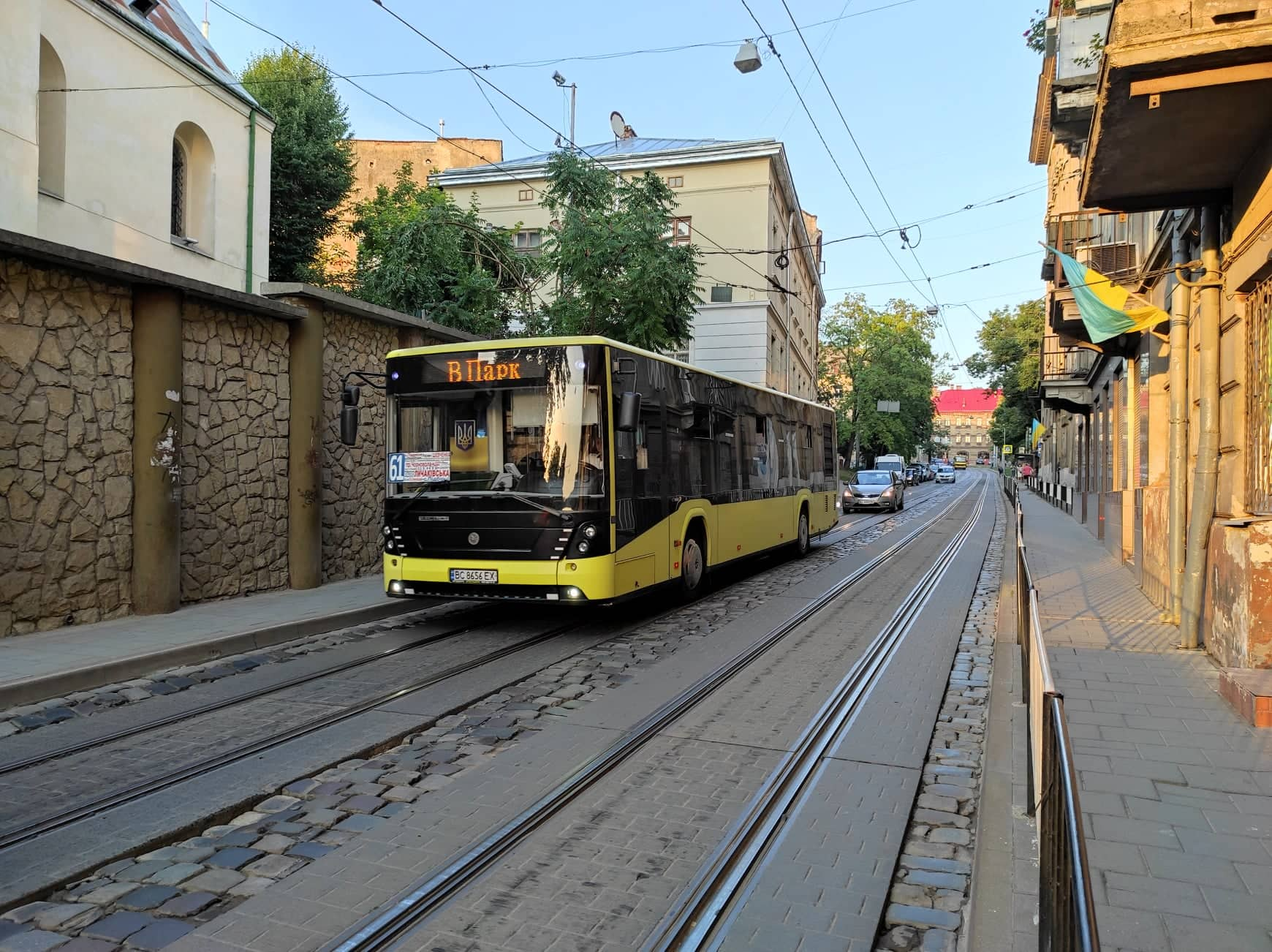
Electron A18501, heading to the depot from route No. 61 (2022)

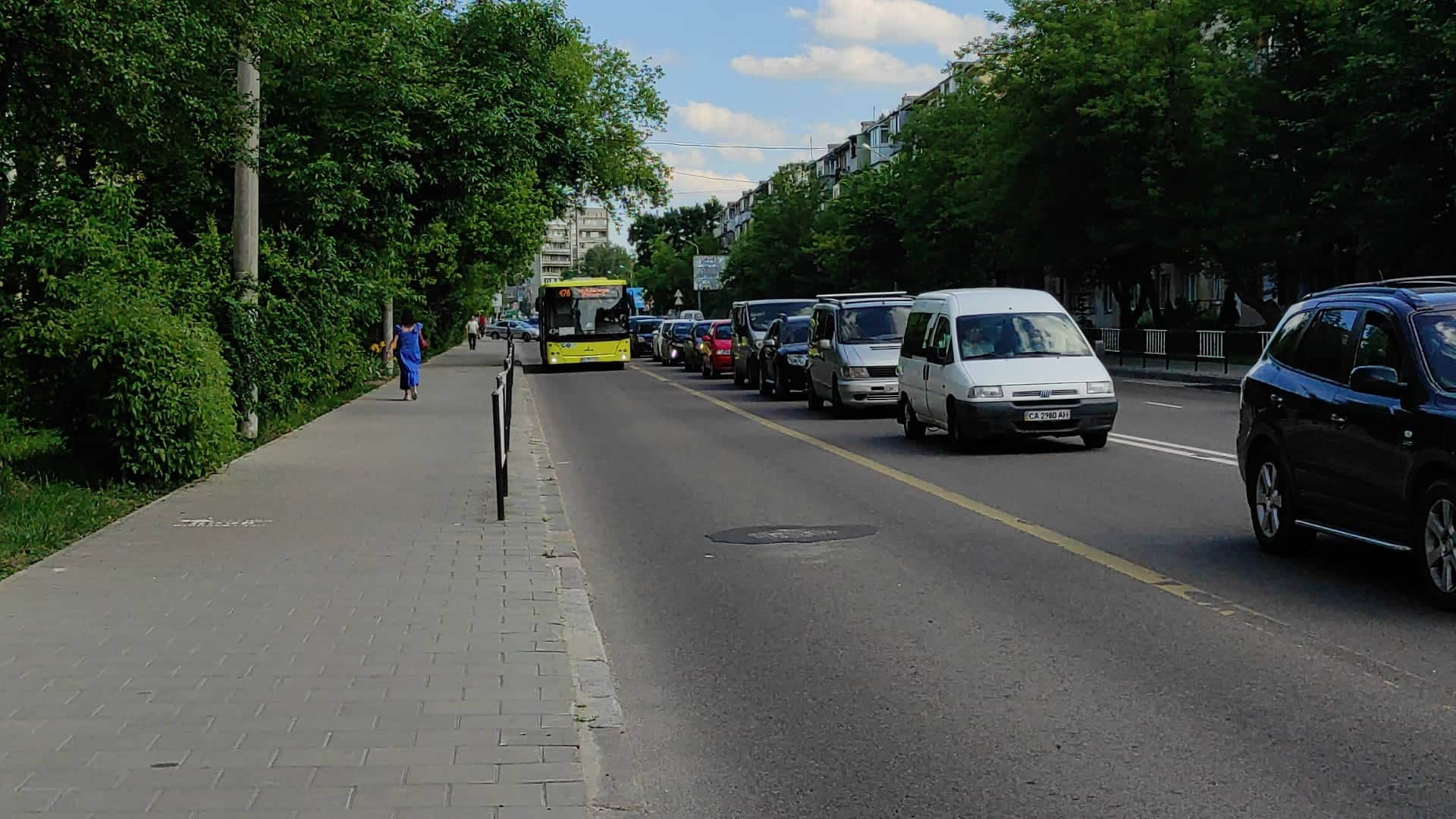
MAZ 203 on a bus lane (2022)

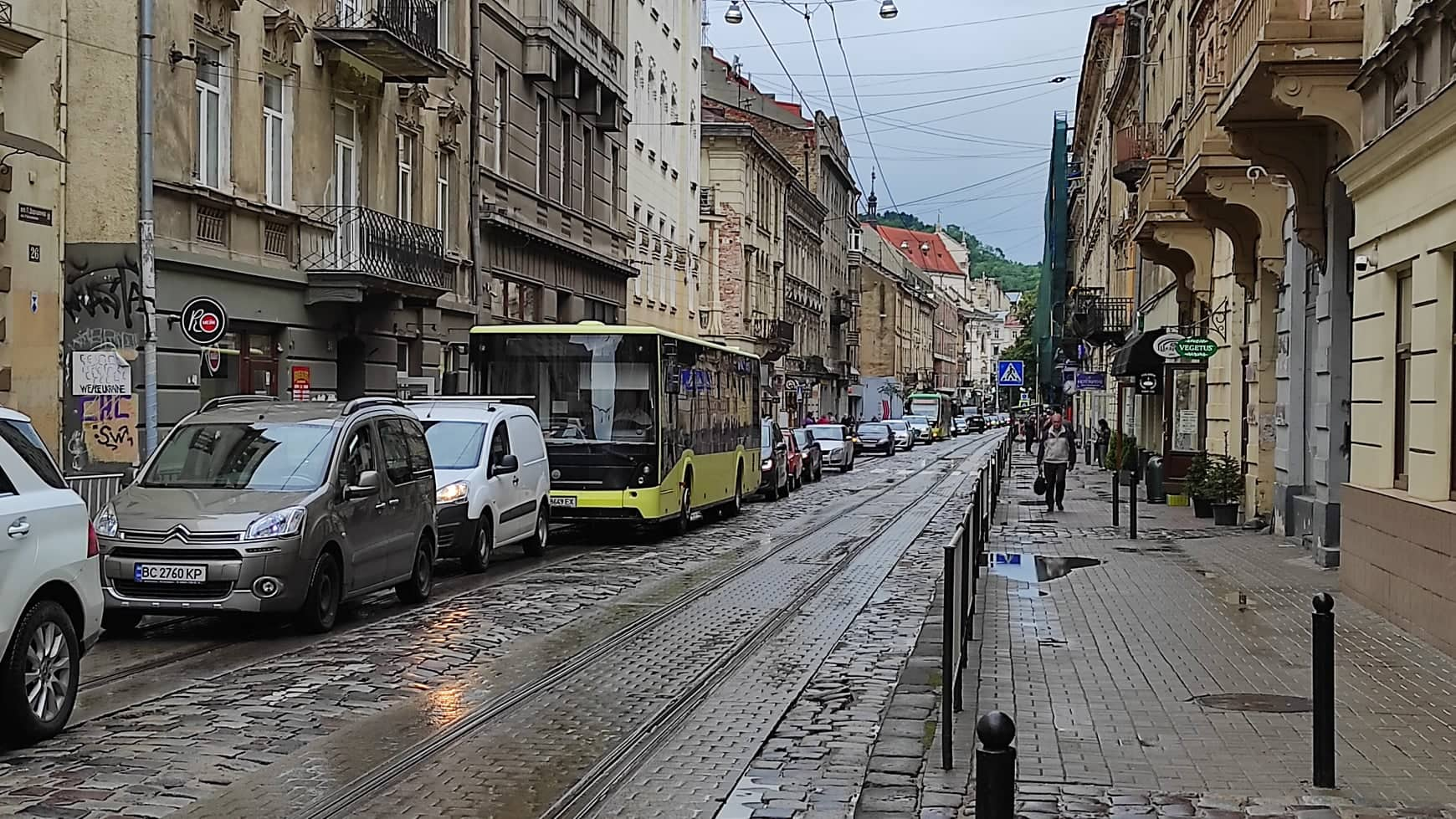
Electron diesel bus in a traffic jam

== Links ==
Eway — Interactive map of Lviv public transport routes

Photo gallery of buses in Lviv

Lviv will announce a Tender for the purchase of 100 city busses

In Lviv, the cost of travel on public transport is significantly higher

HOW INCREASE IN FUEL PRICES IMPACTS THE LVIV TRANSPORT (2022)

Mobility in Lviv – Buses. Transformative Urban Mobility Initiative (2022)

Public transport in Lviv. History and statistics 2022. Transformative Urban Mobility Initiative (2022)
