= Lviv bus station =

On Stryiska St in southern Lviv, Ukraine

Lviv bus station Автовокзал «Львів»
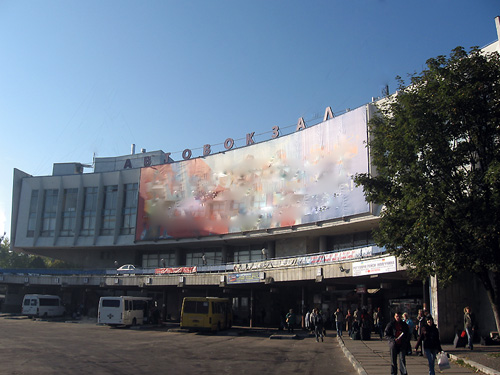
- The exterior of the station in 2007

General information
- Location: 109 Stryiska Street, Lviv; Lviv Oblast; Ukraine
- Coordinates: 49.7867°N 24.0164°E

History
- Opened: 1980 (46 years ago)
Location

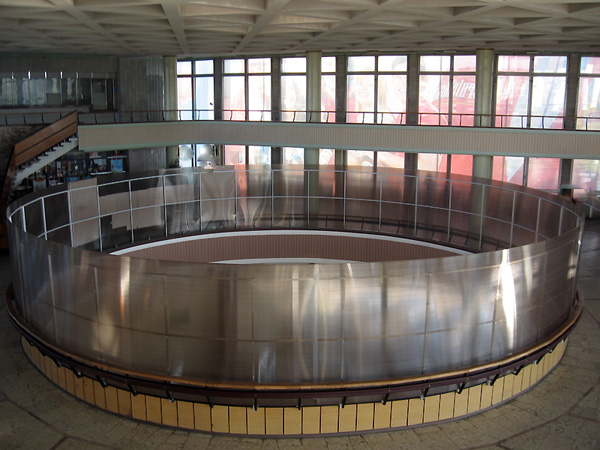
Upper floor inside the building

Lviv bus station (Ukrainian: Автовокзал «Львів», romanized: Avtovokzal "Lviv"; also known as Stryiska bus station) is the main bus station of Lviv, in western Ukraine. The station is located on Stryiska Street in the neighbourhood of Bodnarivka about 6 km (4 mi) south of the main train station. The building is modernist in nature, and has a triangular floor plan.

The state decided to construct a new bus station for Lviv in 1969. Planning began in 1971, and construction in 1976. The station was opened in 1980.

== Building ==
The station was to be built near the southern entrance to the city. The chosen plot had been previously populated with private houses; the residents were moved and the residences removed.

According to preliminary estimates, the building would cost 1,200,000 SUR and the rest of the complex an additional 550,000 SUR. (Note: Prices are in 1973 rubles.) The station was to have a capacity of 500 passengers and the ability to handle up to 15,000 passengers daily.

The triangular floor plan split the building into three zones. One side was to serve as the main façade facing Stryiska Street, a second as the arrival zone, and the third as the departure zone. Currently, the arrival zone also serves as a departure zone, and the zone previously intended for departures is used for parking instead.

== See also ==
- Lviv Bus Factory
- Kyiv Central Bus Station
