= Electron T19 =

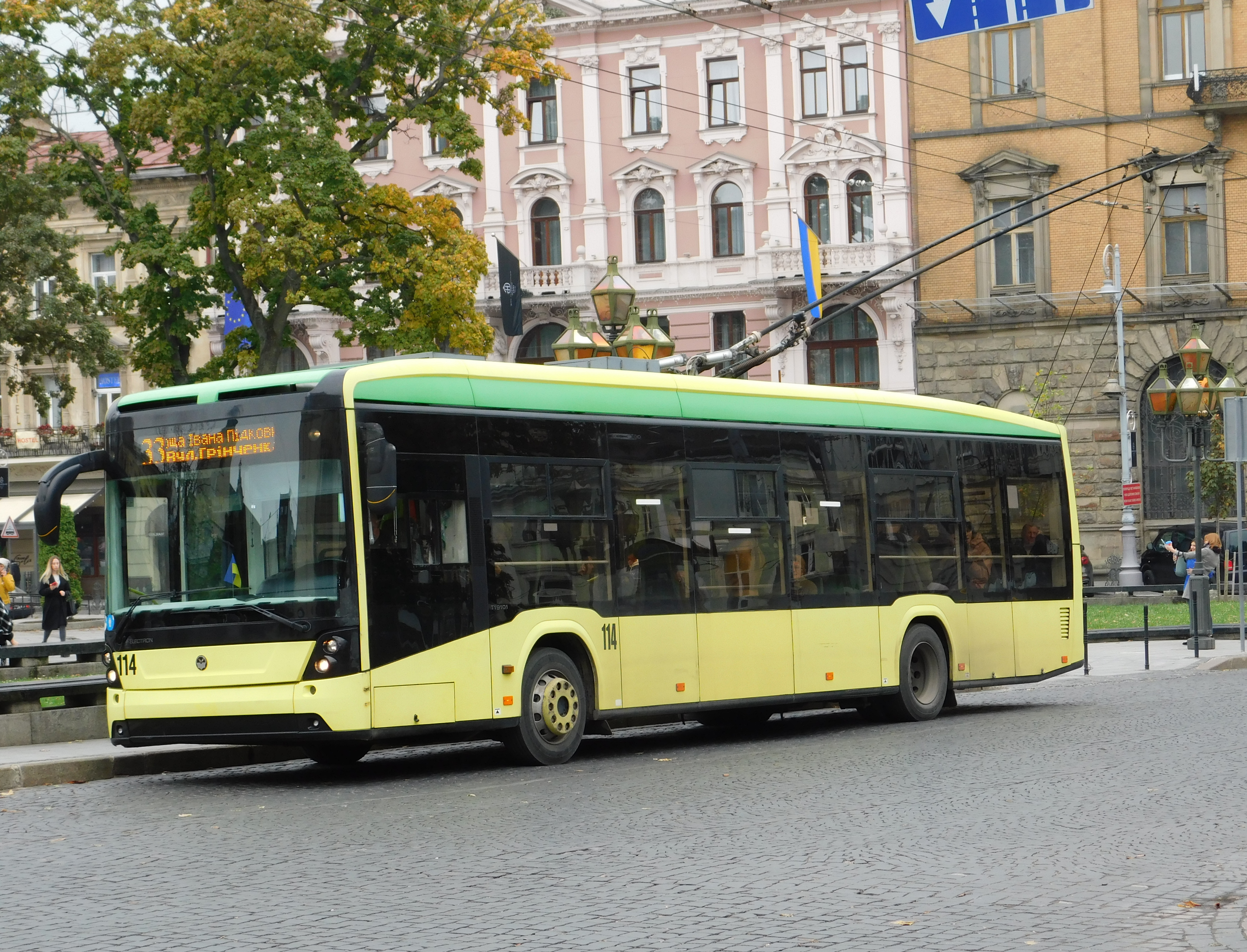
- Electron T19 in Lviv, Ukraine

Overview
- Manufacturer: Electron
- Production: 2014–present
- Assembly: Lviv, Ukraine (Electrontrans)

Body and chassis
- Class: trolleybus
- Doors: 2 or 3
- Floor type: Low entry
- Chassis: semi-self-supporting with frame
- Related: Electron A18; LAZ E183; Bogdan T701

Powertrain
- Engine: AD-903U1; DTA-2U1
- Power output: 180 kW (241 hp)

Dimensions
- Length: 12,000 mm (472.4 in)
- Width: 2,550 mm (100.4 in)
- Height: 3,670 mm (144.5 in)
- Curb weight: 11,400 kg (25,100 lb)

The Electron T19 is a Ukrainian low-entry trolleybus, mass-produced since 2014. The model is commonly used in many cities of Ukraine.

== Description ==
=== Cabin ===
The body of the trolleybus is a one-welded low-floor wagon type. It is made of ordinary steel with a surface or stainless steel. External cladding is made of aluminum-plastic Dibond composite and a front and rear fiberglass mask, which allows you to reliably protect the trolleybus from corrosion. Internal cladding is made of plastic. There are 34 seats in the cabin.

=== Electrical ===
An asynchronous motor is used as a traction motor. It is controlled by a frequency converter with a vector method. The control system provides a braking mode for the recovery of electricity into the contact network, in which, according to the manufacturer, the energy savings are up to 40%, compared to trolleybuses with self-sufficient control. The maximum speed of the trolleybus is limited to electronics at the level of 65 km/h.

Traffic safety is monitored by electronic control and control systems, the ABS system, as well as external and internal video surveillance cameras. The trolleybus has an on-board computer that constantly checks the condition of the trolleybus through the Controller Area Network.

=== Heating, ventilation, and air conditioning ===
The cabin is heated by air heaters. External view mirrors have electric heaters. Natural ventilation comes through the windows and hatches in the ceiling, if any. Depending on the configuration, the cabin and driver's cabin are equipped with air conditioning.

=== Devices for persons with disabilities ===
The body of the trolleybus is made low-floor, that is, it does not have stairs in the door, and for the additional convenience of boarding and disembarking passengers, kneeling is used, thanks to which the trolleybus at the stop descends from the side of the door, reducing the ground clearance. In the middle door there is an openable ramp for the arrival of a wheelchair in a specially adapted place with safety belts for fixation while driving. The trolleybus cabin as well as the middle doors are externally equipped with signal buttons.

== History ==
Trolleybus Electron T19 was developed in 2013 by the designers of the Electrontrans plant, who were invited from the LAZ plant, which at that time was no longer actually working. Therefore, the new trolleybus received body and other elements similar to the LAZ E183 trolleybus.

The first Electron T19101 trolleybus was manufactured for the city of Lviv and transferred to LVKP "Lvivelectrotrans" at the end of September 2014. After the completion of the full cycle of tests on October 25, 2014, in Lviv, the trolleybus Electron T19 began regular transportation of passengers.

On December 22, 2014, Electron T19 was delivered to Khmelnytskyi. In total, the city purchased two such trolleybuses for ₴4,452,000.

During 2015–2016, Lviv continued to buy trolleybuses of this model. During the delivery, technical flaws were identified that became public: the manufacturer delivered a trolleybus with a faulty traction engine.

At the beginning of 2019, LVKP "Lvivelectrotrans" purchased 50 new trolleybuses on credit at the expense of the EBRD. As a result of the EBRD tender, the winner was LLC "Joint Ukrainian-German Enterprise "Electrontrans" and PJSC "Concern-Electron". The city received the first 10 trolleybuses in six months.

On November 4, 2019, Electrontrans presented the first batch of 10 cars.

On November 29, 2019, when LVKP "Lvivelectrotrans" received the first 10 cars, it turned out that the trolleybuses had 22 technical drawbacks and comments on the part of the customer. The terms of signing the acts of acceptance and transfer of trolleybuses were slightly shifted from the previously approved schedule. Accordingly, new trolleybuses entered the routes on December 15. [8] All subsequent batches of vehicles supplied by the manufacturer also failed with discovered remarks and flaws.

On September 21, 2020, LVKP "Lvivelectrotrans" received all 50 "Electron" trolleybuses. However, with significant delays in delivery schedules, the price of one car was 213 thousand Euros.

== Modifications ==
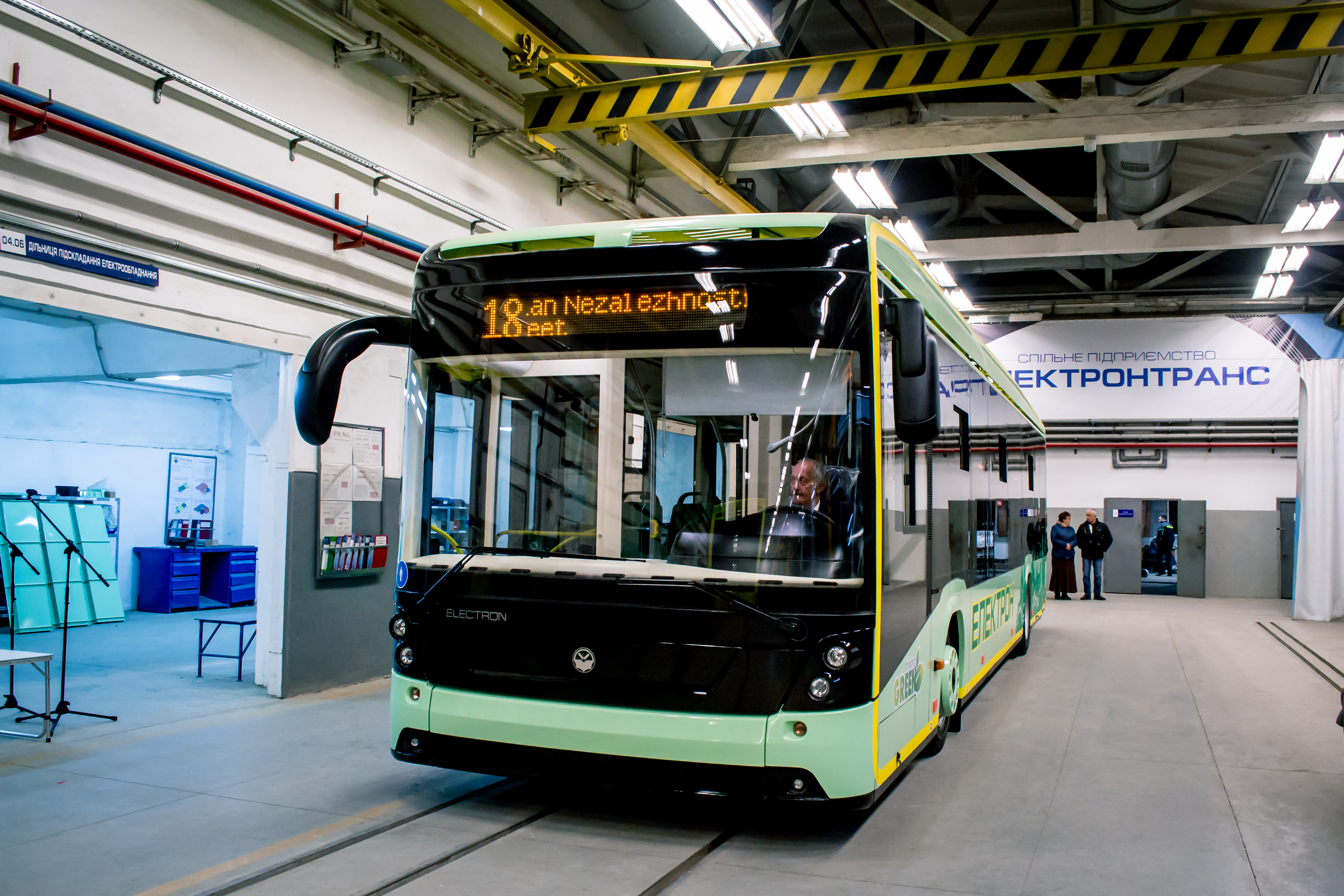
T19101

- Electron T19101 — 12-meter trolleybus with asynchronous engine DTA-2U1 manufactured by "PEMZ" (Pskov, Russia) and traction converter PTAD-202M-180-129 of the company "Cherhos"." It was produced from 2014 to 2016.

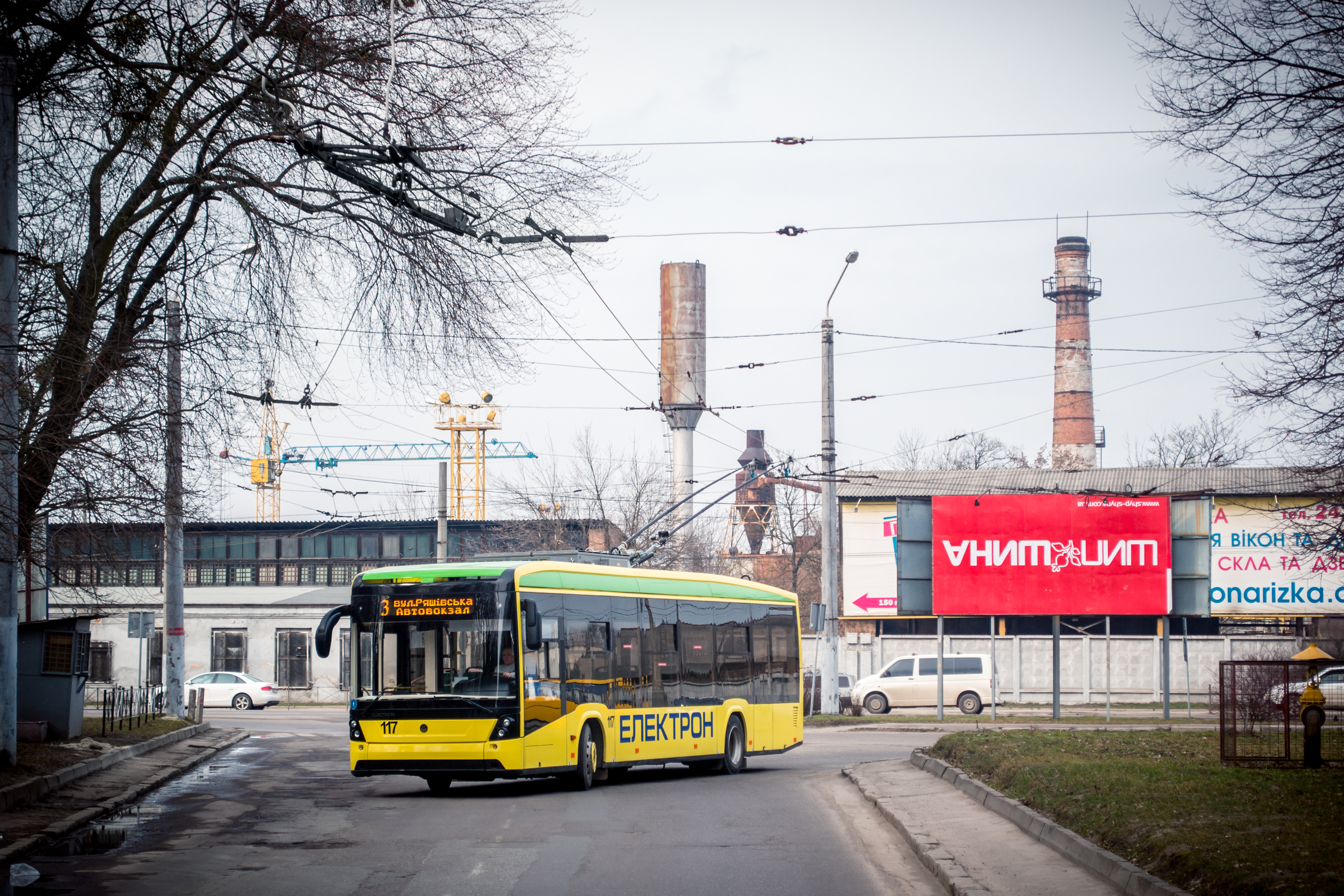
T19102

- Electron T19102 — 12-meter trolleybus with asynchronous engine AD-903U1 manufactured by Elektrotyazhmash (Kharkiv) and traction converter ENI-ZNT200/EL/LW of ENIKA (Poland), produced since 2015.

== Currently operating in ==
Country	City	Company operating	Model	Deployment years	Amount (units)	Unit numbers
Ukraine	Lviv	LKP Lvivelektrotrans	Electron Т19101; Electron Т19102	2014—2019	2 58	114—173
Ukraine	Khmelnytskyi	Khmelnytske KP Elektrotrans	Electron Т19101	2014	2	011, 012
Total					62
