= Lviv City Council =

Lviv City Council Львівська міська рада

Type
- Type: Unicameral

Leadership
- Chairman (Mayor): Andriy Sadovyi, Self Reliance; 24 April 2024 - present
- Secretary: Markiyan Lopachak, Svoboda; October 2020 - present

Structure
- Seats: 64
- Political groups: European Solidarity (26); Self Reliance (17); VARTA Alliance (7); Voice (8); Svoboda (6)
- Length of term: 5 years

Elections
- Voting system: Proportional representation
- Last election: 25 October 2020
- Next election: 2025 (May be postponed due to martial law in Ukraine)

Meeting place
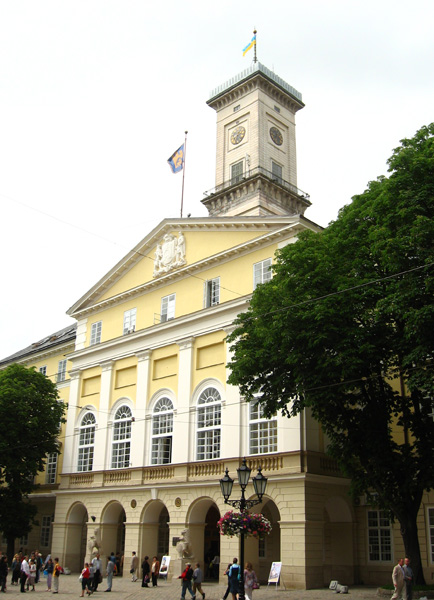
- 1 Market Square, Lviv (Lviv Town Hall); 49°50′31″N 24°01′54″E

Website
- city-adm.lviv.ua

The Lviv City Council (Ukrainian: Львівська міська рада, romanized: Lvivska miska rada) is the municipal council that governs the Ukrainian city of Lviv. The council has 64 seats and is elected every 5 years.

== History ==
On May 19, 2011, the Lviv City Council voted in favor of expanding the jurisdiction of the city council to the nearby area of Sokilnyky, about 28.8 hectares (71 acres), and Zymna Voda, about 57.32 hectares (141.6 acres).

Since 2007, the city council has been holding a Competition of Socio-Cultural Projects.

On May 27, 2020, in addition to the city of Lviv, 17 other nearby settlements were included to create the Lviv urban hromada. During the 2020 Ukrainian local elections on October 25, 2020, the first elections to the Lviv urban hromada were held.
